= Typecasting =

Association of an actor with a specific type of character

In film, television, and theatre, typecasting is the process by which a particular actor becomes strongly identified with a specific character, one or more particular roles, or characters having the same traits or coming from the same social or ethnic groups. There have been instances in which an actor has been so strongly identified with a role as to make it difficult for them to find work playing other characters.

== Character actors ==
Actors are sometimes so strongly identified with a role as to make it difficult for them to find work playing other characters. It is especially common among leading actors in popular television series and films.

=== Star Trek ===
One example of typecasting occurred with the cast of the original Star Trek series. Parade stated of the cast, "They are 'stars' only in the world of Star Trek ... [They] lost control of their destinies the minute they stepped on the bridge of the make-believe Enterprise in 1966", and The New York Times observed in 1991 that "For most of the actors in the original "Star Trek" series, Starfleet has never been far off the professional horizons".

During Star Trek's original run from 1966 to 1969, William Shatner was the highest-paid cast member at $5,000 per episode (equivalent to $50,000 in 2025), with Leonard Nimoy and the other actors being paid much less. The press predicted that Nimoy would be a star after the series ended, and James Doohan expected that appearing on an NBC series would help his post-Star Trek career. The series typecast the actors, however. As early as March 1970, Nichelle Nichols complained of Star Trek having "defined [her] so narrowly as an actress", and Doohan said that by 1971 producers were calling him "Scotty" when turning him down for roles, with even those he worked with before Star Trek telling his agent "I don't want a Scotsman". Only Shatner and Nimoy continued working steadily during the 1970s, and even their work received little attention unless it was Star Trek-related.

Walter Koenig in 1976 noted the disparity between the adulation from Trekkies at Star Trek conventions and his obscurity in Hollywood. Residuals from the series ended in 1971; Koenig, Doohan, and DeForest Kelley discussed the paradox of starring in what Kelley described as "the most popular series in the world" because of reruns, but "not getting paid for it". Cast members' income came mostly from personal appearances at conventions; by 1978 Kelley, for example, earned up to $50,000 (equivalent to $247,000 in 2025) annually. In 1979, the first of six films starring the cast appeared; Kelley earned $1 million for the final film, Star Trek VI: The Undiscovered Country (1991).

Being identified so closely with one role left the series' cast with mixed emotions; Shatner called it "awesome and irksome". Koenig called it "bittersweet ... People are interested in Chekov, not me", but admitted that there was "a certain immortality in being associated with Star Trek". After Doohan complained about being typecast, his dentist replied "Jimmy, you're going to be Scotty long after you're dead. If I were you, I'd go with the flow". Doohan said "I took his advice, and since then everything's been just lovely", noting that being part of a "classic" was "beautiful. Your great-grandchildren will still be seeing Star Trek".

Some of the Next Generation actors also became typecast. Patrick Stewart recalled that a "distinguished Hollywood director I wanted to work for said to me 'Why would I want Captain Picard in my movie?' That was painful". His most prominent non-Star Trek film or television role, Professor X in the X-Men film series, shares similarities to Jean-Luc Picard. Stewart stated "I don't have a film career. I have a franchise career"; he continues to work on stage as a Shakespearean actor. The Next Generation had one of the largest budgets of its time, and the cast became very wealthy. Jonathan Frakes stated that "it's better to be type-cast than not to be cast at all." Michael Dorn said in 1991, "If what happened to the first cast is called being typecast, then I want to be typecast. Of course, they didn't get the jobs after 'Trek.' But they are making their sixth movie. Name me someone else in television who has made six movies!"

=== Other examples ===
John Larroquette said that after winning four consecutive Emmy Awards, "it was 10 years after Night Court ended before I got a role as a dad. Because Dan Fielding was such a bizarre character, he had made such an impression, that typecasting does happen. Every role was some sleazy lawyer or some sleazy this or some sleazy that." During his years on the comedy Married... with Children, Ed O'Neill's scenes were cut from the film drama Flight of the Intruder (1991) after a test audience laughed when he was on the screen.

Jon Hamm stated that after the success of Mad Men, he received "about 40 scripts that were all set in the 60s, or had me playing advertising guys" like his character Don Draper.

Clayton Moore, who played the Lone Ranger in the Golden Age of Television, embraced his typecasting, stating that he had "fallen in love" with the character of Lone Ranger, and regularly appeared in public in character, to the point that Jack Wrather, who owned the character, issued a cease and desist order to Moore in 1979. The dispute was dropped in 1984 and Moore resumed his appearances. In a similar case, Alan Hale Jr. parlayed his fame as Skipper Jonas Grumby on Gilligan's Island into a seafood restaurant and a travel agency that offered three-hour boat tours.

Jonathan Frakes' sentiments about typecasting were echoed by Ben McKenzie, who became a star in the role of Ryan Atwood in The O.C. at age 24, after two years of seeking acting work in New York City and Los Angeles. Eleven years later, after starring in two more television series playing what The New York Times described as a "quiet, guarded leading man", McKenzie said that "if you are being stereotyped, that means you have something to stereotype. So they're casting you. That is an amazing thing. That is a gift. Worry about being pigeonholed in your 50s."

Daniel Radcliffe was cast as Harry Potter at age eleven, playing the character over ten years in an eight-film franchise. Afterwards, Radcliffe needed to handle the transitions out of being a child actor and to playing other roles. His career following the Harry Potter franchise has included appearing on stage, as in Martin McDonagh's The Cripple of Inishmaan; in independent films such as Kill Your Darlings, in which he played Allen Ginsberg; and major studio films such as Victor Frankenstein, in which he played the hunchback Igor, and romantic comedies such as The F Word (released in some countries as What If?).

Gary Sandy noted that being typecast as handsome characters such as Andy Travis on WKRP in Cincinnati strictly limited the amount of roles he was offered and the control he had over his choice of scripts; he left television after his role on that show, spending the rest of his career on stage.

Peter Robbins largely left acting after aging out of his most famous role, the voice of Charlie Brown. He retained a strong affection for the role throughout his life, including having a tattoo of the character.

Marilyn Monroe was typecast as a sex symbol of the 1950s throughout her acting career. Notable for portraying comedic "blonde bombshell" sex symbol characters in films such as Niagara (1953) and How to Marry a Millionaire (1953), as well as in musical comedies such as Gentlemen Prefer Blondes (1953), Monroe stated in late 1954 that she was "tired of the same old sex roles", and portrayed an embittered, pessimistic character for her final acting role in the black comedy film The Misfits (1961).

=== Historical-real characters ===
Soviet actor Mikheil Gelovani depicted Joseph Stalin in 12 films made during the leader's lifetime, which reflected his cult of personality. Among them were The Great Dawn (1938), Lenin in 1918 (1939), The Vow (1946), The Fall of Berlin (1950) and The Unforgettable Year 1919 (1952). These films were either banned or had the scenes featuring Stalin removed after the 1956 Secret Speech. Following Stalin's death, Gelovani was denied new roles since he was so closely identified with Stalin. According to The Guinness Book of Movie Facts and Feats, Gelovani had probably portrayed the same historical figure more than any other actor. Die Zeit columnist Andreas Kilb wrote that he ended his life "a pitiful Kagemusha" of Stalin's image.

Vaughn Meader is another example, as he depicted President John F. Kennedy in the 1962 comedy record The First Family. Meader's career success came to an abrupt end after President Kennedy's assassination on November 22, 1963. Meader's TV and nightclub bookings were all canceled. His career never rebounded as he was too closely associated with President Kennedy and his attempts to criticize his typecasting also led to his indirect blacklisting.

== Playing against type ==
"Playing against type" is when an actor performs in a role or style different from the types of roles that they are known for.

- Christian Bale's role as Patrick Bateman in American Psycho (2000) was different from his earlier performances and he was warned against the film. Similarly, when he was offered the role of Batman in Christopher Nolan's Batman Begins (2005), he was warned that he would be forever known as only Batman and would have trouble getting roles. The Dark Knight trilogy turned out to be a blockbuster and Bale's performance was appreciated. Bale has since performed in a range of award-winning roles.
- Jackie Chan was originally known for playing heroic and physically comedic roles in action and adventure films across over three decades. He was cast against type for a serious role as a Chinese immigrant opposite Pierce Brosnan as a corrupted Irish politician in the 2017 thriller The Foreigner, for which Chan garnered critical acclaim.
- Sacha Baron Cohen was known for his creation and portrayal of the fictional satirical characters Ali G, Borat Sagdiyev, Brüno Gehard, and Admiral General Haffaz Aladeen, before portraying Israeli spy Eli Cohen in the Netflix miniseries The Spy (2019).
- Bryan Cranston had played the immature, childish character Hal on Malcolm in the Middle. When Vince Gilligan approached AMC about his plan to cast Cranston as the morally dubious Walter White in Breaking Bad, the network was opposed to his casting in light of his previous comedic work.
- Tom Cruise was typically known for playing heroes before director Michael Mann cast him as an amoral hitman in Collateral (2004).
- Tony Curtis was known as "Hollywood's most handsome matinee idol"; as such, he was cast against type when he played serial killer Albert DeSalvo in The Boston Strangler (1968).
- Matt Damon was at first best known for his dramatic performance skills, as showcased in Good Will Hunting (1997), before being cast against type as the action hero Jason Bourne in the Bourne films.
- Henry Fonda, best known for playing morally upright, everyman heroes, was cast by director Sergio Leone to play a sadistic villain in the Western Once Upon a Time in the West (1968). Film critic Roger Ebert argued that much of the principal cast in Once Upon a Time in the West were cast against type: "Fonda is the bad guy for once in his career; Charles Bronson is impressively inscrutable as the mysterious good guy; and Jason Robards is a tough guy, believe it or not."
- Ice-T, who achieved fame as a gangsta rap artist early in his career, garnered critical acclaim for his subsequent acting roles as police detectives in New Jack City (1991) and Law & Order: Special Victims Unit.
- Gordon Jump, often typecast as milquetoast characters such as Arthur Carlson on WKRP in Cincinnati, took on the role of a child molester in the very special episode "The Bicycle Man" on Diff'rent Strokes. Jump considered the role "one of my most painful but rewarding parts," and the casting against type was noted as a standout moment in Jump's career.
- Michael Keaton had previously starred primarily in successful feel-good comedies before director Tim Burton cast him as Bruce Wayne / Batman in the dark action-drama Batman (1989).
- Matthew McConaughey, who, after making several romantic comedies, sought other, more dramatic film roles. He appeared in a supporting role in The Wolf of Wall Street and starred in Interstellar and Dallas Buyers Club, receiving critical acclaim in all three films and winning the Academy Award for Best Actor for the latter. This change in the direction of his career has been dubbed the "McConaissance", and is considered a remarkable career turnaround.
- Glenn Milstead performed mostly as a woman under his drag queen persona, Divine, performing mostly in the works of John Waters. In 1985, he appeared in what would his be his only male role in Trouble in Mind, a role written for him but against his usual drag type. A second male role in Married... with Children was never filmed, as Milstead died after rehearsals but before taping.
- Pat Morita was known for his comedic roles in his early acting career, particularly as Arnold in the American TV sitcom Happy Days. The casting directors of The Karate Kid (1984) were initially opposed to casting Morita as Mr. Miyagi, a serious role, due to Morita's background in comedy.
- Leslie Nielsen had an established career as a dramatic actor since the 1950s before appearing in the successful comedy film Airplane! (1980), specifically due to the gravitas he brought to the satire. This prompted a career reinvention that saw Nielsen go on to helm the Police Squad! series and The Naked Gun trilogy. Reflecting on his against-type casting, Nielsen later stated that he always felt more comfortable as a deadpan comedic performer and embraced being typecast in that style the rest of his life.
- George Peppard was typecast in "tough-guy" film roles following his portrayal of a young playboy and megalomaniacal tycoon in the 1964 film The Carpetbaggers. His career as a traditional leading man had been fading at the time by 1983, when he accepted the lead role in the TV series The A-Team, as the wisecracking, cigar-smoking head of a team of wanted commandos. Peppard stated he had wanted to transition into character actor roles but had never been given the opportunity until The A-Team.
- Tyler Perry came to prominence for comedic roles but in the crime drama in Gone Girl (2014) played a lawyer who specializes in defending men accused of killing their wives.
- Bob Saget began his career as a particularly vulgar stand-up comic. In the late 1980s, he was cast against type on television as the squeaky-clean Danny Tanner on Full House, which led to him also hosting the family-friendly America's Funniest Home Videos. Despite his new reputation as "America's Dad" from these roles, Saget maintained his vulgar stand-up routine for the rest of his life and played the contrast between the two types for laughs, which is credited with keeping his appeal fresh among the young adults (millennials) who watched him as children.
- Adam Sandler is best known for his comedy roles, in which he typically plays an "aggressive man-child" and an "extreme character surrounded by regular people." Director Paul Thomas Anderson cast Sandler in a dramatic role in Punch-Drunk Love (2002), as a man facing psychosis who goes "from understated sorrow to rage and back again." He again returned to serious work in The Meyerowitz Stories (2017), with Peter Debruge of Variety writing of his role, "With no shtick to fall back on, Sandler is forced to act, and it's a glorious thing to watch." For his leading role in Uncut Gems (2019), Sandler received critical acclaim, with some commentators calling it the best of his career.
- Gailard Sartain was typecast as a "country bumpkin" comic actor based on his work in the Ernest P. Worrell series and on Hee Haw. He took on a villainous role based on real-life sheriff Lawrence Rainey in Mississippi Burning, a role that few actors were willing to take and one that Sartain reflected upon as a "turning point" in his career.
- While James Stewart was known for his "affable" everyman roles, such as a businessman and father in It's a Wonderful Life, in Alfred Hitchcock's Vertigo (1958), he was cast against type as a "troubling or unsettling" character whose "mind unravels" until he attains a "cold, chilling air of sexual paranoia and control."
- John Wayne, known for playing heroic cowboys and lawmen, played antihero Rooster Cogburn in True Grit (1969). Wayne was cast against type several times in his career, including as Genghis Khan in The Conqueror (1956).
- Betty White, known for playing the sexually liberated Sue Ann Nivens on The Mary Tyler Moore Show, and Rue McClanahan, who had been known for playing scatterbrained characters such as Vivian Harmon in Maude and Fran Crowley in Mama's Family, were cast in opposite types in The Golden Girls: White played the naïve Rose Nylund, and McClanahan played sultry Southern belle Blanche Devereaux. Bea Arthur, for whom the lead role of Dorothy Zbornak had been conceived, was initially reluctant to join the cast, thinking that the typecasting would prompt viewers to see White and McClanahan as simply continuing their previous roles, but the "flip-flop" casting of the two types, and the originality of the show's premise, convinced her to sign on to the project.
- Robin Williams, a successful comedian and situation comedy actor, was cast against type in Insomnia and One Hour Photo (both 2002), two films in which he depicted "spine-chilling psychosis" and insanity. He also played the role of a therapist in Good Will Hunting.
- Chris Evans' first real success as an actor came by playing a series of character he has called "jocky pricks": good-looking but mean-spirited men known for their smugness, in films including Fantastic Four (2005), Scott Pilgrim vs. the World (2010), and What's Your Number?. Evans has commented, "I got cast as a lot of assholes." His role in Captain America featured a very different morality to the character. After fulfilling a seven-picture contract with Marvel Studios to play the character, which ended with Avengers: Endgame (2019), Evans returned to playing villainous characters in films such as Knives Out (2019), The Gray Man (2022), and Pain Hustlers (2023).
- Jim Carrey, notable for starring in comedies such as Liar Liar (1997), Dumb and Dumber (1994), and Ace Ventura: Pet Detective (1994), played against type in Eternal Sunshine of the Spotless Mind (2004) where he plays a bookish introvert.
- Emma Watson, notable for playing Hermione Granger in Harry Potter series, went against type in The Bling Ring (2013), where she played Nicki Moore, a brash and a self-obsessed fame-seeker, for which she received critical acclaim.
- Jet Li, notable for mainly portraying heroic roles in martial arts and adventure movies, played as a terminally ill single father who struggles to look up for his autistic 21-year-old son and work to make ends meet in his first drama movie Ocean Heaven (2010).
- Heath Ledger was known for his lighthearted or romantic roles in films such as 10 Things I Hate About You (1999), A Knight's Tale (2001), and Brokeback Mountain (2005). When he was cast as the psychopathic criminal mastermind Joker in The Dark Knight (2008), it was met with a significant public backlash. However, after the movie released, Ledger's performance received widespread critical acclaim, to the point that it has been termed as one of the greatest performances ever. Ledger posthumously received the Academy Award for Best Supporting Actor in the 81st Academy Awards for his role as the Joker.
- At the start of his career, Brad Pitt was playing a "cowboy-hatted hunk" or a traditional leading man characters in movies like Thelma and Louise (1991), A River Runs Through It (1992), Legends of the Fall (1994) and Interview with the Vampire (1994). His portrayal of Jeffrey Goines, a mentally unstable, hyperactive patient in a psychiatric ward in 12 Monkeys (1995) proved to be a career-defining pivot, earning him his first Academy Award nomination for Best Supporting Actor and a Golden Globe win.
- The Rock aka Dwayne Johnson, is mostly known for playing muscular, invincible and larger than life heroes in movies, especially in jungle-themed adventure movies like Journey 2: The Mysterious Island (2012), Jumanji: Welcome to the Jungle (2017), Jungle Cruise (2021) etc. He was then cast against type in Benny Safdie’s directorial The Smashing Machine (2025), where he played the role of Mark Kerr, a character more vulnerable than any of his previous roles. He garnered widespread critical acclaim for his performance, termed as his career best till date.

== See also ==
- Child actor
- Brat Pack – 1980s
- Brit Pack – 1980s
- Frat Pack – 1990s and 2000s
- Rat Pack – 1950s and 1960s
- Stunt casting
