= Vladimir Kenigson =

Soviet and Russian film and stage actor (1907–1986)

- Владимир Кенигсон
- Born: 7 November 1907 [O.S. 25 October] Simferopol, Taurida Governorate, Russian Empire (present-day Ukraine)
- Died: 17 November 1986 (aged 79); Moscow, Russian SFSR, Soviet Union
- Occupation: Actor
- Years active: 1925–1986

Vladimir Vladimirovich Kenigson (Note: Russian: Владимир Владимирович Кенигсон, romanized: Vladimir Vladimirovich Kenigson; Ukrainian: Володимир Володимирович Кенігсон, romanized: Volodymyr Volodymyrovych Kenihson. It corresponds to the Swedish surname Königson) (7 November 1907 [O.S. 25 October] 1907 – 17 November 1986) was a Soviet and Russian film and stage actor. People's Artist of the USSR (1982).

== Biography and career ==
Vladimir Kenigson was born in the family of barrister Vladimir Petrovich Kenigson in Simferopol. He graduated from the school at Simferopol Drama Theatre in 1925 and was admitted to the theater group. Then he played at the theater in Kuybyshev, Dnipropetrovsk and other cities. He was noticed on the stage by Alexander Tairov and was invited into their group.

In the years 1940–1949 Kenigson worked in Kamerny Theatre under the direction of Alexander Tairov, where he became a partner Alisa Koonen - in the performances of "Madame Bovary" (Rodolphe) and "Guilty Without Guilt" (Neznamov). After the closure of the Kamerny Theatre in 1949, on the advice of Tairov, he joined the Maly Academic Theatre.

At the same time Vladimir Kenigson starred in the Mikheil Chiaureli's film The Fall of Berlin, where he played the role of the Nazi general Krebs. For this, Kenigson was awarded the Stalin Prize by Joseph Stalin himself, who was delighted with his performance. Therefore, from the very first steps on one of the oldest Russian scenes Kenigson took the leading position in the company.

From 1949–1986 Kenigson was a permanent member of the troupe at Maly Academic Theatre in Moscow. There his stage partners were such stars as Elena Gogoleva, Vera Pashennaya, Elina Bystritskaya, Boris Babochkin, Mikhail Zharov, Nikolay Annenkov, Viktor Pavlov, Yury Solomin and many other notable Soviet and Russian actors. He played over 60 roles on stage and 30 roles in film and on TV. In addition to roles in movies he worked on dubbing of foreign films and cartoons, actors who talk with his voice: Jean Gabin, Louis de Funès and Totò.

Vladimir Kenigson is buried at the Vagankovo Cemetery at the 58th site, next to his son-in-law Alexey Eybozhenko.

== Personal life ==
- Daughter — Natalia Kenigson.
- Son-in-law — actor Alexey Eybozhenko.
- Grandson — TV and radio presenter Alexey Eybozhenko Jr.

== Selected filmography ==
- The Fall of Berlin (1950) as General Hans Krebs
- The Unforgettable Year 1919 (1951) as Paul Dukes
- Certificate of Maturity (1954) as Pyotr Germanovich Strakhov, teacher
- Miles of Fire (1957) as Sergei Beklemishev
- Major Whirlwind (1967) as Traub
- Passenger from the "Equator" (1968) as Pavel Gabush
- Seventeen Moments of Spring (1973) as ex-minister Krause
- The Flight of Mr. McKinley (1975) as episode
- Moon Rainbow (1983) as Charles Rogan

== Selected foreign films ==
- Fanfan la Tulipe (1952) — Noël Roquevert as Fier-à-Bras
- The Snows of Kilimanjaro (1952) — Leo G. Carroll as Uncle Bill
- Les Misérables (1958) — Bernard Blier as Javert
- Le Bossu (1959) — François Chaumette as Philippe de Gonzague
- Inherit the Wind (1960) — Fredric March as Matthew Harrison Brady
- The Mysteries of Paris (1962) — Raymond Pellegrin as Baron de Lansignac
- The Black Tulip (1964) — Robert Manuel as Prince Alexandre de Grassillac de Morvan-Le-Breau
- Lemonade Joe (1964) — Miloš Kopecký as Horace Badman, alias "Hogofogo"
- Fantômas (1964) — Louis de Funès as Commissioner Juve
- The Saragossa Manuscript (1965) — Gustaw Holoubek as Don Pedro Velasquez
- The Sucker (1965) — Louis de Funès as Léopold Saroyan
- Fantômas se déchaîne (1965) — Louis de Funès as Commissioner Juve
- Old Surehand (1965) — Larry Pennell as General Jack O’Neil
- Strike First Freddy (1965) — Martin Hansen as Dr. Pax
- The Sons of Great Bear (1966) — Jiří Vršťala as Jim Fred Clark
- The Big Restaurant (1966) — Louis de Funès as Mr. Septime, boss of a big Parisian restaurant
- Fantômas contre Scotland Yard (1967) — Louis de Funès as Commissioner Juve
- Oscar (1967) — Louis de Funès as Bertrand Barnier
- Romeo and Juliet (1968) — Antonio Pierfederici as Lord Montague
- L'homme orchestre (1970) — Louis de Funès as Mr. Edouard, alias Evan Evans
- La Horse (1970) — Pierre Dux as investigating magistrate
- The Married Couple of the Year Two (1971) — Pierre Brasseur as Gosselin
- Tecumseh (1972) — Wolfgang Greese as Governor William Harrison
- The Tall Blond Man with One Black Shoe (1972) — Bernard Blier as Bernard Milan
- Oklahoma Crude (1973) — Jack Palance as Hellman
- Zorro (1975) — Stanley Baker as Colonel Huerta
- Three Days of the Condor (1975) — John Houseman as Wabash
- Concorde Affaire '79 (1979) — Joseph Cotten as Milland

== Selected cartoons ==
- Gena the Crocodile (1969) as Salesman
- Flying Phantom Ship (1969) as Mr. Kuroshio (Soviet dub)
- The Blue Bird (1970) as Rich man
- The Mystery of the Third Planet (1981) as Robot waiter, robot from planet Shelezyaka

== Awards ==
- Stalin Prize, 1st class (1950) – for his portrayal of General Hans Krebs in The Fall of Berlin
- Honored Artist of the RSFSR (1954)
- People's Artist of the RSFSR (1968)
- Order of the Red Banner of Labour (1974)
- People's Artist of the USSR (1982)
