= Op. 89 =

In music, Op. 89 stands for Opus number 89. Compositions that are assigned this number include:

- Beethoven – Polonaise, Op. 89
- Brahms – Gesang der Parzen
- Dvořák – Requiem
- Fauré – Piano Quintet No. 1
- Hummel – Piano Concerto No. 3
- Saint-Saëns – Africa
- Schubert – Winterreise
- Schumann – 6 Gesänge
- Shostakovich – The Unforgettable Year 1919
- Sibelius – Four Humoresques, concertante works for violin and orchestra (1917–1918)
