= Sofya Giatsintova =

Soviet and Russian film and theatre actress, theater director and pedagogue

- Софья Гиацинтова
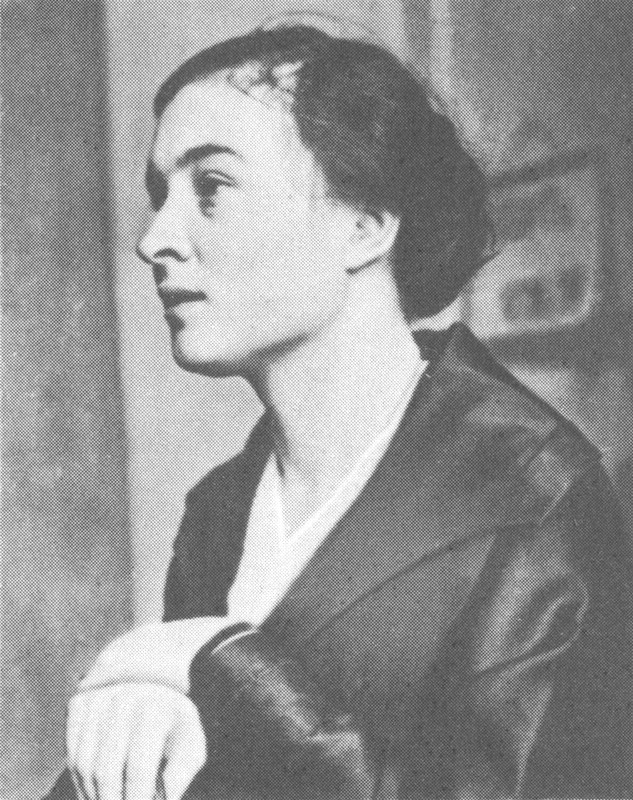
- Born: August 4, 1895; Moscow, Russian Empire
- Died: April 12, 1982 (aged 86); Moscow, Russian SFSR, Soviet Union
- Occupations: Actress; drama teacher; memoirist
- Years active: 1910–1980
- Awards: Stalin Prize (1947); People's Artist of the USSR (1955)

Sofya Vladimirovna Giatsintova (Note: Russian: Софья Владимировна Гиацинтова, romanized: Sofya Vladimirovna Giatsintova) (August 4, 1895 [O.S. July 23] – April 12, 1982) was a Soviet and Russian film and theatre actress, theater director and pedagogue, who worked in the Moscow Art Theatre (1910-1937), the Lenkom Theatre (1938-1957, 1961-1982, where she was the artistic director in 1951-1957), and the Moscow Stanislavsky Drama Theatre (1958-1960). Sofia Giatsintova, the People's Artist of the USSR (1955), received the Stalin Prize (1947, for her role of Varvara Mikhailovna in the film The Vow, 1946), as well as numerous state awards, among them the Order of Lenin (1965, 1975). She is the author of the book of memoirs Alone With Memories (С памятью наедине, 1985).

== Biography ==
Sofya Giatsintova was born in 1895 to a noble family from Moscow. Her father Vladimir Giatsintov was the Moscow State University professor; after 1914 he became the director of the Moscow University Fine Arts museum. Her mother Elizaveta Alexeyevna Giatsintova (née Vekstern) was connected to the renowned Chaadayev family. Sofia remembered her childhood as a happy one. The family adored theatre; Vladimir Giatsintov was a member of the Moscow Shakespearean Society and an amateur playwright. Even as a gymnasium student Sofia decided she'd be an actress and started to take lessons from Elena Muratova, the actress of the Moscow Art Theatre, and in summer 1910 joined its troupe.

In MAT Giatsintova became part of the active group of young actors, among them Yevgeny Vakhtangov, Mikhail Chekhov, Serafima Birman, which soon became known as the MAT's First Studio and later Second Moscow Art Theatre. Among her best known parts there were those of Maria in Shakespeare's Twelfth Night (1917, 1933), Sima (Crank, by Alexander Afinogenov, 1929), Nelly (Humiliated and Insulted by Fyodor Dostoevsky, 1932). In 1924 she married Ivan Bersenev, the theatre's actor and later artistic director. In 1936, as MAT 2 closed, Giatsintova (along with Bersenev and Birman) moved to the Lenkom Theatre which she became the head of in 1952.

In 1946 Giatsintova starred in Mikheil Chiaureli's The Vow as Varvara Petrovna, a woman who travels to Moscow on foot to give the beloved Vladimir Lenin the letter written by common people, only to find that the great revolutionary leader has just died. She finds herself on the Red Square and gives the letter to Joseph Stalin instead, right after he's proclaimed his allegiance to the Lenin's cause, speaking at the funeral. The film brought Giatsintova the Stalin Prize, but hasn't been seen much of after the Soviet dictator's death in 1953.

In 1955 Giatsintova was honored with the title People's Artist of the USSR. Her acclaimed book of memoirs Alone With Memories (С памятью наедине) came out in 1985. Sofia Giatsintova died on April 12, 1982, in Moscow. She is interred in Novodevichy Cemetery.

== Selected filmography ==
- The Vow (Клятва, 1946) as Varvara Mikhailovna Petrova
- The Fall of Berlin (Падение Берлина, 1949) as Antonina Ivanovna, Ivanov's mother
- Zhukovsky (Жуковский, 1950) as Anna Nikolayevna, Zhukovsky's mother
- Unfinished Story (Неоконченная повесть, 1955) as Anna Konstantinovna, Yershov's mother
- The Seventh Companion (Седьмой спутник, 1967) as Marya Semyonovna
