= Out of the Way! =

1931 Georgian film

- Directed by: Mikheil Chiaureli
- Written by: Sergei Tretyakov; Mikheil Chiaureli
- Starring: Sergey Zavriev; P. Chkoniya; Sh. Asatiani; Siko Vachnadze; Mikheil Gelovani; Valerian Gunia
- Cinematography: Anton Polikevich
- Production company: JSC "Sakhkinmretsvi"
- Release date: 1931
- Running time: 61 minutes
- Country: Soviet Union Georgian SSR
- Language: Silent (Georgian intertitles)

Out of the Way! (Georgian: ხაბარდა!, Russian: Здесь падают камни), also known as Khabarda, is a 1931 silent Georgian Soviet comedy film directed by Mikheil Chiaureli.Set in Tbilisi, the film tells a satirical, and at times absurdist, narrative about clashes between the Soviet Komsomol workers and the city's petit bourgeois. The film is extant.

== Plot ==
Local communist organizations in Tbilisi decide to renovate the city's crumbling old town to build new houses for workers. When they move to tear down a church on the city's outskirts, religious leaders and defenders of historical monuments attempt to mobilize against them.

== Cast ==
- Sergey Zavriev as Diomede
- P. Chkonia as Luarsabi
- Sh. Asatiani as Worker
- Siko Vachnadze as Technician
- Nikoloz Gotsiridze as Poet
- Mikheil Gelovani (uncredited)
- Valerian Gunia (uncredited)
- Viktor Gamkrelidze (uncredited)
- Zaal Terishvili (uncredited)
- Shalva Khuskivadze (uncredited)

== Production ==
The screenplay for Out of the Way! was written in collaboration with prominent Soviet constructivist writer Sergei Tretyakov, one of the founders of the LEF. Devised as a literary scenario in six parts, it is one of the writer's few screenplays, along with Salt for Svanetia and Eliso.

== Reception ==
The film was criticized on its release for perceived insensitivity to Georgian culture.

Georgian director Georgiy Daneliya stated that he particularly admired the film.
