= Yefim Dzigan =

Soviet film director (1898–1981)

- Ефим Дзиган
- Born: 14 December 1898; Moscow, Russian Empire
- Died: 31 December 1981 (aged 83); Moscow, Russian SFSR, Soviet Union
- Occupations: Film and theater director, actor, screenwriter
- Years active: 1924–1981

Yefim Lvovich Dzigan (Note: Russian: Ефим Львович Дзиган, romanized: Yefim Lvovich Dzigan) (14 December 1898 – 31 December 1981) was a Soviet film and theater director, actor and screenwriter. People's Artist of the USSR (1969).

== Filmography ==
=== Director ===
- First Cornet Streshnev (1928, co-directed with Mikheil Chiaureli)
- The Sailors of Kronstadt (1936)
- If War Comes Tomorrow (1938)
- Jambyl (1952)
- Torrents of Steel (1967)

== Awards and honours ==
- Two Orders of Lenin (1936 – for movie The Sailors of Kronstadt, 1978)
- Stalin Prize, 2nd class (1941) – for movies The Sailors of Kronstadt and If War Comes Tomorrow
- Honoured Worker of the Arts Industry of the RSFSR (1958)
- People's Artist of the RSFSR (1966)
- Two Orders of the Red Banner of Labour (1967, 1973)
- People's Artist of the USSR (1969)
- Order of the October Revolution
