= Martin Borulya =

1953 film by Aleksei Shvachko

- Directed by: Aleksei Shvachko; Gnat Yura
- Cinematography: Aleksei Gerasimov; Sergei Revenko
- Production company: Dovzhenko Film Studios
- Release date: 1953
- Running time: 95 minutes
- Country: Soviet Union
- Language: Ukrainian

Martin Borulya is a 1953 Soviet comedy drama film directed by Aleksei Shvachko and Gnat Yura and starring Yura, Varvara Chayka and Olga Kusenko. It was made in Ukrainian at the Dovzhenko Film Studios in Kyiv.

It is based on the eponymous play by Ivan Karpenko-Kary, staged by the Kyiv Drama Theater named after Ivan Franko.

== Plot ==
The protagonist, Martyn Borulya, a minor landowner, dreams of acquiring noble status. With the help of a rogue "ablat," he resorts to all possible means to achieve his goal: he acquires a forged document claiming noble ancestry, attempts to remodel his house in a noble style, secures a job for his son by fair means or foul, and plans to marry his daughter Marisya off to a "noble" registrar, Natsiyevsky. The efforts to obtain nobility lead to Borulya’s financial ruin and only bring him misfortune. The tragic intertwines with the comedic. Under pressure from his democratic friends and family members, who do not share his dream of becoming nobility, Borulya makes a conscious effort and burns the documents on which he had hoped to base his claim to noble rights. The family returns to a state of well-being.

== Cast ==
- Gnat Yura as Martyn Borulya
- Varvara Chayka as Palazhka
- Olga Kusenko as Marysya
- Sergey Olekseyenko as Stepan
- Maryan Krushelnitsky as Omelko
- Grigoriy Teslya as Gervasiy Gulyanitskiy
- Vasiliy Dashenko as Mikola
- Dmitri Milyutenko as Protasiy Penenozhka
- Nikolay Yakovchenko as Trandalyov
- Nikolay Svitenko as Dulskiy
- Semyon Likhogodenko as Trokhim
- Grigori Semyonovich Aleksandrov

== Bibliography ==
- Vi͡a͡cheslav Oleksandrovych Kudin. Soviet Ukrainian screen art. Mistetstvo Publishers, 1979.
