= Pyotr Pavlenko =

Soviet writer, screenwriter and war correspondent

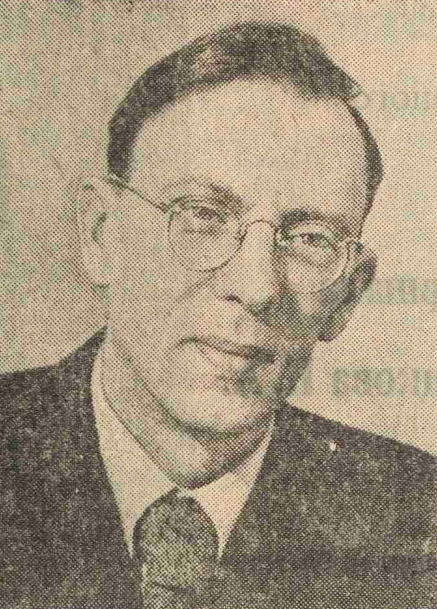
- Born: Pyotr Andreyevich Pavlenko; 11 July 1899; Saint Petersburg, Russian Empire
- Died: 16 June 1951 (aged 51); Moscow, Soviet Union
- Occupations: Novelist, writer, screenwriter, journalist, editor

Pyotr Andreyevich Pavlenko (Russian: Пётр Андре́евич Павле́нко; 11 July 1899 – 16 June 1951), was a Soviet writer, screenwriter and war correspondent. Recipient of four Stalin Prizes.

== Biography ==
=== Early life ===
Pavlenko was born in Saint Petersburg where his father was an office worker. Pavlenko studied at the Baku Polytechnic in 1919/20. In 1920 he began political work in the Red Army and continued this work later in Transcaucasia.

=== Career ===
He was part of the Soviet trade delegation in Turkey from 1924 to 1927. Pavlenko began publishing his works in 1928. His first short stories and essays, among them the collections Asian Stories (1929) and Istanbul and Turkey (1930), dealt with the non-Soviet East.

Pavlenko's travels in the Soviet East in the early 1930s furnished him with material for reevaluating and overcoming the heritage of oriental romanticism, a literary manner characteristic of the Pereval (The Pass) group of writers, with which he was associated. His new approach was reflected in the novella The Desert (1931) and the book of essays Journey to Turkmenistan (1932). In the novel The Barricades (1932), which dealt with the Paris Commune of 1871, he attained the realistic technique he'd been working toward.

=== Persecution of Osip Mandelstam ===
When the USSR Writers Union was formed in 1932, Pavlenko became a member of its board, and was expected to take part in policing other writers on behalf of the regime. He was summoned to NKVD headquarters in May 1934 to witness the interrogation of Osip Mandelstam, who had been arrested after a police informer had heard him recite the now famous Stalin Epigram. When Mandelstam collapsed and started having convulsions under the stress of his interrogation, Pavlenko taunted him: "Mandelstam, aren't you ashamed of yourself!". Afterwards, he spread a story around writers' circles that Mandelstam had been a ridiculous figure during his imprisonment. Mandelstam's widow, Nadezhda, who remembered Pavlenko as 'much cleverer and much more terrifying" than most writers she knew, remarked about his behaviour: "Public opinion has always been conditioned to take the side of the strong against the weak, but what Pavlenko did surpassed everything."

Pavlenko was called in by the NKVD again in May 1938, when Osip Mandelstam was arrested for the second time, to evaluate his life's work. His written assessment was that Mandelstam's verses - with the partial exception of his 'Ode to Stalin' - were "cold and dead" and "smelled" like the work of Boris Pasternak. The comparison with Pasternak was intended as an insult. In May 1937, Pavlenko had visited Pasternak at home to put pressure on him to sign a collective letter applauding the execution of Marshal Mikhail Tukhachevsky and other Red Army commanders, but Pasternak refused to co-operate. Posterity's opinion is that Mandelstam, like Pasternak, was one of the greatest poets of the twentieth century.

=== Working with Eisenstein ===
In 1937, when the renowned film director Sergei Eisenstein was under sustained attack by the head of the Soviet film industry, Boris Shumyatsky, Pavlenko boldly spoke up at a cinematographers' conference in Eisenstein's defence. Shumyatsky was dismissed and shot soon afterwards, and Eisenstein was permitted to resume film making, with Pavlenko as his screenwriter. The threat from Nazi Germany was increasing. Defence of the homeland was the central theme of Pavlenko's most recent novel, In the East (books 1–2, 1936–37; film title In the Far East, 1937, in collaboration with S. Radzinsky). His collaboration with Eisenstein produced what many critics regard as the finest film to come out of the USSR in the 1930s. This was Alexander Nevsky (1938), which described the defeat of the Teutonic knights by the princedom of Novgorod in 1242.

Pavlenko also collaborated with Eisenstein on a proposed sequence of three films about the Great Fergana Canal, but this project was never completed. Their partnership appears not to have ended on good terms. Pavlenko was not invited to work on Eisenstein's final project, a three part life of Ivan the Terrible, and he wrote a hostile review for Pravda of Ivan Grozny (known in English as Ivan the Terrible, Part One) around the time that it was first shown, in January 1945. The gallery proof of his review were ready, but it was not published, because Pravda's editors were warned that Stalin liked the film. Pavlenko also wrote the film script for Yakov Sverdlov (1940; in collaboration with B. M. Levin).

=== Later career ===
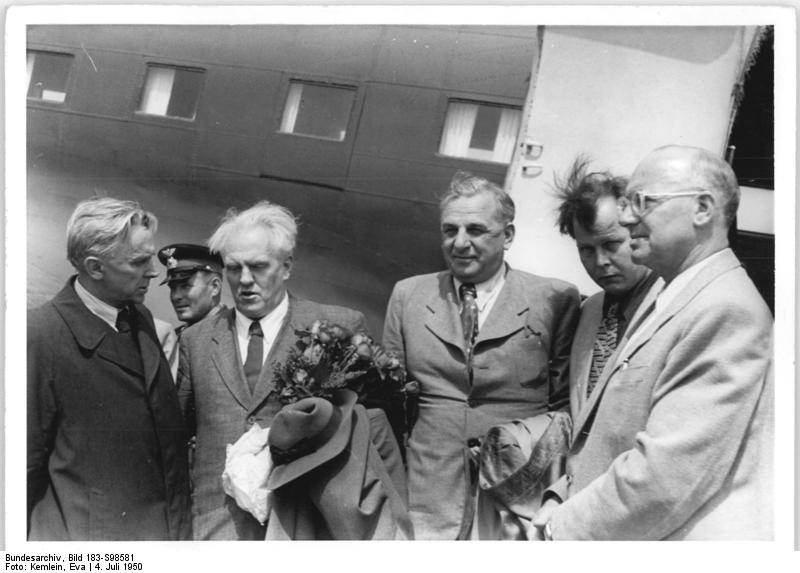
Konstantin Fedin, Nikolai Tikhonov, Pavlenko and Alexander Tvardovsky meeting with Johannes R. Becher in East Germany, 1950

Pavlenko was a war correspondent during the Soviet-Finnish War of 1939–40 and World War 2. The novel Happiness (1947) was inspired by his experience during the restoration of the Crimea's economy. The hero, the Communist Voropaev, is depicted comprehensively and in depth. In collaboration with Mikheil Chiaureli, Pavlenko wrote the scripts for the films The Vow (1946) and The Fall of Berlin (1949). He also wrote three books of essays, American Impressions (1949), Young Germany and Italian Impressions (both 1951). The novella Steppe Sunlight (1949) is clear and graphic in its language and well-defined in its aim. Pavlenko's novel Toilers of the World (partly published in 1952) was unfinished.

=== Later life ===
Pavlenko was a deputy to the third convocation of the Supreme Soviet of the Soviet Union. He died in 1951 in Moscow and was buried in the Novodevichy Cemetery.

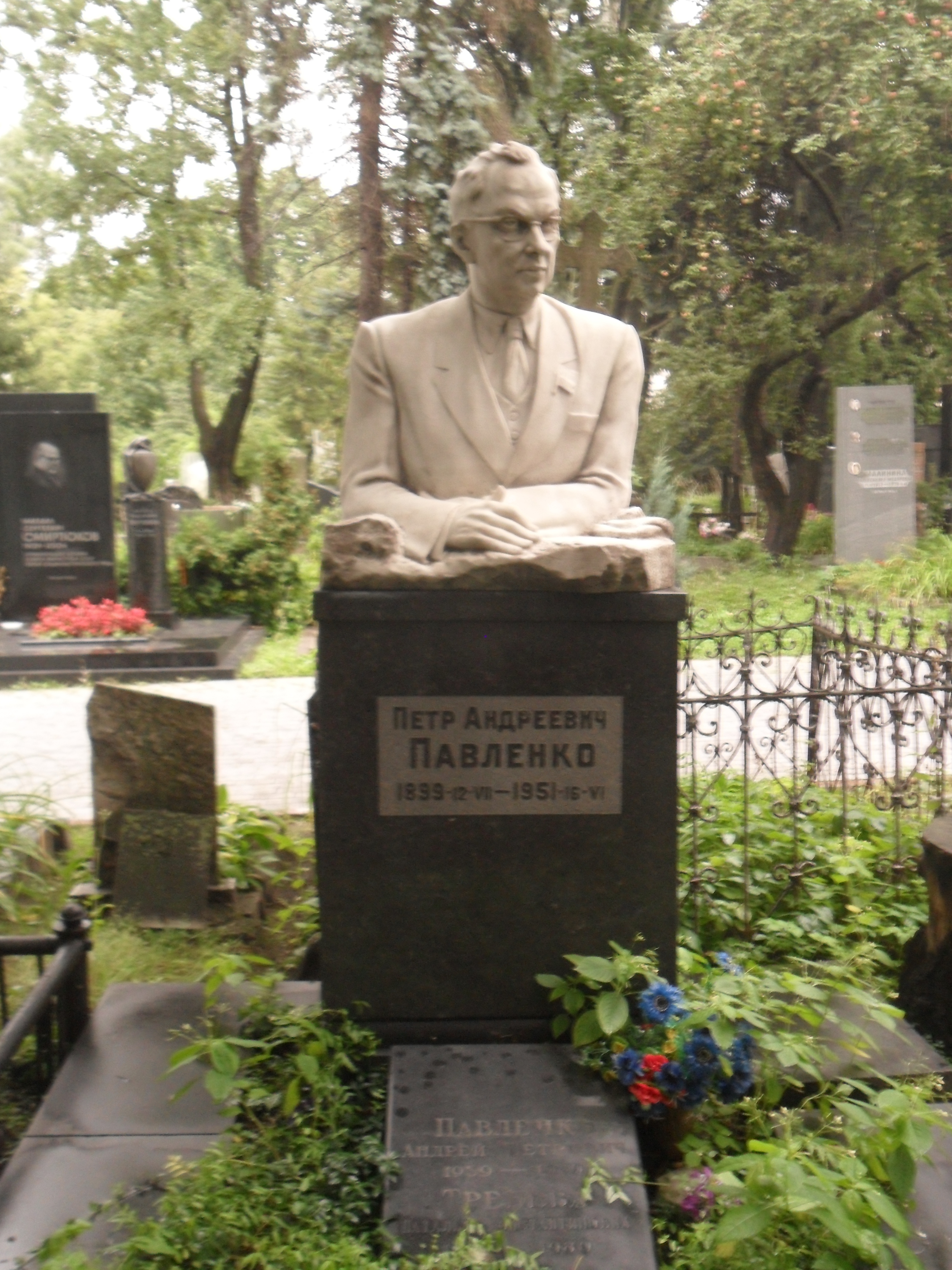
Grave of Pyotr Pavlenko at the Novodevichy Cemetery

== Awards ==
- 4 Stalin Prizes first degree:
  - 1941, for screenplay to the film Alexander Nevsky (1938)
  - 1947, for screenplay to the film The Vow (1946)
  - 1948, for the novel Happiness (1947)
  - 1950, for screenplay to the film The Fall of Berlin (1949)
- Order of Lenin (1939)
- Order of the Red Banner (1943)
- Order of the Red Star (1940)
- Medal "For the Defence of Moscow"
- Medal "For the Defence of Stalingrad"
- Medal "For the Defence of the Caucasus"
- Medal "For the Capture of Budapest"
- Medal "For the Capture of Vienna"

== Works ==
=== English translations ===
- Red Planes Fly East, Routledge & Sons, 1938.
- Happiness, Foreign Languages Publishing House, Moscow, 1950.
- Steppe Sunlight, Foreign Languages Publishing House, Moscow, 1953.
- The Voice on the Way: Novelettes, Foreign Languages Publishing House, Moscow, 1954.
- The Lost Son, from Such a Simple Thing and Other Soviet Stories, Foreign Languages Publishing House, Moscow. from Archive.org
- Happiness, the novel summarized from SovLit.net
