= Far from the Motherland =

1960 film by Aleksei Shvachko

- Poster
- Directed by: Aleksei Shvachko
- Written by: Yuri Dold-Mikhajlik
- Based on: I odin v pole voin by Yuri Dold-Mikhajlik
- Starring: Vadim Medvedev; Nina Veselovskaya; Vsevolod Aksyonov
- Cinematography: Mikhail Chorny
- Edited by: T. Lapoknish
- Music by: Ihor Shamo
- Production company: Dovzhenko Film Studios
- Release date: 9 May 1960
- Running time: 83 minutes
- Country: Soviet Union
- Language: Russian

Far from the Motherland (Russian: «Вдали от Родины», romanized: Vdali ot Rodiny) is a 1960 Soviet spy film directed by Aleksei Shvachko and written by Yuri Dold-Mikhajlik, based on his novel And One Warrior in the Field (Russian: И один в поле воин, romanized: I odin v pole voin; 1957).

== Plot ==
During the Second World War, a Soviet intelligence agent goes deep undercover in Nazi Germany to find the location of a secret underground plant that produces new types of weapons. The agent not only obtains the necessary information, but also help a famous designer escape from Nazi captivity.

== Release ==
Far from the Motherland was released in the Soviet Union on 9 May 1960 (Victory Day).

It was the highest-grossing film in the Soviet Union for 1960, with 42 million tickets sold.
