= Sofiko Chiaureli =

Georgian actress

- Chiaureli in 1987
- Born: 21 May 1937; Tbilisi, Georgian SSR, USSR
- Died: 2 March 2008 (aged 70); Tbilisi, Georgia
- Education: Theatre and Film university
- Occupation: Actress
- Years active: 1960–2008
- Spouses: Giorgi Shengelaia (divorced); Kote Makharadze (died 2002)
- Children: 2
- Parents: Mikheil Chiaureli (father); Veriko Anjaparidze (mother)
- Relatives: Georgiy Daneliya (cousin)

Sophia Chiaureli (Georgian: სოფიკო ჭიაურელი; 21 May 1937 – 2 March 2008), professionally known as Sofiko Chiaureli, was a Georgian and Soviet actress. Thought to be the muse of filmmaker Sergei Parajanov, she played a significant role in the 20th century Georgian theater and was associated with the country's two most prominent theaters, the Rustaveli Theatre (1964–1968) and Marjanishvili Theatre (1960–1964, 1968–2008).

== Biography ==
Chiaureli was born on 21 May 1937 in Tbilisi, Georgian SSR to Mikheil Chiaureli, an actor, film director and screenwriter, and Veriko Anjaparidze, an actress. The younger sister of the director Otar Chiaureli, Chiaureli was the maternal cousin of the director and screenwriter Georgiy Daneliya.

She graduated from the All-Russian Institute of Cinematography in Moscow and moved back to Tbilisi. In 1975 she was a member of the jury at the 9th Moscow International Film Festival.

== Personal life ==
Chiaureli was married to the film director Giorgi Shengelaia with whom she had two children, before later divorcing.

Chiaureli later married Kote Makharadze, an actor and sports commentator.

== Filmography ==
- Khevsurian Ballad (Хевсурская баллада, 1966) as Mzeqala
- Sayat Nova (Цвет граната, 1968) as young poet / poet's love / poet's muse / mime / angel / crazy nun
- Don't Grieve (Не горюй!, 1969) as Sofiko
- Natvris khe (Древо желания, 1976) as Pupala
- Einige Interviews zu persönlichen Fragen (რამდენიმე ინტერვიუ პირად საკითხებზე, 1979) as Sofiko
- Alibaba Aur 40 Chor (Приключения Али-Бабы и сорока разбойников, 1979) as Zamira, mother of Ali Baba
- A Piece of Sky (1980) as Turvanda
- Look for a Woman (Ищите женщину, 1983) as Alisa Postic
- Vacation of Petrov and Vasechkin, Usual and Incredible (Каникулы Петрова и Васечкина, обыкновенные и невероятные, 1984) as grandmother of Manana
- The Legend of Suram Fortress (Легенда о Сурамской крепости, 1985) as Old Vardo
- Million in the wedding basket (Миллион в брачной корзине, 1985) as Valeria
- Ashug-Karibi (Ашик-Кериб, 1988) as Mom
- Artists cuts („ხელოვანთა კადრებიდან“, 2005) film by Shota Kalandadze

== Honors ==
- People's Artist of the Georgian SSR (1976);
- People's Artist of the Armenian SSR (1979);
- Best Actress Award at The All-Union Film Festival (1966, 1972, 1974);
- Best Actress Award at the Locarno International Film Festival (1965);
- USSR State Prize (1980).
