= Mikheil Gelovani =

Georgian-Soviet actor and film director

- მიხეილ გელოვანი
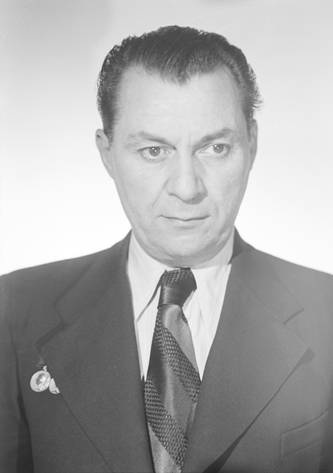
- Gelovani in 1947
- Born: 6 January 1893; Lechkhumi, Kutais Governorate, Russian Empire
- Died: 21 December 1956 (aged 63); Moscow, Russian SFSR, Soviet Union
- Resting place: Novodevichy Cemetery
- Occupations: Actor, director
- Years active: 1913–1956
- Spouses: Irina Eristavi (divorced); Lyudmila Gelovani (before 1956)
- Children: Georgy Gelovani

Mikheil Giorgis dze Gelovani (Note: Georgian: მიხეილ გიორგის ძე გელოვანი; Russian: Михаил Георгиевич Геловани, romanized: Mikhail Georgiyevich Gelovani) (6 January 1893 [O.S. 25 December 1892] – 21 December 1956) was a Soviet and Georgian actor, known for his numerous portrayals of Joseph Stalin in cinema, starring in fifteen historic movies mostly about the early Soviet era. He was recognized as People's Artist of the USSR in 1950 and won the four Stalin Prizes of the first degree (1941, 1942, 1947, 1950).

== Biography ==
=== Early life ===
Mikheil Gelovani was a descendant of the old Georgian princely house of Gelovani. He made his stage debut in a theater in Batumi during 1913. From 1919 to 1920, he attended the Drama Studio in Tiflis. In the two following years, he was a member of the cast in the city's Rustaveli Theatre. From 1923, he worked as an actor and a director in the Georgian SSR's Goskinprom film studio. In 1924, he first appeared on screen in the film Three Lives. He moved to the Armenian SSR's Armenkino production unit in 1927. In addition to his cinematic work, Gelovani continued to appear in theater, and performed on stages in Kutaisi and Baku. In 1936 he returned to the ensemble of the Rustaveli Theatre, and remained there for three years.

=== Antebellum ===
In 1938, Gelovani first portrayed Stalin in Mikheil Chiaureli's The Great Dawn. His performance won him the Order of the Red Banner of Labour on 1 February 1939 and the Stalin Prize during 1941. Afterwards, Gelovani "established a monopoly on the role of Stalin", which he continued to portray in twelve other pictures until the premier's death. Gelovani greatly resembled Stalin physically, except in his stature: he was much taller than the latter. Reportedly, he was not the premier's favorite candidate for depicting himself on screen: since he was Georgian, he mimicked Stalin's accent "to perfection". Therefore, the leader personally preferred Aleksei Dikiy, who used classic Russian pronunciation. However, Gelovani appeared in his role much more than Dikiy. According to The Guinness Book of Movie Facts and Feats, Gelovani had probably portrayed the same historical figure more than any other actor. When the two met, the general secretary told the actor: "you are observing me thoroughly... You do not waste time, do you?"

Soviet cinema played an important part in cultivating Stalin's cult of personality: from 1937 onward, in a gradual process, Stalin's reign was legitimized by depicting him as Vladimir Lenin's most devout follower and by positively presenting historical autocrats - like in Sergei Eisenstein's Ivan the Terrible.

=== Later years ===
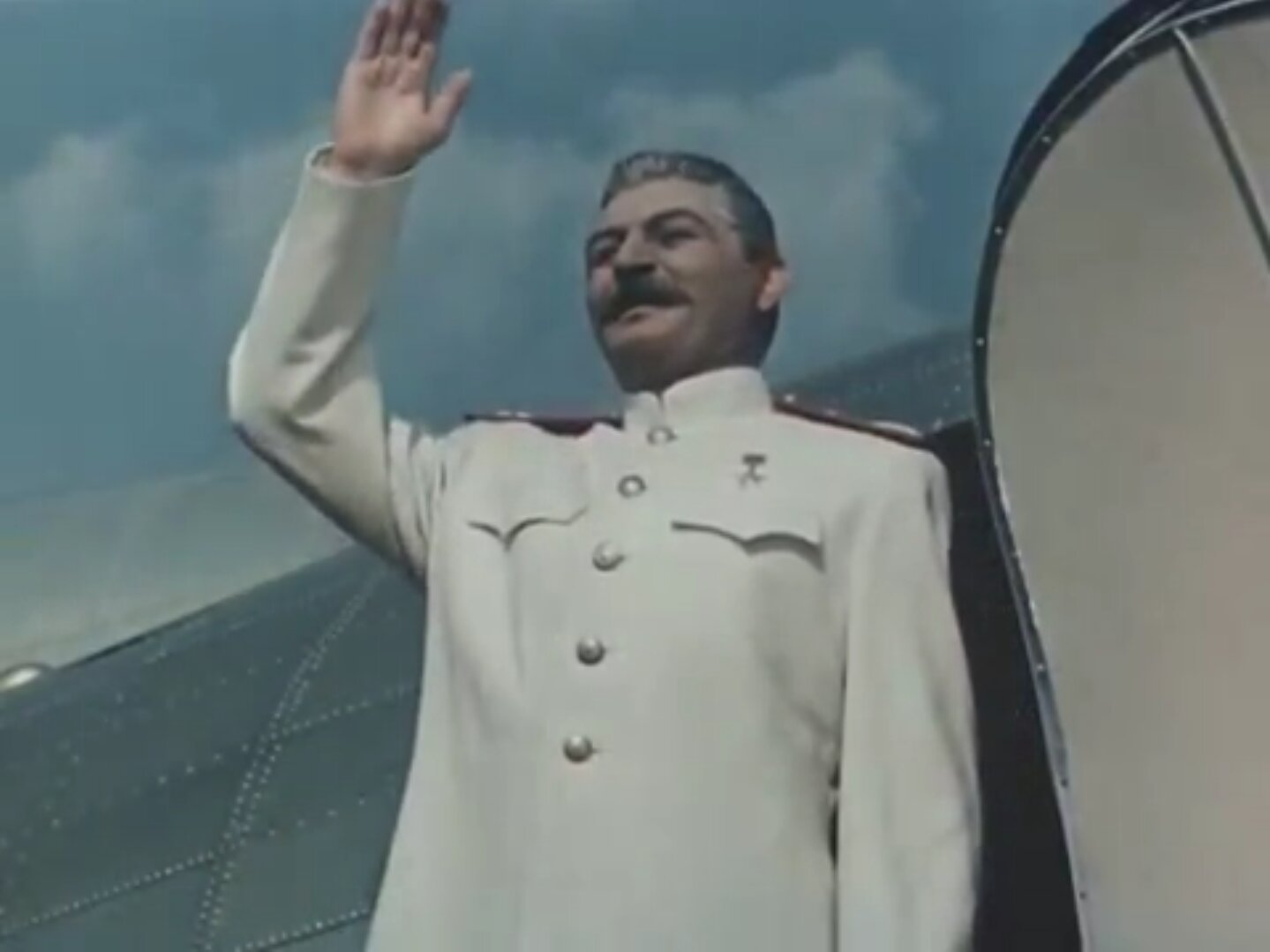
Gelovani as Stalin in The Fall of Berlin (1950)

Due to his identification with Stalin, Gelovani was barred from playing other roles in cinema; he was not allowed to depict "mere mortals". From 1942 to 1948, he was a member of the cast in the Gorky Moscow Art Theatre. During World War II, the personality cult was abandoned in favor of patriotic motifs, but returned already at the war's late stages, and with greater intensity than ever after 1945: Stalin was soon credited as the sole architect of victory. In the postwar films in which he portrayed him – The Vow, The Fall of Berlin and The Unforgettable Year 1919 – Gelovani presented the leader as "a living god".

The actor was awarded three more Stalin Prizes, all of which were granted for his performances of the premier in film: in 1942 for The Defence of Tsaritsyn, in 1947 for The Vow and in 1950 for The Fall of Berlin. On 3 June 1950, he was given the title People's Artist of the USSR.

After Stalin's death in 1953, Gelovani was denied new roles in films, since he was completely identified with the character of the late ruler. From 1953 until his death in 1956, he acted in Moscow's State Theater for Film Actors. Andreas Kilb wrote that he ended his life "a pitiful kagemusha" of Stalin.

Gelovani died on 21 December 1956 of Myocardial infarction in Moscow, and was buried in the Novodevichy Cemetery, alongside his wife Ludmila.

Following Nikita Khrushchev's Secret Speech in 1956, most of the pictures he appeared in as Stalin were either banned or had the relevant scenes removed.

== Filmography ==
As actor

Year	Film	Role	Notes
1924	Three Lives	Bakhva	
1925	Rider from the Wild West	N/A	
1926	The Ninth Wave	Avalov	
1927	Two Hunters	Turiko	
1927	Evil Spirit	Crazy Danel	
1931	Out of the Way!	N/A	
1934	Good-bye	Spiridon Lomidze	
1934	The Last Masquerade	Rostomi	
1937	The Return of Maxim	N/A	
1937	Orange Valley	Kirile	
1938	The Man with the Gun	Joseph Stalin	
1938	The Great Dawn	Joseph Stalin	
1939	Lenin in 1918	Joseph Stalin	Scenes deleted
1939	The Vyborg Side	Platon Vassilievich Dymba	
1940	Siberians	Joseph Stalin	
1941	Valery Chkalov	Joseph Stalin	Scenes deleted
1942	The Defense of Tsaritsyn	Joseph Stalin	
1946	The Vow	Joseph Stalin	Banned
1949	The Fall of Berlin	Joseph Stalin	Banned
1950	The Lights of Baku	Joseph Stalin	
1953	The Fires of Baku	Joseph Stalin	Scenes deleted
1952	The Miners of Donetsk	Joseph Stalin	
1952	The Unforgettable Year 1919	Joseph Stalin	Banned
1953	Jambyl Jabayev	Joseph Stalin	
1953	Hostile Whirlwinds	Joseph Stalin	Scenes deleted

As director

Year	Film
1927	Evil Spirit
1929	Youth Wins
1931	Deed of Valour
1931	True Caucasian

== Awards ==
- People's Artist of the Georgian SSR (1946)
- People's Artist of the USSR (1950)
- Stalin Prize 1st class (1941)
- Stalin Prize 1st class (1942)
- Stalin Prize 1st class (1947)
- Stalin Prize 1st class (1950)
- Order of the Red Banner of Labour (1 February 1939)

== Bibliography ==
- Beumers, Birgit (2009). A History of Russian Cinema. Berg Publishers. ISBN 978-1-84520-215-6.
- Boobbyer, Philip (2000). The Stalin Era. Springer Verlag. ISBN 978-0-415-18298-0.
- Dobrenko, Evgeni (2003). Stalinist Cinema and the Production of History: Museum of the Revolution. Edinburgh University Press. ISBN 978-0-7486-3445-3.
- Dumin, S.; Grebelsky, P. Kh; Lapin., V. V. (1994). Дворянские Роды Российской Империи: Князья Царства Грузинского. IPK Vesti. ISBN 978-5-86153-005-7.
- Heller, Klaus; Plamper, Jan (2004). Personality Cults in Stalinism. Vandenhoeck & Ruprecht. ISBN 978-3-89971-191-2.
- Montefiore, Simon Sebag (2004). Stalin - The Court of the Red Tsar. Phoenix London. ISBN 0-7538-1766-7.
- Prokhorov, Aleksandr, ed. (1982). "Gelovani, Mikhail Georgievich". Great Soviet Encyclopedia. Vol. 6 (3rd ed.). Collier Macmillan Publishers. ISBN 978-0-02-880110-0.
- Rappaport, Helen (1999). Joseph Stalin: A Biographical Companion. ABC-CLIO. ISBN 1-57607-084-0.
- Robertsons, Patrick (1991). The Guinness Book of Movie Facts & Feats. Abbeville Press. ISBN 978-0-85112-706-4.
- Taylor, Richard (1999). Film propaganda: Soviet Russia and Nazi Germany. I.B. Tauris. ISBN 978-1-86064-167-1.
- Taylor, Richard; Spring, Derek, eds. (1993). Stalinism and Soviet Cinema. Routledge. ISBN 978-0-415-07285-4.
- Torchinov, Valeri; Leontiuk, Alexei (2000). Вокруг Сталина. Историко-биографический справочник. Filologicheskii Fakultet Sankt-Peterburgskogo Universitet. ISBN 5-8465-0005-6.
- Youngblood, Denise J. (2007). Russian War Films: On the Cinema Front, 1914-2005. University Press of Kansas. ISBN 0-7006-1489-3.
- Yutkevich, Sergei; Afanaseev, Yuri, eds. (1987). Кино. Энциклопедический словарь. Soviet Encyclopedia. ISBN 5-900070-03-4.
- Zalesky, Konstantin (2000). Империя Сталина: Биографический энциклопедический словар. Veche. ISBN 5-7838-0716-8.
