= Hnat Yura =

Ukrainian actor (1888–1966)

Hnat Petrovych Yura
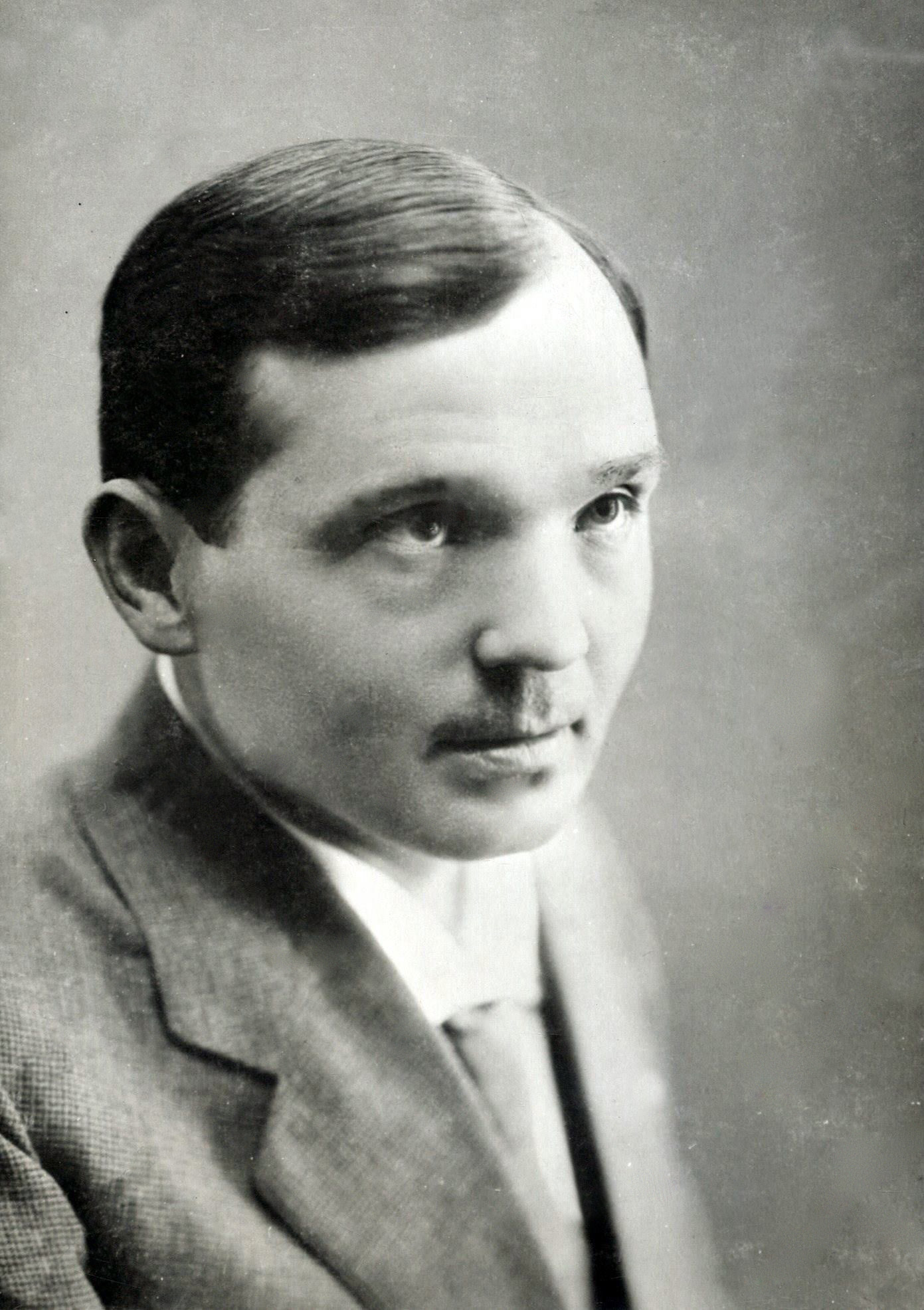
- Born: January 8, 1888; Fedvar, Kherson Governorate, Russian Empire
- Died: January 18, 1966 (aged 78); Kyiv, Ukrainian SSR, Soviet Union
- Occupations: Actor, Director
- Years active: 1936-1958 (film)

Signature
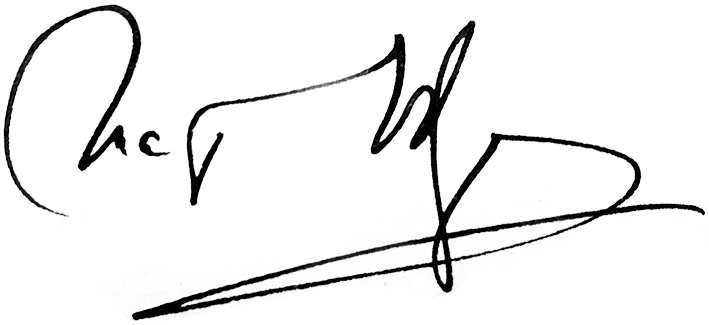

Hnat Petrovych Yura (Ukrainian: Гнат Петрович Юра, IPA: [ɦnɑt peˈtrɔwɪtʃ juˈrɑ]; also Gnat Yura; 8 January [O.S. 27 December] 1888 – January 18, 1966) was a Soviet and Ukrainian director, actor of theatre and film, pedagogue. He directed two films, and appeared on screen six times during the Soviet era. Yura received titles of professor (1946), People's Actor of Ukraine (1930), and People's Actor of the Soviet Union (1940).

== Biography ==
Yura was born in village Fedvar (today Pidlisne). His stage experience started in 1904 within an amateur club, while his professional performance started in 1907 as part of the Maksymovych troupe. Before the World War I he emigrated to Austria-Hungary where in 1913–1914 performed as an actor at the Ruska Besida Association theater in Lemberg (Lviv). Soon after the start of World War I, Yura was a member of the "Molodyi Teatr" theatre (Les Kurbas troupe) located in Kiev. In 1919 "Molodyi Teatr" was added to the newly reformed First Theater of the Ukrainian Soviet Socialist Republic based on the State Drama Theater of Ukraine. In 1920 a group of former "Molodyi Theatre" led by Yura joined "Novyi Lvivskyi Teatr", which in Vinnytsia was reformed into the Franko Ukrainian Drama Theatre, and for a few years (1920–1923) toured Ukraine.

== Selected filmography ==
- Prometheus (1936)
- Cossacks Beyond the Danube (1937)
- Shchors (1939)
- Taras Shevchenko (1951)
- The Unforgettable Year 1919 (1952)
- Martin Borulya (1953)

== Bibliography ==
- James Steffen. The Cinema of Sergei Parajanov. University of Wisconsin Pres, 2013.
