= Aleksei Shvachko =

Ukrainian film director

- Born: 18 January 1901; Chepilki, Russian Empire
- Died: 28 March 1988 (aged 87); Soviet Union
- Occupation: Director
- Years active: 1939-1972 (film)

Aleksei Shvachko (1901–1988) was a Ukrainian film director.

== Selected filmography ==
- Martin Borulya (1953)
- Far from the Motherland (1960)
- Nina (1972)

== Bibliography ==
- Joshua First. Ukrainian Cinema: Belonging and Identity During the Soviet Thaw. I.B.Tauris, 2014.
