= Veriko Anjaparidze =

Georgian actress

- ვერიკო ანჯაფარიძე
- Born: 6 October 1897; Kutaisi, Russian Empire
- Died: 30 January 1987 (aged 89); Tbilisi, Georgian SSR, Soviet Union
- Other name: Vera Anjaparidze
- Occupation: Actress
- Spouse: Mikheil Chiaureli

Veriko Ivlianes asuli Anjaparidze (Note: Georgian: ვერიკო ივლიანეს ასული ანჯაფარიძე, romanized: Verik’o Ivlianes asuli Anjaparidze; Russian: Верико Ивлиановна Анджапаридзе, romanized: Veriko Ivlianovna Andzhaparidze; Known by the diminutive Vera, Georgian: ვერა, romanized: Vera, Russian: Вера, romanized: Vera) (6 October [O.S. 23 September] 1897 – 30 January 1987) was a Soviet and Georgian stage and film actress.

== Life and career ==
Andjaparidze was born in Kutaisi and studied at the Aidarov Drama Studio in Moscow in 1916–1917 and at the Aleksandre Djabadari studio in Tbilisi in 1918–1921. Since 1920, Veriko Anjaparidze was an actress at the Shota Rustaveli State Theater in Tbilisi, and since 1927 she moved to the Marjanishvili Theatre, also in Tbilisi. Later, she became the art director of the theater. She was also teaching at the Rustaveli Theatre.

Andjaparidze’s film debut was in Vladimir Barskii’s Horrors of the Past (1925). She then played supporting parts in Yuri Zhelyabuzhsky’s Dina Dza-Dzu (1926) and Nikoloz Shengelaia’s Twenty-six Commissars (1932). In 1929, Andjaparidze starred in Mikheil Chiaureli’s morality tale about alcoholism Saba. She soon achieved a unique status as one of the leading female actresses of Georgian cinema, who was honored under all Soviet political leaders, from Iosif Stalin to Mikhail Gorbachev. She also starred as Rusudan in Chiaureli’s epic Georgi Zaakadze (1942–1946), the kolkhoz director Nino in Nikoloz Sanishvili’s comedy Happy Encounter (1949), and the lead in Siko Dolidze’s popular rural drama Encounter with the Past (1966). Tengiz Abuladze cast Andjaparidze in a minor yet essential role in his anti-totalitarian testament Repentance (1984).

== Recognition and honors ==
- People's Artist of the Georgian SSR (1943)
- Two Stalin Prizes first degree (1943, 1946)
- Stalin Prize second degree (1952)
- People's Artist of the USSR (1950)
- Hero of Socialist Labour (1979)

== Personal life ==
She was the wife of the film director Mikheil Chiaureli and the mother of the actress Sofiko Chiaureli. Anjaparidze died in Tbilisi and is buried in Mtatsminda Pantheon.

== Selected filmography ==
- Saba (1929) as Maro
- Giorgi Saakadze (1942) as Rusudan
- Keto and Kote (1948) as princess
- The Fall of Berlin (1950) as mother of killed German soldier Hans
- Don't Grieve (1968) as Kalantadze's mother
- The Legend of Suram Fortress (1985) as old fortune teller
- Repentance (1987) as wanderer
