= First Cornet Streshnev =

1928 film

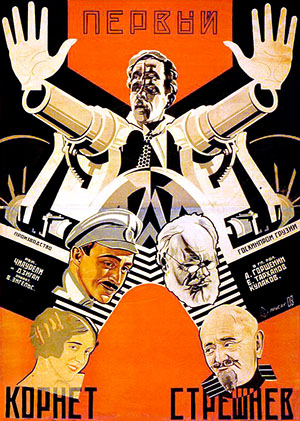
- Directed by: Mikheil Chiaureli; Efim Dzigan
- Written by: Arsen Aravski
- Cinematography: Viktor Engels
- Production company: Sakhkinmretsvi
- Release date: 2 October 1928
- Running time: 64 minutes
- Country: Soviet Union
- Languages: Silent; Georgian intertitles

First Cornet Streshnev (Georgian: Pirveli korneti Streshniovi) is a 1928 Soviet action adventure film directed by Mikheil Chiaureli and Efim Dzigan. It was made in the Georgian Soviet Socialist Republic.

== Plot ==
The events of the film take place during the First World War in 1917 on the Caucasian front. First cornet of the military orchestra Streshnev, not interested in politics faithfully serves his stern commander Colonel Garaburde. The musician learns that on the orders of Colonel a firing squad is prepared for a unit on which his son Streshnev Jr serves. The awakening of class consciousness of the old tsarist army campaigner forces him to join the rebel soldiers and warn his son and comrades of the impending danger.

== Cast ==
- Evstati Tarkhnishvili as Colonel Garaburda
- A. Gorshenin as Cornet Streshnev
- Andrey Martynov as Kratov
- M. Kulakov as Pavle
- N. Kharitonova as Nurse

== Bibliography ==
- Georges Sadoul & Peter Morris. Dictionary of Film Makers. University of California Press, 1972.
