= Giorgi Saakadze (film) =

- Directed by: Mikheil Chiaureli
- Starring: Akaki Khorava; Veriko Anjaparidze
- Production company: Tbilisi Film Studio
- Release date: 14 September 1942
- Running time: 3h 4min
- Country: Soviet Union
- Language: Russian

Giorgi Saakadze (Russian: Георгий Саакадзе, Georgian: გიორგი სააკაძე) is a 1942 Soviet historical drama film directed by Mikheil Chiaureli. The screenplay was written by Anna Antonovskaya and Boris Chenry on the basis of Antonovskaya's 1942 Stalin Prize-winning six-volume novel, Veliky Mouravi (The Great Mouravi). The film is a dramatization of the story of Giorgi Saakadze (portrayed by Akaki Khorava), a 17th-century Georgian political and military leader who was celebrated as a national hero of Georgia in Soviet wartime propaganda. Soviet leader Joseph Stalin was personally involved in modifying the movie's script.

The film emphasized that Saakadze, initially an obscure squire, was a victim of machinations at the hands of the wealthy feudal lords who would sacrifice everything, including their motherland, for their own benefit. It intentionally avoided any mention of Saakadze's own attempts to gain political power and illustrated him as a popular leader against the external aggressors. In the atmosphere of suspicion and spy mania in the Soviet Union during these years, the movie also served contemporary propaganda by emphasizing that treason against the popular leader, and hence the country, was to be punished cruelly.

== Plot ==
The film is set in the 17th century, when the Georgian state was fragmented into small principalities and was an object of desire for the Ottoman Empire, Persia and the Russian Empire. Georgia is invaded by the Ottomans. The illustrious warrior Giorgi Saakadze stands at the head of the people's army and, luring the Ottomans into a mountain gorge, wins at the battle of Suram.

Taking advantage of the current whereabouts of King Luarsab II, Saakadze starts building fortresses on the borders of the state. However, the marriage of the king to Tekle, sister of Giorgi, creates open anger among the Georgian princes. Henchmen of Shadiman, counselor of Laursab, treacherously attack Saakadze's castle and force him and his family to flee to Persia. Shah Abbas of Persian entrusts Saakadze with command of the Persian army. After a series of victorious campaigns, Giorgi Saakadze is proclaimed the greatest military commander.

By order of the Shah, the army under the command of Giorgi Saakadze invades Georgia. With the help of foreigners, Giorgi intends to pacify the unruly feudal lords and create a single Georgian state under the rule of Luarsab II. However, the hypocritical Shah deceives Giorgi. He announces the immunity of the princes who agreed to give him the king Luarsab. The Persian army destroys everything in its path and reduces Georgia to slavery. The king is sent to Persia. Giorgi Saakadze is blamed for this. Having met with the common people, Giorgi swears that he is the faithful son of Georgia. He calls on the people to go into battle against Persia. The Georgians emerge victorious from the battle with the Persians. The joy of victory is darkened by the news of Shah having murdered Giorgi's son, Paata. The enemies are driven out of Georgia, but fear of the collapse of the feudal foundations unites the princes. The demoralized Saakadze is defeated.

== Trivia ==
In this film, Director Mikheil Chiaureli gave a small role to his nephew Georgiy Daneliya, who would go on to become an influential Soviet and Russian film director. Daneliya played a peasant boy, but none of his scenes were included in the final film.

== Cast ==
- Akaki Khorava - Giorgi Saakadze
- Veriko Anjaparidze - Rusudan - His Wife
- Liana Asatiani - Tekle, his sister, later Queen of Georgia
- Spartak Bagashvili - Luarsab II - King of Georgia
- Georgiy Daneliya - peasant boy (uncredited)
- Medea Japaridze — Tinatin
