= The Unforgettable Year 1919 (Shostakovich) =

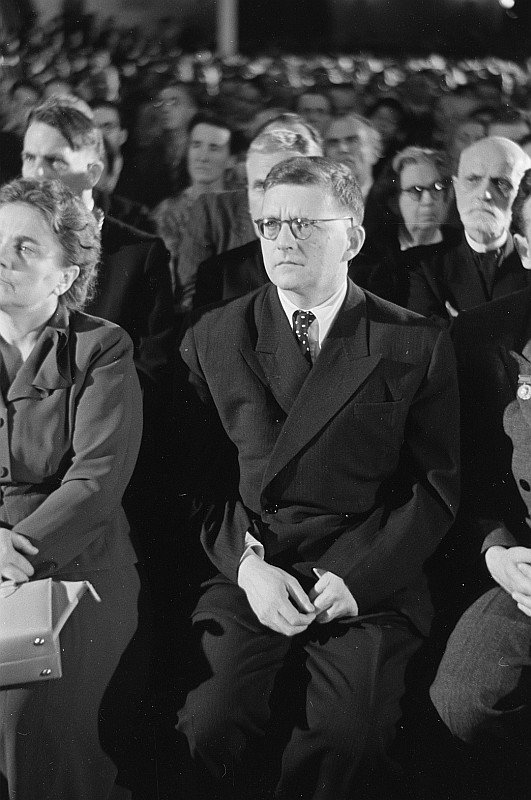
Dmitri Shostakovich in 1950

The Unforgettable Year 1919 (Russian: Незабываемый 1919 год, romanized: Nezabyvaemyy 1919 god), Op. 89a, is a suite of music adapted from the score written by Dmitri Shostakovich for the 1951 film of the same name directed by Mikheil Chiaureli. The suite was arranged from the film score by Lev Atovmyan (1901-1973) in 1954.

The suite has seven movements:

1. Introduction
2. Romance (Meeting of Shibayev with Katya)
3. Scene from the Sea Battle
4. Scherzo
5. The Assault on Krasnaya Gorka
6. Intermezzo
7. Finale

It is scored for full orchestra. The fifth movement has been described as "a mini-piano concerto, in the style of, but even more Hollywood-like than, Addinsell's Warsaw Concerto of 1941." This movement describes the attack on the Krasnaya Gorka fort outside St. Petersburg. Through mistranslation, the movement is sometimes known as The Attack on Beautiful Gorky. The music historian Marina Frolova-Walker comments that "it is indeed memorable music, although barely recognizable as Shostakovich and not even very appropriate to the on-screen action."

The film was made in praise of Joseph Stalin, who was portrayed (inaccurately) as having played a leading role in the events of the Russian Civil War around St. Petersburg in 1919. In February 1953 Shostakovich's score for the film was being considered for a Stalin Prize, but he sought to withdraw the nomination. In any event Stalin's death in March 1953 meant that the prize awards were cancelled. Shostakovich himself had a low estimate of the film: according to Solomon Volkov, he commented that Stalin "liked watching Unforgettable 1919, where he rides by on the footboard of an armoured train with a sabre in his hand. This fantastic picture, naturally, had nothing to do with reality".

The suite prepared by Atovmyan was first recorded by Melodiya in 1956 (omitting the fifth and sixth sections), with Alexander Gauk as conductor.
