= Torrents of Steel =

- Directed by: Efim Dzigan
- Written by: Efim Dzigan; Arkady Perventsev
- Starring: Nikolay Alekseev; Lev Fritschinsky; Vladimir Ivashov
- Cinematography: Aleksei Temerin
- Edited by: E. Karpova; A. Burmistrova
- Music by: Vano Muradeli
- Production company: Mosfilm
- Release date: 1967
- Running time: 108 minutes
- Country: Soviet Union
- Language: Russian

Torrents of Steel (Russian: Железный поток, romanized: Zhelezniy potok) is a 1967 Soviet war drama film directed by Efim Dzigan based on the eponymous story by Alexander Serafimovich.

== Plot ==
The plot is based on a heavy campaign by the Taman Army through the areas occupied by the White Army. The film is set during the summer of 1918, the beginning of the Russian Civil War.

== Cast ==
- Nikolay Alekseev - Kozhukh, commander of the Taman army
- Lev Fritschinsky - Artemov, regiment
- Vladimir Ivashov - Alexei Prikhodko
- Nikolay Dupak - Volosatov, regiment
- Nikolay Denisenko - The Barefooted
- Anatoly Degtyar - Opanasov
- Yakov Gladkikh - Smirnyuk
- G. Zaslawiec - Golovan
- Irina Murzaeva - Gorpina (voiced by Valentina Vladimirova)
- Nina Alisova - Claudia
- Leonid Gallis - General Anton Denikin
- Vladimir Sedov - General Viktor Pokrovsky
- Nikolay Zaseev-Rudenko - adjutant of General Pokrovsky
- Nikolay Trofimov - soldier Chirik
- Boris Bityukov - Red Commander
- Valentin Golubenko - Smolokurov
- Arkady Shcherbakov
- Akaki Kvantaliani - dukhan
- Ksenia Kozmina - Stepanida
- Valery Skorobogatov - Bratkin
- Sergey (Max) Maximov - soldier
- Yuri Volkov - Colonel
- Leon Kukulian
- Galina Samokhina
- Maria Saharchuk
- Mikhail Semenikhin
- Georgios Sovcis
