= The Unforgettable Year 1919 =

1951 film by Mikheil Chiaureli

- Directed by: Mikheil Chiaureli
- Written by: Vsevolod Vishnevsky (play)
- Screenplay by: Vsevolod Vishnevsky, Alexander Filmonov, Mikheil Chiaureli
- Produced by: Viktor Tsirgiladze
- Starring: Boris Andreyev
- Cinematography: Leonid Kosmatov, Vitaly Nikolaev
- Edited by: Tatiana Likhacheva
- Music by: Dmitri Shostakovich
- Production company: Mosfilm
- Release date: 1951
- Running time: 149 minutes
- Country: Soviet Union
- Language: Russian
- Budget: 10,936,000 Rbls

The Unforgettable Year 1919 (Russian: Незабываемый 1919 год, romanized: Nezabyvaemyy 1919 god) is a 1951 Soviet historical drama film directed by Mikheil Chiaureli.

== Plot ==
May 1919. The city of Petrograd, the Bolsheviks' stronghold in Russia, is attacked by the counter-revolutionary White Army of General Nikolai Yudenich, who is supported by the imperialist British, and especially by the warmongering Winston Churchill. The city's High Soviet is demoralized and about to order an evacuation, while the White fifth column inside it plots an insurrection. The Krasnaya Gorka fort dispatches a detachment of Baltic Fleet sailors to assist Petrograd, among them the young Vladimir Shibaev. As the Red Army faces defeat by the Whites, Joseph Stalin arrives on the battlefield, rallies the communists and routs the enemy, saving the city.

== Cast ==
- Boris Andreyev as Shibaev
- Mikheil Gelovani as Joseph Stalin
- Pavel Molchanov as Vladimir Lenin
- Gavriil Belov as Mikhail Kalinin
- Boris Olenin as Grigory Zinoviev
- Nikolai Komissarov as General Neklyudov
- Vladimir Kenigson as Paul Dukes
- Yevgeny Samoylov as Aleksandr Neklyudov
- Andrei Popov as Nikolai Neklyudov
- Muza Krepkogorskaya as Liza the housemaid
- Sergei Lukyanov as General Rodzyanko
- Pavel Massalsky as Colonel Vadbolsky
- Boris Dmokhovsky as Augustus Agar
- Ivan Solovyov as Walter Cowan
- Viktor Stanitsyn as Winston Churchill
- Hnat Yura as Georges Clemenceau
- Viktor Koltsov as Lloyd George
- L. Korsakov as Woodrow Wilson
- Vladimir Ratomsky as Potapov
- Gleb Romanov as commander of the armored vehicles
- Mikhail Yanshin as Colonel Butkevich
- Nikolai Garin as Aleksandr Rybaltovsky
- Anastasia Georgyevskaya as Darling
- Marina Kovalyova as Katya Danilova
- Angelina Stepanova as Olga Butkevich
- Yevgeny Morgunov as Anarchist
- Vsevolod Sanayev as Boris Savinkov (uncredited)
- Georgiy Daneliya as guitar player (uncredited)

== Production ==
The script was adapted from a play by the same name, that was composed by Vsevolod Vishnevsky for Stalin's 70th birthday in 1949 and won the Stalin Prize. Ronald Hingley wrote that Vishnevsky's play "magnified Stalin's Russian Civil War record beyond all recognition". Chiaureli's work was one of the only nine Soviet pictures produced during 1951. With a budget of nearly 11,000,000 roubles, it was also the most expensive film made in the Soviet Union up to that time. In addition, it was the last of Chiaureli's "super-productions about Stalin."

== Reception ==
The Unforgettable Year 1919 was heavily promoted by the Soviet press months before its release. It was watched by 31.6 million people in the USSR, becoming the country's fifth highest-grossing picture of 1952, coming behind four old American Tarzan movies from the 1930s.

The film won the Crystal Globe in the 1952 Karlovy Vary International Film Festival. Olga Romanova wrote that Stalin was not pleased by the portrayal of his youthful self by Mikheil Gelovani, and therefore did not award The Unforgettable Year 1919 a Stalin Prize; it was Chiaureli's only personality cult film to be denied the prize. In 1952, a Der Spiegel critic wrote that, in 1919, "Young Stalin stands in white-silk armor and arranges the defense of Leningrad... While the traitors receive their deserved bullet in the head". He added that it was only screened in East Germany.

In 1953, the picture was criticized by the Central Committee for "having significant shortcomings and lower ideological-artistic merits than those previously released by the director." In the summer of 1953, after Stalin's death, it was removed from circulation.

In February 1956, Premier Nikita Khrushchev delivered a speech condemning Stalin's cult of personality in front of the 20th Congress of the Communist Party of the Soviet Union. He told the audience: "Stalin loved to see the film The Unforgettable Year of 1919, in which he was shown on the steps of an armored train and where he was practically vanquishing the foe with his own saber. Let Kliment Voroshilov, our dear friend, find the necessary courage and write the truth about Stalin; after all, he knows how Stalin had fought." In March, the pro-Stalin protesters in the 1956 Georgian demonstrations included re-screenings of the film in their list of demands.

Peter Kenez noted that the film was the last made about the October Revolution and Civil War in the Stalinist period. Louis Menashe regarded 1919 as one of the post-war pictures in which "Stalin monopolized all heroism". William Luhr described it as "a highly elaborate and costly production... Another attempt at myth-making... In which Stalin is given the sole credit for crushing the anti-Bolshevik uprising." Ann Lloyd and David Robinson referred to the film as "the eminently forgettable The Unforgettable Year 1919."

Denise J. Youngblood commented that "as absurd" as Stalin's role was in Chiaureli's last film, The Fall of Berlin, it still contained "a grain of historical truth... Stalin was the USSR's leader during World War II." But in 1919, he was depicted in a completely ahistorical manner: "he was not the head of the party at 1919, nor was he a Civil War hero." John Riley added that during the relevant period in the Civil War, Stalin was stationed in Moscow, where he functioned as the People's Commissar for Nationalities.

Nikolas Hüllbusch, who researched Stalin's representations in cinema, wrote that the portrayal of premier's propagandistic "screen alter-ego" reached its "zenith" in The Fall of Berlin, and "this development marked its atrophic crisis." According to Hüllbusch, the officially sanctioned artistic line took a turn already in 1952, and the attempts to use Stalin's figure were frowned upon. Consequently, The Unforgettable Year 1919 and other Stalinist works from that year "had little notability... And were forgotten after the political reshuffle of 1953."

== Music ==
A suite drawn from the film score by Dmitri Shostakovich, (his Op. 89a), arranged by Lev Atomyan, was prepared in 1954 and recorded in 1956 by Melodiya with Alexander Gauk as conductor. The suite's fifth movement has been described as "a mini-piano concerto, in the style of, but even more Hollywood-like than, Addinsell's Warsaw Concerto of 1941.". It describes the attack on the Krasnaya Gorka fort. Through mistranslation the movement is sometimes referred to as "The Attack on Beautiful Gorky".
