= The Sailors of Kronstadt =

1936 Soviet drama film

- Russian poster
- Russian: Мы из Кронштадта
- Directed by: Efim Dzigan
- Written by: Vsevolod Vishnevskiy
- Starring: Vasiliy Zaychikov; Georgi Bushuyev; Nikolay Ivakin; Oleg Zhakov; Raisa Yesipova
- Cinematography: Naum Naumov-Strazh
- Release date: 20 March 1936
- Running time: 91 min.
- Country: Soviet Union
- Language: Russian

The Sailors of Kronstadt (Russian: Мы из Кронштадта) is a 1936 Soviet drama war film directed by Efim Dzigan.

The film tells about the confrontation of the sailors of the Baltic Fleet and the Yudenich formations, which besiege Petrograd.

== Plot ==
The film depicts events from October 1919 during the Russian Civil War, focusing on the defense of Petrograd against the advancing White Army forces led by General Yudenich.

As infantry units struggle to defend the city, an expeditionary detachment of sailors is organized in Kronstadt to provide reinforcements. A group of sailors from this detachment is captured and killed, with only one survivor, Artyom Balashov, managing to escape. Upon his return to Kronstadt, Balashov is tasked with leading a new landing force of sailors.

The film includes a satirical scene featuring a timid and fearful White Army soldier from Pskov, who nervously alternates between removing and reattaching his insignia while trembling and crossing himself, muttering, "We are Pskovites, we are Pskovites." This moment caricatures stereotypes about Pskov residents, though the negative traits attributed to them are unwarranted.

The film also highlights the psychological phenomenon of "tank fear" among infantry soldiers.

A common misconception is that the famous phrase "We are few, but we wear telnyashkas!"—later a well-known saying—originated in this film. However, this phrase does not actually appear in the movie.

== Cast ==
- Vasiliy Zaychikov as Commissar Vasili Martinov (as Vasili Zajchikov)
- Georgi Bushuyev as Artyom Balashov
- Nikolay Ivakin as A Red Army Soldier
- Oleg Zhakov as Regiment Commander Draudin
- Raisa Yesipova as Mademoiselle
- Pyotr Kirillov as Seaman Valentin Bezprozvanny
- E. Gunn as Seaman Anton Karabash
- Mikhail Gurinenko as Misha, the cabin boy (as Misha Gurinenko)
- Fyodor Seleznyov as A White Army Soldier (as F. Seleznyov)
- Pyotr Sobolevsky as A Lieutenant

== Reception ==
Writing for The Spectator in 1937, Graham Greene gave the film a good review, characterizing it as being "in the tradition of boys' stories, full of last charges and fights to the death, heroic sacrifices and narrow escapes, all superbly directed", and summarizing it as an "unusual mixture of poetry and heroics". Identifying moments of humour and pathos, Greene claimed that a Fordian poetic sense (i.e. not melodic arrangement, but moral composition) had thoroughly "impregnated" the film "from the first shot to the last", and that the writing resonated with Chekhov's definition of the novelist's purpose, "life as it is: life as it ought to be". Greene would return several months later to re-review the film for Night and Day where he again claimed that it was "the best film to be seen in London". Describing the film as somewhat propagandistic, Greene noted that "what makes the film immeasurably superior to its rivals is the strain of adult poetry, the sense of human beings longing for peace".
