= Yury Tymoshenko =

Soviet actor and comedian (1919–1986)

- Ю́рій Трохи́мович Тимоше́нко
- Born: 2 June 1919; Poltava, UNR
- Died: 1 December 1986 (aged 67); Uzhgorod, Ukrainian SSR
- Occupation: Actor
- Honours: People's Artist of the Ukrainian SSR (1960).

Yury Trochymovych Tymoshenko (Ukrainian: Ю́рій Трохи́мович Тимоше́нко; 2 June 1919, Poltava, UNR – 1 December 1986, Uzhgorod, Ukrainian SSR, USSR) was a Ukrainian Soviet actor, film director, screenwriter and spoken word artist. He was winner of the Stalin Prize (1950) and People's Artist of the Ukrainian SSR (1960).

== Biography ==
On stage since 1940, during the Soviet–German war Tymoshenko performed together with Efim Berezin as part of the song and dance ensemble of the South-Western Front. At first, they played the roles of cook Galkin (Berezin) and bath attendant Mochalkin (Tymoshenko).

After the war, from 1946 Tymoshenko worked at the Ukrainian Republican stage (from 1959 Ukrkoncert). In 1950, he received the Stalin Prize for the role of soldier Kostyantyn Zaichenko in the film "The Fall of Berlin". For some time Tymoshenko performed monologues under the nickname Bublyk, until Oleksandr Dovzhenko offered him the role of policeman Tarapunka. The name comes from the Tarapunka River in Poltava, where Tymoshenko spent his childhood. Berezin in his turn took the pseudonym Shtepsel (power plug), because at that time he played the role of an electrician. Their comical duet was popular for 40 years and also played in several movies.

Tymoshenko was married to actresses Olga Kusenko and Yulia Pashkovska. He was awarded four orders and medals.

Tymoshenko died of a heart attack while on tour in Uzhhorod. He was buried in Kyiv at Baikove Cemetery (plot No. 31).

== Literature ==
- Robert Vickers. Yuri Timoshenko and Efim Berezin. — M.: Art, 1982. — 224 p. — (Masters of the Soviet stage). — 25,000 copies
