= Akaki Khorava =

Georgian actor (1895-1972)

- აკაკი ალექსის ძე ხორავა
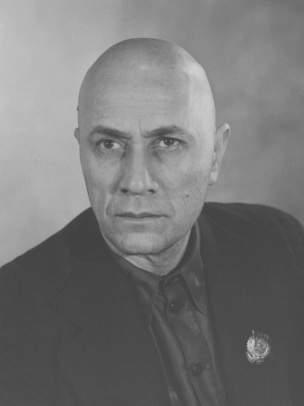
- Born: 29 April 1895 [O.S. 17 April] Ochkhomuri, Kutaisi Governorate, Russian Empire (present-day Georgia)
- Died: 23 June 1972 (aged 77); Tbilisi, Georgian SSR, Soviet Union
- Occupations: Actor; Theater director; Teacher
- Years active: 1919–1972

Akaki Aleksis dze Khorava (Note: Georgian: აკაკი ალექსის ძე ხორავა, romanized: Ak’ak’i Aleksis dze Khorava; Russian: Акакий Алексеевич Хорава, romanized: Akaky Alekseyevich Khorava) (29 April 1895 [O.S. 17 April] – 23 June 1972) was a Georgian and Soviet actor, theater director and pedagogue. He appeared in at least fifteen films from 1924 to 1965.

He is best known for his performances in The Great Warrior Skanderbeg and Giorgi Saakadze.

== Biography ==
Akaki Khorava was born on April 29, 1895 in village of Ochkhomuri, Kutaisi Governorate.

From 1915 to 1919 he studied at Kiev and Tbilisi Universities, and from 1922 at the theater studio of A.N. Pagava.

In 1924, he started working in films.

From 1923 he was actor and director of the Sh. Rustaveli Academic Theater (in 1936–1955 — artistic director and director of the theater).

From 1939 to 1949 he was Director of the Tbilisi Theater Institute named after Sh. Rustaveli.

He died on 23 June 1972.

== Awards ==
- People's Artist of the Georgian SSR (15 June 1934)
- People's Artist of the USSR (6 September 1936)
- Stalin Prize first class (1941) — for contributions in the field of performing arts
- Stalin Prize first class (1943) — for playing the main role in the first part of the two-part film Giorgi Saakadze
- Stalin Prize first class (1946) — for playing the main role in the second part of the two-part film Giorgi Saakadze
- Stalin Prize first class (1946) — for playing Ivan the Terrible in the play The Great Sovereign
- Stalin Prize third class (1951) — for the performance of the role of Jemal in the play "Sunken Stones" by Ilo Mosashvili
- Two Order of Lenin (30 April 1945 and 10 November 1950)
- Two Order of the Red Banner of Labour (22 March 1936 and 17 April 1958)
