= The Vow (1946 film) =

1946 film by Mikheil Chiaureli

- Directed by: Mikheil Chiaureli
- Written by: Pyotr Pavlenko
- Screenplay by: Pyotr Pavlenko, Mikheil Chiaureli
- Produced by: Viktor Tsirgiladze
- Starring: Mikheil Gelovani; Alexey Gribov
- Cinematography: Leonid Kosmatov
- Edited by: Lusia Vartikyan
- Music by: Andria Balanchivadze
- Production company: Tbilisi Film Studio
- Release date: 29 July 1946
- Running time: 108 minutes
- Country: Soviet Union
- Language: Russian

The Vow (Russian: Клятва, romanized: Klyatva) is a 1946 Soviet film directed by Mikheil Chiaureli. It is considered a representation of Joseph Stalin's cult of personality.

== Plot summary ==
In 1924, veteran Bolshevik Petrov, a resident of Tsaritsyn, begins carrying a letter to Vladimir Lenin, to inform him about Kulak brigands roaming the land and spreading death and misery. The Kulaks murder him. His widow, Varvara, continues his quest, joining a group that travels to Moscow. When they arrive, they discover that Lenin is dead. In the Kremlin, Vyacheslav Molotov tells Anastas Mikoyan that now, Grigory Zinoviev, Lev Kamenev and Nikolai Bukharin will attempt to subvert the party by attacking Stalin, Lenin's devout disciple. Stalin, mourning his teacher's passing, delivers a eulogy at the funeral, calling for all attendants and all the people of the Soviet Union to vow to maintain Lenin's legacy. The people swear. Varvara sees Stalin and hands him over the blood-stained letter, marked "To Lenin".

Varvara's son Sergei becomes an inventor, developing the first Soviet tractor with Stalin's encouragement. Her other son, Alexander, becomes manager of the Stalingrad Tractor Factory. Stalin leads the people of the USSR in implementing the Five-Year Plans and in industrializing their country, in spite of Bukharin's resistance. American saboteurs burn the tractor factory, killing Varvara's daughter, Olga.

As the Germans threaten war, Sergei travels to Paris to warn of the impending danger. The French and British reject Soviet warnings. As the Second World War begins, the two sons volunteer for the front. At the end of the war, Varvara and Stalin meet again in the Kremlin. Stalin kisses her hand, in recognition of Soviet mothers' contribution to victory, telling her that soon, everything that Lenin foresaw will be fulfilled.

== Cast ==
- Mikheil Gelovani - Joseph Stalin
- Alexey Gribov - Kliment Voroshilov
- Nikolai Konovalov - Mikhail Kalinin
- Roman Yuriev - Andrei Zhdanov
- Nikolai Ryzhov - Lazar Kaganovich
- G. Mushegian - Anastas Mikoyan
- Alexander Khvylya - Semyon Budyonny
- Fedor Blazevic - Georgy Zhukov
- George Belnikevich - Sergei Kirov
- A. Mansvtov - Unidentified Kremlin Official
- G. Mushegyan - Unidentified Kremlin Official
- Mikhail Sidorokin - Unidentified Kremlin Official
- A. Sobolyeva - Unidentified Party Official
- Unidentified Player - Adolf Hitler
- Unidentified Player - Feldmarschal Friedrich von Paulus
- Sofia Gyatsintova - Varvara M. Petrova
- Nikolay Bogolyubov - Alexander Petrov / Stepan Petrov
- Dmitry Pavlov - Sergey Petrov
- Svetlana Bogolyubov - Olga Petrova
- Nikolai Plotnikov - Ivan Yermilov
- Tamara Makarova - Xenia
- Vladimir Solovyov - Simon Ruzaev
- Sergei Blinnikov - Cormorant
- George Sagaradze - George
- Paul Ismatov - Yusuf Turgunbaev
- Vladimir Balashov - Anatoly Lipsky
- Ilya Nabatov - Georges Bonnet
- Nikolai Chaplygin - Johnson, British journalist
- Maxim Strauch - Rogers, American journalist
- Vladimir Maruta - Kaiser
- Vasili Merkuryev - General Nikolay Voronov

== Production ==
Director Mikheil Chaiureli began planning The Vow already in 1939, after the release of his previous picture, The Great Dawn - which, set before the October Revolution, was the first film to clearly portray Stalin as Lenin's indispensable aide and acolyte. The production of The Vow was delayed by the Second World War, during which the personality cult of Stalin was set aside in favour of patriotic motifs, to encourage the populace to resist the enemy. Even before the German surrender, as victory seemed secure, the cult gradually began its return to the screen; after 1945, it reached new heights, much more than before the war.

Playwright Iosef Prut, who was present when Chiaureli held a screening for Stalin, recounted that the Soviet premier disapproved of the ending scene, in which he was shown kissing Varvara's hand, telling the director he never kissed a woman's hand in his life. Chiaurely replied "the people know better what Stalin does and doesn't do." (Note: Stalin confirmed his declaration in another occasion. At 1947, during a Kremlin dinner, a drunken guest insulted Nina, Lavrentiy Beria's wife. Stalin, who saw her scolding, approached and kissed her hand, telling: "this is the first time in my life I kissed a woman's hand". See: Sergo Beria, Françoise Thom, Brian Pearce. Beria My Father: Inside Stalin's Kremlin. Duckworth Publishers (2003). ISBN 978-0-7156-3205-5. Page 142.)

== Reception ==
=== Contemporary response ===
The Vow was viewed by 20.8 million people in the Soviet Union. Chaiureli, Pavlenko, and actors Gelovani, Sofia Gyatsintova and Mikhail Plotnikov all won the Stalin Prize, 1st degree, during 1947.

At 1 July 1946, Pravda's critic wrote "In The Vow... It is demonstrated how all the actions of Comrade Stalin were consecrated, in unity with the will of the people... The artistic and ideological merit of the picture is in its portrayal of the love and confidence of the people toward Comrade Stalin."

The film was approved by French censors, in spite of police protests that it would threaten public order, although a scene negatively featuring Georges Bonnet was removed. News of the World's critic later dubbed it "the film they dare not show in Paris". In a 1949 article published in Les Lettres Françaises, Georges Sadoul called it "a film the qualities of which might offend the delicate, amateurish scholars and the admirers of Orson Welles... The Vow is the future of cinema, no less than Citizen Kane... The beautiful images from it are engraved in memory, monumental and sophisticated." At an article from 25 May 1950, he wrote that the film "opened the most glorious era in Soviet cinema." Film director Grigori Roshal described the film as "an epic legend, a sharp satire, a fiery pamphlet about enemies and a sincere story of simple Soviet people." André Bazin, who researched Stalinist cinema, regarded the film as a piece of propaganda, remarking that "the only difference between Stalin and Tarzan is that films about the latter do not pretend to be documentaries."

The New York Times’ reviewer Bosley Crowther noted that the film is "a tribute to Stalin... About as flowing and fulsome as could be... In short, The Vow is not subtle. It beats the drum and raises the flag for him... About as coyly as a May Day parade."

After Stalin's death in 1953, The Vow was removed from circulation. Subsequent to the 1956 Secret Speech, it was banned and placed in the archives. Nikita Khrushchev later admitted he greatly disliked the film, calling it and Chiaureli's works in general "a bootlicker's idea of art!" At 1971, Dušan Makavejev had used footage from a copy of The Vow he found in Yugoslav archives for the making of his film W.R.: Mysteries of the Organism.

=== Critical analysis ===
Richard Taylor noted that The Vow signaled a transformation in Stalin's cult of personality: rather than being seen merely as Lenin's successor, the premier was now also credited as a leader on his own right, by highlighting his role as the nation's savior during World War II. Unlike Chiaureli's next film, The Fall of Berlin, Lenin still had a considerable impact on the plot, but only in an inspirational manner - he was not seen alive, and the film deals with his burial. According to author Evgeni Dobrenko, Stalin's new status was hinted in another form: on the very month in which The Vow was released, Ivan the Terrible Part II was sharply condemned by critics. Historical films like Ivan and Peter the Great, that depicted great leaders of the past, served to reinforce the need for a strong ruler and legitimize Stalin's autocracy. With the prestige acquired by victory in World War II, he no longer needed this kind of support. Peter Kenez wrote that it was "the first film entirely devoted to Stalin himself."

Kenez also noted that the picture was the most exhaustive Stalinist interpretation of history seen on screen. J. Hoberman wrote that it "replaces history", by depicting all that transpired between Lenin's death and the victory in the war, in accordance with the official Soviet narrative: Stalin rises to power, promotes the Five-Year Plans, brings prosperity to the people, attempts to convince the treacherous capitalists to form an alliance against Nazi Germany and then leads the Soviet Union to victory against Hitler. No mention of the Ribbentrop-Molotov Pact is made in the film.

According to Edvard Radzinsky, Pavlenko intentionally combined Christian motifs in the plot, to induce an identification of Stalin with Jesus; Lenin played the part of John the Baptist in selecting him as Messiah. Bazin described the funeral scene as "a descent of Lenin's holy spirit unto Stalin, the new Moses."

Kenez viewed The Vow as "a turning point in Soviet cinema... It set the tone for many others to follow." Antonin and Miera Liehm commented that upon its release, "a style was born" of pictures "with Stalin always at their center... that fulfilled Andrei Zhdanov's requirements in their entirety... And so became the model for other filmmakers."

== Awards ==
- 1946 - Venice International Film Festival - special mention of the jury of international critics.
- 1947 - Stalin Prize I degree (to director Mikheil Chiaureli and actors Mikheil Gelovani, Sofia Gyatsintova, Nikolai Plotnikov).
