= Saba (1929 film) =

1929 film

- Directed by: Mikheil Chiaureli
- Written by: S. Alkhazishvili; Arsen Aravski; Grigori Arustanov
- Cinematography: Anton Polikevich
- Production company: Sakhkinmretsvi
- Release date: 10 September 1929
- Running time: 72 minutes
- Country: Soviet Union
- Languages: Silent; Russian; Georgian intertitles

Saba (Georgian: საბა)is a 1929 Soviet silent drama film directed by Mikheil Chiaureli. It was made in the Georgian Soviet Socialist Republic.

== Plot ==
Saba, a tram driver, begins drinking under the influence of his friends, leading to his dismissal from work. Under public pressure, his wife Maro leaves him and takes their son, Vakhtang, with her. In a severe hangover, Saba steals a tram from the depot and nearly becomes an unwitting murderer of his own son. The tram depot workers hold a mock trial for Saba, but it is the emotional shock that affects him even more.

In the film's finale, Saba quits drinking and returns to his job. As he walks down the street, a procession of young pioneers marches past him, carrying a mock coffin with a large bottle. Vakhtang carries a banner that reads: "Dad, don't drink wine."

== Cast ==
- Aleksandre Jaliashvili as Saba
- Veriko Anjaparidze as Maro, wife of Saba
- L. Januashvili as Vakhtangi, son of Saba and Maro
- Eka Chavchavadze as Olga

== Production ==
Chiaureli described the film as "a mixture of Mayakovsky with Dostoevsky": agitation in the film is combined with the gloomy tonality of the image, grotesque with psychologism.

== Bibliography ==
- Georges Sadoul & Peter Morris. Dictionary of Film Makers. University of California Press, 1972.
