= Kote Makharadze =

Actor

Kote (Constantine) Makharadze (Georgian: კოტე მახარაძე; 17 November 1926 – 19 December 2002) was a Soviet and Georgian actor and sports commentator.

Makharadze graduated from Tbilisi Choreography School in 1941 and the Shota Rustaveli State Theater Institute in 1948 and began working at the Rustaveli Theatre. He performed roles in various plays, including Hamlet, Bakhtrioni, Simghera Shevardenze, etc. In 1970, he joined the Marjanishvili Theatre, where he performed in Mosamartle, Kvachi Kvachantiradze, Schiller's Don Carlos and other productions. He earned the title of the Honored Artist of the Georgian SSR in 1958 and of the People Artist of the Georgian SSR in 1966.

Makharadze is best remembered for his career as a sports commentator whose passionate commentating fascinated audiences for decades. He began his sports career as a basketball player and led the junior national team of Georgian SSR to the USSR Championship in 1945. He became a sports commentator in 1957, covering soccer matches on Georgian television and radio. Two years later, he started commenting on central Soviet state television and radio and traveled abroad with the Soviet Union's national soccer team. He continued to work for the next four decades covering all major sports matches and Olympic games of this period, including Dinamo Tbilisi's historic wins of the USSR cup in 1964 and of the European Cup Winners' Cup in 1981.
