= Olga Kusenko =

Soviet and Ukrainian actress

- Ольга Кусенко
- Born: 11 November 1919; Kaniv, Ukrainian SSR, Soviet Union
- Died: 17 November 1997 (aged 78); Kyiv, Ukraine
- Education: Kyiv Theater Institute
- Occupation: Actress
- Honours: People's Artist of the Ukrainian SSR (1962). People's Artist of the USSR (1967).

Olga Yakivna Kusenko (Note: Ukrainian: Ольга Яківна Кусенко, romanized: Olha Yakivna Kusenko; Russian: Ольга Яковлевна Кусенко, romanized: Olga Yakovlevna Kusenko) (11 November 1919 – 17 November 1997) was a Ukrainian actress who became the People's Artist of the Ukrainian SSR (1962) and the People's Artist of the USSR (1967). She was Yuri Tymoshenko's first wife.

== Biography ==
She was born in 1919 in the city of Kaniv (now Cherkasy Oblast). From 1937 to 1941, she studied at the Kyiv Theater Institute under Georgy Polezhayev. Since 1942, she was an artist of the Stalingrad Front Theater, then of the Theater of the 4th Ukrainian Front. Conducted more than 450 concerts on the front lines. 3 1944 she worked at the Ivan Franko National Academic Drama Theater.

She was a deputy of the Supreme Soviet of the Ukrainian Soviet Socialist Republic of the 6th–8th convocations (1963–1975).

She died on November 17, 1997, in Kyiv. She was buried at the Baikove Cemetery.

== Honors ==
- Awarded the orders of the Order of the Red Banner of Labour, Order of the Badge of Honour, medals.
- Winner of the Stalin Prize (1951).
- Award named after Maria Zankovetska (1997, posthumous)
