= The Fall of Berlin (film) =

1950 Soviet war film directed by Mikheil Chiaureli

- 1950 poster
- Russian: Падение Берлина
- Directed by: Mikheil Chiaureli
- Screenplay by: Mikheil Chiaureli; Pyotr Pavlenko
- Produced by: Viktor Tsirgiladze
- Starring: Mikheil Gelovani; Boris Andreyev; Yury Tymoshenko; Marina Kovalyova; Vladimir Savelyev
- Cinematography: Leonid Kosmatov
- Edited by: Tatiana Likhacheva
- Music by: Dmitri Shostakovich
- Production company: Mosfilm
- Distributed by: Amkino (US)
- Release date: 21 January 1950 (USSR)
- Running time: 167 minutes (Original version); 151 minutes (Post-1953 version)
- Country: Soviet Union
- Language: Russian

The Fall of Berlin (Russian: Падение Берлина, romanized: Padeniye Berlina) is a 1950 Soviet two-part epic war and propaganda film. It was produced by Mosfilm Studio and directed by Mikheil Chiaureli, from a screenplay he co-wrote with Pyotr Pavlenko, and a musical score composed by Dmitri Shostakovich. Portraying the history of the Second World War with a focus on a highly positive depiction of the role Soviet leader Joseph Stalin (portrayed by Mikheil Gelovani) played in the events, it is considered one of the most important manifestations of Stalin's cult of personality, and a noted example of Soviet realism. After De-Stalinization, the film was banned in the Eastern Bloc for several decades.

== Plot ==
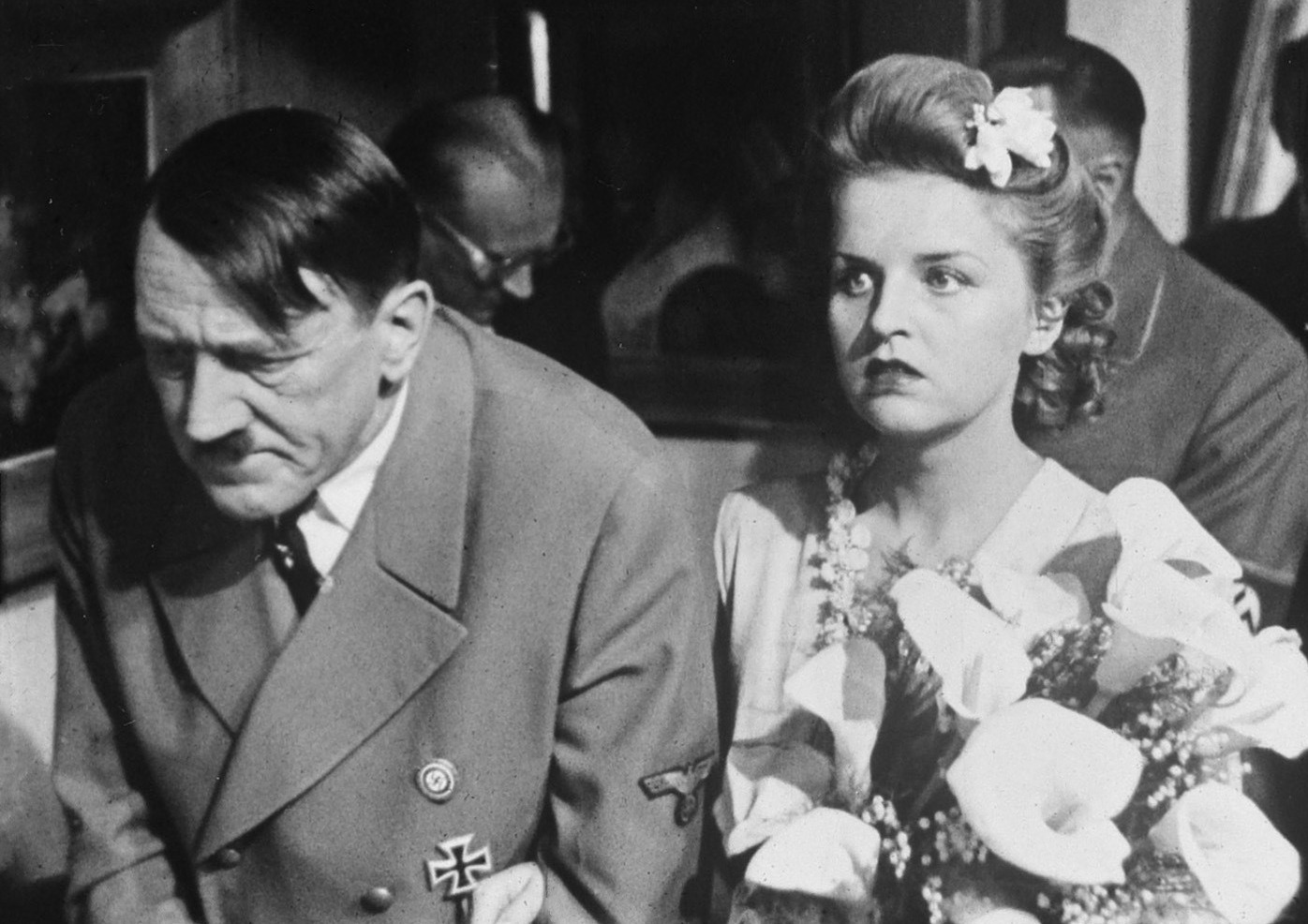
Vladimir Savelyev and Marie Nováková as Adolf Hitler and Eva Braun

=== Part 1 ===
Aleksei Ivanov, a shy steel worker, has fallen in love with Natasha, an idealistic teacher, but finds it difficult to approach her. However, he discovers that, because he has greatly surpassed his production quota, he will receive the Order of Lenin as well as a personal meeting with Joseph Stalin himself. At Stalin's estate in Moscow, Aleksei is summoned to see the leader as he enjoys and tends his garden. In the course of discussion, Stalin discovers Aleksei's problems with romance, helps him understand his emotions, and tells him to recite poetry to Natasha. After their talk, Stalin invites Aleksei to lunch with the rest of the Soviet leadership in Stalin's home. When he returns from Moscow, Aleksei confesses his love to Natasha. As they stroll happily together through a wheat field, their town is attacked by the Germans, who have just begun their invasion of the Soviet Union. Aleksei loses consciousness and sinks into a coma.

When Alexsei awakens, he finds out Natasha is missing and the Germans are at the gates of Moscow. In the capital, Stalin plans the city's defense, explaining to the demoralized Georgy Zhukov how to deploy his forces. Aleksei volunteers for the Red Army and takes part in the 1941 October Revolution Parade and the Battle of Moscow.

The film moves to Adolf Hitler's headquarters in Berlin. After receiving the blessings of his allies–Spain, Turkey, the Vatican, Romania and Japan–and watching a long column of Soviet slave-laborers (among them Natasha), Hitler is furious at the news that Moscow has not fallen. He dismisses Walther von Brauchitsch from his office and offers command of the army to Gerd von Rundstedt; the latter refuses, saying that Stalin is a great captain and Germany's defeat is certain. Hitler orders the attack of Stalingrad. In the meantime, Hermann Göring negotiates with (fictitious) British capitalist Charles Bedstone, who supplies Germany with needed materials.

After the Soviet victory in Stalingrad, Vasily Chuikov tells Aleksei that Stalin is always with the Red Army. The storyline leaps to the Yalta Conference, where Stalin and his Western Allies debate the war's future.

=== Part 2 ===
Stalin asks his generals who will take Berlin, the Soviet Union or the other Western Allies. His generals answer that the city will fall to Soviet forces. Among them is Aleksei, whose Guards unit advances towards Berlin while Hitler has a nervous breakdown and demands his soldiers fight to the end. The Germans want to execute the inmates of the concentration camp holding Natasha before the Red Army arrives, but Aleksei's unit liberates it in time to save them all. Nevertheless, Natasha faints from the many ordeals of being a slave laborer, fear of the fighting happening all around them, and suspicion of the increased activity of the camp overseers; Aleksei never realizes she is there.

Hitler and the German leadership fall into despair and lose their grip on reality the closer the Soviets get to Berlin. Hitler orders the military to flood the subway stations, drowning thousands of civilians. He then marries Eva Braun and kills himself by swallowing poison. General Hans Krebs carries the news of Hitler's death to the Red Army and begs for a ceasefire. Stalin demands an unconditional surrender.

Aleksei is chosen to carry the Victory Banner alongside Mikhail Yegorov and Meliton Kantaria. Their division storms the Reichstag, where the three soldiers hoist the banner atop of it. The Germans surrender, and Red Army soldiers from throughout the USSR celebrate.

Stalin arrives by plane to find an enthusiastic crowd of peoples of "all the nations" holding posters with his picture and waving dozens of nations' flags. He delivers a speech calling for world peace. Among the many listening intently are Aleksei and Natasha, though not together; they eventually recognize each other in the crowd and are finally reunited. A grateful Natasha asks Stalin if she can kiss him on the cheek, and they hug while freed prisoners praise Stalin in numerous languages. The film ends with Stalin wishing everyone peace and happiness.

== Cast ==
- Boris Andreyev as Aleksei Ivanov
- Mikheil Gelovani as Joseph Stalin
- Yury Tymoshenko as Kostya Zaichenko
- Marina Kovalyova as Natasha Rumyantseva
- Vladimir Savelyev as Adolf Hitler
- Vladimir Kenigson as General Hans Krebs
- Maksim Shtraukh as Vyacheslav Molotov
- Nikolay Mordvinov as Lavrentiy Beria (scenes removed in 1953)
- Alexey Gribov as Kliment Voroshilov
- Nikolai Ryzhov as Lazar Kaganovich
- Aleksandr Khanov as Nikolai Bulganin
- Gavriil Belov as Mikhail Kalinin
- Ruben Simonov as Anastas Mikoyan
- Fyodor Blazhevich as Marshal Georgy Zhukov
- Andrei Abrikosov as General Aleksei Antonov
- Konstantin Bartashevich as General Vasily Sokolovsky
- Sergei Blinnikov as Marshal Ivan Konev
- Boris Livanov as Marshal Konstantin Rokossovsky
- Vladimir Lyubimov as Marshal Aleksandr Vasilevsky
- Boris Tenin as General Vasily Chuikov
- Mikhail Sidorkin as General Sergei Shtemenko
- Oleg Frelikh as Franklin D. Roosevelt
- Viktor Stanitsyn as Winston Churchill
- A. Urasalyev as Yusupov
- Marie Nováková as Eva Braun
- Jan Werich as Hermann Göring
- Nikolai Petrunkin as Joseph Goebbels
- Vladimir Renin as Field Marshal Gerd von Rundstedt
- Nikolai Plotnikov as Field Marshal Walther von Brauchitsch
- Vladimir Pokrovsky as General Alfred Jodl
- Karel Roden Jr. as Charles Bedstone
- Miroslav Homola as Heinz Linge
- Dmitry Dubov as Mikhail Yegorov
- Georgy Tatishvili as Meliton Kantaria
- Veriko Anjaparidze as mother of killed German soldier Hans
- Nikolay Bogolyubov as Khmelnitsky
- Sofya Giatsintova as Antonina Ivanovna, Ivanov's mother
- Yevgeniya Melnikova as Lidiya Nikolayevna, secretary
- Dmitry Pavlov as Tomashevich
- Andrei Petrov as pilot
- Ivan Solovyov as Johnson
- Tamara Nosova as Katya
- Leonid Pirogov as James F. Byrnes

== Production ==
=== Background ===
Stalin's cult of personality, which began to manifest itself already in the late 1930s, was marginalized during World War II; to mobilize the population against the enemy, Soviet films focused on historical heroes who defended Russia or on the feats of the people themselves. The premier's character appeared in only two pictures during the war. However, as victory seemed secure, Stalin tightened his control over every aspect of the Soviet society, including cinema. After 1945, his cult returned to the screen with greater intensity than ever before, and he was credited as the sole architect of Germany's defeat. Denise J. Youngblood wrote that shortly afterwards, there remained only three kinds of war heroes: "the dead, the maimed and Stalin."

=== Inception ===
Mikheil Chiaureli, Stalin's favorite director, and writer Pyotr Pavlenko had already collaborated to create the 1946 personality cult picture The Vow. The Soviet Minister of Cinema, Ivan Bolshakov, instructed them both to begin work on The Fall of Berlin shortly after the release of The Vow in July 1946. The film was conceived as the Mosfilm studio's gift to Stalin for his official 70th birthday, (Note: Most historians believe that Stalin's date of birth was 18 December 1878, based on various documents. However, Stalin claimed to have been born on 21 December 1879. See the article Joseph Stalin for more information.) which was to be held on 21 December 1949. The Fall was supposed to be part of a cycle of ten films about the premier's role in World War II, entitled Stalin's Ten Blows, though not corresponding with the eponymous series of Eastern Front campaigns. The project was only partially fulfilled until Stalin's death.

=== Development ===
As with all films in which his character made an appearance, Stalin took a keen interest in the work on The Fall of Berlin. The dictator intervened in Pavlenko's writing, read the screenplay's manuscript and corrected several grammatical mistakes; he also deleted a short sequence during which a German civilian in Berlin exhorted his family to hasten and flee as the Red Army approaches. German historian Lars Karl believed this signaled his resolution to demonstrate that the civilian populace had nothing to fear from the Soviets. The picture was the first feature film about the Battle of Berlin and the events in Hitler's bunker, preceding Der letzte Akt by five years.

Edvard Radzinsky claimed his father heard from Pavlenko that Beria told him The Vow was to be a "sublime film", intended to identify Stalin with Jesus: Lenin, paralleling John the Baptist, recognized him as the Messiah; "this seminarist's language betrayed the authorship of this observation". Radzinsky added The Fall of Berlin "further developed the theme", as it ends "with an apotheosis: Stalin arrives by plane... In the white attire of an angel descending from the clouds", he "reveals himself to the expectant humans... They glorify the Messiah in all tongues." Russian historian Alexander Prokhorov believed the film was influenced by Nazi propaganda films. Author John Riley claimed the scene in which Stalin's plane arrives in Berlin – which was fictional; Stalin never flew to the German capital, let alone on the day of the capture of the Reichstag – was modeled after Hitler's landing in Nuremberg from the Triumph of the Will, and that the film's ending was inspired by a similar sequence from Kolberg; the storming of the Reichstag "parodied" the massacre on the Odessa Steps from Battleship Potemkin, a gesture intended to mock Sergei Eisenstein.

According to the memories of Svetlana Aliluyeva, Chiaureli approached her father with the idea to combine the fate of his son, Yakov Dzhugashvili, in the plot. Stalin promptly rejected this. Soviet actor Artyom Karapetian claimed Chiaureli's wife, actress Veriko Anjaparidze, told him Stalin was so outraged when he heard of this that Lavrentiy Beria – who was standing nearby – reached into his trousers' pocket, "presumably, for his gun." The director's daughter, Sofiko Chiaureli, recounted that her father "knew he was saved" when Stalin wiped tears from his eyes as he watched Gelovani descend from the plane and muttered "If only I had gone to Berlin."

=== Principal photography ===
Chiaureli brought some 10,000 Soviet extras to Berlin for the filming, and also hired many local residents for the tunnel flooding sequence; he was not able to work in the Reichstag as it was located in the British Zone of West Berlin and conducted the photography mainly in the Babelsberg Studios. However, most of the episodes set in the German capital were filmed in ruined cities in the Baltic region. In addition, a scale model of Berlin, over one square kilometer in size, was built in Mosfilm's studios; this miniature was to create the urban combat scenes in the end of Part II.

The Soviet Army provided five divisions, their supporting artillery formations, four tank battalions, 193 military aircraft and 45 captured German tanks to recreate the open field battles portrayed in The Fall of Berlin. They consumed 1.5 million liters of fuel during the filming.

The Fall of Berlin was one of the first colored films made in the Soviet Union. The producers used Agfacolor reels, taken from UFA's studios in Neubabelsberg.

=== Music ===
Composer Dmitri Shostakovich, who was accused of Formalism during 1948, was called on to compose the score. Vano Muradeli said that his contribution to The Fall of Berlin and other Stalinist films was the only thing which saved him from persecution by the establishment. Riley wrote that the film's score, along with Song of the Forests, "was the closest Shostakovich came to overt praise for Stalin." One additional piece of music used in The Fall of Berlin was Felix Mendelssohn's Wedding March, heard during the scene in which Hitler marries Eva Braun; the march was banned in Nazi Germany. According to Riley, it is unclear whether Chiaureli intended to mock the Nazis by portraying them as unable to recognize an item they have forbidden, or he has simply been ignorant of the ban.

Soundtrack for Part I

1. Main Title Part 1 (2:44)
2. Beautiful Day (2:14) [accompanied by a children's chorus singing Beautiful Day; lyrics by Yevgeny Dolmatovsky.]
3. Alyosha By the River (1:39)
4. Stalins's Garden (2:04)
5. Alyosha and Natalia in the Fields / Attack (3:55)
6. Hitler's Reception (1:31)
7. In the Devastated Village (2:39)
8. Forward! (0:58)

Soundtrack for Part II

1. Main Title Part 2 (2:06)
2. The Roll Call / Attack at Night (3:02)
3. Storming the Seelov Heights (6:26)
4. The Flooding of the Underground Station (1:11)
5. The Final Battle for the Reichstag / Kostya's Death (4:06)
6. Yussuf's Death / The Red Banner (3:41)
7. Stalin at Berlin Airport (4:28)
8. Finale / Stalin's Speech / Alyosha and Natasha Reunited (2:43) [7. and 8. accompanied by a chorus singing Glory to Stalin; lyrics by Yevgeny Dolmatovsky.]

== Reception ==
=== Contemporary response ===
The Fall of Berlin was released a month after Stalin's birthday, on 21 January 1950 – the twenty-sixth anniversary to the death of Vladimir Lenin. In the USSR, it was watched by 38.4 million viewers, becoming the third most popular Soviet movie of 1950. Director Mikheil Chiaureli, writer Pyotr Pavlenko, cinematographer Leonid Kosmatov, composer Dmitri Shostakovich and actors Mikheil Gelovani, Boris Andreyev and Vladimir Kenigson were all awarded the Stalin Prize, 1st Class for their work. In Czechoslovakia, the film also won the Crystal Globe in the 5th Karlovy Vary International Film Festival.

On the day of the film's release, Literaturnaya Gazeta published a column by Aleksandr Stein in which he described the film as "wonderful... a truthful portrayal of the relations between the people and the leader... and the love of all people to Stalin." A day after, Vsevolod Pudovkin wrote in Soviet Art: "this is an outstanding work of Soviet cinema" that presented "in profound depth and in vast scale... a bold, creative representation of the subject... a lively demonstration of the ever developing genre of Socialist Realism." The picture was enthusiastically promoted by the Soviet press. A series of articles in Pravda praised it as an authentic representation of history.

Public reaction to the film was monitored by the government: in a memorandum to Mikhail Suslov from 11 March 1950, two officials from the Bolshevik All-Union Communist Party's Propaganda Department reported that the newspaper Art and Life received numerous letters from viewers, who – although generally approving of the film – criticized various aspects of the plot; many of them cited Ivanov's boyish conduct as unworthy of a Stakhanovite. Lieutenant Colonel Yevgeni Chernonog, a war veteran, watched The Fall of Berlin while intoxicated. He commented: "And where did this angel come from? We have not seen him there". He was arrested and condemned to eight years in the Gulag.

The East German political establishment excessively promoted the picture, as well; it was officially classified as a documentary, and all servicemen of the Barracked People's Police were obliged to watch it. However, The Fall of Berlin was received with little enthusiasm by the populace. Years later, in an article he wrote for the Deutsche Filmkunst magazine on 30 October 1959, Sigfried Silbermann – director of the state film distributor Progress Film – attributed this response to the effect years of anti-Soviet propaganda had on the German people.

French critic Georges Sadoul wrote in Les Lettres Françaises: "In the USSR, films are no longer a merchandise... They have become a means to spread ideology, and are produced by engineers of the human soul... Some aesthetics today advocate American film noirs, but in the future only specialists will be interested in these museums of horror, the remains of a dead epoch... While the majority of people will applaud The Fall of Berlin." In France, it sold 815,116 tickets.

When the picture was imported to the UK by the Society for Cultural Relations with the USSR in 1952, the British Board of Film Censors considered banning it, especially as it was attacking Prime Minister Winston Churchill. Private screenings of the film were held both for the Members of Parliament in Westminster and for the Prime Minister in his Chartwell residence. Churchill wrote to historian Hugh Trevor-Roper in May, asking about the veracity of the Berlin underground flooding by Hitler, and the latter replied it was "mythologizing" history. After the Foreign Office concluded the picture was "too one-sided to serve as an effective communist propaganda", it was released without cuts, with a long disclaimer that stressed "the advantages of living in the free British society" and that the Soviet screenwriters completely ignored the Western Allies' role in the war. The film became the most successful Soviet or foreign picture about World War II screened in the UK during the 1940s and 1950s. Tony Shaw noted The Fall of Berlin enjoyed mostly positive reviews during its six-week run in London and its subsequent showings in the country, though some also commented it was overblown propaganda; the critics of The Sunday Times and the Evening Standard both opined that the Soviets' obliteration of the UK-US contribution to victory was akin to the same treatment received by the Red Army in Western productions about the war.

The film was one of the few foreign-language pictures to be presented in the BBC's program Current Release; former war correspondent Matthew Halton was invited to comment on it. The US magazine Variety described it as "The Russian answer to the many US and UK films about the war... having some contemporary significance, in the light of the tensions between the West and the Soviet Union." The New York Times' critic dubbed it as a "deafening blend of historical pageantry and wishful thinking... directed as if his (Chiaureli's) life depended upon it" and – in what author David Caute claimed was the worst condemnation which could be leveled at it in the day – that it had a "Hollywood-style plot". He also disapproved of the historical veracity of the Yalta Conference scene, while John Howard Lawson, recently released from prison, praised it as an authentic depiction of events. Officials in Artkino, the picture's US distributor, claimed the film was "already witnessed by 1.2 million people" in the United States by 9 June 1952, a day after its release there.

=== De-Stalinization ===
Stalin's death in March 1953 signaled a sharp turn in the politics of the Eastern Bloc. After Beria was arrested, Chiaureli was instructed by the new rulers to leave Moscow. The Fall of Berlin was withdrawn from circulation. A directive of the Soviet Film Export Bureau to halt its screening reached East Germany in July. During the summer of 1953, the scene featuring Aleksei Ivanov dining with Stalin and the other Soviet leaders in Moscow was edited out from all available copies; author Richard Taylor attributed this to the appearance Beria's character had there. In the post-1953 version, Ivanov is introduced to Stalin, and is then shown strolling with Natasha in the wheat field.

On 25 February 1956, Nikita Khrushchev delivered a speech condemning Stalin's cult of personality in front of the 20th Congress of the Communist Party of the Soviet Union. In the midst of it, he told the audience:

"Let us recall the film The Fall of Berlin. Here only Stalin acts. He issues orders in a hall in which there are many empty chairs. Only one man approaches him to report something to him – it is Poskrebyshev... And where is the military command? Where is the politburo? Where is the government? What are they doing, and with what are they engaged? There is nothing about them in the film. Stalin acts for everybody, he does not reckon with anyone. He asks no one for advice. Everything is shown to the people in this false light. Why? To surround Stalin with glory – contrary to the facts and contrary to historical truth."

Following the speech, the film was banned altogether, and all of its copies were placed in the archives. However, it continued to be screened in the People's Republic of China, the leadership of which opposed Khrushchev's criticism of Stalin. The pro-Stalinist protesters in the March 1956 Georgian demonstrations included a request to hold showings of the film in their list of demands.

=== Critical analysis ===
Historian Nikolas Hüllbusch viewed The Fall of Berlin as a representation of Stalin's strengthening political power. He compared it to the first fiction film to feature the premier, the 1939 Lenin in 1918, which depicted Stalin as Vladimir Lenin's most devout disciple; and to The Vow, in which he is chosen as Lenin's heir and takes an oath to keep his legacy. In The Fall of Berlin, Lenin has no impact on the plot. Instead of being the state founder's successor, Stalin's legitimacy was now based on his leadership of the USSR during the war.

Denise Youngblood wrote that although not the first to portray Stalin as "war hero in chief" – this was already done in pictures like The Battle of Stalingrad – The Fall of Berlin elevated him to a new status: "it deified Stalin." Richard Taylor pointed out the premier was the only decision maker in the plot, the only one responsible for the victory over Germany, and all other characters were either subservient or antagonistic. Stalin's stoic calm was stressed out by deliberately contrasting it to the hysterical rage of Hitler, or to the slow wit of Georgy Zhukov, who was portrayed in accordance with his political status in the late 1940s, after he was shunned by Stalin: Zhukov was not even among the generals who received Stalin in Berlin. Beside this, most characters – from Natasha to Gerd von Rundstedt – praise him as a great leader. Katerina Clark discerned that Stalin, beside his function as a great captain, was made the enabler of romantic relationship: before meeting him, Aleksei was incapable of expressing his love to Natasha. Slavoj Žižek commented the leader played the part of the "magician and the matchmaker who wisely leads the couple to reunion." Aleksei's character was not intended to be perceived as an individual, (Note: Alexei Ivanov served as the third man in the group carrying the Victory Banner, alongside two historical figures: Mikhail Yegorov and Meliton Kantaria. The other two were officially recognized and were awarded the title Hero of the Soviet Union. There was another person with the two in the Reichstag, though: Alexei Berest, a junior political officer. His part in the operation was silenced until years after Stalin's death.) but rather, a symbol to the entire Soviet people: he was depicted as an archetypal worker; his date of birth is given as 25 October 1917 by the Julian Calendar, the day of the October Revolution.

The film also made many references to the political situation in Europe. Turkey, which was a neutral country during the war but a rival of the Soviet Union in the Cold War, was portrayed as if it was an Axis state; the Turkish ambassador even greeted Hitler in the name of İsmet İnönü. The Nazi sympathies of Vatican ambassador Cesare Orsenigo were emphasized as well. Churchill, seen as an enemy after his 1946 Fulton Speech, was portrayed in a highly negative fashion.

It is regarded by many critics as the epitome of Stalin's cult of personality in cinema: Denise Youngblood wrote "it was impossible to go further" in the "veneration" of him; Philip Boobbyer claimed the cult reached "extraordinary proportions" with its release; Lars Karl opined it "stood above any other part of the cult"; Slavoj Žižek regarded it as the "supreme case of the Stalinist epic" Nikolas Hüllbusch commented that it was the "zenith" of the representation of Stalin's screen "alter-ego"; and Richard Taylor believed it was "the apotheosis of Stalin's cult of Stalin".

== Restoration ==
In 1991, after the dissolution of the Soviet Union, The Fall of Berlin had its first public screening in forty years, during the 48th Venice International Film Festival.

In 1993, Dušan Makavejev included footage from the film in his picture Gorilla Bathes at Noon.

In 2003, the film was remastered by a company from Toulouse, in a relatively poor quality. In 2007, it was re-released by the American group International Historical Films. No available version contains the Beria scene, though several old uncensored copies of the film appear to exist.
