= The Great Dawn =

1938 film by Mikheil Chiaureli

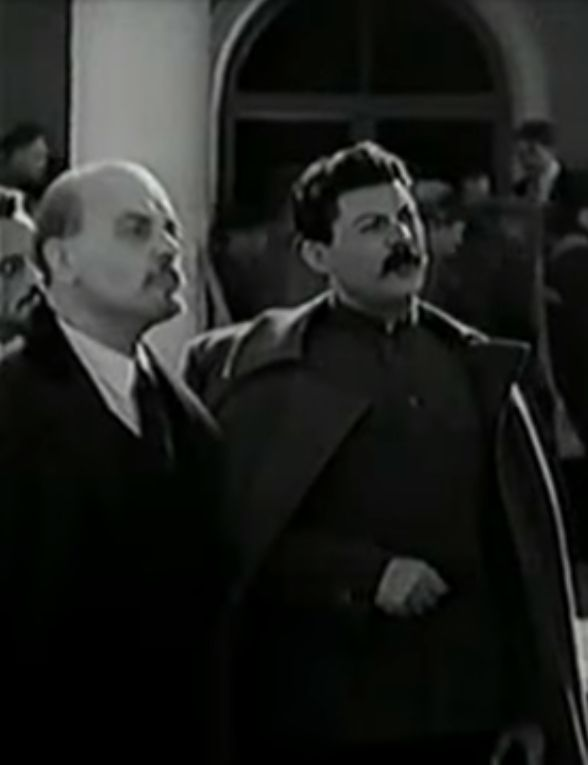
- Konstantin Müfke as Vladimir Lenin and Mikheil Gelovani as Joseph Stalin
- Directed by: Mikheil Chiaureli
- Written by: Giorgi Tsagareli
- Screenplay by: Pyotr Pavlenko, Giorgi Tsagareli
- Produced by: L. Totadze
- Starring: Mikheil Gelovani
- Cinematography: Aleqsandre Digmelovi
- Edited by: E. Gabrieli
- Music by: Ivane Gokieli
- Production company: Tbilisi Film Studio
- Release date: 6 November 1938
- Running time: 73 minutes
- Country: Soviet Union
- Language: Russian

External image
- 1938 poster of The Great Dawn.

The Great Dawn (Georgian: დიადი განთიადი, trans. Diadi Gant’iadi; Russian: Великое зарево, trans. Velikoe Zarevo. English-language title: They Wanted Peace.) is a 1938 Soviet Georgian film directed by Mikheil Chiaureli. It is considered a representation of Joseph Stalin's cult of personality.

== Plot ==
In 1917, the people of the Russian Empire are no longer willing to fight Germany, but the bourgeois government of Alexander Kerensky is unwilling to defy its imperialist allies and stop the war. Only Vladimir Lenin's Bolshevik Party is resolute in calling for peace. In the front, the soldiers of one battalion elect three delegates to travel to St. Petersburg with donations the troops collected for the Pravda newspaper: Gudushauri, Panasiuk and Ershov. The three arrive in the capital and describe the horrendous conditions in which the soldiers live to Joseph Stalin, Lenin's trusted aide and colleague. They join the Bolsheviks and take part in the storming of the Winter Palace, led by Stalin and Lenin. Stalin announces that the great dawn of revolution has broken.

== Cast ==
- Konstantin Müfke as Vladimir Lenin
- Mikheil Gelovani as Joseph Stalin
- Spartak Bagashvili as Georgi Gudushauri
- Tamara Makarova as Svetlana
- Nutsa Chkheidze as Gudushauri's mother
- Anna Smirnova as Svetlana's mother
- Basil Matov as Ershov
- Dmitry Ivanov as Panasyuk
- Georgi Sagaradze as Tsereteli
- Michael Chikhladze as Colonel Mikeladze
- Ivan Perestiani as general
- Alexander Zhorzholiani as surgeon
- Shalva Gambashidze as Karkumidze
- Georgi Shavgulidze as Paul Gudushauri
- Piotr Morskoi as Deryugin
- Boris Poltavtsev as Yakov Sverdlov

== Production ==
The Great Dawn was part of a group of films made in honor of the twentieth anniversary of the October Revolution, which also included Lenin in October and The Vyborg Side; since Sergei Eisenstein's October, it became customary to release pictures about the revolution with each decade anniversary to it. The Great Dawn was the first in a series of four films directed by Chiaureli with Joseph Stalin as their main theme. It also marked actor Mikheil Gelovani's first appearance on screen as Stalin, a role he would play in thirteen other productions.

== Reception ==
By April 1939, the picture was already viewed by some 15,000,000 people. In 1941, Chiaureli and Gelovani both won the Stalin Prize, 1st class, for their work on the film.

The Great Dawn was released in the United States in 1940. New York Times' critic interpreted its distribution there as being influenced by the signing of the Ribbentrop-Molotov Pact, writing: "conforming with the pact and the new party line, Soviet filmmakers now tell the world that the Russian and the German comrades would have reconciled back in 1917 if it hadn't been for the Anglo-French "imperialists"... The rest of it is in the familiar vein of Soviet lily-gilding."

Historian Peter Kenez viewed the film as the one "best anticipating the future of Stalin's image" in cinema, noting that Chiaureli allowed him to "escape Lenin's shadow" and turned him to the one the revolutionaries looked up to for leadership. Cinema scholar Nikolas Hülbusch regarded The Great Dawn as "the first contribution of the Tbilisi Studio to Stalin's cult of personality", noting that the premier's character began to exhibit the traits that would define it in later propaganda films, like the ability to mellow out the romantic relationships of his followers. Mira and Antonín J. Liehm commented that the picture was the first to clearly portray Stalin in the forefront of the Revolution and as Lenin's "closest collaborator and successor". Olga Romanova saw the film as the beginning of a long process, during which Lenin's image in cinema would slowly fade away and allow Stalin to take precedence.
