= Mikheil Chiaureli =

Soviet Georgian actor, film director and screenwriter

- მიხეილ ჭიაურელი
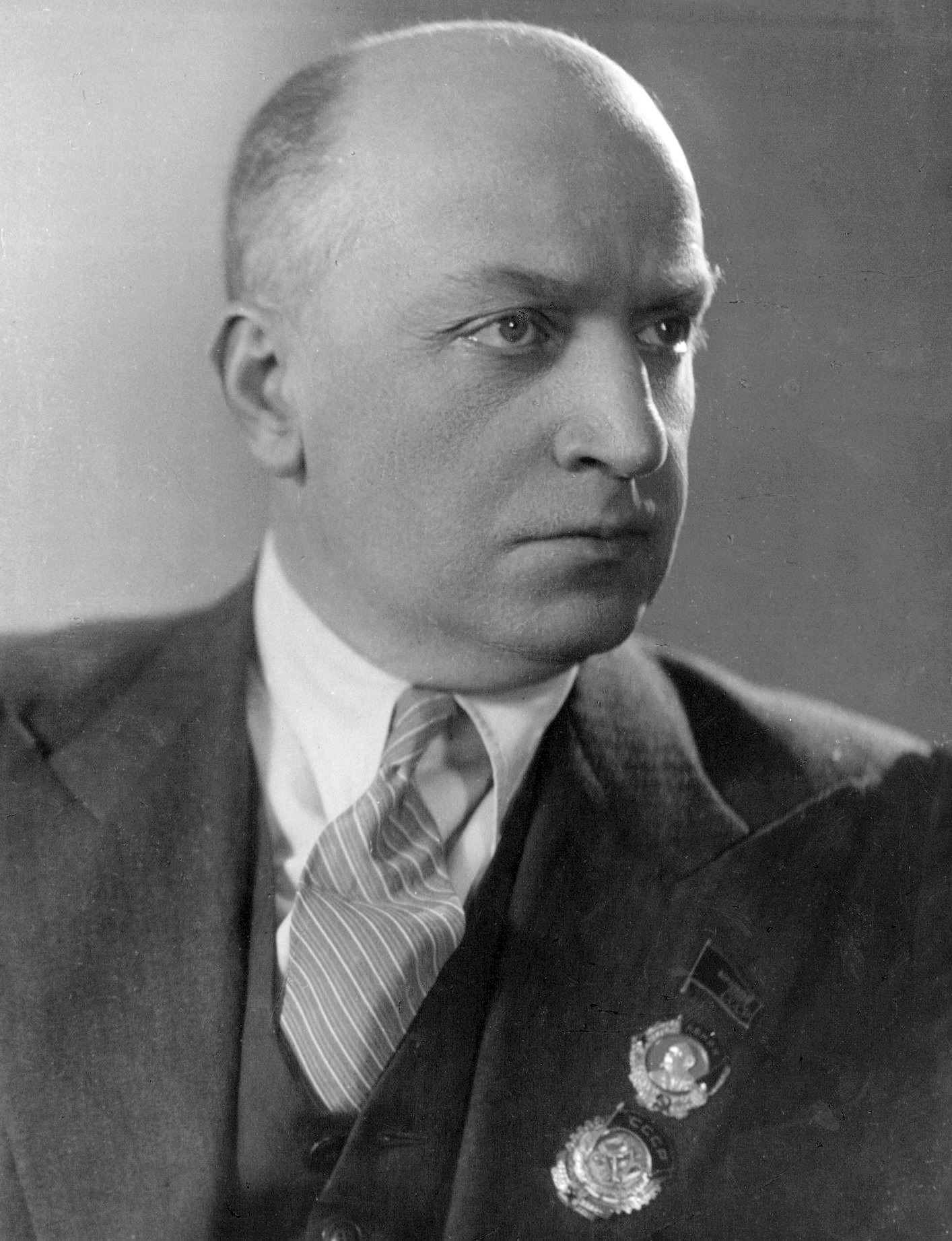
- Chiaureli in 1940
- Born: 6 February 1894; Tiflis, Russian Empire
- Died: 31 October 1974 (aged 80); Tbilisi, Georgian SSR, Soviet Union
- Resting place: Mtatsminda Pantheon, Tbilisi
- Occupations: Film director; screenwriter
- Notable work: The Fall of Berlin (1949)
- Title: People's Artist of the USSR (1948)
- Spouse: Veriko Anjaparidze
- Children: Sofiko Chiaureli
- Awards: Stalin Prize (1941, 1943, 1946, 1947, 1950)

Mikheil Chiaureli (Georgian: მიხეილ ჭიაურელი; Russian: Михаил Эдишерович Чиаурели, romanized: Mikhail Edisherovich Chiauerli; (Note: In this name that follows East Slavic naming customs, the patronymic is Edisherovich and the family name is Chiaureli.) 6 February 1894 – 31 October 1974) was a Soviet Georgian actor, film director and screenwriter. He directed 25 films between 1928 and 1974. He was awarded the Stalin Prize five times in 1941, 1943, 1946, 1947, and 1950.

== Biography ==
In early life, Chiaureli studied in a trade school and then worked for a while as a locksmith. Starting in amateur dramatics, he became a professional actor aged 20 and worked as both actor and stage-decorator at the Tbilisi theatre. After 1917, he studied acting formally at the Tbilisi Academy of Arts.

Chiaureli won four Stalin Prizes and became a deputy of the Supreme Soviet of the USSR.

== Selected filmography ==
as an actor

- Arsen Dzhordjiashvili (1921) as the star of the first Soviet film made in Georgia
- The Suram Fortress (1922)
- Iron Hard Labor (1924; Russian: Железная каторга)

as director

- The First Cornet Streshnev (1928)
- Saba (1929)
- Out of the Way! (1931)
- The Last Masquerade (1934)
- Arsen (1937)
- The Great Dawn (1938)
- Georgi Saakadze (1942)
- Klyatva (The Vow) (1946)
- The Fall of Berlin (1949)
- The Unforgettable Year 1919 (1952)
- The Widow Otarova (1957)
- The Story of a Girl (1960)
- Generals and Daisies (1964)
- Any Other Time (1967)
