= List of Georgian films of the 1920s =

A list of the films produced in the cinema of Georgia in the 1920s, ordered by year of release:

Title	Director	Cast	Genre	Studio/notes
1920
1921
Arsena Jorjiashvili	Ivan Perestiani	Mikheil Chiaureli	Historical drama	
1922
The Exile	Vladimir Barsky	Shalva Dadiani, Giorgi Davitashvili, Yelena Charskaya	Drama	
The Suram Fortress	Ivan Perestiani	Amo Bek-Nazaryan, Mikheil Chiaureli	Historical drama	
1923
Arsena, the Outlaw	Vladimir Barsky	Girgol Chechelashvili, Nato Vachnadze	Drama	
In the Pillory	Hamo Beknazarian	Vaso Arabidze, Nato Vachnadze, Akaki Vasadze	Drama	
Man is Enemy	Ivan Perestiani		Adventure	Lost
Red Imps	Ivan Perestiani	Zaqro Berishvili	Adventure	
1924
Before the Hurricane	Kote Mardjanishvili		Drama	Lost
The Lost Treasure	Hamo Beknazarian	Akaki Khorava	Drama	Partially lost
Three Lives	Ivan Perestiani	Nato Vachnadze, Mikheil Gelovani, Tsetsilia Tsutsunava		
1925
The Case of Tariel Mklavadze	Ivan Perestiani			
For the price of the thousand (The time is now)	Vladimir Barsky	Mikheil Chiaureli, Kleopatra Jashi, Akaki Khorava, Veriko Anjaparidze, Nato Vachnadze		
The secret of the lighthouse	Vladimir Barsky	Kleopatra Jashi, Akaki Khorava		
Horrors of the Past	Vladimir Barsky	Akaki Khorava, Veriko Andjaparidze	Drama	
Who Is the Guilty?	Aleqsandre Tsutsunava	Kote Miqaberidze, Tsetsilia Tsutsunava, Nato Vachnadze	Drama	
1926
Savur-Mogila	Ivan Perestiani			
Duchess Meri	Vladimir Barsky			
The 9th wave	Vladimir Barsky			
The stepmother of Samanishvili	Kote Marjanishvili, Zaqaria Berishvili	Akaki Vasadze, Cecilia Tsutsunava, Shalva Ghabashidze		
The Crime of Shirvanskaya	Ivan Perestiani			
Khanuma	Aleqsandre Tsutsunava			
The Punishment of Shirvanskaya	Ivan Perestiani			
Ilan-dili	Ivan Perestiani			
Natela	Hamo Beknazarian			
1927
Amoki	Kote Mardjanishvili			
Gogi Ratiani	Kote Mardjanishvili			
Ibrahimi and Goderdzi	Zaqharia Berishvili			
Galosh No. 18	Elene Osinskaya			
Maksim Maksimich	Vladimir Barsky			
Rule of Mountain	Boris Michin			
Miss Kathie and Mr. Jack	Anatoli Durov			
Mitka, Petka and Chemberlen	Aleksander Segel			
Two Hunters	Aleksander Tsutsunava			
Two frolicsome	Nikoloz Kakhidze			
Giuli	Nikoloz Shengelaia, Lev Push			
Spending	Ivan Perestiani			
Bela	Vladimir Barsky			
Nest of Wasps	Ivan Perestiani			
In the Bog	Ivan Perestiani			
1928
The Youth Wins	Mikheil Gelovani			
Gipsy Blood	Lev Push			
Eliso	Nikoloz Shengelaia	Kira Andronikashvili, Kokhta karalashvili, Aleksandre Imedashvili, Maro Chmshkiani, Aleksandre (Sandro) Jhorjholiani	Drama	
Cosacks	Vladimir Barsky			
The Wasp	Kote Marjanishvili			
Yough Pilot	Nikoloz Kakhidze			
The first Korneti Streshniov	Ephim Dzigani			
Woman from bazar	Giorgi Makarov			
Shelter of the Clouds	Zaqharia Berishvili			
Five Minutes	Aleksander Balagin			
Revolt in Guria	Aleksander Tsutsunava			
On the Holt	Leo Esakia			
1929
The white warrior (God of the war)	Ephim Dzigani			
Pipe of the Communar	Kote Marjanishvili			
Saba	Mikheil Chiaureli			
Cell 79	Zaqharia Berishvili			
At the last minute	Mikheil Chiaureli			
My Grandmother	Kote Mikaberidze			Reissued with an original score by Beth Custer
Fast No. 2	Giorgi Makarov			
