= List of films about revolutionary terrorism in the Russian Empire =

Below is an incomplete list of feature films, television films or television series which include events of the Revolutionary terrorism in the Russian Empire. This list does not include documentaries, short films.

== 1920s ==
Year	Country	Main title (Alternative title)	Original title (Original script)	Director	Subject
1920	Weimar Republic	Daughter of the Night	Der Tanz auf dem Vulkan; Sybil Joung; Der Tod des Großfürsten	Richard Eichberg	Drama.
1921	Soviet Union	The Murder of General Gryaznov	არსენა ჯორჯიაშვილი Убийство Генерала Грязнова; Арсен Джорджиашвили	Ivan Perestiani	Action, Adventure. Arsen Gjorjiashvili
1922	Weimar Republic	Love One Another	Die Gezeichneten	Carl Theodor Dreyer	Drama. Based on the novel Elsker hverandre.
1924	Soviet Union	The Palace and the Fortress	Дворец и крепость	Aleksandr Ivanovsky	Based on the novel Clad in Stone and the story The Mysterious Prisoner. Mikhail Beideman
1925	Soviet Union	Stepan Khalturin	Степан Халтурин	Aleksandr Ivanovsky	Stepan Khalturin, Narodnaya Volya, The Explosion at the Winter Palace
1925	Soviet Union	Nightmares of the Past (Iron Cohort)	Кошмары прошлого Железная когорта	Vladimir Barsky	Drama, Action, Crime.
1925	Soviet Union	Horrors of the Past 2 (Iron Hard Labor)	Кошмары прошлого (вторая серия); Ценою тысяч Расплата; Час настал ათასის ფასად (დაჰკრა ჟამმა)	Vladimir Barsky	Action, Adventure, Drama, Romance.
1926	Soviet Union	Mother	Мать	Vsevolod Pudovkin	Drama. Based on the novel Mother.
1926	Soviet Union	Engine driver Ukhtomsky	Машинист Ухтомский	Aleksey A. Dmitriev	Alexei Ukhtomsky, Moscow uprising of 1905
1926	Soviet Union	The Ninth Wave	Девятый вал Девятая волна	Vladimir Barsky	Action, Adventure, Drama.
1928	Soviet Union; United States	His Excellency (Seeds of Freedom)	Его превосходительство	Grigori Roshal	Drama. Hirsh Lekert, General Jewish Labour Bund, Viktor von Wahl
1928	Soviet Union	The White Eagle	Белый орёл	Yakov Protazanov	Drama, History. Based on the story Governor.
1928	Soviet Union	Provocateur (A Tangled Web)	Провокатор; Его карьера В паутине	Viktor Turin	Drama. Based on the novel There were three of us.
1929	Weimar Republic	The Adjutant of the Czar	Der Adjutant des Zaren	Vladimir Strizhevsky	
1929	Soviet Union	The House on the Volcano	Дом на вулкане	Hamo Beknazarian	Drama.
1929	Soviet Union	Sixteenth	Шестнадцатый; Տասնվեցերորդը	Patvakan Barkhudaryan	Drama.

== 1930s ==
Year	Country	Main title (Alternative title)	Original title (Original script)	Director	Subject
1930	Weimar Republic	The Citadel of Warsaw	Die Warschauer Zitadelle	Jacob Fleck; Luise Fleck	Based on the play Tamten.
1930	Poland	Exile to Siberia	Na Sybir	Henryk Szaro	
1930	Finland	Reflection	Kajastus	Carl von Haartman	Drama, History.
1930	Soviet Union	American Woman	Американка	Leo Esakia	Action, Adventure, Drama, History. Underground Printing House, 1905–1906
1931	Poland	The Ten from Pawiak Prison	Dziesięciu z Pawiaka	Ryszard Ordyński	Action, Drama, Romance. Based on the memoirs of Jan Jur-Gorzechowski.
1933	Soviet Union	A soldier's son	Солдатский сын	Nikolay Lebedev	Drama.
1934	Poland	The General Pankratov's Daughter	Córka generała Pankratowa	Józef Lejtes; Mieczysław Znamierowski	Drama, History, Romance.
1934	Soviet Union	The Last Masquerade	Последний маскарад	Mikheil Chiaureli	Drama, Romance, War.
1935	Austria; Nazi Germany	Asew	Lockspitzel Asew	Phil Jutzi	Yevno Azef
1935	Soviet Union	The Youth of Maxim	Юность Максима	Grigori Kozintsev; Leonid Trauberg	Drama, History, War.
1936	France	Under Western Eyes	Razumov: Sous les yeux d'occident	Marc Allégret	Drama. Based on the novel Under Western Eyes.
1936	Poland	The Rose	Róża	Józef Lejtes	Drama, History, Romance. Based on the play Róża.
1936	Soviet Union	Generation of Victors	Поколение победителей	Vera Stroyeva	Drama, History.
1936	Soviet Union	Three from the Same Street	Трое с одной улицы	Nikolai Shpikovsky	Adventure.
1937	Nazi Germany	The Citadel of Warsaw	Die Warschauer Zitadelle	Fritz Peter Buch	Based on the play Tamten.
1937	Soviet Union	The Return of Maxim	Возвращение Максима	Grigori Kozintsev; Leonid Trauberg	Drama.
1937	United Kingdom	Knight Without Armour		Jacques Feyder	Adventure, Drama, History, Romance, Thriller. Based on the novel Knight Without Armour.
1937	Soviet Union	The Lonely White Sail	Белеет парус одинокий	Vladimir Legoshin	Adventure. Based on the story A solitary sail turns white.
1938	France	Katia		Maurice Tourneur	Drama. Based on the novel Princesse Mathe Bibesco. Catherine Dolgorukova, Alexander II of Russia, Assassination of Alexander II of Russia
1938	Finland	The Stolen Death	Varastettu kuolema	Nyrki Tapiovaara	Romance, Thriller. Based on the story Lihamylly. The first period of oppression
1938	Soviet Union	Baku residents	Бакинцы; Bakılılar	Viktor Turin	Drama, History.
1938	Soviet Union	Enemies	Враги	Aleksandr Ivanovsky	Drama. Based on the play Enemies.
1939	Finland	Activists	Aktivistit; Aktivisterna	Risto Orko	Drama, History, Thriller. Activism during times of oppression, Second period of oppression
1939	Finland	February Manifesto	Helmikuun manifesti	Yrjö Norta; Toivo Särkkä	Drama.

== 1940s ==
Year	Country	Main title (Alternative title)	Original title (Original script)	Director	Subject
1940	Soviet Union	Yakov Sverdlov	Яков Свердлов	Sergei Yutkevich	Biography, Drama. Yakov Sverdlov
1949	Soviet Union		Райнис; Rainis	Yuli Raizman	Biography, History. Rainis

== 1950s ==
Year	Country	Main title (Alternative title)	Original title (Original script)	Director	Subject
1953	Soviet Union	Enemies	Враги	Tamara Rodionova	Drama. Based on the play Enemies.
1955	Soviet Union	Mother	Мать	Mark Donskoy	Drama. Based on the novel Mother.
1956	Soviet Union	Early Joys	Первые радости	Vladimir Basov	Drama. Based on the novel Early Joys.
1956	Soviet Union	Following the Swan Flock of Clouds	За лебединой стаей облаков Kā gulbji balti padebeši iet	Pavel Armand	Drama, History. Jānis Fabriciuss, Jute Rebellion
1956	Soviet Union	Bloody Dawn	Кровавый рассвет	Aleksei Shvachko	Drama. Based on the story Fata Morgana.
1956	Soviet Union	Prologue	Пролог	Yefim Dzigan	Drama.
1956	Soviet Union	The Adventures of Artyomka	Приключения Артёмки	Andrei Apsolon	Drama. Based on the story Artyomka at the Circus.
1957	Soviet Union	Woman's Destiny	Судьба женщины ქალის ტვირთი	Nikoloz Sanishvili	Drama, Romance. Based on the novel Woman's Destiny.
1957	Soviet Union	The Ulyanov family	Семья Ульяновых	Valentin Nevzorov	Biography, Drama. Based on the play Family. Blank family
1957	Soviet Union	Stepan Kolchugin	Степан Кольчугин	Tamara Rodionova	Based on the novel Stepan Kolchugin.
1957	Soviet Union	Personally Known	Лично известен	Stepan Kevorkov; Erazm Karamyan; Gurgen Balasanyan	Action. Kamo
1957	Soviet Union	Pages of the Past	Страницы былого	Yevgeny Tashkov	Drama.
1957	Soviet Union	Abrupt Stairs	Крутые ступени	Sigizmund Navrotsky	Drama.
1957	Soviet Union	Martin	Ласточка	Grigori Lipshits	Adventure, History.
1958	East Germany	Mother	Die Mutter	Manfred Wekwerth; Harry Bremer	Drama. Based on the novel Mother.
1958	Soviet Union	This Is How Mayakovsky Began	Маяковский начинался так…	Konstantine Pipinashvili	Biography, Drama, Family, History. Based on the story I myself. Vladimir Mayakovsky
1959	France	Magnificent Sinner	Katia	Robert Siodmak	Drama, History, Romance. Based on the novel Princesse Mathe Bibesco. Catherine Dolgorukova, Alexander II of Russia, Assassination of Alexander II of Russia
1959	Soviet Union	Tavriya	Таврия	Yuriy Lysenko	Drama. Based on the novel Tavriya.

== 1960s ==
Year	Country	Main title (Alternative title)	Original title (Original script)	Director	Subject
1960	Soviet Union	Michman Panin	Мичман Панин	Mikhail Schweitzer	Adventure, History, War. Vasily Panyushkin
1960	Soviet Union	The Secret of the Green Forest	Тайна зелёного бора	Oleg Nikolayevsky	Adventure. Based on the story Green Grasshopper.
1961	Soviet Union	Vasily Dokuchaev	Василий Докучаев	Andrey Chiginskiy	Biography. Vasily Dokuchaev
1961	Soviet Union	At the beginning of the century	В начале века	Anatoli Rybakov	Biography, History. Vladimir Lenin
1964	Soviet Union	Comrade Arseny	Товарищ Арсений	Ivan Lukinsky	Drama, History. Mikhail Frunze
1965	Soviet Union	A Mother's Heart	Сердце матери	Mark Donskoy	Drama. Based on the book A Mother's Heart. Maria Ulyanova
1965	Soviet Union	The First Bastille	Первая Бастилия	Mikhail Yershov	Biography, History. Vladimir Lenin
1965	Soviet Union	The Unconquered Battalion	Непокорённый батальон Yenilməz batalyon	Huseyn Seyidzadeh	Drama. Based on the novel Qalada üsyan.
1966	Soviet Union	A Mother's Devotion	Верность матери	Mark Donskoy	Biography, Drama. Based on the book A Mother's Heart. Maria Ulyanova
1967	Soviet Union	Sofiya Perovskaya	Софья Перовская	Lev Arnshtam	Biography, Drama, History. Sophia Perovskaya, Narodnaya Volya, Pervomartovtsy, Assassination of Alexander II of Russia
1967	Soviet Union	Nikolay Bauman	Николай Бауман	Semyon Tumanov	Drama. Nikolay Bauman
1967	Soviet Union	Sea Tales	Морские рассказы	Aleksey Sakharov; Aleksandr Svetlov	Adventure. Based on the stories The Scam and The Scorpion and the Cotton Wool.
1967	Soviet Union	Rebellious Outpost	Мятежная застава	Adolf Bergunker	History. The Obukhov Defense
1968	Soviet Union	Angel Day	День ангела	Stanislav Govorukhin	Action, Drama. Based on the story Mechanic Salerno.
1968	Soviet Union; Bulgaria	The First Courier	Первый курьер Първият куриер	Vladimir Yanchev	Drama, History. Ivan Zagubanski, Iskra
1968	Soviet Union	Tariel Golua	Тариэл Голуа ტარიელ გოლუა	Levan Khotivari	Action, Romance. Based on the novel Tariel Golua.
1969	Soviet Union	Dangerous Tour	Опасные гастроли	Georgi Yungvald-Khilkevich	Action, History. Alexandra Kollontai, Maxim Litvinov
1969	Soviet Union	Romance by Mail	Почтовый роман	Yevgeny Matveyev	Drama, History, Romance. Pyotr Schmidt

== 1970s ==
Year	Country	Main title (Alternative title)	Original title (Original script)	Director	Subject
1970	Soviet Union	Republic of Voronya Street	Республика Вороньей улицы Vārnu ielas republika	Ada Neretniece	Family. Based on the story Vārnu ielas republika.
1970	Soviet Union	A small farmstead in the steppe	Хуторок в степи	Boris Buneev	Adventure. Based on the novel A Small Farmstead in the Steppe.
1970	Soviet Union	Delayed-Action Explosion	Взрыв замедленного действия	Valeriu Gagiu	Action, History. Based on the novel The Mysterious Ti.
1971	United Kingdom	Nicholas and Alexandra		Franklin J. Schaffner	Biography, Drama, History, War. Based on the book Nicholas and Alexandra. Nicholas II, Alexandra Feodorovna
1971	Soviet Union	I Am Coming to You...	Иду к тебе…	Nikolay Mashchenko	Biography, Drama. Lesya Ukrainka, Sergei Merzhinsky
1971	Soviet Union; Estonia	Coast of the Winds	Берег ветров Tuuline rand	Kaljo Kiisk	Drama. Based on the novel Tuuline rand.
1972	Italy	Lions of St. Petersburg	I leoni di Pietroburgo	Mario Siciliano	Action, Drama, History, Romance.
1972	Soviet Union	Find me, Lyonya!	Найди меня, Лёня!	Nikolay Lebedev	Drama. Based on the story Dinka.
1972	Soviet Union	The Last Hajduk	Последний гайдук	Valeriu Gagiu	Action, War. Grigory Kotovsky
1973	Soviet Union	Hope	Надежда	Mark Donskoy	Biography, Drama, History. Nadezhda Krupskaya
1974	Soviet Union	Attack on the secret police	Нападение на тайную полицию Uzbrukums slepenpolicijai	Oļģerts Dunkers	Adventure, Biography, History. Based on the novel Saucēja balss. Attack on Riga Police Department, The Revolution of 1905–1907 in Riga, Latvian Social Democratic Workers' Party
1975	Soviet Union	White hood	Белый башлык	Vladimir Savelev	Biography, Drama, History. Based on a poem Song of the Rock.
1975	Soviet Union	Escape at Dawn	Побег на рассвете გაქცევა გათენებისას	Siko Dolidze	Action, Adventure.
1976	Poland	Red thorns	Czerwone ciernie	Julian Dziedzina	Drama, History. Based on the novella Czas pojedna, trawa porośnie.
1976	Finland; Soviet Union	Trust	Доверие; Luottamus	Edvin Laine; Viktor Tregubovich	Drama, History.
1977	Soviet Union	Jailbreak	Побег из тюрьмы	Radomir Vasilevsky	Adventure, History. Based on the story Escape.
1977	Soviet Union	Enemies	Враги	Rodion Nakhapetov	Drama. Based on the play Enemies.
1978	Poland; Soviet Union; East Germany	Identification Marks - None	Особых примет нет Znaków szczególnych brak	Anatoliy Bobrovskiy	Biography, Drama, History, Thriller. Based on the novel Combustion. Felix Dzerzhinsky
1978	Soviet Union	Rebel barricade	Мятежная баррикада	Yuri Shvyryov	Drama. Fyodor Sergeyev

== 1980s ==
Year	Country	Main title (Alternative title)	Original title (Original script)	Director	Subject
1980	Soviet Union; Estonia	Christmas in Vigala	Рождество в Вигала; Jõulud Vigalas	Mark Soosaar	Drama. Old Vigala Manor, Bernhard Laipman
1980	Soviet Union	House on Lesnaya Street	Дом на Лесной	Nikoloz Sanishvili	Drama. Underground Printing House, 1905–1906
1980	Soviet Union	Story of an Unknown Man	Рассказ неизвестного человека	Vytautas Žalakevičius	Drama, Romance. Based on the novella The Story of an Unknown Man. Narodnaya Volya
1981	Poland	Fever	Gorączka	Agnieszka Holland	Drama, History. Based on the novel The Story of a Single Bullet. Combat Organization of the Polish Socialist Party, Revolution in the Kingdom of Poland (1905–1907)
1981	Poland	In Broad Daylight	W biały dzień	Edward Żebrowski	Drama, History. Based on the novel Zwierzęta zostały opłacone. Stanisław Brzozowski
1981	Soviet Union; East Germany	Two Lines in Small Font	Две строчки мелким шрифтом Zwei Zeilen, kleingedruckt	Vitaly Melnikov	Drama, History.
1981	Soviet Union	Comrade Innokenty	Товарищ Иннокентий	Yevgeni Mezentsev; Iosif Shapiro	Adventure, History. Iosif Dubrovinsky
1982	Soviet Union	We Weren't Married in Church	Нас венчали не в церкви	Boris Tokarev	History, Romance. Based on the notes and letters of Sergey Sinegub.
1982	Soviet Union	Brother	Брат ძმა	Temur Babluani	Adventure, History.
1982	Soviet Union	It is not possible to execute	Казнить не представляется возможным	Isaak Shmaruk	Biography, Drama, History. Boris Zhadanovsky
1981	Soviet Union	Scattered Nest	Раскиданное гнездо	Boris Lutsenko	Drama. Based on the play Scattered Nest.
1984	Soviet Union	Knights of the black lake	Рыцари чёрного озера Qara gölün cəngavərləri	Anvar Abluc	Drama. Based on the story Sandpiper.
1986	Soviet Union	Vosstaniya Square	Площадь Восстания	Boris Tokarev	Drama. Based on the story Vosstaniya Square.
1986	Soviet Union	Vera	Вера	Igor Musatov	Drama, History.
1986	Soviet Union	The Mysterious Prisoner	Таинственный узник	Valeriu Gagiu	Adventure, Drama. Based on a novel Clad in Stone. Mikhail Beideman
1987	Soviet Union	If we endure it all	Если мы все это перенесем... Ja mēs visu to pārcietīsim	Rolands Kalniņš	Drama. Based on the Robežnieki trilogy.
1987	Soviet Union	Khareba and Gogi	Хареба и Гоги ხარება და გოგია	Giorgi Shengelaia	Adventure, Drama.
1987	Soviet Union	I Have Honour	Честь имею	Oleg Tulayev	Adventure.
1988	France	The Possessed	Les Possédés	Andrzej Wajda	Drama. Based on the novel Demons.
1989	Soviet Union; Italy	Mother	Мать	Gleb Panfilov	Drama, History. Based on the novel Mother.

== 1990s ==
Year	Country	Main title (Alternative title)	Original title (Original script)	Director	Subject
1991	Soviet Union; United Kingdom	The Assassin of the Tsar	Цареубийца	Karen Shakhnazarov	Drama, History.
1991	Soviet Union	Spawn of Hell	Исчадье ада	Vasiliy Panin	Crime, Drama, Romance. Based on the novella The Pale Horse.
1991	Soviet Union	Birthday gift	Подарунок на іменини	Leonid Osyka	Drama. Based on the works of Mykhailo Kotsiubynsky.
1991	Soviet Union	Night of Sinners (The Highest Truth of Bomber Alexei)	Ночь грешников Высшая истина бомбиста Алексея	Vadim Kostromenko	Drama, Romance. Based on the story Darkness.
1991	Soviet Union	Governor	Губернаторъ	Vladimir Makeranets	Drama. Based on the story Governor.
1992	Poland	The Scoundrel	Kanalia	Tomasz Wiszniewski	Action, Drama, History. Combat Organization of the Polish Socialist Party
1992	Russia	The Possessed	Бесы	Igor Talankin; Dmitri Talankin	Drama. Based on the novel Demons.
1992	France; Russia	The Darkness	Тьма	Igor Maslennikov	Drama. Based on the story Darkness.
1995	United Kingdom; Poland; Czech Republic; France	Provocateur	Prowokator	Krzysztof Lang	Crime, Drama.
1995	France; Russia; Italy	Secrets Shared with a Stranger	Откровения незнакомцу Confidences à un inconnu	Georges Bardawil	Crime, Drama. Based on the novella The Last Pages from a Woman's Diary.

== 2000s ==
Year	Country	Main title (Alternative title)	Original title (Original script)	Director	Subject
2003	United Kingdom	The Petersburg-Cannes Express		John Daly	Based on the novel The Petersburg-Cannes Express.
2004	Russia	The Rider Named Death	Всадник по Имени Смерть	Karen Shakhnazarov	Drama. Based on the novella The Pale Horse and the book Memoirs of a Terrorist.
2005	Russia	The State Counsellor	Статский советник	Filipp Yankovsky	Crime, Drama, Mystery. Based on the novel The State Counsellor.
2005	Finland	Shadow of the Eagle	Kaksipäisen kotkan varjossa	Timo Koivusalo	Drama, History, Musical. Russification of Finland
2008	Italy	The Demons of St. Petersberg	I demoni di San Pietroburgo	Giuliano Montaldo	Biography, Drama, History. Fyodor Dostoevsky

== 2010s ==
Year	Country	Main title (Alternative title)	Original title (Original script)	Director	Subject
2010	Germany; Austria; Estonia	The Poll Diaries	Poll	Chris Kraus	Drama.
2014	Russia	Demons	Бесы	Roman Shalyapin	Drama. Based on the novel Demons.
2019	Poland	The Marshal	Piłsudski	Michał Rosa	Biography, History. Józef Piłsudski, Combat Organization of the Polish Socialist Party
2019	Latvia		1906	Gatis Šmits	Drama. Based on the play 1906. Trakāk vēl kā piektā gadā. The 1905 Revolution in Latvia

== Television films ==
Year	Country	Main title (Alternative title)	Original title (Original script)	Director	Subject
1962	West Germany	The Possessed	Die Besessenen	Michael Kehlmann	Drama. Based on the novel Demons.
1962	United Kingdom	Under Western Eyes			Drama. Based on the novel Under Western Eyes.
1963	Soviet Union	Listen-ow!..	Слуша-ай!..	Meri Anjaparidze	Drama. Based on the stories of Yuri German. Felix Dzerzhinsky
1964	Soviet Union	Executed at dawn...	Казнены на рассвете…	Yevgeny Andrikanis	Aleksandr Ulyanov, Terrorist Faction, Narodnaya Volya
1965	Soviet Union	Through Icy Mist	Сквозь ледяную мглу	Arkadi Koltsaty; Lev Rudnik	Biography, History. Based on the stories of Zoya Voskresenskaya. Vladimir Lenin
1968	Soviet Union	...And May Again!	…И снова май!	Mariya Muat	Adventure, History. Based on an unknown short story.
1968	Czechoslovakia	Ballad of the Seven Hanged	Balada o siedmich obesených Balada o sedmi oběšených	Martin Hollý	Drama. Based on the novella The Seven Who Were Hanged.
1968	Soviet Union	Lights	Огоньки	Nikolay Khrobko	Comedy, Music. Based on the operetta Lights.
1968	Soviet Union	The password is “Little Red Riding Hood”	Пароль 'Красная Шапочка'	Angela Isaeva	
1970	Soviet Union	Confusion	Смятение	Andrey Bulinskiy	Based on the story A Little House on the Volga.
1971	West Germany	Mother	Die Mutter	Wolfgang Schwiedrzik; Frank-Patrick Steckel; Peter Stein	Based on the novel Mother.
1974	United States	Enemies		Kirk Browning; Ellis Rabb	Comedy, Drama, Music, Musical. Based on the play Enemies.
1975	United Kingdom	Under Western Eyes		Stuart Burge	Drama. Based on the novel Under Western Eyes.
1975	France	Azev: The Tsar of the Night	Azev: le tsar de la nuit	Guy Lessertisseur	Based on the play Azev: le tsar de la nuit. Yevno Azef
1976	West Germany	Enemies	Feinde	Frank Guthke	Drama. Based on the play Enemies.
1979	West Germany	Story of an Unknown Man	Erzählung eines Unbekannten	Peter Vogel	Romance. Based on the novella The Story of an Unknown Man. Narodnaya Volya
1981	Soviet Union	It Was Beyond the Narva Gate	Это было за Нарвской заставой	Viktor Okuntsov	Comedy, History, Musical.
1981	East Germany	Mother	Die Mutter	Wolfgang Heinz	Drama. Based on the novel Mother.
1982	Finland	The Seven Who Were Hanged	Seitsemän hirtetyn tarina	Jarmo Nieminen	Drama. Based on the novella The Seven Who Were Hanged.
1985	Soviet Union	Ally of the proletariat	Союзник пролетариата	Vilen Vizilter	Markovo Republic
1985	Soviet Union	Do your duty	Исполнить свой долг	Vladimir Demin	3rd Congress of the Russian Social Democratic Labour Party, Council of Workers' Deputies
1986	Soviet Union	Path	Путь	Anatoly Vasiliev; Valerie Sarkisoff	Based on the play Path. Aleksandr Ulyanov
1992	Finland	Five Shots in the Senate	Viisi laukausta senaatissa Fem skott i senaten	Åke Lindman	Drama, History. Based on the book Viisi laukausta senaatissa, Eugen Schaumanin elämä ja teko. Eugen Schauman, Nikolay Bobrikov, Assassination of Nikolay Bobrikov
1998	United States	Crime and Punishment		Joseph Sargent	Drama. Based on the novel Crime and Punishment.

== Television series ==
Year	Country	Main title (Alternative title)	Original title (Original script)	Director	Subject
1960-1	Soviet Union	First Tests	Первые испытания	Vladimir Korsh-Sablin	Based on the novel At the Crossroads.
1969	United Kingdom	The Possessed		Naomi Capon	Horror. Based on the novel Demons.
1971	Soviet Union	The Kotsiubynsky Family	Семья Коцюбинских	Timofei Levchuk	Drama, Romance, War. Mykhailo Kotsiubynsky
1972	Italy	The Possessed	I demoni	Sandro Bolchi	Drama. Based on the novel Demons.
1972	Soviet Union		Тадас Блинда; Tadas Blinda	Balys Bratkauskas	Action, Adventure, Biography. Tadas Blinda
1972	Soviet Union; Finland		Свеаборг; Viaporin kapina Sveaborg	Sergey Kolosov	History. Based on the story Sveaborg. Sveaborg rebellion
1972	Soviet Union	Enemies	Враги	Aleksandr Karev; Mariya Muat; Mikhail Kedrov	Drama. Based on the play Enemies.
1974	United Kingdom	Fall of Eagles			Drama, History, War.
1976	Soviet Union	Waves of the Black Sea	Волны Чёрного моря	Viacheslav Kryshtofovych; Artur Voytetsky; Oleg Goyda	Drama. Based on the story A solitary sail turns white.
1977	Austria; West Germany	The demons	Die Dämonen	Claus Peter Witt	Based on the novel Demons.
1977	Soviet Union	First joys	Первые радости	Grigori Nikulin	Drama, History, Romance. Based on the novel Early Joys.
1978	Soviet Union	Artyom	Артём	Nikolay Koshelev; Valentin Morozov	Biography, Drama. Fyodor Sergeyev
1979	Soviet Union	Siberiade	Сибириада	Andrei Konchalovsky	Drama, History, Romance, War.
1979	Soviet Union	Wait for "John Grafton"	Ждите «Джона Графтона» Gaidiet «Džonu Graftonu»	Andris Rozenbergs	SS John Grafton
1979	Soviet Union	The Legend of the Clown	Легенда о скоморохе Լեգենդ ծաղրածուի մասին	Edmond Keosayan; Levon Asatryan	Comedy.
1980	Mexico	Mother	La madre	Wiebaldo Lopez	Drama. Based on the novel Mother.
1983	Soviet Union	Early, Early Morning...	Раннее, раннее утро...	Valeriy Kharchenko	Family. Based on the story Dinka.
1985	Soviet Union	Ivan Babushkin	Иван Бабушкин	Georgiy Kuznetsov	Biography, History. Based on the story Sechen. Ivan Babushkin
1985	Soviet Union	Unranked	Не имеющий чина	Olgerd Vorontsov	Biography, History. Mikhail Frunze
1987	Soviet Union	Wounded Stones	Раненые камни	Nikolay Zaseev-Rudenko	Drama, History.
1988	Soviet Union	The Life of Klim Samgin	Жизнь Клима Самгина	Viktor Titov	Drama, History. Based on the novel The Life of Klim Samgin.
1988	Soviet Union	Bring back the past...	Прошедшее вернуть...	Valeriy Kharchenko	Drama, History.
1993	Russia	Split	Раскол	Sergey Kolosov	History. Russian Social Democratic Labour Party, 2nd Congress of the Russian Social Democratic Labour Party
1993	Belarus	The Emperor's Romance	Роман императора	Diamara Nizhnikovskaya	Drama, History. Catherine Dolgorukova, Alexander II of Russia, Assassination of Alexander II of Russia
2000	Russia	Empire Under Attack	Империя под ударом	Sergey Gazarov; Andrei Malyukov; Zinovy Roizman; Vyacheslav Nikiforov; Sergey Snezhkin; Ivan Krivoruchko	Action, Crime, History, Mystery. Okhrana, Combat Organization of the Socialist Revolutionary Party
2001	Poland	Marshal Pilsudski	Marszałek Piłsudski	Andrzej Trzos-Rastawiecki	Biography, War. Józef Piłsudski
2002	Russia	The Emperor's Love	Любовь императора	Aleksandr Orlov; Tatyana Egorycheva; Svetlana Guralskaya	History. Based on the book A Chronicle of Love and Death. Catherine Dolgorukova, Alexander II of Russia, Assassination of Alexander II of Russia
2004-5	Russia	Sins of the Fathers	Грехи отцов	Roman Nesterenko; Vera Kharybina; Petr Krotenko; Stanislav Libin; Alexander Smirnov; Maxim Mokrushev; Alla Plotkina; Vladimir Filimonov	Drama.
2005	Russia	Gentlemen of the jury	Господа присяжные	Evgeniy Ivanov	Drama, Mystery, Romance.
2006	Russia	Demons	Бесы	Valery Akhadov; Gennady Karyuk	Drama. Based on the novel Demons.
2006	Russia	His Majesty's Secret Service	Секретная служба Его Величества	Igor Kalyonov	Crime.
2007	Russia	Savva Morozov	Савва Морозов	Oleg Safaraliyev	Biography, Drama, Thriller. Savva Morozov
2010	Russia; Ukraine	Kotovskiy	Котовский	Stanislav Nazirov	Adventure, Drama, History. Grigory Kotovsky
2014	Russia	Demons	Бесы	Vladimir Khotinenko	Drama, Mystery. Based on the novel Demons.
2017	Russia	Trotsky	Троцкий	Alexander Kott; Konstantin Statsky	Biography, Drama, History. Leon Trotsky
2017	Russia	Wings of the Empire	Крылья империи	Igor Kopylov	Drama.
2018-20	Poland	Conspirators	Młody Piłsudski	Jarosław Marszewski	Biography, Drama, History. Józef Piłsudski, Combat Organization of the Polish Socialist Party
2019	Finland	The Activists	Aktivistit; Aktivisterna	Lauri Maijala	Drama, History.
2022	Russia	Karamora	Карамора	Danila Kozlovsky	Fantasy, History, Thriller.
2025-6	Russia	Chronicles of the Russian Revolution	Хроники русской революции	Andrei Konchalovsky	Drama, History.
