= List of Soviet films of 1924 =

A list of films produced in the Soviet Union in 1924 (see 1924 in film).

== 1924 ==
Title	Russian title	Director	Cast	Genre	Notes
1924
The Adventures of Oktyabrina	Похождения Октябрины	Grigori Kozintsev, Leonid Trauberg	Zinaida Torkhovskaya, Yevgeni Kumeiko, Sergei Martinson, Antonio Tserep	Comedy	Lost film
Aelita	Аэли́та	Yakov Protazanov	Yulia Solntseva, Igor Ilyinsky, Nikolai Tsereteli, Nikolai Batalov, Vera Orlova	Science fiction	
The Gang of Old Man Knysh	Банда батьки Кныша	Aleksandr Razumny	Pyotr Leontyev, Aleksandr Khachaturyants, Boris Shlikhting	Adventure	
Before the Hurricane	Буревестник	Kote Marjanishvili	Lado Kavsadze	Drama	
The Cigarette Girl from Mosselprom	Папиросница от Моссельпрома	Yuri Zhelyabuzhsky	Igor Ilyinsky, Yuliya Solntseva, Nikolai Tseretelli	Comedy	
The Extraordinary Adventures of Mr. West in the Land of the Bolsheviks	Необычайные Прикючения Мистера Веста в Стране Большевиков	Lev Kuleshov	Porfori Podobed, Boris Barnet	Comedy, Propaganda	First explicitly Anti-American film
The Golubin Manor	Особняк Голубиных	Vladimir Gardin	Alexandra Kartseva, Georgy Bobynin, Nina Li	Drama	
Maiden's Tower	Легенда о Девичьей башне	Vladimir Ballyuzek	Sofia Jozeffi, Vahram Papazyan, Ismayil Hidayatzada	Drama	
The Palace and the Fortress	Дворец и крепость	Aleksandr Ivanovsky	Yevgeni Boronikhin	Biopic, history, drama	
Red Partisans	Красные партизаны	Vyacheslav Viskovsky	Nikolay Dirin, Mikhail Lomakin, Nikolai Simonov, Valeri Solovtsov	War film	
The Red Web	Красный газ	Ivan Kalabukhov	Sergei Bartenev, Mikhail Lenin, Sergei Troitsky	War film	Lost film
Three Lives	Три жизни	Ivan Perestiani	Nato Vachnadze, Mikheil Gelovani, Dimitri Kipiani	Adventure	

== See also ==
- 1924 in the Soviet Union
