= List of Soviet films of 1922 =

A list of films produced in the Soviet Union in 1922 (see 1922 in film).

== 1922 ==
Title	Original title	Director	Cast	Genre	Notes
The Exile	Modzgvari (Изгнанник)	Vladimir Barsky	Shalva Dadiani, Giorgi Davitashvili, Yelena Charskaya	Drama	
History of the Civil War	История Гражданской войны	Dziga Vertov		Documentary	
Infinite Sorrow	Скорбь бесконечная	Aleksandr Panteleyev	Pyotr Kirillov, Ursula Krug, Vladimir Maksimov	Drama	
In the Whirlwind of Revolution	В вихре революции	Aleksandr Chargonin	Zoya Barantsevich	Drama	
Kino-Pravda (vol. 1–13)	Кино-правда	Dziga Vertov		Newsreel	
The Miracle Maker	Чудотворец	Aleksandr Panteleyev	Pyotr Kirillov, Yelena Tumanskaya	Comedy	
Polikushka	Поликушка	Alexander Sanin	Ivan Moskvin, Vera Pashennaya	Drama	filmed in 1919
The Suram Fortress	Suramis tsikhe (Сурамская крепость	Ivan Perestiani	Hamo Beknazarian, Mikheil Chiaureli	Adventure	

== See also ==
- 1922 in the Soviet Union
