= Who Is to Blame? (disambiguation) =

Who is to Blame? may refer to:

- Who Is to Blame?, an 1846 novel by Alexander Herzen
- Who Is to Blame?, a 1918 film by Frank Borzage
- Who Is the Guilty?, a 1925 Georgian silent film by Alexandre Tsutsunava
- Who Is To Blame?, a 2009 computer utility
