= Notary in Georgia =

Notary Chamber of Georgia

In Georgia a notary extends state authority by means of notary and other associated acts. A document attested by the notary has indisputable probative force. 224 notaries practice in Georgia. The Minister of Justice directed that the number of notaries should not exceed 300. All practicing notaries in Georgia are registered in the Notary Chamber of Georgia.

== History ==
Under the USSR, a notary was a state official. Since 1996, based on the Georgian Law, "About Notary" notaries' status as a private profession was determined.

Since 2009, notarizations are registered in the electronic registry.

Legislation defining a notary's professional responsibility, has operated since 2010.

Order No. 3 of the Minister of Justice, "About the rule of conducting a contest for selection the notary candidates" was approved on January 10, 2012. It specifies required qualifications.

== Responsibilities ==
It guarantees citizen's immunity from misdeeds by a notary. Damage caused by culpable or careless acts of notaries is remunerated by the insurer. A notary is required to keep confidential any information revealed to it in association with its profession. This obligation survives after the notary exits the position. Inheritance certificates are available from any notary. Online notarization became available. Notarized deeds can be inspected at the website of the Notary Chamber. Control over official activities of notaries is performed by the Ministry of Justice.

== Qualifications ==
Notaries must be capable Georgian citizens with higher legal education, having passed relevant traineeship or at least one year of notary service or at least 5 years of service in public bodies. Notaries must pass the qualification examination.

== Sources ==
- Georgia Law, "About Notary"
- official website of the notary Chamber of Georgia
