= Natia =

Natia (Georgian: ნათია) is a feminine Georgian given name, a diminutive of Natela and ultimately derived from the word nateli (ნათელი), meaning "light, bright". According to the Public Service Hall, it is among the top 10 most common Georgian given names for females. Notable people with the given name include:

- Natia Danelia (born 2003), Georgian footballer
- Natia Janjgava (born 1972), Georgian chess player
- Natia Pantsulaia (born 1991), Ukrainian footballer
- Natia Skhirtladze (born 1990), Georgian football defender
- Natia Todua (born 1996), Georgian-German singer

== See also ==
- Natias Neutert (born 1941), German artist, author, poet, orator and translator
