= Chess of Life =

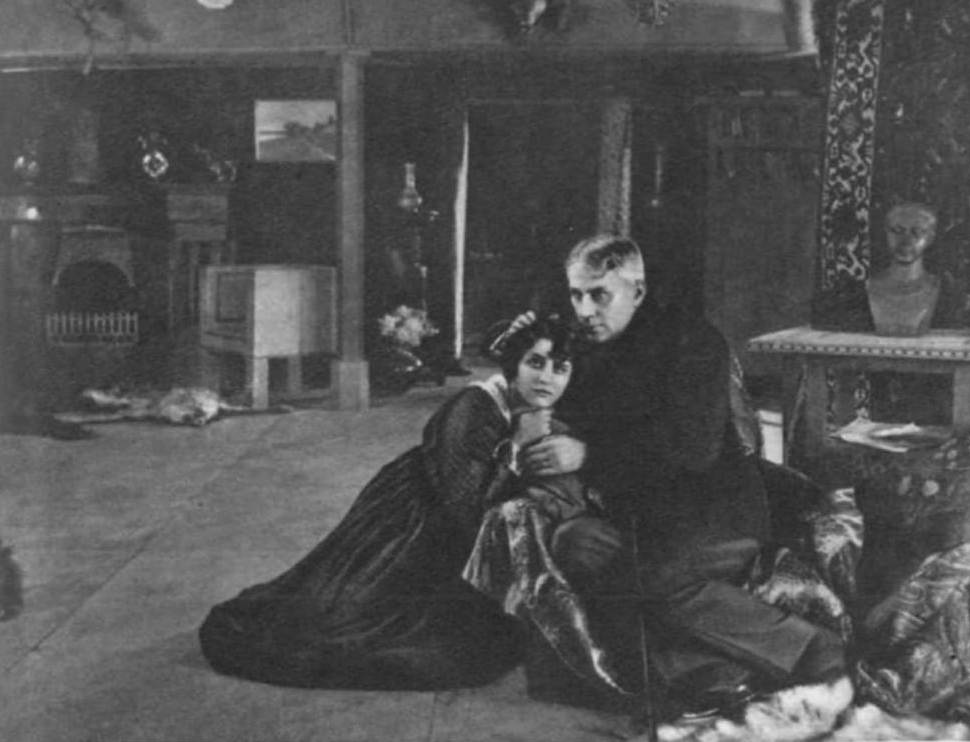
- A scene from Chess of Life with Vera Kholodnaya and Ivan Perestiani
- Russian: Шахматы жизни
- Directed by: Aleksandr Nikolayevich Uralsky
- Produced by: Ermolieff's film company
- Starring: Vera Kholodnaya; Ivan Perestiani; Nikolai Tseretelli
- Release date: November 5, 1916
- Country: Russian Empire
- Language: Russian

Chess of Life (Russian: Шахматы жизни) is a lost 1916 Russian silent film directed by Aleksandr Uralsky. It is based on the novel Checkmate by Anna Mar.

== Plot ==
The film tells about the moral transformation of a demimonde woman (perceived as a "fallen woman" by the high society) under the influence of a pure and sincere feeling of love, while, on the contrary, the surrounding beau monde people are shown as immoral hypocrites.

== Starring ==
- Vera Kholodnaya as Inna
- Ivan Perestiani as baron Koehring
- Nikolai Tseretelli as Mark Rudnetsky
- Nonna Leshchinskaya as Rudnetsky's wife

== Reception ==
The film received positive reviews from film critics of the time.
