= The Legend of Suram Fortress =

- Directed by: Dodo Abashidze; Sergei Parajanov
- Screenplay by: Vaja Gigashvili
- Based on: Suramis Tsikhe by Daniel Chonkadze
- Produced by: Gruziya-film
- Starring: Leila Alibegashvili; Zurab Kipshidze; Dodo Abashidze; Sofiko Chiaureli; Levan Uchaneishvili
- Cinematography: Yuri Klimenko
- Edited by: Kora Tsereteli
- Music by: Jansug Kakhidze
- Production company: Kartuli Pilmi
- Release date: July 1985 (Moscow International Film Festival)
- Running time: 88 min.
- Country: Soviet Union
- Languages: Georgian, Russian

The Legend of Suram Fortress (Georgian: ამბავი სურამის ციხისა, romanized: ambavi suramis tsikhisa) is a 1985 Soviet art film directed by Georgian director Sergei Parajanov and Georgian actor Dodo Abashidze. Sergei Parajanov's first film after 15 years of censorship in the Soviet Union, it is a film stylistically linked with his earlier The Color of Pomegranates (1968): The film consists of a series of tableaux; once again minimal dialogue is used; the film abounds in surreal, almost oneiric power.

== Plot ==
The story is a retelling of a well-known Georgian folk-tale brought into written literature by the 19th-century writer Daniel Chonkadze.

Durmishkhan is a serf freed by his master. Now, he has to buy the freedom of his lover Vardo to marry her. He leaves his land and encounters a merchant named Osman Agha who tells his story. He was born a serf named Nodar Zalikashvili. After he had lost his mother due to his master's cruelty, he killed his master, fled, and embraced Islam to avoid persecution. Durmishkhan now starts to work for Osman Agha and marries another woman, who gives birth to a boy named Zurab. Meanwhile, Vardo becomes a fortune teller. Osman Agha leaves his trade to Durmishkhan and converts to Christianity. In a dream a group of Muslims kill him for being a murtad.

Zurab grows up and starts to work with his father. Durmishkhan, having converted to Islam, has become a stranger to his land and people. Georgia comes under the threat of Muslim invaders and the king gives orders to bolster all fortresses in the country. However, Suram Fortress continues to crumble. Durmishkhan returns to Muslim territory. King's men come to Vardo the fortune teller to have her solve the mystery of Suram Fortress. Vardo tells that a blue-eyed young man of the country must be bricked up alive in order for the fortress to stand. Zurab sacrifices himself to save his country and its Christian faith.

== Cast ==
- Leila Alibegashvili as Young Vardo
- Zurab Kipshidze as Durmishkhan
- Dodo Abashidze as Osman Agha / piper
- Sofiko Chiaureli as Old Vardo
- Levan Uchaneishvili as Zurab
- Veriko Anjaparidze as old fortune teller
- Vadim Spiridonov as narrator

== Awards ==
- 1986: Sitges - Catalan International Film Festival — Caixa de Catalunya Award
- 1987: Rotterdam International Film Festival — Rotterdam Award
- 1987: São Paulo International Film Festival — Critics Award

== Cultural references ==
Black metal band Voidcraeft used clips from the film for their song The Vertical Mammal.

== See also ==
- The Suram Fortress
