= Olga Forsh =

Russian/Soviet novelist, dramatist, memoirist and scenarist

- Portrait by Alexei Mozhaev
- Born: May 28, 1873; Ghunib, Daghestan
- Died: July 17, 1961 (aged 88); Leningrad, Soviet Union

Olga Dmitryevna Forsh (Russian: О́льга Дми́триевна Форш, Oljga Dmitrijevna Forš), née Komarova (Russian: Комаро́ва) (May 28 [O.S. May 16] 1873 – July 17, 1961), was a Russian/Soviet novelist, dramatist, memoirist, and scenarist.

== Early life ==
Forsh was born in the fortress at Ghunib, in Daghestan, the daughter of a major general in the Russian Imperial Army. Her father met her mother, Nina Shakhetdinova, an azerbaijani, while he was stationed in the Caucasus. Nina died when Olga was very young. Olga's stepmother, who was also her former nurse, showed little interest in her, especially after the birth of her own daughter by Olga's father. When her father, Major General Komarov, died in 1881 Olga was placed in an orphanage for children of the nobility.

She married Boris Eduardovich Forsh, who had also been born into the family of a high-ranking military officer, in 1895. In the 1890s she studied at various art schools, most importantly in Kyiv and St Petersburg, where she worked in the studio of Pavel Chistyakov.

In 1904 Boris Forsh resigned from the military in objection to his having to serve at the executions of political prisoners. He was deprived of his salary, and he and Olga moved to a farm in Ukraine with their two children. Olga was also pregnant at the time. She later attributed the inspiration for her early stories to this extended period of living among the peasantry. Her first works of fiction were published in 1907. She continued drawing and painting, and worked as an art teacher at the Levitskaya School in Tsarskoye Selo in 1910-11, but she turned toward writing as time went by.

== Career ==
Olga was interested in the fashionable ideas of the time, including Tolstoyanism, Theosophy and Buddhism, but was increasingly drawn to Socialism. After the Russian Revolution of 1917 Olga and her husband became active supporters of the Bolsheviks. Olga's husband died of typhus while serving with the Red Army in Kyiv. After his death she continued to dedicate herself to cultural work.

She devoted several novels to the history of revolutionary thought and the revolutionary movement in Russia. Among them are Palace and Prison (1924–25, also made into the film The Palace and the Fortress), about the revolutionary Mikhail Stepanovich Beideman, The Fervid Workshop (1926), about the Revolution of 1905–07, and Pioneers of Freedom (1950–53), which deals with the Decembrists. She also wrote the three-part biographical novel Radishchev, which comprises the books Jacobin Leaven (1932), The Landlady of Kazan (1934–35), and The Pernicious Book (1939). Her experimental play The Substitute Lecturer was published in 1930.

The fate of the creative individual under an oppressive regime is treated in the novel The Contemporaries (1926), which is about Nikolay Gogol and A. A. Ivanov. In the novels The Lunatic Ship (1931) and The Raven (originally titled The Symbolists, 1933), Olga portrayed life among the St Petersburg artistic intelligentsia in the early 20th century and the first post revolutionary years and created portraits of such contemporaries as Maxim Gorky, Alexander Blok and Fyodor Sologub.

== Later life ==
Olga rose to prominence in the arena of Soviet literature, playing important roles at the 1934 Congress of Writers, and at the 1954 Congress, where she gave the opening address. She was awarded the Order of the Red Banner of Labour (twice) and the Order of the Badge of Honour.

She died in Tyarlova, a suburb of Leningrad, in 1961. She was buried in the Kazan Cemetery, on the outskirts of Pushkin.

== English translations ==
- Palace and Prison, (novel), Foreign Languages Publishing House, Moscow. from Archive.org
- Dolls of Paris, (story), from Great Soviet Short Stories, Dell, 1990.
- The Substitute Lecturer (one-act play), from An Anthology of Russian Women's Writing, Oxford, 1994.
- Pioneers of Freedom, (novel), University Press of the Pacific, 2003.
