= Eliso =

1928 film

- Directed by: Nikoloz Shengelaia
- Written by: Aleksandre Kazbegi (novel); Nikoloz Shengelaia; Sergei Tretyakov
- Cinematography: Vladimer Kereselidze
- Music by: Iona Tuskia
- Production company: Sovkino
- Release date: 23 October 1928
- Running time: 90 minutes
- Country: Soviet Union
- Languages: Silent; Georgian and Russian intertitles

Eliso is a 1928 Soviet silent adventure film directed by Nikoloz Shengelaia and loosely based on the short story by Alexander Kazbegi. It was made in the Georgian Soviet Socialist Republic.

It was released in the United States in 1929 by Amkino under the alternative title of Caucasian Love.

== Plot ==
The film is set in the 19th century. To consolidate its power in the Caucasus region, the Russian government intends to evict the Chechens from the Russian Empire. A cossack Ataman fraudulently obtains signatures from illiterate residents for a petition which calls for resettlement to Turkey, by disguising it as a request for permission to stay on their land to the governor-general of Muslims of the Verdi mountain aul. The daughter of the village elders, Eliso falls in love with Khevsurian Vajia, who is a Christian. He is seeking the abolition of the decree to expel Chechens, but his heroic efforts to save the village are futile. Residents have already been banished from their homes and leave the village. Vajia as a kafir has no right to leave with them out of their homes. Eliso can not accept the fate of an outlaw, she sneaks at night into the village, which is already inhabited by the Cossacks, and sets fire to it.

== Cast ==
- Aleksandre Imedashvili as Astamur
- Kokhta Karalashvili as Vajia
- Kira Andronikashvili as Eliso
- I. Mamporya as Seidulla
- Tsetsilia Tsutsunava as Zazubika
- Aleksandre Jorjoliani as General
- K. Gurianov as Billeting officer
- I. Galkin as Village constable
- Marika Chimishkian as Muslimati

== Reception ==
Sergei Eisenstein expressed to Ivor Montagu that there were only two good portrayals of the lezginka in film, and that Shengelaya's in Eliso was better than in October: Ten Days That Shook the World, the film he directed. In a 2012 poll of film critics by Tbilisi Intermedia, Eliso was listed first among the 12 best films of Georgian cinema.

== Bibliography ==
- Christie, Ian & Taylor, Richard. The Film Factory: Russian and Soviet Cinema in Documents 1896-1939. Routledge, 2012.
