= The Case of Tariel Mklavadze =

1925 film

- Directed by: Ivane Perestiani
- Written by: Shalva Dadiani; Egnate Ninoshvili (novel)
- Starring: Kote Mikaberidze; Nato Vachnadze; Mikheil Kadagidze; Dimitri Kipiani
- Cinematography: Aleksandre Digmelovi
- Production company: Sakhkinmretsvi
- Release date: March 17, 1925 (Soviet Union)
- Running time: 70 minutes
- Country: Soviet Union
- Languages: Silent; Georgian/Russian intertitles

The Case of Tariel Mklavadze (Georgian: ტარიელ მკლავაძის მკვლელობის საქმე) is a 1925 Soviet silent horror film directed by Ivane Perestiani.

== Plot ==
Schoolteacher Spiridon Mtsirishvili (Kote Mikaberidze) and his wife Despine (Nato Vachnadze) rent a room at a small inn. Tariel Mklavadze (Mikheil Kadagidze), a local nobleman becomes smitten by Despine, resolving to have her by any means necessary. With the help of his comrades, Tariel begins a series of encounters aimed at terrifying the young couple, all the while attempting to kidnap Despine.

== Cast ==
- Kote Mikaberidze as Spiridon Mtsirishvili
- Nato Vachnadze as Despine
- Mikheil Kadagidze as Tariel Mklavadze
- Dimitri Kipiani

== Production ==
The Case of the Murder of Tariel Mklavadze was directed by Perestiani.

== Bibliography ==
- Rollberg, Peter (7 November 2008). Historical Dictionary of Russian and Soviet Cinema. Scarecrow Press. ISBN 978-0-8108-6268-5.
