= The Exile (1922 film) =

1922 film

- Directed by: Vladimir Barsky
- Written by: Shalva Dadiani
- Based on: Preceptor novel by Alexander Kazbegi
- Starring: Shalva Dadiani
- Cinematography: Aleksandre Digmelovi
- Production company: Gruziya-film
- Release date: 1 September 1922
- Running time: 54 minutes
- Countries: Soviet Union (Georgian SSR)
- Language: Silent film

The Exile (Georgian: მოძღვარი, Russian: Изгнанник) is a 1922 Soviet Georgian romantic drama film directed by Vladimir Barsky, based on the novel by Alexander Kazbegi.

== Plot ==
The film tells the story of Makvala, a shepherdess who is forced into marriage with Bok'aul Gela but cannot forget her love for Onise. She escapes from her husband, but according to the laws of the community, she is brought back to her family. Gela tracks down Onise and stabs him. The community condemns all three to death and expels them from the village. In the snow, Makvala is found by her priest, Onofre, who takes her in and cares for her. Soon, Makvala is found dead, and the crime is blamed on the priest, who is exiled. Onise confesses to the community that he preferred killing Makvala to letting her go. Gela kills his wife’s murderer with a dagger. The community kills Gela and reopens the case. The priest is acquitted, but the papers granting his release do not reach him before he dies in exile.

== Cast ==
- Shalva Dadiani - Preceptor
- Giorgi Davitashvili - Onise
- Yelena Charskaya - Djatia
- M. Alibegova - Makvala
- Valerian Gunia - Father of Makvala
- Margarita Barskaya - Mother of Makvala
- Aleksandre Imedashvili - Gela, husband of Makvala
- Iuza Zardalashvili
