= The Patricide =

1882 novel by Alexander Kazbegi

- Author: Alexander Kazbegi
- Original title: მამის მკვლელი
- Language: Georgian
- Genre: Social novel Literary realism
- Publication date: 1882
- Publication place: Georgia
- Media type: Print (hardback)
- Pages: 200 pages

The Patricide (Georgian: მამის მკვლელი) is a novel by Alexander Kazbegi, first published in 1882. The novel is a love story, but it also addresses many socio-political issues of 19th-century Georgia. The novel portrays critical realism of the 19th century.

== Plot summary ==
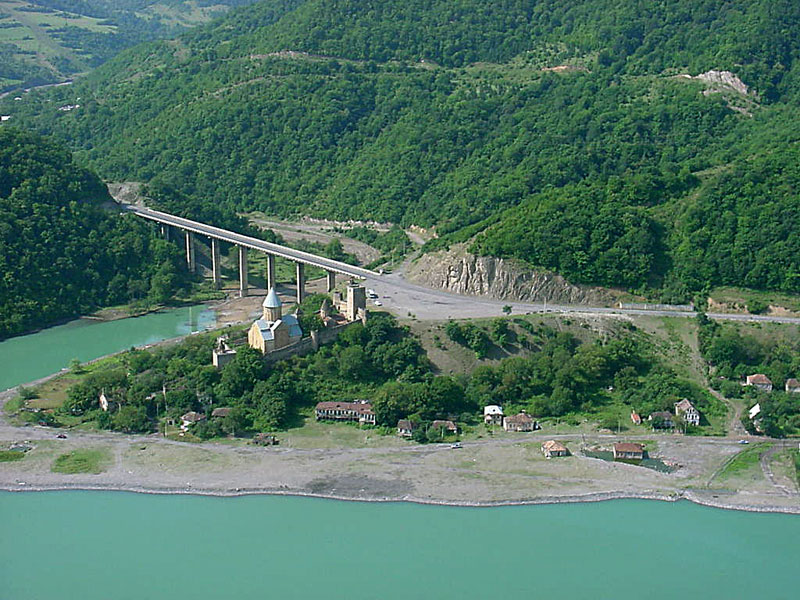
Ananuri Church and fortress

The novel takes place in 19th-century Georgia, when it was occupied by the Russian Empire. It is the love story of Iago, a peasant boy, and Nunu, a beautiful young woman. Nunu's mother died early, and since her father (a member of the coalition army in the Shamil rebellion) is too poor to care for her, she lives with her uncle's family. They disapprove of her match with Iago, as they consider him a mere Plebe. Instead, they are sympathetic towards Grigola, the tyrannical village governor appointed by the Russians. Grigola is married, but in love with the beautiful Nunu. He convinces her family that his brother would like to wed her, though Grigola intends to keep Nunu as his own mistress.

To get Nunu, Grigola realizes that he has to get rid of Iago first. Grigola accuses him of stealing state property and gives orders to lock him up in the Ananuri fortress. He then kidnaps and rapes Nunu. Koba, Iago's best friend, witnesses the kidnapping. He fights through Grigola's men to rescue Nunu, but he is too late. Koba swears revenge against Grigola for his shameful behavior.

Koba and another friend break Iago out of jail, and they all decide to flee to the Northern Caucasus. They first find refuge across the mountain pass in the village of "Arzia" in Ingushetia, where a local named Parcho shelters them while a healer tends to Iago's wounds. Afterward, they move on to hide in Chechnya, since Russian police and Cossacks are looking for them. Despite the fact that many Georgians were fighting on the Russian side, Shamil receives them and offers protection. The author portrays Chechens as free men who fight for their freedom, in contrast to the Georgians, who were kept on a short leash by people like Grigola, unable even to hold town meetings (a tradition since the Middle Ages).

Meanwhile, Nunu escapes from Grigola. Koba manages to contact her and tells her to meet them in Vladikavkaz in North Ossetia, along with her father. The night before Iago and Nunu are supposed to see each other again, Iago and Koba's host decides to inform Grigola of their whereabouts, hoping to receive their horses in exchange for the information. After midnight, Grigola shows up and murders Iago, the friend, and Nunu's father, hoping to pin the latter on Nunu and thus have an excuse to send her to Siberia. Koba escapes Grigola's wrath, but upon discovering both her lover and father murdered, Nunu dies from grief.

At the end of the story, Koba exacts his revenge for both Iago and Nunu by shooting Grigola and his supervisor in a cab in the forest. Koba is the hero of the story, who respects friendship, defends truth, respects women, and enforces justice.

== Legacy ==
The Koba character was used as a pseudonym by Joseph Stalin, who was born in Georgia. A friend of Stalin recalls "Koba became Soso's [Stalin's] God and gave his life meaning. He wished to become Koba. He called himself 'Koba' and insisted we call him that. His face shone with pride and pleasure when we called him 'Koba'".

Koba's vengeful characteristics, embodiment of traditional Georgian knightly ideals, and his simplistic moral code of honesty and loyalty appealed to Stalin.

The traitorous antagonist of reboot series of the Planet of the Apes bears the name "Koba," a possible reference to Joseph Stalin and his love of the character.
