= Who Is the Guilty? =

1925 film

Who is the Guilty?
- Directed by: Alexandre Tsutsunava
- Written by: Alexandre Tsutsunava
- Starring: Kote Mikaberidze; Tsetsilia Tsutsunava; Nato Vachnadze; Dimitri Kipiani
- Cinematography: Sergei Zabozlayev
- Distributed by: Sakhkinmretsvi
- Release date: 25 December 1925 (Soviet Union)
- Running time: 105 minutes
- Country: Soviet Union (Georgian SSR)
- Language: Georgian

Who is the Guilty? (Georgian: ვინ არის დამნაშავე?, Russian: Наездник из Вайлд Вест, sometimes Who is to Blame?) is a 1925 Georgian silent film directed by Alexandre Tsutsunava

== Plot ==
Young farmer Siko wants to start a better life by working for an American circus. His family stays behind, but after he leaves his child dies.

== Cast ==
- Kote Mikaberidze as Siko
- Tsetsilia Tsutsunava as Salikhe
- Nato Vachnadze as Pati
- Dimitri Kipiani as Besya
