= Vaja Gigashvili =

Georgian writer and playwright

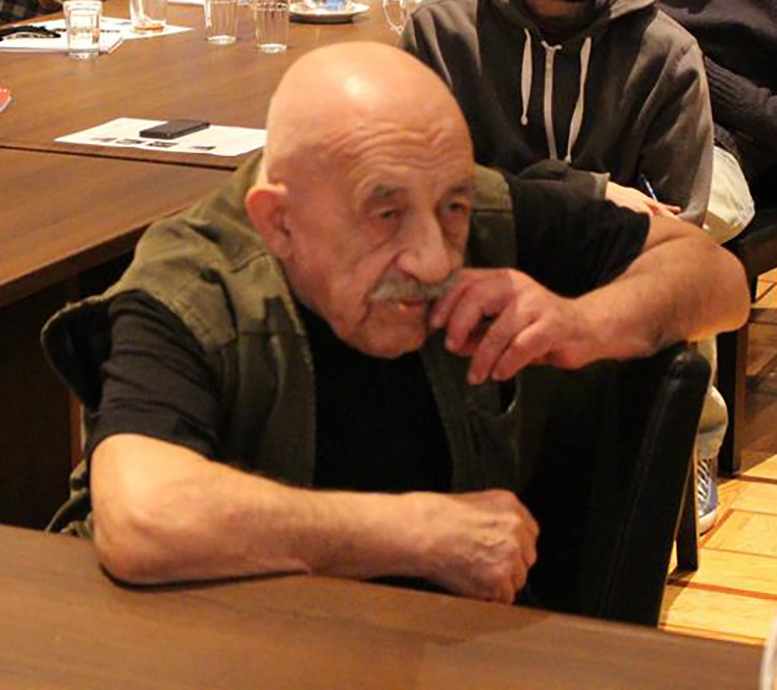
- Gigashvili in 2015
- Born: Vaja Gigashvili; October 15, 1936; Tbilisi, Georgia
- Died: December 31, 2017 (aged 81); Tbilisi
- Occupations: novelist, short story writer, screenwriter, translator
- Writing career
- Genres: short story, novel, screenplay
- Notable works: Stories from a Poet Who Seldom Wrote Poems, (2017)
- Literary movement: modernism
- Website: armuri.georgianforum.com/t479-topic

Vaja Gigashvili (IPA: [vaʒa ɡiɡaʃʷili]; Georgian: ვაჟა გიგაშვილი; (October 15, 1936 — December 31, 2017) was a Georgian writer and playwright.

== Biography ==
Gigashvili graduated in 1961 from Georgian Technical University, Faculty of Architecture, Urban Planning and Design. Afterwards, he worked as an architect, published several Georgian stories, novels, and translated stories of Thomas Pynchon. Also he is screenwriter award-winning movie The Legend of Suram Fortress. Some of his works have been translated into English, French and Russian.

His main works are Stories from a Poet Who Seldom Wrote Poems, 2017.

== Works ==
=== Books ===
- Stories from a Poet Who Seldom Wrote Poems, Tbilisi, Intelekti Publishing, 2017
- Day and Time 1956-1966, Tbilisi, Intelekti Publishing, 2017
- One Person Kaplanishvili, Tbilisi, Palitra L publishing, 2010
- Warm bed and cold night, Tbilisi, Merani publishing, 2006
- Hunting in Chong-Tash, Tbilisi, Nakaduli publishing, 1976

== Literary prizes and awards ==
- Saguramo literary prize, 2009
- Gold Medal of Pen Club, 2015
