= Nato Vachnadze =

Georgian actress

Nato Vachnadze ნატო ვაჩნაძე
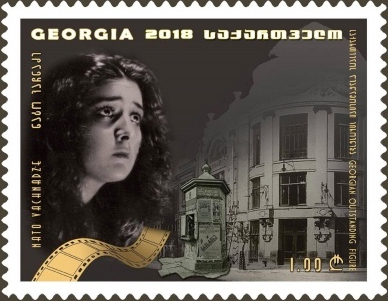
- Vachnadze on a 2018 stamp of Georgia
- Born: Nato Andronikashvili; 14 June 1904; Warsaw, Poland
- Died: 14 June 1953 (aged 49)
- Occupation: Actress
- Years active: 1923–1953
- Spouses: Merab Vachnadze; Nikoloz Shengelaia; Anatoli Kacharava

Natalia "Nato" Vachnadze (Georgian: ნატო ვაჩნაძე), born Natalia Andronikashvili (Georgian: ნატო ანდრონიკაშვილი)^{[A]}, (14 June 1904 – 14 June 1953) was a Georgian and Soviet film actress. She started her career in the silent film era, usually playing the screen character of an Ingénue, an innocent and passionate young woman. She continued to work as an actress during the sound era until her death in a plane crash in 1953. One of the first film stars of the Soviet Union she received numerous honors, including the title of People's Artist of the Georgian SSR and the Stalin Prize.

== Biography ==
Nato Vachnadze was born in Warsaw, then in the Russian Empire as the daughter of a Georgian father George Andronikov from the Andronikashvili family and a Polish mother Ekaterina Slivitskaya. Her father, an officer in the Russian army, was killed in a skirmish with a band of Chechen outlaws (abrek) in 1912. She adopted her last name from her first marriage to Merab Vachnadze, with whom she had a son, Tengiz Vachnadze (born 1926), the future architect. Her second marriage was with the film director Nikoloz Shengelaia, with whom she had two sons, the film directors Giorgi Shengelaia and Eldar Shengelaia. Her third marriage was with the Soviet navy captain Anatoli Kacharava (1910–1982). Nato Vachnadze's younger sister, Kira (1908–1960), also became an actress and married the writer Boris Pilnyak.

Although several versions of her discovery for the film exist, the most popular and likely is that the film director Shakro Berishvili noticed her photography in a photo studio in Tbilisi. He managed to find her in Kakheti and convinced to play in her first film, the 1923 adventure film Arsen the Bandit. The role of Nunu in the 1923 film Patricide and the role of Esma in the 1924 film Three Lives made her famous not only in the Georgian Union Republic, but all over the Soviet Union. In these films her screen character was that of an Ingénue, an innocent and passionate young woman. The theater and film director Kote Marjanishvili gave Vachnadze two challenging roles in the experimental films The Gadfly and Amok adapted from novels by Ethel Voynich and Stefan Zweig. By now not only a national, but also an international star she played the gypsy woman Masha in the German-Soviet film The Living Corpse, adapted from the Leo Tolstoy play The Living Corpse.

Vachnadze was – together with her male colleague Igor Ilyinsky – one of the first film stars of the young Soviet Union, and was sometimes called the Soviet Vera Kholodnaya, after the first film star of the Russian empire, Vera Kholodnaya. Indicators for her stardom are the appearance of her name in film advertisements and the publication of two pulp biographies printed in nearly 100,000 copies. Her screen character was decidedly different from the screen characters of other actresses. Most Soviet actresses in the 1920s were relegated to playing either the role of a traditional or proletarian heroine. Vachnadze in contrast played glamorous women with private lives – presumably her exotic Georgian origin allowed her more freedoms on the screen than a Russian actress would have had. Unusual for Soviet cinema most of her films were steamy melodramas in which she acted with considerable passion and emotion. Yevgenia Ginzburg described her as a "dovelike heroine" and as "an eternal victim" in his memoirs. The writer Viktor Shklovsky described her as "an artiste of the American type because her value lies in the purity of her ethnographic type".

With the emergence of the sound film Vachnadze decided to have a time out. Following a recommendation by Grigori Kozintsev she went to Moscow where she worked for Esfir Shub as an assistant director. She then returned to Georgia, restarting her career in some of the earliest Georgian sound films such as the 1934 film The Last Crusaders and Mikheil Chiaureli's The Last Masquerade. She also played in films of her second husband, Nikoloz Shengelaia, including the silent film Giuli and The Golden Valley. Her last film was the 1952 film Conquerors of the Peaks directed by Davit Rondeli.

As the first star of Georgian and Soviet cinema she was both named a People's Artist of the Georgian Soviet Socialist Republic and was awarded a Stalin Prize in 1941. She was named an Honored Artist of the Russian Soviet Federative Socialist Republic and received three Orders of the Red Banner of Labour. In 1943 she also became a member of the Communist Party of the Soviet Union. Vachnadze died in a plane crash in 1953. Shortly before her death the poet and writer Boris Pasternak addressed her during a visit to his country house. He said about Nato Vachnadze "Your beauty evokes a desire [in us] to kneel down before you!".

After her death she received several honors. A street in Tbilisi and a product tanker of the Georgian Shipping Company was named after her from 1985 to 1995. The Georgian film award is named Nato in her honor. In 1981 the Nato Vachnadze House Museum opened on the family estate in Gurjaani, Kakheti.

== Filmography ==
Year	English Title	Georgian Title	Russian Title	Role	Director
1923	Arsen the Bandit	არსენა ყაჩაღი	Разбойник Арсен	Neno	Vladimir Barsky
1923	Patricide	მამის მკვლელი	У позорного столба	Nunu	Hamo Beknazarian
1924	Three Lives	სამი სიცოცხლე	Три жизни	Esma	Ivan Perestiani
1925	The Case of Tariel Mklavadze	ტარიელ მკლავაძის მკვლელობის საქმე	Герой нашего времени	Despine	Ivan Perestiani
1925	Who is the Guilty?	ვინ არის დამნაშავე?	Наездник из Вайлд Вест	Pati	Alexandre Tsutsunava
1925	Horrors of the Past 2	ათასის ფასად			Vladimir Barsky
1926	The Gadfly	კრაზანა	Овод	Jema	Kote Marjanishvili
1926	Natela	ნათელა	Натела	Natela	Hamo Beknazarian
1927	Amok	ამოკი	Амок, закон и долг	Woman	Kote Marjanishvili
1927	Giuli	გიული	Гиули	Guili	Nikoloz Shengelaia
1928	The Living Corpse		Живой труп	Masha	Fedor Otsep
1930	Suburban Quarters		Кварталы предместья	Dora	Grigori Gritscher-Tcherikover
1931	Iron Brigade		Железная бригада	Masha	Dmitri Vasilyev
1934	The Last Crusaders	უკანასკნელი ჯვაროსნები	Последние крестоносцы	Tsitsya	Siko Dolidze
1934	The Last Masquerade	უკანასკნელი მასკარადი	Последний маскарад	Tamari	Mikheil Chiaureli
1937	The Golden Valley	ნარინჯის ველი	Золотистая долина	Nani	Nikoloz Shengelaia
1937	Arsena	არსენა	Арсен	Neno	Mikheil Chiaureli
1939	Girl from Khidobani	ქალიშვილი ხიდობნიდან	Девушка из Хидобани	Gviristine	Diomide Antadze
1940	Motherland	სამშობლო	Родина	Natela	Diomide Antadze and Nikoloz Shengelaia
1941	Qadjana	ქაჯანა	Каджана	Marta	Konstantine Pipinashvili
1943	He will come back	ის კიდევ დაბრუნდება	Он еще вернется	Manana	Diomide Antadze and Nikoloz Shengelaia
1947	A Cradle for Akaki	აკაკის აკვანი	Колыбель поэта	Mano	Konstantine Pipinashvili
1948	Keto and Kote	ქეთო და კოტე	Кето и Котэ	Dancing in the last scene	Vakhtang Tabliashvili and Shalva Gedevanishvili
1952	Conquerors of the Peaks	მწვერვალთა დამპყრობნი	Покорители вершин	Elisabed Lomidze	Davit Rondeli

== Notes ==
^{[A]} In Russian sources also Natalya Georgievna Andronikasvhili (Russian: Наталья Георгиевна Андроникашвили).
