= Julian Dziedzina =

Julian Dziedzina (21 October 1930, Lesko, Poland – 21 May 2007, Łódź) was a Polish director, film critic, and a longtime lecturer at the National Film School in Łódź.

== Life ==
In 1956, he graduated from the Directing Department at the National Film School in Łódź. He started a puppet theater and amateur stage in Wałbrzych. He was also a film critic. As a director he made his debut with the film Koniec nocy, starring, among others, Zbigniew Cybulski and Roman Polański.

His most famous work was Bokser, with Daniel Olbrychski in the lead role. The film Field received three awards at the International Film Festival for Youth in Venice.

Dziedzina was buried in the Starym cemetery in Łódź.

== Filmography ==
=== Feature films ===
- Koniec nocy (1956) – director, screenwriter
- Eroica (1957) – castmember
- Zagubione uczucia (1957) – cooperating director, screenwriter
- Miasteczko (1958) – director, screenwriter
- Decyzja (1960) – director
- Mam tu swój dom (1963) – director
- Rachunek sumienia (1964) – director, screenwriter
- Święta wojna (1965) – director
- Bokser (1966) – director
- Ortalionowy dziadek (1968) – director
- Otello z M-2 (1968) – director
- Czekam w Monte-Carlo (1969) – director
- Kryształ (1971) – director
- Mały (1970) – director
- Portfel (1970) – director
- Trochę nadziei (1971) – director
- Wizyta (1971) – director
- Bitva o Hedviku (1972) – director
- Na niebie i na ziemi (1973) – director
- Czerwone ciernie (1976) – director, screenwriter
- Umarli rzucają cień (1978) – director, screenwriter
- Tajemnica starego ogrodu (1983) – director, screenwriter

=== TV series ===
- Ucieczka z miejsc ukochanych (1987) – director, screenwriter
- Dziewczyna z Mazur (1990) – director
- W piątą stronę świata (1990) – director, screenwriter
