= Natella =

Natela or Natella (Georgian: ნათელა; Cyrillic: Нателла) is a Georgian feminine given name, derived from the word nateli (ნათელი), meaning "light, bright". According to the Public Service Hall, it is among the top ten most common Georgian given names for females. Notable people with the given name include:

- Natella Akaba (born 1945), Abkhazian historian and politician
- Natella Boltyanskaya (born 1965), Russian journalist, singer-songwriter, poet and radio host
- Natela Dzalamidze (born 1993), Russian-Georgian tennis player
- Natela Iankoshvili (1918–2008), Georgian painter
- Natella Krapivina (born 1982), Ukrainian film producer
- Natella Krasnikova (born 1953), Russian field hockey player
- Natela Nicoli (born 1961), Georgian operatic singer
- Natela Svanidze (1926–2017), Georgian composer
- Natela Turnava (born 1968), Georgian politician

== See also ==
- Natia, a given name and diminutive of Natela
