= The Murder of General Gryaznov =

1921 film

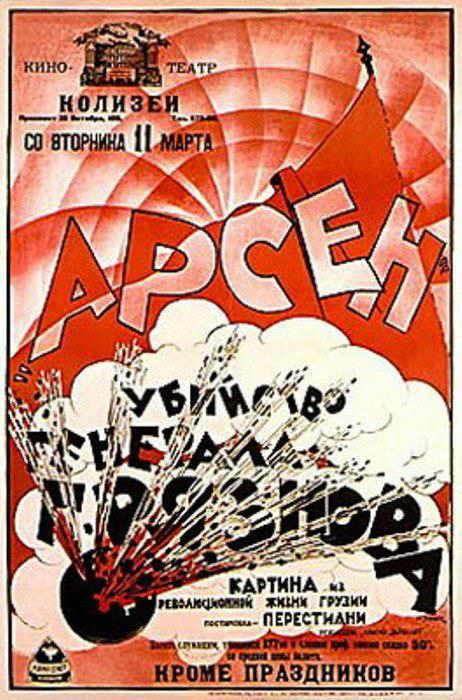
- Directed by: Ivane Perestiani
- Written by: Shalva Dadiani; Ivane Perestiani
- Cinematography: Aleksandre Digmelovi
- Production company: Kinos Seqtsia
- Release date: 1 October 1921
- Country: Soviet Union
- Languages: Silent; Georgian intertitles

The Murder of General Gryaznov (Georgian:Arsena Jorjiashvili) is a 1921 Soviet silent film directed by Ivane Perestiani. It is set during the 1905 uprising in Georgia.

== Plot ==
This historical drama follows Arsena, a revolutionary worker in Tsarist Georgia during the Russo-Japanese War era. Born to a family of peasant farmers, Arsena has become a charismatic leader in the workers' revolutionary movement.

At the factory where he works, he organizes secret meetings with his fellow revolutionaries, unaware that an informant named Pogromski is listening in. Despite maintaining a loving relationship with his family and girlfriend Nino, Arsena is fully committed to the revolutionary struggle.

As worker discontent grows, the Viceroy and his advisors, including the ruthless General Gryaznov and Police Chief Marcinov, plan to crack down on the revolutionaries. Arsena leads a successful strike at the factory, which escalates into riots throughout the city. In response, General Gryaznov proposes evacuating the bourgeoisie and positioning machine guns around the city to suppress any further uprisings.

The authorities intensify their search for revolutionaries, setting up checkpoints throughout the city. Despite the increased security, Arsena continues his revolutionary activities, though his family suffers from hunger during the prolonged strikes. After Pogromski betrays the location of a revolutionary meeting to the police, Arsena narrowly escapes capture while many of his comrades are arrested.

The revolutionary leadership concludes that General Gryaznov, as the "heart and soul of the bourgeois reaction," must be eliminated. They cast lots to determine who will carry out the assassination, and Arsena draws the marked coin. Despite his lover Nino's fears and his own premonitions of death, Arsena remains committed to his mission.

The next day, Arsena throws a grenade at General Gryaznov's carriage, killing him. Although Arsena attempts to escape, he is captured, beaten, and imprisoned. Before his execution, he refuses last rites from a priest and bids farewell to his family and Nino. As Arsena faces the firing squad, Nino finds the determination to continue his revolutionary cause.

In a final act of revolutionary justice, four revolutionaries confront the informant Pogromski and throw him from a bridge into the path of an oncoming train.

== Cast ==
- Mikheil Chiaureli as Arsena
- Ivane Perestiani as Vorontsov-Dashkov
- Alisa Kikodze as Nino
- Nino Dolidze as Sister of Arsena
- Elisabed Cherqezishvili as Mother of Arsena
- N. Yachmenev as General Griaznov
- Ivan Kruchinin as Timofeev
- N. Okudjava as Little girl
- Aleksandre Imedashvili as Labourer-revolutionary
- Kote Mikaberidze as Labourer-revolutionary
- M. Dievsky as Chief of Police
- Valerian Gunia as General
- Vaso Abashidze as General
- Giorgi Ketiladze as Labourer
- D. Pogromski as Secret police agent
- Giorgi Davitashvili

== Bibliography ==
- Georges Sadoul & Peter Morris. Dictionary of Film Makers. University of California Press, 1972.
