= Enemies (1953 film) =

1953 drama film

- Directed by: Tamara Rodionova
- Written by: Maxim Gorky(play)
- Cinematography: Yevgeni Kirpichyov; Aleksandr Sysoyev
- Production company: Lenfilm Studio
- Release date: 1953
- Running time: 158 minutes
- Country: Soviet Union
- Language: Russian

Enemies (Russian: Vragi) is a 1953 Soviet drama film directed by Tamara Rodionova and starring Vasili Sofronov, Elena Granovskaya and Nikolai Korn. It is based on the 1906 play of the same name by Maxim Gorky.

A made-for-TV remake was released in 1974.

== Plot ==
The film is set on the eve of the 1905 Revolution. Tensions rise at the Bardin factory, where workers demand the dismissal of a cruel foreman. The factory director, Bardin's partner Skrobotov, dismisses the workers' demands. In retaliation, the factory owners shut down operations and call in soldiers to suppress dissent. When Skrobotov threatens the workers with a revolver, he is killed, escalating the conflict.

== Cast ==
- Vasili Sofronov as Zakhar Bardin
- Elena Granovskaya
- Nikolai Korn
- Valentina Kibardina
- Nina Olkhina
- Ivan Yefremov
- Vladislav Strzhelchik
- Aleksandr Larikov

== Bibliography ==
- Goble, Alan. The Complete Index to Literary Sources in Film. Walter de Gruyter, 1999.
