= Anna Mar =

Russian screenwriter, novelist, journalist (1887–1917)

- Анна Мар
- Born: Anna Yakovlevna Brovar; February 19, 1887; Saint Petersburg, Russian Empire
- Died: April 1, 1917 (aged 30); Moscow, Russian Empire
- Burial place: Vvedenskoye Cemetery
- Other names: Anna Yakovlevna Lenshina, Printsessa Gryoza; La Princesse Lointaine; Princess Dream
- Occupations: Screenwriter, playwright, novelist, journalist

Anna Mar (1887–1917; née Anna Yakovlevna Brovar, Russian: Анна Мар), who used the pseudonym Printsessa Gryoza ("La Princesse Lointaine", or "Princess Dream"), was a Russian screenwriter, playwright, novelist, and journalist. She was one of the most prolific screenwriters of early Russian cinema and 13 films were made from her scripts between 1914 and 1918.

Her most significant work is the novel Zhenshchina Na Kreste (English: Woman on the Cross; in a censored version, 1916; the full text was published in 1918). From 1914 to 1917, under the pseudonym "Printsessa Gryoza" equivalent to "La Princesse Lointaine" (literally, "Princess Dream"), Mar was in charge of the “Intimate Conversations” section of the Journal for Women. Her constant dialogue with readers supplied Mar with themes for her many screenplays.

She died of suicide on April 1, 1917, in Moscow.
