= The Red Web =

1924 film

- Directed by: Ivan Kalabukhov
- Written by: V. Zazubrin
- Cinematography: M. Izrailson-Naletnyi
- Production company: Goskino
- Release date: 12 December 1924
- Country: Soviet Union
- Languages: Silent; Russian intertitles

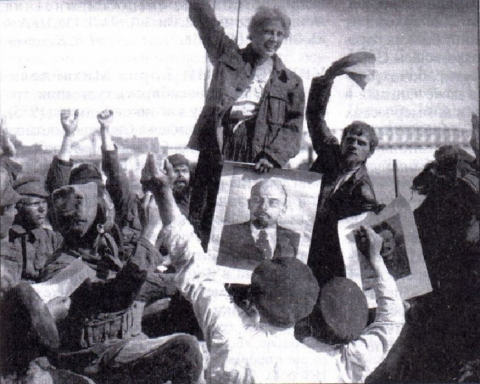
Still from “The Red Web”

The Red Web (Russian: Красный газ, romanized: Krasnyi gas) is a 1924 Soviet silent war film shot in documentary style and directed by Ivan Kalabukhov. The film is based on the book Two Worlds by Vladimir Zazubrin. Sergei Eisenstein helped with the editing of the film. The picture was a success at the box office and was on the big screen for five years. The film is considered lost.

== Plot ==
One of the leaders of the guerrilla underground comes to the Siberian village Pchelino, located in the rear of the frontier of the Kolchak troops. He brings grave news to the old peasant Chepalov that his son, a partisan, died by the hands of the Whites. Chepalov's daughter, Varya, decides to continue the deceased brother's work and asks that an important task be given to her. The girl is entrusted with delivering leaflets to the guerrillas intended for distribution among the Kolchak unit. After successfully executing the assignment, Varya returns and finds the village occupied by the White Guard units. The Kolchak forces brutally crack down on peasants, demanding discharge of the partisans.

With the city's underground fighters, Varya manages to transmit weapons and illegal literature to the partisans. This gives them the opportunity to destroy the Kolchak regiment. In the city Varya meets a man who charges her with an important first task. With him she campaigns among the miners. White Guards arrest members of the clandestine meetings among whom is Varya. Those arrested are taken by ship, which is piloted by one of the underground workers ...

== Cast ==
- Sergei Bartenev as Kosykh
- Mikhail Lenin as Aleksandr Kolchak
- Sergei Troitsky as General Tregubov

== Bibliography ==
- Christie, Ian & Taylor, Richard. The Film Factory: Russian and Soviet Cinema in Documents 1896-1939. Routledge, 2012.
