= Daniel Chonkadze =

Georgian writer

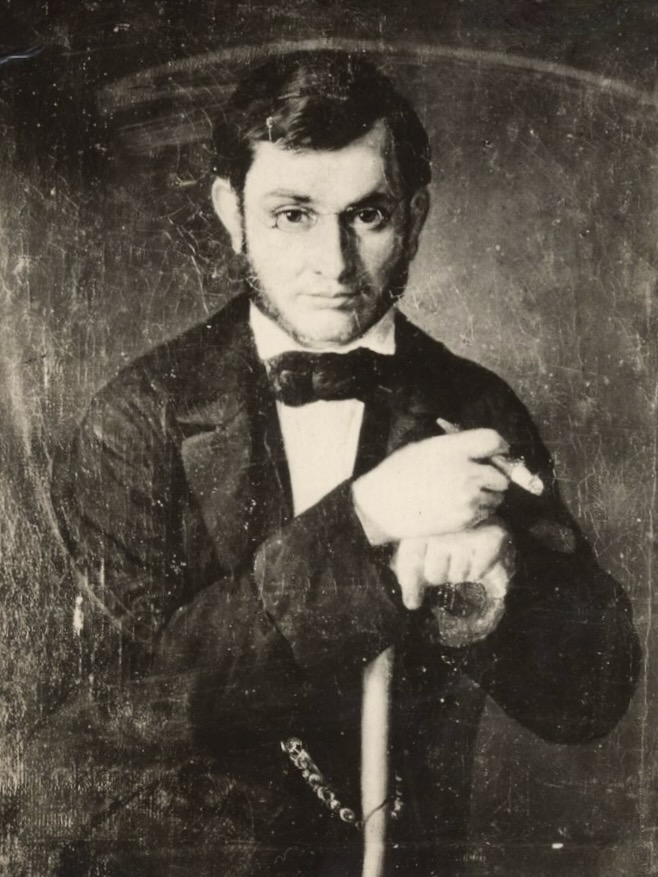
Daniel Chonkadze

Daniel Giorgis dze Chonkadze (Georgian: დანიელ გიორგის ძე ჭონქაძე) (c. 1830 – June 16, 1860) was a Georgian novelist. He is primarily known for his resonant novella "Surami Fortress", which contained social commentary of early 19th century Georgia and criticized serfdom; it was subsequently made into a film.

In addition to his contributions to Georgian literature, Chonkadze was also a teacher and translator of the Ossetian language and folklore, for which he has been described as "a founder-father of Ossetic literature".

== Biography ==
Chonkadze was born to a peasant family near Dusheti, Georgia, then part of the Russian Empire. His native village housed both Georgians and Ossetians, which inspired the future writer's lively interest in both Georgian and Ossetian folk traditions. Educated at the seminaries of Vladikavkaz and Tbilisi, Chonkadze then taught Ossetic in Stavropol and Tbilisi in the 1850s. Simultaneously he served as a church official, but later abandoned his clerical status. Much of his work was on Georgian and Ossetic folklore. He authored an unfinished Russian-Ossetic dictionary, and wrote down a collection of Ossetic proverbs using an alphabet invented by Professor Anders Sjögren for the Ossetians. For this reason, he has been recognized by some as "a founder-father of Ossetic literature".

Chonkadze’s first and last published work, Suramis tsikhe, garnered a long-lasting success. Published in 1859/60 in the Georgian literary journal Tsiskari ("Dawn"), the novella is a mixture of folklore, history, political protest, and romantic drama in which Chonkadze passionately attacks serfdom. For censorship reasons, the tale was given a medieval setting filled with allegories. The contemporary socio-political system is symbolized by the crumbling Surami fortress that requires a living person to be buried within its walls to stand firm. The novel was filmed by the eminent Armenian filmmaker Sergei Parajanov who directed his multi-award-winning The Legend of Suram Fortress in the 1980s.

Chonkadze died of tuberculosis at the age of thirty, and many of his writings were destroyed by his relatives as a potential source of infection.

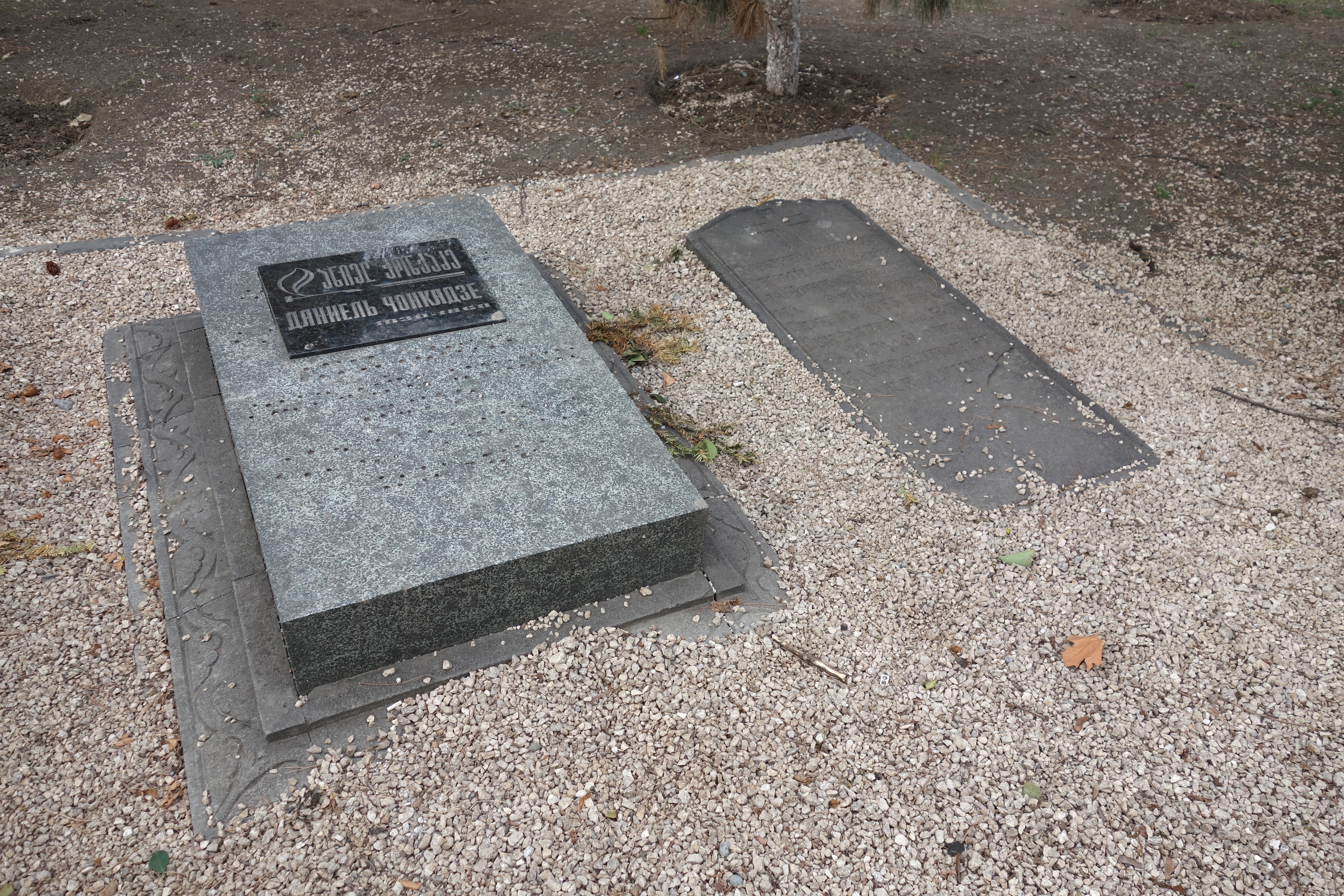
The graves of D. Chonkadze and his wife in Vera Park, Tbilisi

== See also ==
- Egnate Ninoshvili
- Vasil Barnovi
