= The Suram Fortress =

1922 film

- Directed by: Ivan Perestiani
- Written by: Ivan Perestiani; Daniel Chonkadze (novel)
- Starring: Hamo Beknazarian, Mikheil Chiaureli
- Cinematography: Boris Zavelev
- Production company: Kinos Seqtsia
- Release date: 10 October 1922
- Running time: 70 minutes
- Country: Soviet Union
- Languages: Silent film Russian intertitles

The Suram Fortress (Suramis tsikhe) (Georgian: სურამის ციხე, Russian: Сурамская крепость) is a 1922 Soviet Georgian adventure film directed by Ivan Perestiani, based on Daniel Chonkadze's novel with the same title.

== Plot ==
The film consists of two novellas. The first is dedicated to the tragic fate of the serf peasant girl Maria. The action of the second novella takes place in Imereti. A serf girl gives birth to a boy by the son of a landowner. By the order of the old prince, the child is kidnapped and sent to be raised in Tiflis. Years pass. Durmishkhan is raised by the prince’s sister along with his peer, the orphan Vardua. When Durmishkhan embarks on his first journey, he swears his love and loyalty to Vardua, but soon marries another and settles in Surami. Upon learning of her lover's betrayal, Vardua decides to take cruel revenge. During a Turkish invasion of Imereti, she convinces the Georgian king that he will be victorious if Durmishkhan’s son is sealed alive within the wall of the Surami Fortress. The king orders the seer's command to be carried out.

== Cast ==
- Hamo Beknazarian - Durmishkhani (as Aleqsandre Bek-Nazarovi)
- Mikheil Chiaureli - Osman Aga
- Shalva Dadiani - Count Tsereteli
- Tamar Sakvarelidze - Vardua (as T. Sakvarelidze)
- Tatyana Maksimova - Gaiane (as T. Maksimova)
- L. Galustyan - Zurabi
- Nino Dolidze - Nino (as N. Dolidze)
- Olga Maisuryan - Mother of Nino and Osman Aqa (as O. Maisuryan)
- N. Odankevich - Prince Mukhraneli
- Vanda Polikevich - Princess Mukhraneli (as V. Polikevich)
- Emanuel Afkhaidze - Messenger
- Valerian Gunia - Minister
- Zaqaria Berishvili (as Z. Berishvili)
- Giorgi Davitashvili

== Crew ==
=== Production designers ===
- V. Akishni
- Yevgeni Lansere (as E. Lansere)
- Valerian Sidamon-Eristavi
- K. Tiri

=== Art directors ===
- Yevgeni Lansere (as E. Lansere)
- Valerian Sidamon-Eristavi
- (Assistant) V. Akishni
- (Assistant) K. Tiri
