= Nikoloz Shengelaia =

Nikoloz Shengelaia (Georgian: ნიკოლოზ შენგელაია, Russian: Николай Михайлович Шенгелая; Obudzhi, Tsalenjikha District 8 August [O.S. 26 July] 1903 – Tbilisi, 4 January 1943) was a Soviet Georgian film director.

Nikoloz Shengelaia was one of the founders of Georgian cinema. His epic 1928 silent film “Eliso” is about the exile of Circassian and Chechen people and the colonization of their land in the Caucasus Mountains by imperial Russia. The film has a broad range of themes such as betrayal, social injustice, and resilience in the face of adversity. The film's protagonist is a passionate and brave young woman. Nikoloz Shengelaia put Georgian cinema on the map with “Eliso.”

Nikoloz Shengelaia was married to the movie star, Nato Vachnadze. He had two sons, Giorgi Shengelaia and Eldar Shengelaia, both of whom became film directors as well.

== Selected filmography ==
- Giuli (1927)
- Eliso (1928)
- Twenty-Six Commissars (1932)
- The Golden Valley (1937)
- Motherland (1939)
- In the Black Mountains (1941)
- He Would Come Back (1943)
