= My Grandmother =

1929 Georgian film

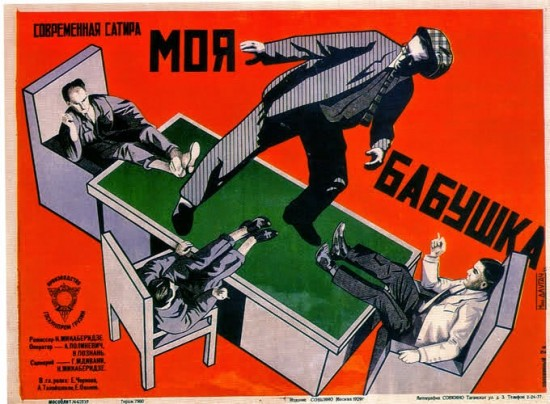
- Lobby card
- Directed by: Kote Mikaberidze
- Written by: Kote Mikaberidze; Siko Dolidze; Giorgi Mdivani
- Starring: Aleksandre Takaishvili; Bella Chernova; Evgeniy Ovanov; Akaki Khorava
- Cinematography: Anton Polikevich; Vladimir Poznan
- Production company: JSC "Sakhkinmretsvi"
- Release date: 1929
- Country: Soviet Union (Georgian SSR)
- Language: Silent (Georgian intertitles)

My Grandmother (Georgian: ნათლიმამა, Russian: Моя бабушка) is a 1929 Soviet Georgian comedy directed by Kote Mikaberidze. Filmed in 1928, the film was banned as "anti-Soviet" upon its 1929 release, shelved for 39 years, and not widely screened again until its 1976 restoration by Leila Gordeladze. The film is noted for its Expressionist sets by designer Irakli Gamrekeli and its satirical attitude towards bureaucracy and red tape.

== Plot ==
After being fired, an incompetent bureaucrat must search out a "grandmother" (a benefactor among the executives) to give him a letter of recommendation for a new job.

== Cast ==
- Aleksandre Takaishvili as The Bureaucrat
- Bella Chernova as The Bureaucrat's Wife
- Evgeniy Ovanov as The Doorman
- Akaki Khorava as Laborer
- Mikhail Abesadze
- G. Absaliamova
- Konstantin Lavretski

== Production ==
In his memoirs, director Kote Mikaberidze stated that "I was directing a satirical film, the aim of which was to denounce and deride bureaucracy, petty bourgeoisie, and protectionism. With these aims in mind, I was trying to discover new and sharp ways of cinematographic expression because a simple "slavish illustration" of the script was not satisfying for me as a creative person."

== Reception ==
In a 2012 poll of film critics by Tbilisi Intermedia, My Grandmother was listed fourth among the 12 best films of Georgian cinema.
