= Nikolai Tseretelli =

Soviet stage and silent film actor

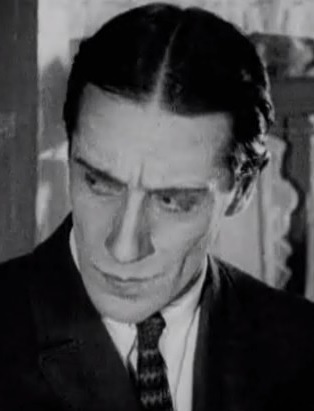
- Nikolai Tseretelli as Lagutin in Papirosnitsa ot Mosselproma (1924)
- Born: Said Mir Khudoyar Khan; 1 October 1890; Moscow, Russian Empire
- Died: 6 February 1942 (aged 51); Kirov, Kirov Oblast, USSR
- Other names: Nikolai Tsereteli
- Occupation: actor
- Years active: 1912-1941

Nikolai Mikhailovich Tseretelli (Russian: Николай Михайлович Церетелли) 1 October 1890 – 6 February 1942 was a Soviet stage and silent film actor of Uzbek origin.

In 1923, the German artist Max Beckmann drew a portrait of him with "sly, sideways glance and the warm, wry smile".

== Filmography ==
- Papirosnitsa ot Mosselproma (1924) as Latugin, cameraman
- Aelita (1924) as Engineer Los/Spiridinov
- Nabat (1917)
- Zelyonyy pauk (1916)
- Chess of Life (1916) as Mark Rudnetskiy

== See also ==
- Igor Ilyinsky
- Anatoli Ktorov
