= Public Service Hall =

Concept Designs In Georgia

- იუსტიციის სახლი
- Public Service Hall logo

Agency overview
- Formed: 2011
- Website: psh.gov.ge

Public Service Hall (Georgian: იუსტიციის სახლი, romanized: iust'itsiis sakhli) is an agency of the Georgian government which provides a variety of public services, including the services of the Civil Registry Agency, the National Agency of Public Registry, the National Archives, the National Bureau of Enforcement and the Notary Chamber of Georgia. Services are made available at public service halls throughout the country. Currently, Public Service Hall endeavors to provide up to 400 services at the main location in Tbilisi.

== Structure ==
Tbilisi Public Service Hall

Consumers at the entrance of the Public Service Hall building in Tbilisi are greeted by the service consultants, who put them on the right track with regard to their issue and direct them to relevant operators. It is divided into 3 major areas: self-service space, quick service space, and long service space.

=== Self-service Area ===
Batumi Public Service Hall

Automated systems are placed in the self-service area. Consumers are able to receive diverse services, such as; extract on property or business registration, biometric photos for ID card and passport, cash withdrawal from ATMs, conducting distance payments via pay boxes, etc.

=== Quick Service Area ===
In Quick Service Area, consumers are able to receive the services, duration of which do not exceed 2 minutes. For instance, issuance of already printed ID card and Passports, Birth and Marriage Certificates, Documents certified by apostille or legalization, extracts on property and business registration, etc.

=== Long Service Area ===
In Long Service Area, consumers are able to receive the services, delivery of which requires more than 5 minutes, such as submission of an applications for Passport, ID cards, registration of property and business, receipt of biographical certificates from the Archive, etc. Such division of service area minimizes the risk for creation of mass, crowds, and chaotic queues in the service area and makes citizens more organized and queue of customers who wish to receive services is regulated through an integrated Queue Management Electronic System.

== Economic Model ==
Service provision and its costs are calculated based on the requested delivery period of the service. In case a person requests the service to be provided in a shorter time frame than the regular period, the additional costs apply to the service.

== Most demanded services ==
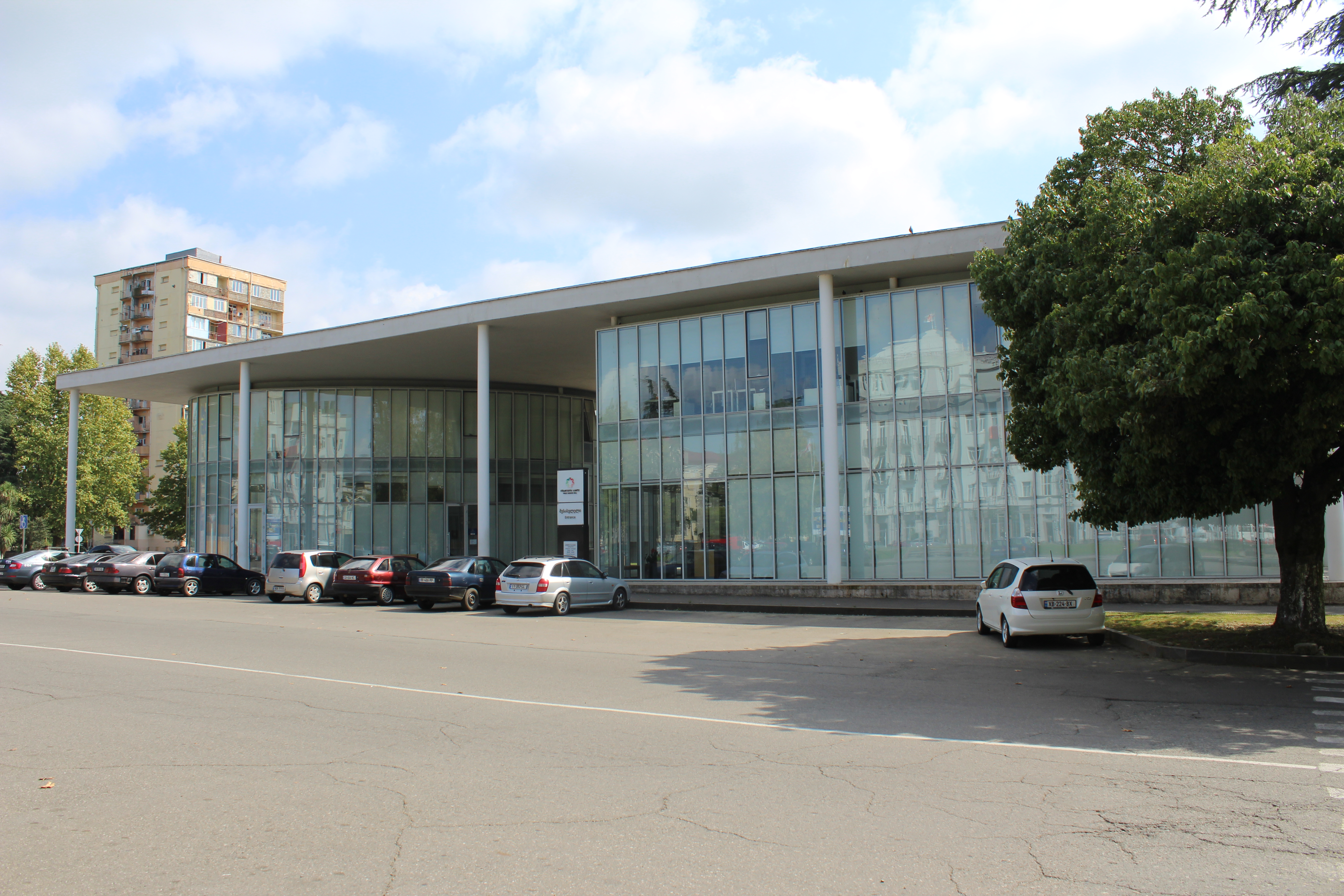
Public Service Hall in Ozurgeti

- ID card
- Marriage registration
- Passport
- Birth registration
- Property registration

== Branches ==
Map of Public Service Hall Branches

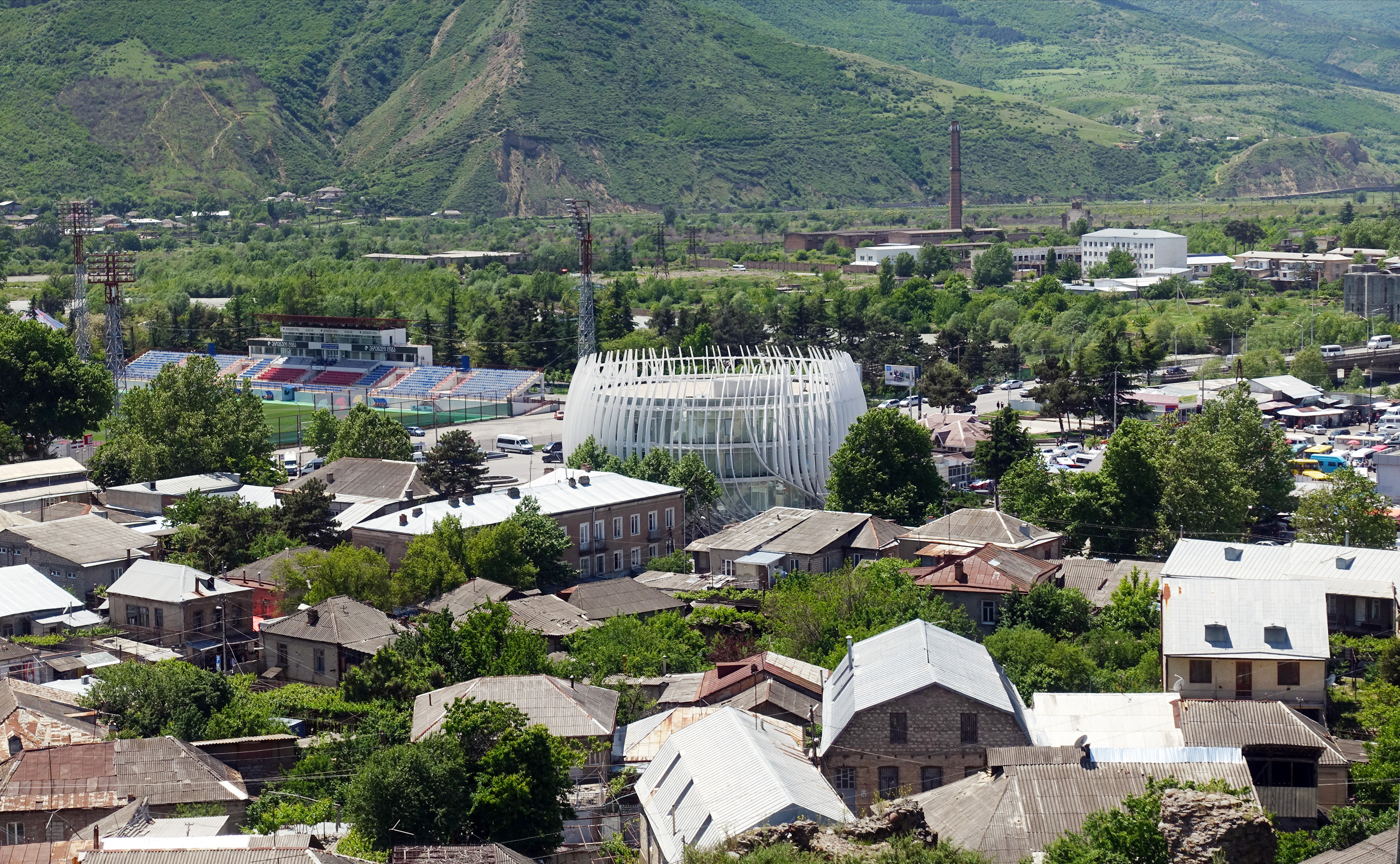
View on the Gori Public Service Hall

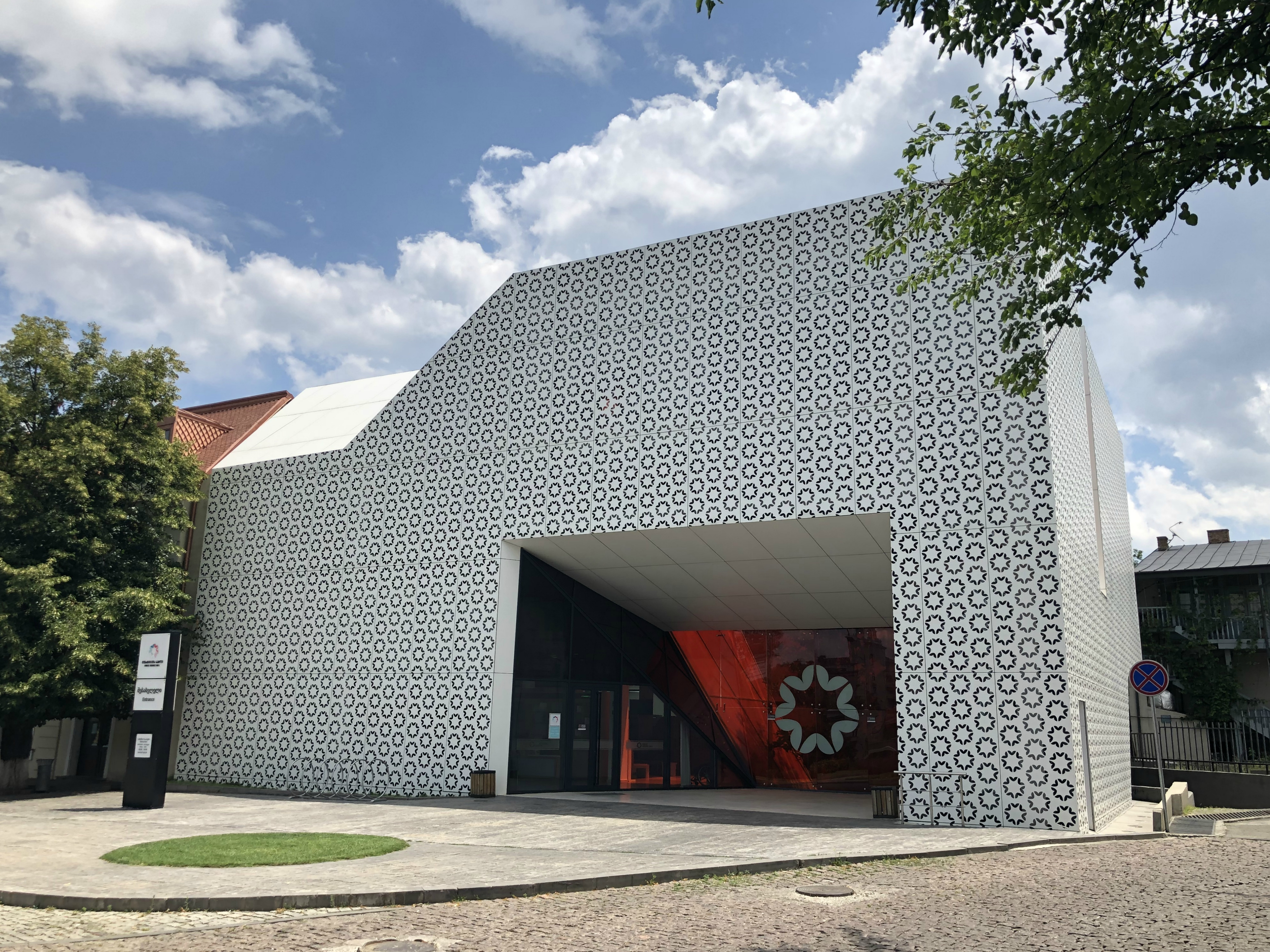
Telavi public service hall

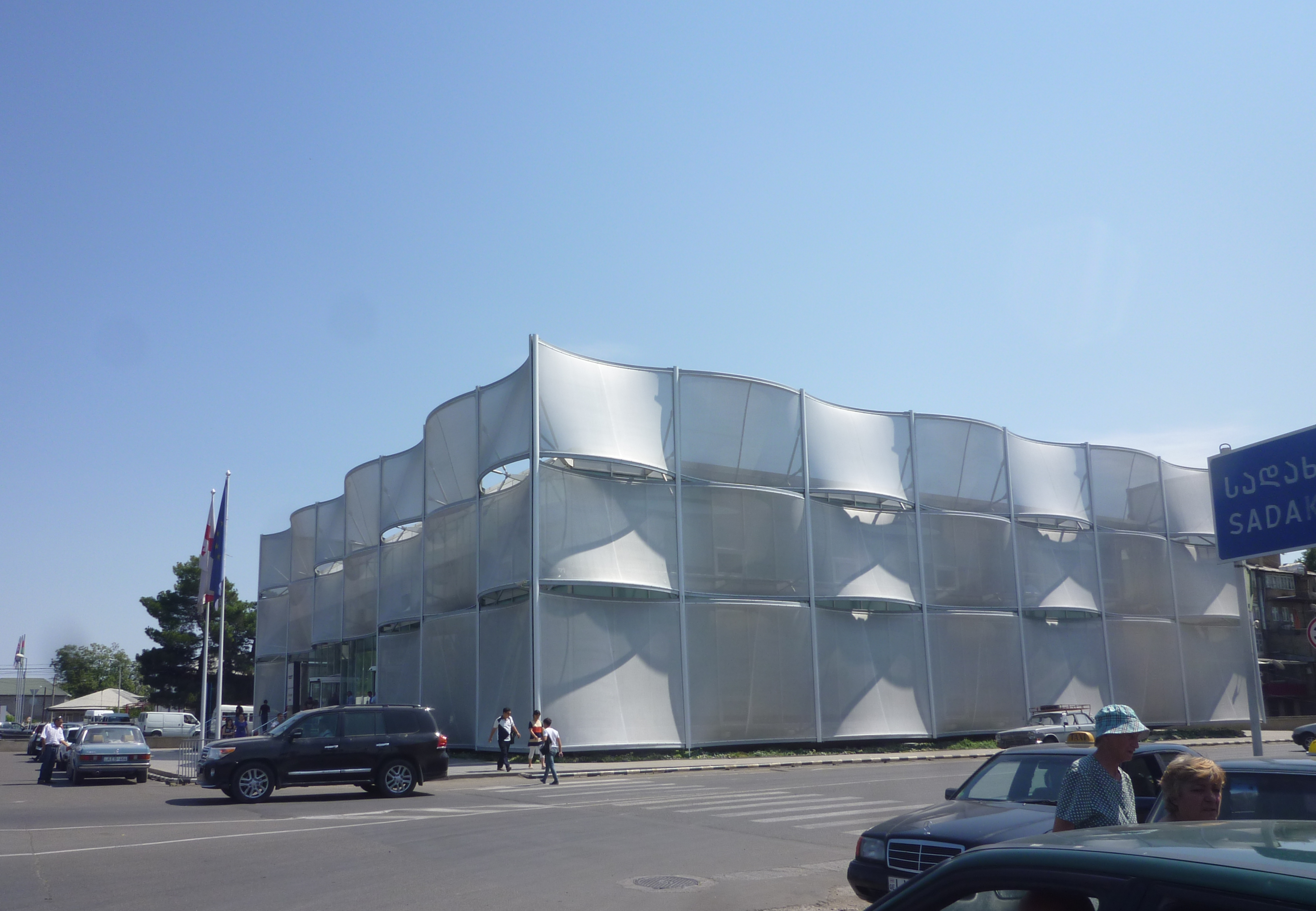
Marneuli public service hall

Public Service Halls have been opened in several cities of Georgia:

City/Town	Branch Address	Postal Code	City/Town	Branch Address	Postal Code
Akhalkalaki	Tavisupleba St. No.9	0700	Akhaltsikhe	Mikheil Tamarashvili St. No.3	0800
Batumi	Sheriff Khimshiashvili St. No.7	6010	Bolnisi	Sulkhan-Saba Orbeliani St. No.111a	1100
Borjomi	Erekle St. No.2	1200	Gardabani	Davit Aghmashenebeli St. No.83	1300
Gori	Davit Guramishvili St. No.7	1400	Gurjaani	Tavisupleba St. No.15a	1500
Kareli	Megobroba St.	4500	Khoni	Mose Khoneli St. No.40	5900
Kutaisi	Irakli Abashidze Ave. No.20	4600	Kvareli	Ilia Chavchavadze St. No.57	4800
Lagodekhi	Zakatala St. No.25g	2700	Marneuli	Shota Rustaveli No.1	3000
Martvili	Konstantine Gamsakhurdia St. No.2	3100	Mestia	Ilia Gabliani St. No.1	3200
Oni	Vakhtang VI St. No.8g	3600	Ozurgeti	Ioane Petritsi St. No.9	3500
Poti	Sh. Rustaveli Encirclement No.26	4400	Rustavi	Megobroba Ave. No.29	3700
Senaki	Akaki Eliava St. No.23	4106	Stepantsminda	Aleksandre Kazbegi St. No.49	4700
Tbilisi	Sanapiro St. No.2	0105	Telavi	Erekle II Square No.4	2200
Tianeti	Davit Sanikidze St. No.3	2500	Zugdidi	Teatri St. No.2	2100

== Awards ==
- Winner of New Georgian Brand of 2011
- UN Public Service Award 2012 winner in the nomination of Improvement of Public Service Delivery

== Influence ==
In Indonesia, the "public service mall" first established in 2017 in Banyuwangi, East Java was directly inspired by the Public Service Hall, with a MoU being signed in 2017 between the Georgian and Indonesian governments for exchanging study tours.
