= The Story of an Unknown Man =

1893 novella by Anton Chekhov

- Author: Anton Chekhov
- Original title: Рассказ неивестного человека
- Translator: Hugh Aplin
- Subject: terrorism
- Set in: St. Petersburg, Russia
- Publisher: Russkaya Mysl, Hesperus Press Limited
- Publication date: 1893
- Pages: 100
- ISBN: 1-84391-003-9

The Story of an Unknown Man (Russian: Рассказ неизвестного человека, romanized: Rasskaz neizvestnovo cheloveka), translated also as The Story of a Nobody and An Anonymous Story, is an 1893 novella by Anton Chekhov first published by Russkaya Mysl, in Nos. 2 and 3 (February and March) 1893 issues. In a revised version Chekhov included into Volume 6 of his Collected Works, published by Adolf Marks in 1899–1901.

The original idea of the story came to Chekhov in the late 1880s. In a May 1893 letter he told the writer Lyubov Gurevich that he had "started to write it 1887–88 without any intention of getting it published, then dropped it". He returned to the idea in 1891, giving it originally the title The Story of My Patient (Рассказ моего пациента).

The novella concerns a revolutionary working undercover as a servant, and, being the only one of Chekhov's major works to be set in St. Petersburg, shares some motifs with the works of Dostoevsky.

== Plot ==
An anonymous assassin is sent to infiltrate the St. Petersburg household of Orlov, the son of a minister deemed a "serious enemy", by an unnamed radical cause. While masquerading as a servant, the narrator spies on the household and observes the extravagant and frivolous habits of the wealthy family, and is repelled by Orlov's aloof treatment of his lover Zinaida. He eventually becomes disillusioned with his mission and the purposelessness of life itself, comparing his own deceitfulness with the womanizing Orlov's self-awareness, and abandons his mission.

== Analysis ==
The Independent includes The Story of a Nobody among the "finest fiction" that explore terrorism and its motives, through lens of tsarist Russia. Translator Hugh Aplin compares the piece to the works of Turgenev in its capturing post-serfdom, pre-Soviet radicalism, as well both authors' creation of female characters with "great moral integrity" compared with their male counterparts. Louis de Bernières, who described The Story of a Nobody as a "wonderful piece of literature", says the disturbing power and entertainment of the novella derives from Chekhov's absolute lack of authorial moral stance, underlain by the narrator's cognitive dissonance when his radical passion turns to pessimism when confronted with the pettiness and cruelty of Orlov. University of Edinburgh professor Tony McKibbin describes this ambiguity as "Chekhovian irony is at its most pronounced", and summarizes the reader's responsibility to make an "ethical import in the gaps" in a story void of any heroes.
