= In the Whirlwind of Revolution =

1922 film

- Directed by: Aleksandr Chargonin
- Written by: P. Voyevodin
- Cinematography: Yuri Zhelyabuzhsky
- Production company: VFKO
- Release date: 1922
- Country: Soviet Union
- Languages: Silent; Russian intertitles

In the Whirlwind of Revolution (Russian: В вихре революции, romanized: V vikhre revolyutsii) is a 1922 Soviet silent drama film directed by Aleksandr Chargonin. The film is about a miners' strike in Tsarist Russia. Against the background of the events develops a romance between the head of the workers and a girl from a wealthy family.

The film's art direction was by Vladimir Ballyuzek.

== Cast ==
- Zoya Barantsevich
- N. Vishnyak

== Bibliography ==
- Derek Spring & Richard Taylor. Stalinism and Soviet Cinema. Routledge, 2013.
