= The Palace and the Fortress =

1924 film

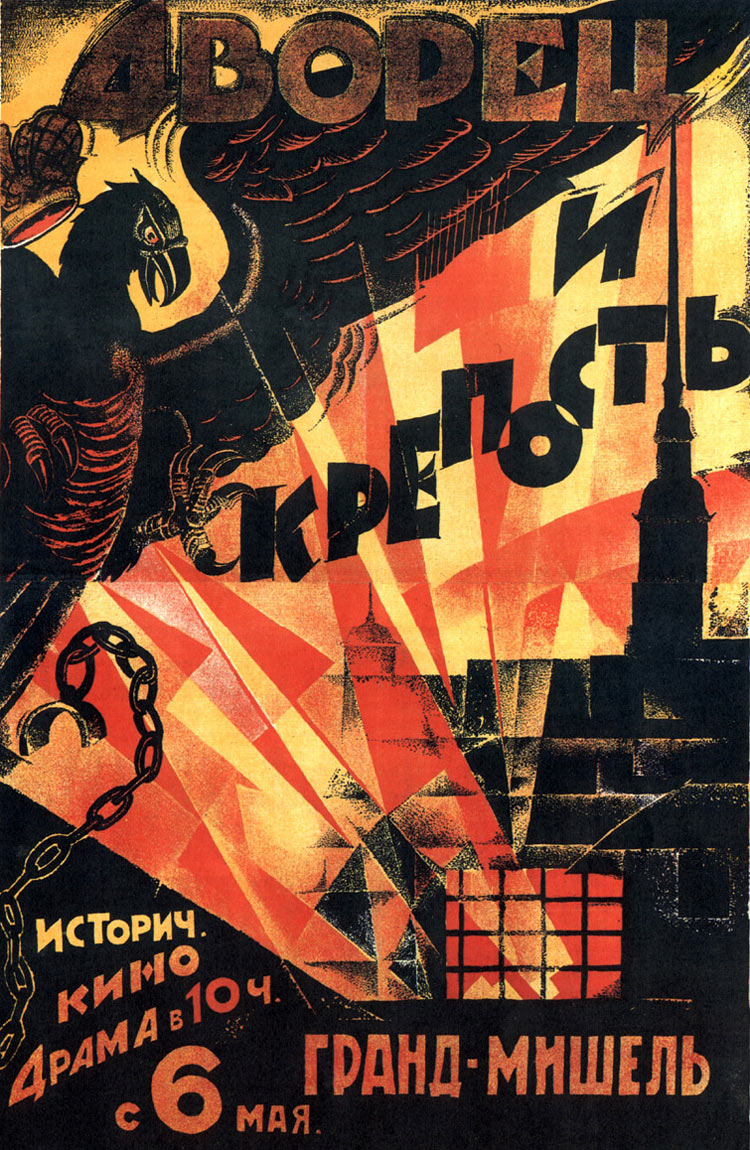
- Directed by: Aleksandr Ivanovsky
- Written by: Olga Forsh; Pavel Shchyogolev
- Cinematography: Ivan Frolov
- Production company: Sevzapkino
- Release date: 5 February 1924
- Running time: 100 minutes
- Country: Soviet Union
- Languages: Silent; Russian intertitles

The Palace and the Fortress (1924)

The Palace and the Fortress (Russian: Дворец и крепость, romanized: Dvorets i krepost) is a 1924 Soviet silent biopic directed by Aleksandr Ivanovsky. The film is about the tragic fate of revolutionary democrat Mikhail Beideman who was held prisoner at the Peter and Paul Fortress and spent over twenty years in the west Alexei-ravelin.

== Plot ==
The film tells the story of Mikhail Beideman, who, at the age of 21, was imprisoned without trial or investigation in the Peter and Paul Fortress by the sole order of Alexander II. Beydeman spent more than twenty years in captivity.

The opening titles set the scene: “Within the walls of the Peter and Paul Fortress, the enemies of Russian autocracy languish, while on the opposite bank of the Neva stands the grandiose Winter Palace…”

Beydeman, a young officer cadet, lives with his mother and sisters in a modest apartment. He is in love with Vera, the daughter of a wealthy landowner, Lagutin. However, Vera’s hand is also sought by Prince Kurakin. Amid these personal dramas, the Narodnaya Volya revolutionaries detonate a bomb targeting the tsar’s carriage, prompting a crackdown on those suspected of opposing the monarchy. Beydeman is arrested and spends the next two decades in the grim confines of the Peter and Paul Fortress.

When Beydeman is finally released, he is aged, mentally broken, and unable to comprehend his newfound freedom. A chance encounter with Vera, his former love, proves devastating for both. They barely recognize one another, and the shock of their reunion results in their deaths.

== Cast ==
- Yevgeni Boronikhin
- Yuri Korvin-Krukovsky
- Marina Yuryeva
- Kondrat Yakovlev
- Sergei Shishko
- Gennadiy Michurin as Dmitriy Karakozov
- Pyotr Andriyevsky
- Yakov Malyutin
- N. Komarovskaya
- Petr Kuznetsov

== Bibliography ==
- Christie, Ian & Taylor, Richard. The Film Factory: Russian and Soviet Cinema in Documents 1896-1939. Routledge, 2012.
