= The Cigarette Girl from Mosselprom =

1924 film

- Directed by: Yuri Zhelyabuzhsky
- Written by: Aleksei Fajko; Fedor Ozep
- Starring: Igor Ilyinsky; Yuliya Solntseva; Nikolai Tseretelli
- Cinematography: Yuri Zhelyabuzhsky
- Production company: Mezhrabpom-Russ
- Release date: 2 December 1924 (USSR)
- Country: USSR
- Language: Silent film (Russian intertitles)

The Cigarette Girl from Mosselprom (Russian: Папиросница от Моссельпрома, romanized: Papirosnitsa ot Mosselproma) is a 1924 Soviet film. The silent comedy film is directed by Yuri Zhelyabuzhsky and stars Igor Ilyinsky.

== Plot ==
The Cigarette Girl from Mosselprom (1924)

As she works in her tedious office job, Maria Ivanovna dreams about being married, and she has particular hopes that co-worker Nikodim Mityushin (Igor Ilyinsky) will take an interest in her. Nikodim, however, is in love with Zina (Yuliya Solntseva), who sells cigarettes on the sidewalk, and he frequently buys cigarettes from her even though he does not smoke.

One day, a film crew uses Zina as an extra in an outdoor scene, and the cameraman, Latugin (Nikolai Tseretelli), falls in love with her. Latugin soon arranges an acting job for Zina. To complicate matters further, Zina has yet another admirer in Oliver MacBride, an American businessman who is visiting Moscow.

== Cast ==
- Igor Ilyinsky as Nikodim Mityushin, bookkeeper
- Yuliya Solntseva as Zina Vesenina, cigarette girl
- Anna Dmokhovskaya as Maria Ivanovna
- Nikolai Tseretelli as Latugin, cameraman
- Leonid Baratov as Barsov-Aragonsky, film director
- Mark Tsibulskiy as Oliver Mac-Bride, American

== See also ==
- The Three Million Trial
- A Kiss From Mary Pickford
- Miss Mend
