= Who Is To Blame? =

Who Is To Blame
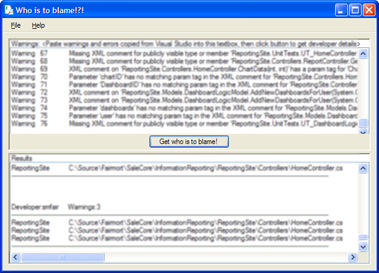
- Who is to blame!?! - The program being run on Windows XP.
- Developer: Fairmort
- Stable release: 1.0.0 / August 28, 2009; 16 years ago
- Operating system: Microsoft Windows
- License: GNU General Public License
- Website: fairmort.com

Who Is To Blame is a utility that processes warnings and errors from Microsoft Visual Studio. It utilises the Subversion (SVN) Blame tool to generate a report identifying which software developer added or amended the line that caused the warning or error. It is free software released under the GNU General Public License and uses SVN and the Microsoft .NET Framework 3.5.

== See also ==
- Subversion
- Microsoft Visual Studio
