= Czerwone ciernie =

1976 film by Julian Dziedzina

Czerwone ciernie is a Polish historical film. It was released in 1976.

== Cast ==
- Jan Nowicki (Stefan Wojnicz)
- Emilia Krakowska (Mańka)
- Barbara Wrzesińska (Julia)
- Stanisław Jaśkiewicz
- Władimir Iwaszow (Władimir)
- Mieczysław Hryniewicz (Sułek)
- Maria Klejdysz (Sułkowa)
- Mieczysław Voit (Legart)
- Michał Pawlicki (Sznajder)
- Stanisław Michalski (Leśniewski)
- Henryk Bista (Rosenblatt)
- Jan Padkowski (Kolasa)
- Zygmunt Hobot
- Piotr Łysak (Kamil)
- Bolesław Płotnicki
- Henryk Machalica
- Eugeniusz Wałaszek
- Andrzej Jurczak
- Zygmunt Wiaderny
- Zdzisław Szymborski
- Irena Burawska
