= Mikhail Beideman =

Russian politician

Mikhail Stepanovich Beideman (Russian: Михаил Степанович Бейдеман; 22 October [O.S. 20 October] 1839 – 17 December [O.S. 5 December] 1887) was Russian revolutionary who became known during his long imprisonment without trial as the "mystery prisoner".

== Biography ==
He was born into the minor nobility in Bessarabia. He graduated in 1860 from the Konstantinov Military Academy. Two weeks later, he emigrated to London, where he worked as a typesetter on the journal Kolokol. After 14 months abroad, he heard about the decision by the Tsar Alexander II to emancipate Russia's serfs and decided to return to try to ferment a peasants' revolt. Arrested at the border in August 1861, he was found in possession of a fake 'manifesto' torn into small pieces and stored in the bottom of a box of cigarettes. When pieced together, it proved to be a proclamation, supposedly signed by Grand Duke Konstantin, the former heir to the throne who had abdicated in 1825 in favour of his younger brother, Alexander II's father, Nicholas I, which declared that “The Russian people will rule on their own, officials and all clerical servants will be driven out.”. The Tsar ordered that Beideman was to be held without trial in the Alexeyevsky ravelin, in the Peter and Paul Fortress in St Petersburg, and kept there "until further notice". He was held there for 20 years. Shortly after the assassination of Alexander II, he was transferred to a psychiatric hospital in Kazan, where he was confined for six more years, until his death, aged 48.

== In literature ==
The novel, Одетый Камнем (Clad in Stone), published in 1925, by Olga Forsh, features a fictional narrator, Sergei Rusanin, who is writing years later about how he knew and had betrayed Beideman. He comes to identify with the imprisoned man so much that he thinks he is Beideman.
