= Three Lives (film) =

1924 film

- Directed by: Ivan Perestiani
- Starring: Nato Vachnadze; Mikheil Gelovani; Dimitri Kipiani
- Distributed by: Sakhkinmretsvi
- Release date: 1924
- Running time: 160 minutes
- Countries: Georgian SSR; Soviet Union
- Language: Georgian

Three Lives (Georgian: სამი სიცოცხლე, Russian: Три жизни, sometimes Who is to Blame?) is a 1924 Soviet silent film directed by Ivan Perestiani. The theme of the movie was copied from ancient Indian culture.

== Plot ==
The film is set in Georgia between 1880 and 1890. Former shepherd Bakhva Pulava gradually rises up the social ladder; first as a foreman on the construction of a railway, then as a cunning profiteer, and finally as a significant capitalist-landowner.

Bakhva achieves a prominent position in society. He falls in love with Esma, a poor seamstress, and marries her. However, a fortune teller's ominous prediction comes true: shortly after their marriage, Esma is abducted by Jeremia Tsarba, a lazy and corrupt ensign from a noble family. Bakhva and his friends pursue Jeremia, but when cornered, Jeremia murders Esma to avoid capture.

Devastated by his wife's death, Bakhva vows revenge. Jeremia seeks refuge with his relative Valida, a cunning woman who wields influence over Colonel Lebov, a high-ranking official. Using her connections, Valida ensures Jeremia's acquittal.

Consumed by grief and rage, Bakhva and his allies infiltrate Jeremia's residence and assassinate him with a dagger. Bakhva then surrenders to the authorities and confesses to the crime.

== Cast ==
- Nato Vachnadze as Esma
- Mikheil Gelovani as Bakhva
- Dimitri Kipiani as Yeremia Tsarba
