= Before the Hurricane =

1924 Georgian black-and-white silent film

Qarishkhlis tsin
- Directed by: Kote Marjanishvili
- Written by: Shalva Dadiani
- Distributed by: Sakhkinmretsvi
- Release date: 3 August 1924 (Georgian SSR)
- Running time: 40 minutes
- Countries: Georgian SSR, Soviet Union
- Languages: Georgian; Russian

Before the Hurricane (translit. Qarishkhlis tsin, Burevestnik in Russian) is a 1924 Soviet-era Georgian black-and-white silent film directed by Kote Marjanishvili based on a script by Shalva Dadiani.

== Plot ==
The film is set in 1905 in a textile factory in Tiflis where two friends are working, Lado and Tade. Lado falls in love with Tade's sister, Tasya. Prince Rostam orders his servants to bring her to him. The friends manage to free the girl and after this they become part of the revolutionary underground ...

== Cast ==
- L. Kavsadze as Gijua
- L. Gogoberidze as Tasya
- I. Djordjadze as Maro
- L. Qartvelishvili as Tade
- L. Sokolovi as Revolutionist
- N. Gotsiridze as Old man
- M. Arnazi as Krilova
- Aleqsandre Imedashvili as Petua
- A. Alshibaya as Count Gigo
- Soso Jividze as Saqua
- Ushangi Chkheidze as Niko
- D. Mjavya as Police-officer
- Q. Andronikashvili as Katine
- G. Pronispireli as Kinto
- D. Chkheidze as Priest

== See also ==
- List of Georgian films
