= Alexander Kazbegi =

Georgian writer

Aleksandre Kazbegi
- Alexander Kazbegi. Photo by A. Roinashvili, 1880s.
- Born: 20 January 1848; Stepantsminda, Tiflis Governorate, Russian Empire
- Died: 22 December 1890 (aged 42); Tiflis, Tiflis Governorate, Russian Empire
- Resting place: Mtatsminda Pantheon, Tbilisi
- Occupations: Writer, novelist, journalist
- Writing career
- Literary movement: Romanticism, Realism

Alexander Kazbegi (Georgian: ალექსანდრე ყაზბეგი; 20 January 1848 – 22 December 1893) was a Georgian writer, best known for his 1883 novel The Patricide.

== Biography ==
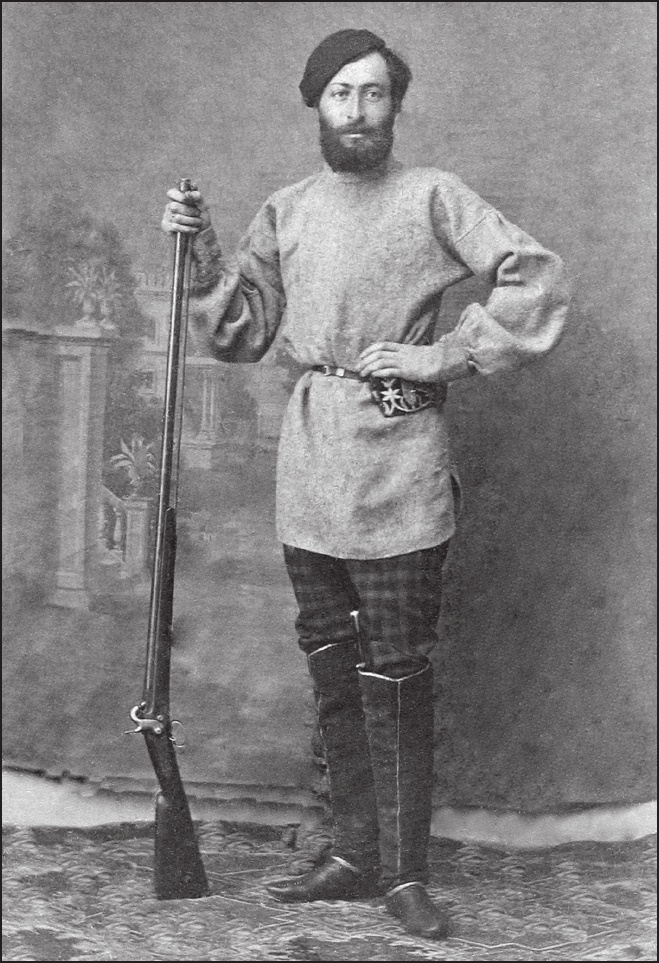
Kazbegi as an actor

Kazbegi was born in Stepantsminda the great grandson of Kazibek Chopikashvili, a local feudal magnate who was in charge of collecting tolls on the Georgian Military Highway. Alexander Kazbegi studied in Tbilisi, Saint Petersburg and Moscow, but on returning home, decided to become a shepherd to experience the lives of the local people. He later worked as a journalist, and then became a novelist and playwright. In his later life, he suffered from insanity. After his death in Tbilisi, his coffin was carried across the Jvari Pass to his hometown of Kazbegi (now renamed Stepantsminda), which also preserves his childhood home as a museum in his honor.

His most famous work, the novel The Patricide, is about a heroic Caucasian bandit named Koba, who, much like Robin Hood, is a defender of the poor. Koba has nothing but contempt for authority, a proclivity towards violence, and a firm belief in vengeance. Kazbegi's work was a major inspiration to Ioseb Jughashvili, later known as Joseph Stalin, who used Koba as a revolutionary pseudonym.

== Museum ==
The World Bank is supporting restoration of the Alexander Kazbegi Museum.
