= Notary Chamber of Georgia =

Notary Chamber of Georgia 1996

The Notary Chamber of Georgia is a legal entity of public law that was established on May 3, 1996, pursuant to the Georgian Law about Notary. The Notary Chamber of Georgia is based upon compulsory membership of notaries. The Supreme management body of the Notary Chamber of Georgia is the General Meeting of Members of the Chamber, while its executive body is the Board of the Chamber, consisting of 7 members to be elected by the General Meeting of Members at nomination of the Minister of Justice. The state control over notary activity is performed by the Ministry of Justice (Georgia), being entitled to inspect notary's official activities, but having no right to intervene in performing notary acts by the notary. Since October 2007, the Notary Chamber of Georgia has become a member of the International Union of Latin Notaries. International Union of Latin Notaries.

== Functions and aims ==
The Notary Chamber of Georgia represents and protects notaries’ interests and assists them in performing their duties. The Chamber involves notaries solving the unique problems associated with notary services and implementation of general professional interests of notaries. The Training Center under the Chamber administers training of notary candidates and oversees the qualification of notaries and notary offices.

== Professional Day of Notaries ==
The Professional day of Notaries, on November 7, has been celebrated in Georgia since 2002. The day was associated with Christian festivities, in particular the remembrance day of Saint Marcianus and Martvir. In the 4th century these saints served in the cathedral of Constantinople and were notaries of the patriarch, Paul the Confessor. It is dedicated to summarizing introduced reforms and achievements of notary and charity.

== Deontology Code of Notaries ==
A Deontology code of notaries was approved in Georgia on October 6, 2011. The document is the first code of ethics in notary history. It determines the general principles of professional ethics and moral standards for notaries, which guide their relations with the general public, as well as state bodies and colleagues.

== Services of the Notary Chamber ==
Services of the Notary Chamber

In the Notary Chamber, one may access the notary archives. Archives of notary documents maintained by the notaries with terminated authority or deceased notaries are kept in the archives of the Notary Chamber and certified copies of such documents may be issued. Accelerated services were also introduced in the archives of the Notary Chamber. Since 2011 one may enjoy the services of the archive of the Notary Chamber at the Houses of Justice and notary offices as well.

== Notary service ==
Notary certified documents have unquestionable probative force. Principal notary acts are as follows:

- Certification of deals (mortgage, purchase, etc.);
- Issuing of ownership certificates;
- Certification of Powers of Attorney;
- Certification of conformity of copy with its original document or extract;
- Certification of genuineness of the signature being executed on the document;
- Certification of accuracy of translation from one language to another;
- Certification of time of submission of a document;
- Taking money, securities and values on deposit;
- Issuing a writ of execution;
- Registering entries on ownership right on property, amendment in the right and/or termination of the right and issuing relevant extracts;
- Registering marriage or dissolution of marriage;
- Enjoying the right to publicly offer a thing...

In 2011 notaries acting within Georgian territory have performed 1 413 668 notary acts. 25 628 of which were certified on-line; In 2012, 19 103 of which were certified on-line. Georgia is the first country worldwide where notary acts are performed via the internet. In 2011, 1,271 writs of execution were issued. A Notary issues a writ of execution on the basis of any deal associated with monetary liabilities. In 2012, 1,278 writs of execution were issued.

== Sources ==
- Georgia Law, about notary”

== Resources in internet ==
Official website of the Notary Chamber of Georgia
