= Alexandre Tsutsunava =

Georgian director

Alexandre Tsutsunava ალექსანდრე წუწუნავა
- Born: Alexandre Tsutsunava; 28 January 1881; Likhauri, Kutais Governorate, Russian Empire, today Georgia,
- Died: 25 October 1955 (aged 74)
- Occupation: Film director

Alexandre Tsutsunava (Georgian: ალექსანდრე წუწუნავა; born 28 January [O.S. 16 January] 1881 – 25 October 1955) was a Georgian theatre and film director.

His film Christine, based on a story by Egnate Ninoshvili, (Georgian: ქრისტინე) was the first Georgian feature film. His other films include Who is the Guilty?.

The Alexandre Tsutsunava Ozurgeti Drama Theatre, inaugurated in 1961 in Georgia, was named after him. In December 2017, the Gosfilmofond of Russia returned the original film Who is the Guilty? to Georgia following a 2014 deal between Russia and Georgia. By 2026, the Georgian National Film Center has fully restored Tsutsunava's films Who Is Guilty? (1925), Two Hunters (1927), and Uprising in Guria (1929).

== Filmography ==
As director

- Janki guriashi (1928)
- Khanuma (1926)
- Ori monadire (1927)
- Vin aris damnashave ? (1925)
- Qristine (1918)
- Berikaoba-Keenoba (1909)

As writer

- Janki guriashi (1928)
- Khanuma (1926)
- Ori monadire (1927)
- Vin aris damnashave ? (1925)
- Qristine (1918)
