= Shalva Dadiani =

Georgian novelist, playwright, and actor

- შალვა დადიანი
- Shalva Dadiani in 1920
- Born: May 21, 1874; Zestaponi, Kutaisi Governorate, Russian Empire
- Died: March 15, 1959 (aged 84)
- Occupations: Novelist, playwright, and actor
- Spouse: Princess Elena Andronikashvili
- Parents: Prince Nikolaoz Dadiani (father); Princess Lydia Tsulukidze (mother)

Shalva Dadiani (Georgian: შალვა დადიანი; May 21, 1874 – March 15, 1959) was a Georgian novelist, playwright, and actor.

Born in Zestaponi, western Georgia (then Kutais Governorate of Russian Empire), into the family of a writer and translator Prince Nikolaoz Dadiani (1844-1896), a member of the Dadiani noble family, and his wife, Princess Lydia Tsulukidze. He had a sister, Princess Mariam Dadani (1870-1958).

He was a writer, playwright, producer and fiction writer. He was also an actor, theatre-goer, publicist, politician and public figure.

He married Princess Elena Andronikashvili (1879-1956).

His first collection of poems appeared in 1892, followed by a series of short stories published in the magazine Iveria in the late 1890s. Dadiani began his theatrical career in 1893 and quickly became a close collaborator of Lado Aleksi-Meskhishvili at the Kutaisi Theatre. In 1908, he formed Modzravi Dasi (“Mobile Troupe”), a peripatetic theatre of revolutionary propaganda, which toured in various cities of Georgia, as well as Baku and Novorossiysk, and staged, among others, Maxim Gorky’s The Last, a play censored by the Russian authorities. Dadiani, as a playwright, emerged during the 1905 Russian Revolution, heavily influenced by the works of Gorky. At the same time, Dadiani engaged in historical prose in the patriotic traditions of Vasil Barnovi, and authored the memorable George the Rus (გიორგი რუსი; 1916–26), dedicated to Yury Bogolyubsky, the dishonored and ousted 12th-century Rus' consort of Georgia. After the establishment of Soviet rule in Georgia (1921), Dadiani’s works were either tacitly hostile to the new regime, or remained apolitical. However, Dadiani never let his narrative ingenuity endanger his future by oppositionist writings, and his later novels and plays glorified Soviet premier Joseph Stalin.

He joined the Communist Party later in his life (1945) and was elected to the Supreme Soviet of the Soviet Union. He became People's Artist of the Georgian SSR in 1923, and was decorated with a number of Soviet awards, including the Order of Lenin. He died in Tbilisi.

Chairman of the Georgian Actors Union and the Georgian Theatrical Society (1950-1959).

== Selected filmography ==
- The Exile (1922); actor, screenwriter
- Before the Hurricane (1924); screenwriter
