= Vladimir Barsky =

Russian film director and screenwriter (1866–1936)

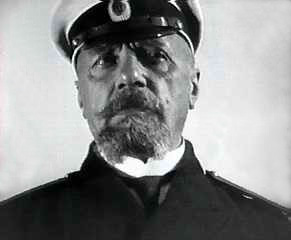
- Born: Vladimir Gregoryevich Barsky; 15 March 1866; Moscow, Russian Empire
- Died: 24 January 1936 (aged 69); Moscow, USSR
- Resting place: Donskoy Cemetery
- Occupations: Film director, screenwriter, actor
- Years active: 1892–1935

Vladimir Gregoryevich "Goskino" Barsky (Russian: Владимир Григорьевич Барский; 15 March 1866 – 24 January 1936) was a Russian and Soviet film director, screenwriter, actor and author of articles about theatre.

Barsky also took part in the formation of the Turkmen and Uzbek cinematography.

== Life and career ==
Barsky was born in 1866 in Moscow to a Russian family. He graduated from the Moscow real school (1885) and Imperial Moscow Technical School.

He started directing and acting in 1892 in a number of theaters. In 1899–1917, he worked as a director and actor of a drama theater in Ivanovo. In 1917–1921, he worked in the People's House in Tbilisi.

From 1921 to 1928 he was a director of the State Committee for Industry of Georgia, After 1928, he worked at film studios Sovkino, Mezhrabpomfilm, Uzbekkino, and Turkmenfilm.

Barsky died in Moscow on 24 January 1936, at the age of 69. He was buried at Donskoy Cemetery in the city.

== Creativity ==
Together with the scriptwriter G. Arustanov he worked on a series of films under the general title "Iron penal servitude", which were supposed to show the revolutionary past of Georgia. Two films were made: Nightmares of the Past (1925), which tells about the events of 1905 in Georgia, and At the Cost of Thousands (1925), which is about the events of 1916–1917 in Georgia.

== Partial filmography ==
=== Actor ===
- Battleship Potemkin - Golikov, commander
- The Ninth Wave - Officer
- Clockwork Bug - Jean, hairdresser, he's Uncle Vanya
- Merchants of Glory - Major Blanchard, in the credits as G. Barsky
- Shakir - Colonist
- Nastenka Ustinova - Sudarikov
- Pepo - Judge

=== Director ===
- Decapitated Corpse
- Tell me why?
- Fire Worshipers
- Do Not Sleep
- Exile
- Rogue Arsen
- Iron Hard Labor
- Nightmares of the Past
- Lighthouse Mystery
- Costing Thousands
- The Ninth Wave
- Princess Mary
- Bela
- Maksim Maksimych
- Cossacks
- Gul and Tolmaz (not completed)

=== Screenwriter ===
- Tell Me Why?
- Do Not Sleep
- Fire Worshipers
- Rogue Arsen
- The Mystery of the Lighthouse
- Princess Mary
- Bela
- Maxim Maksimych
- Cossacks
