= List of Soviet films of 1926 =

A list of films produced in the Soviet Union in 1926 (see 1926 in film).

== 1926 ==
Title	Russian title	Director	Cast	Genre	Notes
1926
Abrek Zaur	Абрек Заур	Boris Mikhin	Vladimir Bestaev, Aleksandre Takaishvili, N. Aganbekova, N. Gantarina, Nikoloz Sanishvili	Drama	
The Bay of Death	Бухта смерти	Abram Room	Nikolai Saltykov	Drama	
Benya Krik	Беня Крик	Vladimir Vilner	Matvei Lyarov, Yuri Shumsky, Nikolai Nademsky	Drama	
By the Law	По закону	Lev Kuleshov	Aleksandra Khokhlova, Sergey Komarov, Vladimir Fogel	Drama	
The Crime of Shirvanskaya	Преступление княжны Ширванской	Ivane Perestiani	Maria Shirai	Adventure	
The Decembrists	Декабристы	Aleksandr Ivanovsky	Vladimir Maksimov	Drama	
The Devil's Wheel	Чёртово колесо	Grigori Kozintsev, Leonid Trauberg	Pyotr Sobolevsky, Sergei Gerasimov, Sergei Martinson, Andrei Kostrichkin	Crime	
Ilan-dili	Иллан Дилли	Ivane Perestiani	Sofia Jozeffi	Adventure	
Kashtanka	Каштанка	Olga Preobrazhenskaya			
Katka's Reinette Apples	Катька бумажный ранет	Fridrikh Ermler, Eduard Ioganson	Veronika Buzhinskaya	Drama	
Love's Berries	Ягодка Любви	Alexander Dovzhenko	Margarita Chardynina-Barska	Comedy	
Mechanics of the Brain	Механика головного мозга	Vsevolod Pudovkin		Documentary	
Miss Mend	Мисс Менд	Boris Barnet	Igor Ilyinsky	Spy film	
Mother	Мать	Vsevolod Pudovkin	Vera Baranovskaya	Drama/propaganda	Ukraine SSR
Prostitute	Проститутка	Oleg Frelikh	Olga Bonus	Drama	
Tale of the Woods	Лесная быль	Yuri Tarich	Leonid Danilov		
The Neglected Sportsman	Беспризорный спортсмен	Nikolai Bogdanov, Nikolai Bravko	Lev Konstantinovsky, L. Efremova, Vladislav Tarasov	Comedy, short	Partially lost film
The Overcoat	Шинель	Grigori Kozintsev, Leonid Trauberg	Andrei Kostrichkin, Aleksei Kapler, Boris Shpis, Pyotr Sobolevsky, Yanina Zhejmo	Drama	
P.K.P. (Pilsudski Bought Petliura)	«П.К.П.» («Пилсудский купил Петлюру»)	Georgi Stabovoi	Matvei Lyarov, Yuri Tyutynik, Natalia Uzhviy, Sergei Kalinin	History, biopic	
The Punishment of Shirvanskaya	Наказание княжны Ширванской	Ivane Perestiani	Maria Shirai	Adventure	
Savur-Mohyla	Савур-могила	Ivane Perestiani	Pavel Yesikovsky	Adventure	
Shor and Shorshor	Шор и Шоршор	Hamo Beknazarian	Hambartsum Khachanyan, A. Amirbekyan, Nina Manucharyan	Comedy	
Spartacus	Спартак	Muhsin Ertuğrul	Nikolai Deinar, Matvei Lyarov, A. Simonov	Drama	
A Sixth Part of the World	Шестая часть мира	Dziga Vertov		Documentary	
The Song on the Rock	Песнь на камне	Leo Moor		Drama, history	
The Three Million Trial	Процесс о трех миллионах	Yakov Protazanov	Igor Ilyinsky, Anatoli Ktorov, Mikhail Klimov, Olga Zhiznyeva	Comedy	
The Trypillia Tragedy	Трипольская трагедия	Alexander Dmitrievich, Anoschenko-Anod	Evgeniya Petrova, Boris Bezgin, Vera Danilevich	Drama	
Volga rebels	Волжские бунтари	Paul Petrov-Bytov	S. Galich		Lost film
The Wind	Ветер	Cheslav Sabinsky, Lev Sheffer	Nikolai Saltykov	Romantic drama	
The Wings of a Serf	Крылья холопа	Yuri Tarich	Leonid Leonidov	History, drama	

== See also ==
- 1926 in the Soviet Union
