= List of Soviet films of 1923 =

A list of films produced in the Soviet Union in 1923 (see 1923 in film).

== 1923 ==
Title	Original title	Director	Cast	Genre	Notes
Arsena, the Brigand	Arsena Kachagi (Разбойник Арсен)	Vladimir Barsky	Nato Vachnadze	Action	
Brigade Commander Ivanov	Комбриг Иванов	Aleksandr Razumny	Mariya Blyumental-Tamarina	Comedy	
Comedienne	Комедиантка	Aleksandr Ivanovsky	Yekaterina Korchagina-Aleksandrovskaya, Nina Shaternikova	Drama	
The Fight for the Ultimatum Factory	Борьба за Ультиматум	Dmitri Bassalygo	Vasiliy Aristov	Adventure	
Glumov's Diary	Дневник Глумова	Sergei Eisenstein	Grigori Aleksandrov, Aleksandr Antonov, Sergei M. Eisenstein	Short film	
The Gribushin Family	Семья Грибушиных	Aleksandr Razumny		Drama	
In the Pillory	Mamis mkvleli (У позорного столба)	Hamo Beknazarian			
Kino-Pravda vol. 14-17	Кино-правда	Dziga Vertov		Newsreel	
The Last Stake of Mr. Enniock	Последняя ставка мистера Энниока	Vladimir Gardin			Lost film
Locksmith and Chancellor	Слесарь и Канцлер	Vladimir Gardin	Ivan Khudoleyev		
Man Is Man's Enemy	Katsi katsistvis mgelia (Человек человеку волк)	Ivan Perestiani	Vladimir Maksimov, T. Maqsimova, Ivane Perestiani, V. Djamgarova	Adventure	
Red Devils	Tsiteli eshmakunebi (Красные дьяволята)	Ivan Perestiani	Konstantin Davidovski	Adventure	
A Spectre Haunts Europe	Призрак бродит по Европе	Vladimir Gardin	Zoya Barantsevich	Horror	
Waifs and Strays	Беспризорные	Vladimir Karin	Vladimir Aristov	Drama	

== See also ==
- 1923 in the Soviet Union
