= PKP =

PKP may stand for:

== Organizations ==
- Partido Komunista ng Pilipinas-1930, original Filipino communist party
- Communist Party of the Philippines (Filipino: Partido Komunista ng Pilipinas), underground Filipino Maoist party
- Phi Kappa Phi (ΦΚΦ), oldest all-discipline honor society in the United States
- Phi Kappa Psi (ΦΚΨ), American social fraternity
- Pi Kappa Phi (ΠΚΦ), U.S. social fraternity
- Polish State Railways (Polish: Polskie Koleje Państwowe), dominant rail operator of Poland
- Political Consultative Committee (Polish: Polityczny Komitet Porozumiewawczy), a World War II Polish political organization
- Polish Auxiliary Corps (Polish: Polski Korpus Posiłkowy), a 1916–1918 Polish military formation in the Austro-Hungarian Army
- Transnistrian Communist Party (Russian: Приднестровская коммунистическая партия, romanized: Pridnestrovskaya kommunisticheskaya partiya; abbreviated: Russian: ПΚП, romanized: PKP)
- Public Knowledge Project, non-profit research initiative
- Mountain Air Express (ICAO airline code PKP), U.S. airline

== Objects ==
- PKP "Pecheneg", Russian machine gun
- Purple-K, fire-extinguishing agent

== Arts, entertainment, media ==
- Pyaar Ka Punchnama, a 2011 Indian film
- P.K.P. (Pilsudski Bought Petliura), 1926 Soviet film

== Other uses ==
- Puka-Puka Airport (IATA airport code PKP), Puka-Puka, French Polynesia
- Pukapukan language (ISO 639 language code pkp), a Polynesian language found on Pukapuka, Cook Islands
- Pierre Karl Péladeau (born 1961), former leader of the Parti Québécois and largest shareholder in Quebecor Inc.
- 2020 Malaysia movement control order (Malay: Perintah Kawalan Pergerakan 2020), a partial lockdown order
- Pembroke-King's Programme, study abroad programme in Pembroke College in the University of Cambridge
