= Comrade Abram =

- Russian: Товарищ Абрам
- Directed by: Aleksandr Razumny
- Written by: Feofan Shipulinsky
- Starring: Pyotr Baksheyev; Dimitri Buchowetzki; Vera Orlova; Polikarp Pavlov
- Release date: 1919
- Country: Russian Empire
- Language: Russian

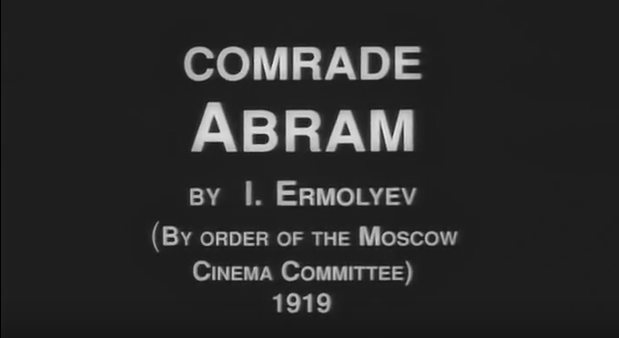
USSR movie "Comrade Abram", 1919.

Comrade Abram (Russian: Товарищ Абрам) is a 1919 silent film directed by Aleksandr Razumny.

== Plot ==
The film tells about a young man Abram Hersh, who takes a job at the plant, becomes an activist and grows up in the commissioner of the Soviet Army.

== Starring ==
- Pyotr Baksheyev
- Dimitri Buchowetzki
- Vera Orlova
- Polikarp Pavlov
