= Red Devils (film) =

1923 film

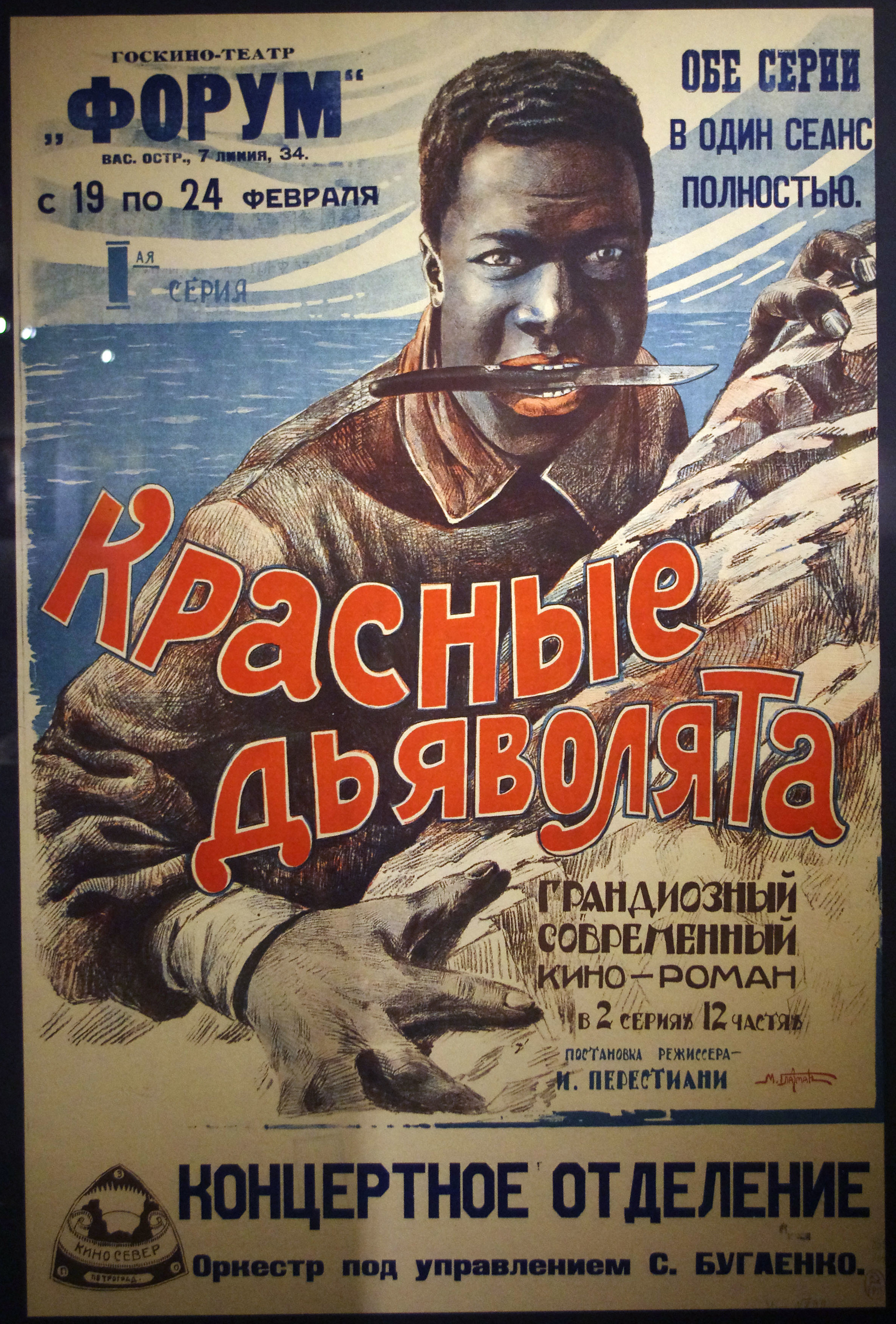
- Directed by: Ivan Perestiani; Pavel Blyakhin
- Written by: Ivan Perestiani; Pavel Blyakhin
- Starring: Pavel Yesikovsky; Sofia Josephey; Kador Ben-Salim; Vladimir Kucherenko
- Cinematography: Aleksander Digmelov
- Music by: I. Gokieli
- Production companies: Cinema section of People's Commissariat of Georgia; Odessa Film Studio
- Release date: 1923
- Running time: 84 minutes
- Country: Soviet Union
- Language: Russian

Red Devils (Russian: Красные дьяволята, romanized: Krasnye dyavolyata) is a 1923 Soviet adventure film directed by Ivan Perestiani based on the eponymous story by Pavel Blyakhin. The story follows three daredevils who volunteer as scouts for the Red Cavalry during the Soviet fight against the forces of Ukrainian anarchist revolutionary Nestor Makhno during the Russian Civil War. It has become one of the most famous and oft-quoted works of the Soviet adventure film.

== Plot ==
Red Devils (1923)

In the midst of the Russian Civil War, bandits under Nestor Makhno raid a train depot in the Crimea occupied by the Red Army. During the raid, train mechanic Petrov is killed, leaving behind his orphaned children Misha and Dunyasha. Swearing revenge, the siblings manage to escape. Reaching a nearby circus, the pair eventually save Tom Jackson, a black American sailor turned acrobat, from being abused by his managers. The trio then meet up with Marshal Semyon Budyonny, who recruits them into the Red Army as scouts. Misha and Dunyasha take up the aliases of "Pathfinder" and "The Gadfly" in honor of their literary heroes.

Eventually, Dunyasha manages to infiltrate Makhno’s camp and steals the bandit leader’s papers. She manages to pass them on to Mishka and Tom, though she ends up being separated from the two after Makhno’s men catch up to them. Dunyasha is wounded and is captured, while Mishka is beaten and left for dead. Tom, having held on to the papers, saves Mishka. Meanwhile, Dunyasha is taken to a mill and nursed back to health by Oksana, the miller’s daughter. However, her mother hands Dunyasha back to Makhno, who then has Dunyasha tortured for information. Meanwhile, Mishka and Tom pass the papers on to Budyonny, before rescuing Dunyasha from a hanging.

Thanks to the trio’s intelligence, the Red Army manages to foil Makhno’s attempted attack on an armored train carrying Vladimir Lenin. Driven back to their hideout, Budyonny launches a counterattack against Makhno and forces him to retreat. During the pursuit, Mishka overextends himself in an attempt to capture Makhno and becomes his prisoner. He eventually manages to escape after fighting off Makhno’s toughest fighter and reunites with Dunyasha and Tom. After Mishka recounts his ordeal, the trio decide to capture Makhno and end his reign of terror.

The trio find Makhno staying at the mill. They attempt to capture him with a burlap sack after he tries to rape Oksana after her mother allows it in exchange for payment. After fighting off Oksana's mother, the trio, with Oksana's help, finally capture Makhno. They then bring the bandit leader to Budonny, who awards the trio the Order of the Red Banner, and lauds them as heroes.

== Cast ==
- Pavel Yesikovsky as Misha
- Sofia Josephey as Dunyasha, Misha's sister
- Kador Ben-Salim as Tom Jackson
- Vladimir Kucherenko (credited as Vladimir Sutyrin) as Makhno
- Konstantin Davidovsky as Budyonny
- G. Lane as Petrov, train mechanic, father of Misha and Dunyashi
- Nikolay Nirov as Garbuzenko
- Svetlana Lux as Oksana
- Jan Burinsky as captain
- Zakariy Berishvili as bandit
- Georgiy Makarov we bandit
- Patwakan Barkhudaryan as bandit

== Sequels ==
- The Savur-Mohyla (1926)
- The Crime of Shirvanskaya (1926)
- The Punishment of Shirvanskaya (1926)
- Ilan-dili (1926)
