= Mikhail Rostovtsev (actor) =

Russian actor and singer (1872–1948)

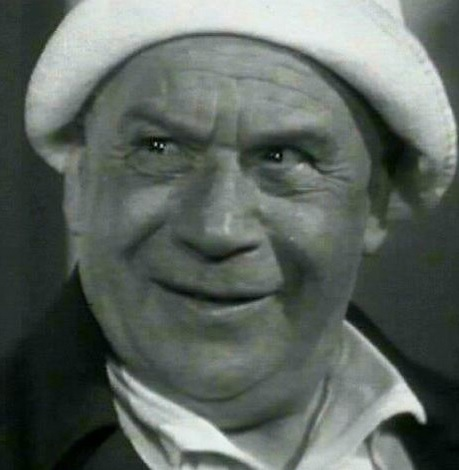
- Rostovtsev in 1936
- Born: October 22, 1872
- Died: April 19, 1948 (aged 75)

Mikhail Antonovich Rostovtsev (Russian: Михаил Антонович Ростовцев; real name Mendel Leibovich Ershler, Russian: Мендель Лейбович Эршлер; 22 October 1872, Taganrog – 19 April 1948, Moscow) was a Russian and Soviet bass, opera and operetta singer and actor. He was made an Honored Artist of the Republic (1927) and an Honored Art Worker of the RSFSR (1936).

== Life ==
He was the eighteenth child of a Jewish watchmaker and from 1881 onward lived and went to school in Rostov-on-Don. He sang in the Lyubetskii (Rostov-on-Don) synagogue choir for nine years and from 1884 onward was an opera dancer.

He joined various popular music ensembles from 1888 onward before taking the stage name Protsenko. From 1890 to 1894 he performed in the Ukrainian troupes led by Derkach and Kropyvnytskyi. He later appeared in Kharkiv, from 1897 in Moscow and from 1900 in Saint Petersburg. He also set up his own troupe, which toured the Russian Empire. He made his operetta debut in 1901 with the stage name Rostovtsev. Up until 1919, he appeared in major operetta ensembles in Vladivostok, Moscow and Saint Petersburg as well as singing in cabarets.

From 1923 onwards he performed at the Maly Petrograd State Academic Theatre (MALEGOT) and GATOB, where he was a master in musical comedy and improvisation. He also appeared in several films such as His Excellency (1928), Lieutenant Kijé (1934), Late for a Date (1936) (all produced by Belgoskino), In the Name of Life (1947) and Cinderella (1947) and served with hospital and fighting units during World War II.

In a theater in Moscow Rostovtsev played the lead role in the play titled "Jesus in fur". His role had him reading two verses of Jesus from the Sermon on the Mount in the Gospel of Matthew from the New Testament of the Bible, toss the Bible, and then say “I’d rather be rich than blessed. Just give me my fur coat and hat.” Despite the prompter telling him to stop, Rostovtsev read the whole sermon and then stopped. After making the sign of the cross, he said "Lord, remember me when thou comest into thy Kingdom." (Luke 23:42), and left the stage. The Communists disposed of him thereafter.
