= Kador Ben-Salim =

Senegalese-Soviet actor

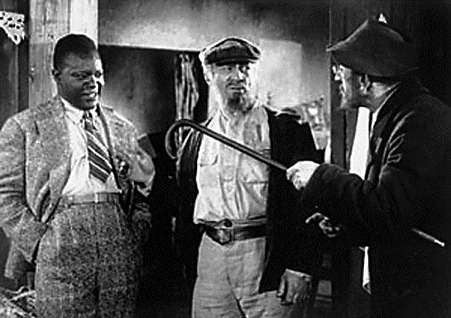
- Ben-Salim, at left, in The Return of Nathan Becker (1932)
- Born: 1890s?
- Died: 1940s?
- Known for: Acting

Kador Ben-Salim (Russian: Кадор Бен-Салим) was a Senegalese-Soviet acrobat, Red Army soldier and most likely the only actor of African descent in Soviet film throughout the 1920s and early 1930s. A veteran of the Russian Civil War, he appeared in at least eight films, including The Return of Nathan Becker, the first ever Yiddish-language sound film.

== Biography ==
Ben-Salim was an acrobat in a touring Moroccan troupe that arrived in Moscow in 1912. By 1916, he had made his way to Almaty and joined a circus troupe run by Alexander Sosin (the first person to do a front double somersault). Following the Russian Revolution and the start of the civil war, he joined the Red Army and served in one of the international cavalry units under the divisional command of Vasily Chapayev.

== Filmography ==
Year	Title	Role	Director(s)	Notes	Refs.
1923	Red Devils	Tom Jackson	Ivan Perestiani		
1926	Savur-Mohyla	Tom Jackson	Ivan Perestiani	Sequel to Red Devils	
1926	The Crime of Shirvanskaya	Tom Jackson	Ivan Perestiani	Sequel to Savur-Mohyla	
1926	The Punishment of Shirvanskaya	Tom Jackson	Ivan Perestiani	Sequel to The Crime of Shirvanskaya	
1926	Ilan-dili	Tom Jackson	Ivan Perestiani	Sequel to The Punishment of Shirvanskaya	
1927	Mr Lloyd's Voyage	Footman	Dmitri Bassalygo		
1931	Black Skin	Tom	Pavel Kolomoitsev		
1932	The Return of Nathan Becker	Jim	Rachel Milman-Creamer, Boris Shpis		
