= Vera Orlova =

Vera Orlova may refer to:

- Vera Georgiyevna Orlova (1894–1977), Russian actress
- Vera Markovna Orlova (1918–1993), Russian actress
