= The Return of Nathan Becker =

1932 film

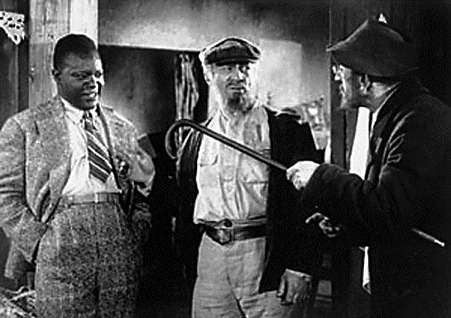
- Russian: Возвращение Нейтана Беккера
- Directed by: Rachel Milman-Creamer; Boris Shpis
- Written by: Rachel Milman-Creamer; Boris Shpis
- Starring: David Gutman; Solomon Mikhoels; Yelena Kashnitskaya; Kador Ben-Salim; Boris Babochkin; Anna Zarzhitskaya
- Cinematography: Yevgeni Mikhajlov
- Music by: Yevgeni Brusilovsky
- Production company: Belgoskino
- Release date: 1932
- Country: Soviet Union
- Languages: Russian, Yiddish

The Return of Nathan Becker (Russian: Возвращение Нейтана Беккера, romanized: Vozvrashchenie Neytana Bekkera) is a 1932 Soviet drama film directed and written by Rachel Milman-Creamer and Boris Shpis. It is a Soviet film telling the story of a Jew who returns after 28 years in America. A bricklayer by trade, he ends up in a contest with his Soviet counterpart. Becker loses, but learns more about the “warm and welcoming” way of life in the Soviet Union. Notable mostly for the performance of Solomon Mikhoels, one of the leading lights of Moscow State Jewish Theatre, and for being the only Soviet film ever shot in both Russian and Yiddish.

== Plot ==
After 28 years in America, Nathan Becker (David Gutman) comes to his former homeland, now the U.S.S.R., not knowing what to do. He brings with him his wife (Yelena Kashnitskaya) and a black friend, Jim, (Senegalese actor Kador Ben-Salim). Becker’s father (Solomon Michoels), has become an enthusiastic supporter of the Soviet Union. Still, when he first meets Becker’s friend. The film takes place during the time of the first Five-Year Plan, which was an attempt to increase productivity in the Soviet Union. The construction of the city of Magnitogorsk is under way, and Becker gets a chance to work as a bricklayer. He scoffs at the way his Soviet counterparts lay bricks. “Soviet workers exercise before their working shifts. Bekker (sic) ridicules this idea: these are ballet dancers, not workers, he says.” Becker then challenges his Soviet counterpart to a contest which sets the mechanical American way of bricklaying against the Soviet method. “…the superior care given to the individual by state triumphs over mere mechanical efficiency.” Becker assumes when he loses that he will also lose his job and have to go home. But they ask him to stay, noting that they can learn “by adding his technical knowledge to their greater basic wisdom.”

== Significance ==
The Return of Nathan Becker is “the only Soviet sound film made in Yiddish.” Peter Kenez wrote that the film “deserves detailed discussion because it is the best known of the [Soviet] Jewish films.

The New York Times liked the film for some of the things that were not central to the plot. “In the screen telling of this simple tale the directors have presented many highly entertaining incidents of Jewish life in the Russia of today and have refrained from dwelling too much upon the building activities. The acting of the principals is excellent. A feature of the film is the humming and singing of Yiddish folk songs, especially by Mrs. Becker, who to the very end has only a hazy conception of the new Russia.“

The beginning of the film was shot in the Jewish quarter of Vinnitsya, which had a typical shtetl outlook.

== Cast ==
- David Gutman as Neitan Bekker
- Solomon Mikhoels as Tsele Bekker
- Yelena Kashnitskaya as Majke Bekker
- Kador Ben-Salim as Jim
- Boris Babochkin as Mikulich
- Anna Zarzhitskaya as Nata
