= Satan Triumphant =

- Directed by: Yakov Protazanov
- Written by: Olga Blazhevich
- Produced by: Joseph N. Ermolieff (as Iosif Yermolyev)
- Starring: Pavel Pavlov; Ivan Mozzhukhin
- Cinematography: Fédote Bourgasoff (as Fyodor Burgasov)
- Production company: Yermoliev
- Release date: 21 October 1917
- Country: Russian Empire
- Languages: Silent film Russian intertitles

Part 1

Part 2

Satan Triumphant (Russian: Сатана ликующий, romanized: Satana likuyushchiy) is a 1917 silent film in Russian directed by Yakov Protazanov.

The film has not survived in its entirety; the endings of both episodes are missing.

Some of the film's inscriptions were lost. They were restored thanks to the help of Rolf Lindfors, the Curator of the Swedish Film Archives, who found the film's inscriptions in the Swedish Film Censorship Archive.

It also became known that in 1919 the film was forbidden by the Swedish censorship to be shown in the country.

== Plot ==
Pastor Talnoх furiously urges the flock to fight temptations, but he himself becomes a victim of temptation. In his house appears Satan, pushing the hero to theft and spiritual fall.

== Cast (in credits order) ==
- Pavel Pavlov as Pavel, painter, hunchback
- Aleksandr Chabrov as Satan
- Natalya Lisenko as Esther, Sandro's mother
- Ivan Mozzhukhin as Pastor Talnoх and his son Sandro van Gauguin
- Vera Orlova as Inga

== See also ==
- Deals with the Devil in popular culture
