= Nest of Wasps =

1927 film

- Directed by: Ivane Perestiani
- Written by: Ivane Perestiani
- Cinematography: Aleksandre Digmelovi
- Production company: Sakhkinmretsvi
- Release date: 1927
- Running time: 73 minutes
- Country: Soviet Union
- Languages: Silent; Georgian intertitles

Nest of Wasps (Georgian:Krazanas bude) is a 1927 Soviet silent film directed by Ivane Perestiani.

The film's sets were designed by the art director Valerian Sidamon-Eristavi.

== Cast ==
- Marius Jakobini as Jakob
- Ivan Kruchinin as Menager
- Maria Shirai as Lastochka
- G. Meliava as Lumper proletar
- Pavel Yesikovsky
- Marika Chimishkian as Rika
- N. Qarumidze as Meri
- S. Gubin
- Aleksandr Shirai as Champion
- Arkadi Khintibidze

== Bibliography ==
- Rollberg, Peter. Historical Dictionary of Russian and Soviet Cinema. Scarecrow Press, 2008.
