= Mikhail Verner =

Soviet film director and painter (1881-1941)

Michael Evgenevich Verner (Russian - Михаил Евгеньевич Вернер; 1881–1941) was a Soviet film director and painter, notable as one of the founders and leaders of cinematography in Ukraine. He set his films both before and after the Russian Revolution and his oeuvre is dominated by comedy. He directed Late for a Date for Belgoskino.

== Films ==
- Late for a Date
