= The Power of Darkness (1924 film) =

1924 film

- Directed by: Conrad Wiene
- Written by: Leo Tolstoy (play); Robert Wiene
- Starring: Petr Sharov; Mariya Germanova; Maria Kryshanovskaya
- Cinematography: Willy Goldberger; Ernst Lüttgens
- Music by: Willy Schmidt-Gentner
- Production company: Neumann-Filmproduktion
- Distributed by: Bayerische Film
- Release date: 16 June 1924
- Running time: 72 minutes
- Country: Germany
- Languages: Silent; German intertitles

The Power of Darkness (German:Die Macht der Finsternis) is a 1924 German silent drama film directed by Conrad Wiene and starring Petr Sharov, Mariya Germanova and Maria Kryshanovskaya. It is an adaptation of Leo Tolstoy's play The Power of Darkness.

It was shot at the Bavaria Studios in Munich.

== Cast ==
- Petr Sharov
- Mariya Germanova - Anisia
- Maria Kryshanovskaya - Aniuta
- Alexander Wiruboff - Nikita
- Pavel Pavlov - Akim
- Maria Egorowa - Akulina
- Sergej Kommissarov
- Nikolai Massalitinov
- Vera Orlova
- Vera Pawlowa
- George Seroff

== Bibliography ==
- Jung, Uli & Schatzberg, Walter. Beyond Caligari: The Films of Robert Wiene. Berghahn Books, 1999.
