= The Wind (1926 film) =

1926 film

- Directed by: Cheslav Sabinsky; Lev Sheffer
- Written by: Boris Lavrenyev; Abram Room; Nikolai Saltykov
- Cinematography: Vasili Khvatov
- Production company: Sovkino
- Release date: 26 October 1926
- Country: Soviet Union
- Languages: Silent; Russian intertitles

The Wind (Russian: Ветер, romanized: Veter) is a 1926 Soviet silent romantic drama directed by Cheslav Sabinsky and Lev Sheffer.

== Cast ==
- Nikolai Saltykov as Vasilii Guliavin - Army officer
- Oksana Podlesnaya as Lelka the bandit queen
- Natasha Sokolova as Annushka
- Evgenii Nadelin as Mikhail Stroev - Red Army commissar
- Aleksandr Antonov as Sailor
- N. Bobrov as Artillery commander
- Aleksandr Timontayev as Sailor
- Vladimir Uralsky as Sailor

== Bibliography ==
- Christie, Ian & Taylor, Richard. The Film Factory: Russian and Soviet Cinema in Documents 1896-1939. Routledge, 2012.
