= Ilan-dili =

1926 film

- Directed by: Ivane Perestiani
- Cinematography: Aleksandre Digmelovi
- Production company: Sakhkinmretsvi
- Release date: 31 December 1926
- Running time: 80 minutes
- Country: Soviet Union
- Languages: Silent; Georgian intertitles

Ilan-dili is a 1926 Soviet silent action adventure film directed by Ivane Perestiani. It is the sequel to the film The Savur Grave.

== Plot ==
After completing their service in the Red Army, the "Red Devils" — Misha, Tom, and Dunyasha — along with the miller’s daughter Oksana, find work in a laboratory at an oil industry facility in Baku. Throughout the film, several sequences delve into the origins of oil, its chemical composition, and related scientific details.

Dunyasha and Oksana meet the wives in the harem of a swindler named Usseynov and persuade them to leave him to build independent lives in the Soviet state. Seeking revenge, Usseynov kidnaps Dunyasha and Oksana, taking them to the uninhabited island of Illan Dilli ("Snake's Sting") near the Turkish border, intending for them to die of hunger and thirst. However, Misha and Tom, with the help of border guards, manage to rescue the girls. Romantic feelings begin to develop, forming two couples: Misha and Oksana, and Tom and Dunyasha. In the final scene, the heroes discuss the names for their newborn children, symbolizing their hopeful future.

== Cast ==
- Sofia Jozeffi as Duniasha
- Pavel Yesikovsky as Misha
- Svetlana Luiks as Oqsana
- Kador Ben-Salim as Tom Jackson
- Marius Jakobini

== Bibliography ==
- Rollberg, Peter. Historical Dictionary of Russian and Soviet Cinema. Scarecrow Press, 2008.
