= The Queen of Spades (1916 film) =

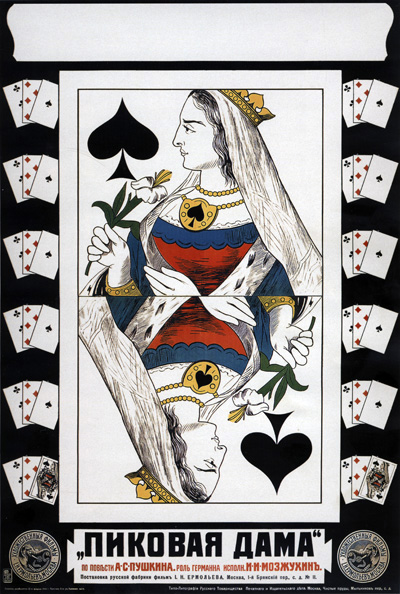
- Directed by: Yakov Protazanov
- Written by: Aleksandr Pushkin; Yakov Protazanov; Fedor Ozep
- Produced by: Joseph N. Ermolieff
- Starring: Ivan Mosjoukine
- Cinematography: Yevgeni Slavinsky
- Music by: Rafal Rozmus
- Release dates: 1 April 1916 (Russian Empire); 18 November 1917 (U.S.)
- Running time: 63 minutes
- Country: Russian Empire
- Languages: Silent film Russian intertitles

The Queen of Spades (Russian: «Пиковая дама», romanized: Pikovaya dama) is a 1916 film adaptation of the 1834 Aleksandr Pushkin short story of the same name. It is noted for its high production values, directorial technique and psychological depth of acting, especially by Ivan Mosjoukine. It is considered to be one of the best pre-revolutionary Russian films.

The film was the second production of the story, the first being the silent short film adaptation of the Pyotr Tchaikovsky opera by Pyotr Chardynin in 1910. Yakov Protazanov uses a wide combination of narrative, staging and camera techniques, many of which were unusual for that time, including retrospection, visions (prototypes of the stream of consciousness), split screen combination shots, flashbacks, jump cuts, deep focus and deep staging, and dissolves.

== Plot ==
The Queen of Spades (1916)

As described in a film magazine, Hermann, a Russian military officer with a limited fortune, is fascinated when he hears the story of Countess Fedotovna, who won her fortune by playing three particular cards, the identity of which she refuses to reveal. Hermann gains entrance to the countess's house through a flirtation with Lizaveta, ward of the countess. He confronts the countess with a revolver and demands to know the cards she played. The countess collapses, dead of fright. Remorseful, Hermann goes home. The next morning he seems to see the phantom of the countess, who tells him that the three cards are the three, the seven, and the ace. The first two nights he plays the three and the seven and is successful. The third night he bets all of his money, feeling sure that the card will be the ace. However, he finds his own card has become the queen of spades and he has lost everything. With the loss of his fortune he also loses his mind.

== Cast ==
- Hermann - Ivan Mosjoukine
- Lizaveta Ivanovna - Vera Orlova
- Countess Anna Fedotovna as an old woman - Yelizaveta Shebueva
- The Countess as a young woman - Tamara Duvan
- Count Fedotovna - Pavel Pavlov
- Count St. Germain - Nikolai Panov

== Home media ==
The film has been released on DVD.

== See also ==
- The Queen of Spades (1960 film)
- The Queen of Spades (1982 film)
- Queen of spades
