= His Excellency (1928 film) =

1928 film

- Directed by: Grigori Roshal
- Written by: Serafima Roshal; Vera Stroyeva
- Starring: Leonid Leonidov; Maria Sinelnikova; Tamara Adelheim; Nikolay Cherkasov; Mikhail Rostovtsev
- Cinematography: Nikolai Kozlovsky
- Edited by: Mark Donskoy
- Production company: Belgoskino
- Release date: 1928
- Running time: 60 minutes
- Country: Soviet Union

His Excellency (Russian: Его превосходительство, romanized: Yego prevoskhoditelstvo) is a 1928 Soviet drama film directed by Grigori Roshal. It was released in the United States under the name, "Seeds of Freedom." The film is based on real events. On 5 May 1902, shoemaker-laborer Hirsh Lekert, a member of the Jewish party Bund, attempted to murder the governor of Vilnius, Victor von Wahl.

== Plot ==
On the eve of 1 May leaflets turn up in the city with the appeal to support the May Day demonstration of Vilnius workers. Cossacks disperse the May Day workers' march killing some and arresting others. Among the dead and arrested are Jewish laborers. Fearing riots, the Jewish bourgeois elite send their representatives to the governor with the request that he punish only the prisoners, and not the rest of the Jewish population. The governor agrees; he orders those who were arrested to be flogged. Hirsh Lekert, a cobbler, is outraged and proposes killing the governor. Despite advice from revolutionary friends (one intertitle states that "six shots do not make a revolution"), he shoots the governor and kills him. Lekert is arrested and sentenced to death.

== Behind the Scenes ==
The film is notable in that star Leonidov played two important roles, Governor Victor von Wahl and the "Old Rabbi." He is both sides of the split face on the poster.

== Cast ==
- Leonid Leonidov as Governor von Wahl and "Old Rabbi"
- Maria Sinelnikova as Miriam, the rabbi's adoptive daughter
- Yuly Untershlak as Hirsch Lekkert
- Tamara Adelheim as Rivele
- Nikolay Cherkasov as the tall clown
- Mikhail Rostovtsev as the short clown
- Abraham Grinfeld as Layser, the rabbi
- A. Nenyukov as Pyotr
- Mariya Dobrova as Circus Star
- Aleksandr Sandel as Factory Owner Spiess
- Igor Doronin
