= Late for a Date =

- Directed by: Mikhail Verner
- Written by: Vasily Lokot
- Starring: Boris Petker; Mikhail Rostovtsev; Mariya Barabanova; Vera Streshneva
- Cinematography: Andrey Bulinskiy
- Music by: Isaac Dunaevsky
- Production company: Belgoskino
- Release date: 23 August 1936
- Running time: 97 minutes
- Country: Soviet Union
- Language: Russian

Late for a Date (Russian: Девушка спешит на свидание, romanized: Devushka speshit na svidanie; literally Girl in a hurry for a date) is a Soviet comedy film directed by Mikhail Verner. A new print was issued in 1987, completely redubbed.

== Plot ==
Moscow, 1936. Leonid Sergeyevich Fyodorov, a modest and intellectual professor, and Nikolai Nikolayevich Gurov, a resourceful cobbler employed by "Moskooppromsoyuza" (referred to later in the film as "Moskunstkozhemobuv"), leave their wives behind in Moscow and travel to the resort town of Yessentuki. Despite being strangers, they share an unexpected connection: both have forgotten their passports. Their wives head to the post office to send the passports, but the postal worker, distracted by a phone conversation about a date, accidentally switches the packages. Gurov receives Fyodorov’s passport, and Fyodorov ends up with Gurov’s.

The passport mix-up sparks a cascade of comedic misunderstandings as the two men navigate life at the resort under false identities. Fyodorov, a reserved academic, finds himself mistaken for a charming cobbler, while Gurov, a crafty ladies' man, is perceived as a dignified professor. Their attempts to adapt to these mistaken identities result in a series of humorous and increasingly chaotic situations.

The confusion is finally resolved with the unexpected arrival of their wives at the resort. With their help, the passport mix-up is clarified, and the two men must confront the absurdity of the roles they inadvertently played during their time at Yessentuki.

== Cast ==
- Boris Petker - Professor Fyodorov
- Mikhail Rostovtsev - Gurov
- Mariya Barabanova - mail delivery girl
- Vera Streshneva - Gurov's wife
- E. Pluta - Fyodorov's wife, Vera
- Alexander Beniaminov - telegraphist
- Andrei Kostrichkin
- Iona Bij-Brodsky - doctor
- Mikhail Rozanov - bootblack
- Arnold Arnold - cameo
- Eugene Golynchik
- Stepan Kayukov - Fyodorov's colleague
- Irina Murzaeva - cameo
- Georgy Georgiu
- Erna Mashkevich - girl
- Petr Hoffmann - cameo
- Andrei Apsolon - cameo

== Sources ==
- Late for a Date on IMDB
- http://tvkultura.ru/brand/show/brand_id/27110/
