= Belarusfilm =

Belarusian film studio

Coordinates: 53°55′39″N 27°37′47″E

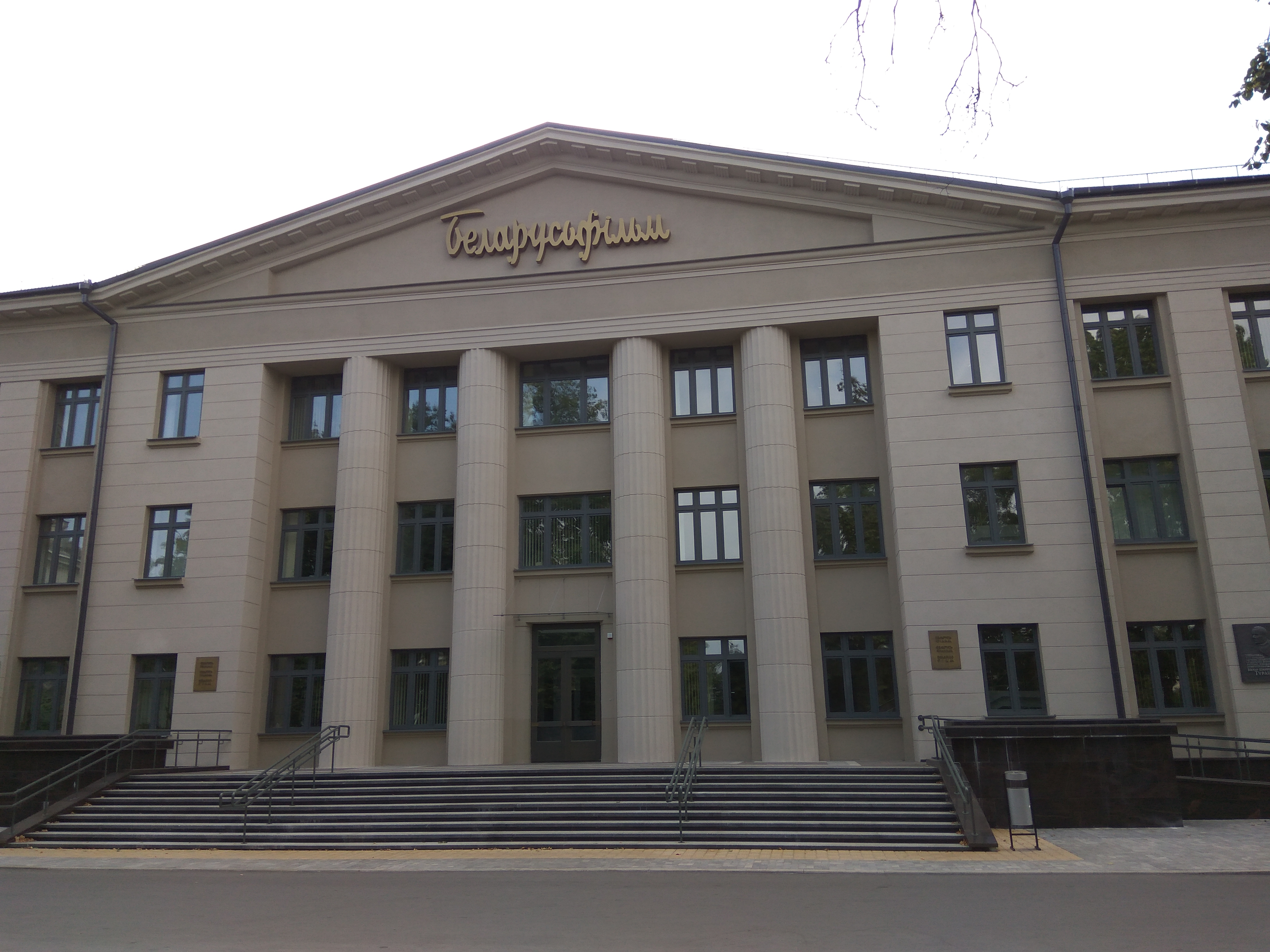
- Belarusfilm main building on Independence Avenue
- Type: Corporation
- Industry: Motion pictures Animated films
- Predecessor: Integralte Pictures
- Founded: 1926; 100 years ago
- Headquarters: Minsk, Belarus
- Products: Motion pictures Animated films

Belarusfilm (Belarusian: Беларусьфільм) is the main film studio of Belarus. It is also the oldest film studio in Belarus.

== History ==
=== Soviet times ===
Belarusfilm, under the name Belgoskino was founded in 1924. The first film shot by Belgoskino was "Forest Story," also known as "Tale of the Woods." Yuri Tarich was the director.

In 1928, the Soviet Belarus studio (Савецкая Беларусь) was founded in Leningrad and moved to Minsk in 1939. Film production was interrupted by World War II, and restarted in 1946, when the studio assumed its current name. After World War II, the studio was dubbed Partizanfilm, due to the large output of films portraying the Soviet partisan's struggle against Nazi occupation.

In Soviet times, the studio was also renowned for its children's films. Its first project was a co-production with Soyuzmultfilm in 1963 – a stop motion feature film called Attention! The Magician is in the City! Consistent animated film production, however, did not begin until 1972. The studio has to date made 131 animated films.

Most of the output has been in Russian rather than Belarusian.

Belarusfilm is also a co-organizer of the Listapad film festival annually held in Minsk, Belarus in November.

Among the early, Soviet-era directors who oversaw films for the studio are: Alexander Faintsimmer, Oleg Frelikh, Vladimir Gardin, Vladimir Korsh-Sablin, Grigori Roshal, Boris Shpis, Yuri Tarich and Mikhail Verner.

=== 2000s ===
In 2012, Sergei Loznitsa’s In the Fog shot jointly with Belarusfilm won the FIPRESCI prize at the 65th Cannes Film Festival. In 2013, Belarusfilm presented 5 shorts at Cannes.

In 2019, a major portion of an Indian movie Squad was shot at Belarusfilm. It is the first Bollywood film to be shot in Belarus. The movie Enemy Lines was also shot in Belarus.

In 2019, Belarusfilm signed a memorandum of long-term cooperation with the Indian Union of Trade and Industry Promotion Organization.

In 2024, the studio announced working on its first 3D animated fantasy film.

== Selected films ==
=== USSR ===
- 1926 Tale of the Woods or Forest Story
- 1927 Prostitute
- 1928 Kastus Kalinovsky
- 1928 His Excellency
- 1929 See You Tomorrow
- 1930 Hatred
- 1930 Sasha
- 1933 The Return of Nathan Becker
- 1933 The First Platoon
- 1934 Lieutenant Kijie
- 1936 Late for a Date
- 1936 Seekers of Happiness
- 1937 Beethoven Concerto
- 1938 The Bear
- 1938 Men of the Sea a.k.a. Baltic Sailors
- 1953 The Skylarks are Singing
- 1959 A Girl Searches for Her Father
- 1972 Fakir Hour
- 1975 The Adventures of Buratino
- 1976 Secret to the Whole World
- 1977 About Red Riding Hood
- 1985 Come and See

=== Belarus ===
- 1993 Az vozdam
- 1993 Me Ivan, You Abraham
- 1997 From Hell to Hell
- 1995 Lato miłosci
- 1997 Zeezicht
- 2003 Anastasia Slutskaya
- 2003 Babiy Yar
- 2003 Chernobyl Heart
- 2004 Dunechka
- 2004 On the Nameless Height
- 2006 Franz + Polina
- 2010 Fortress of War
- 2010 Massacre
- 2012 In the Fog
- 2020 Kupala

== See also ==
- Mosfilm
- Gorky Film Studio
- Lenfilm
- Dovzhenko Film Studios
- Soyuzmultfilm
- Cinema of the Soviet Union
