= Second Winter Campaign =

- Part of the Soviet–Ukrainian War
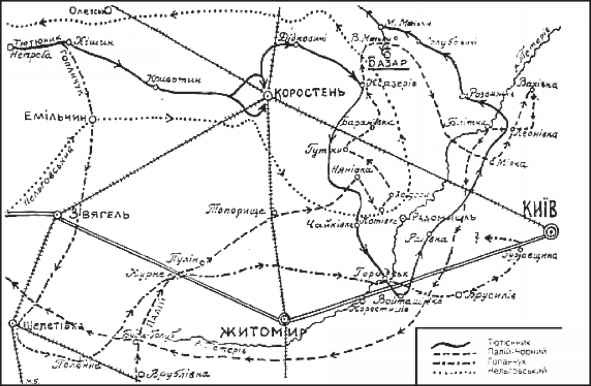
- Advance of the Volyn group of Ukrainian forces on Kyiv (on the right)
Date	October – November 1921
Location	Ukraine
Result	Soviet victory

Belligerents
Ukrainian People's Republic	Soviet Russia; Soviet Ukraine

Commanders and leaders
Yuriy Tyutyunnyk; Mikhailo Paliy-Sidoryanskyi; Andriy Hulyi-Hulenko	Grigory Kotovsky

Units involved
Bessarabian group (up to 300 fighters); Volyn group (up to 900 fighters); Podolian group (342 fighters)	9th Cavalry Division

The Second Winter Campaign was a failed military campaign by the Ukrainian National Army in October and November 1921 against the Bolsheviks. It was the last campaign of the Ukrainian armed forces in post-World War I attempt to achieve independence of Ukraine.

== The plan ==
The plan of the Second Winter Campaign was bold and simple: to move into central Ukraine and unify the various partisan units therein. Since late 1917, there were many independent units working in central Ukraine, including the anarchist Nestor Makhno in the central steppes. Together, the Army of the Ukrainian National Republic would then drive Bolshevik forces from Ukraine.

== Participating units ==
There were three main army groups which took part in the campaign. The main group was known as the Volynhian group, and consisted of 800 men. It was under the command of general Yurii Tiutiunnyk, and the chief of staff was colonel Yurii Otmarshtain. The second group, known as the Podollian group, consisted of 400 men. It was commanded by Lt Col M. Palii and, later, Col S. Chorny. The third group, the Bessarabian group, under the command of general Andrii Huly-Hulenko, was based in Romania.

== The campaign ==
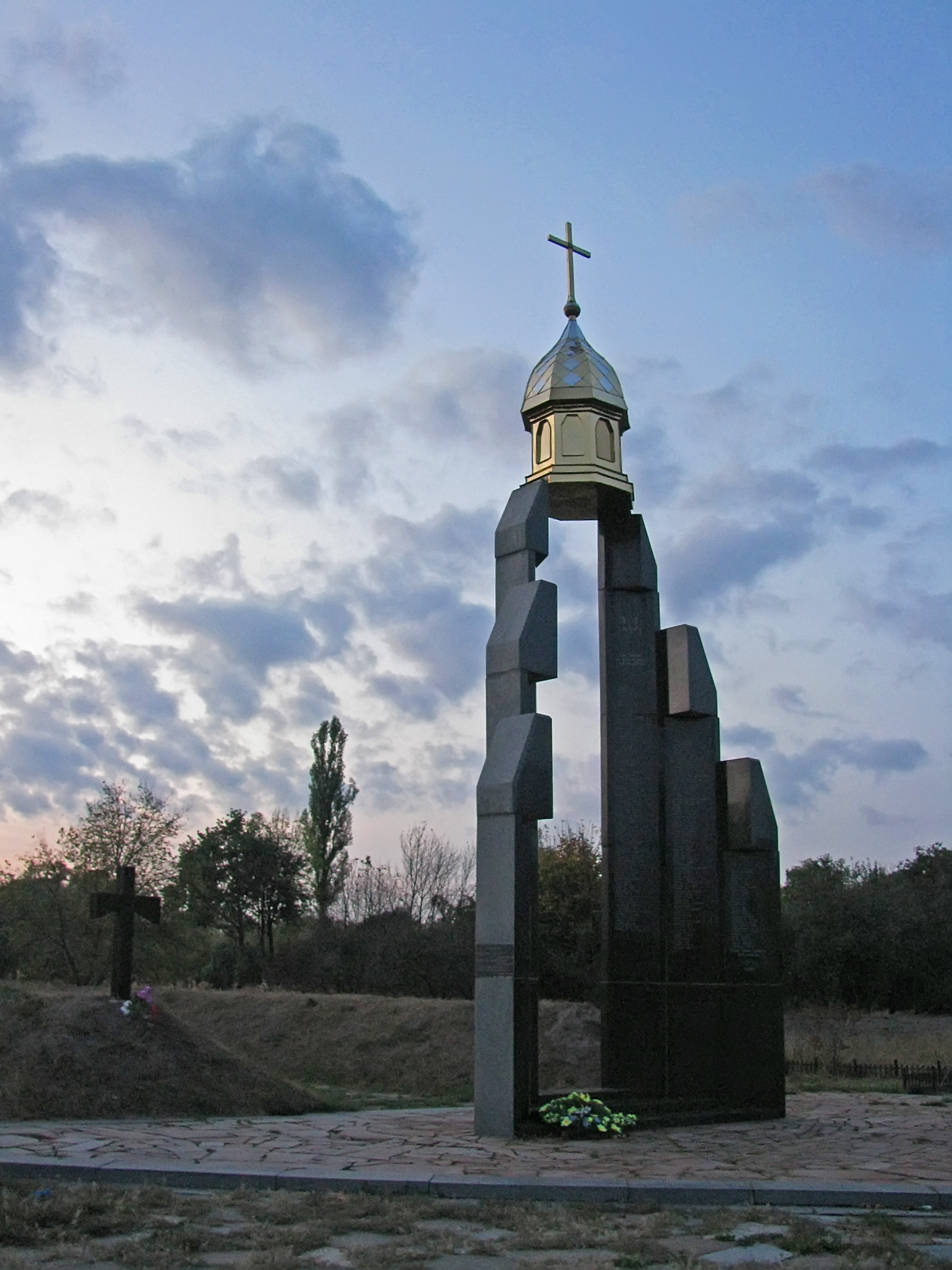
Monument to fallen UNR soldiers in Bazar

The biggest challenge that the campaign faced was lack of coordination of participating units. The plan itself was very bold: to move from bases in Western Ukraine into bolshevik-held central Ukraine and unify many of the partisan units. At the time, Bolshevik units were themselves poorly coordinated. Also, many partisan bands were working throughout Ukraine independently against Bolsheviks. This was especially common in the Zaporozhia region.

All three groups crossed the Soviet border in different places. The first information about the crossing of the border by Ukrainian troops was received by the command of the right-bank group of the Red Army from Kyiv at noon on October 28. At the same time, rumors spread among the population about the large number of Ukrainian forces and the beginning of a mass anti-Bolshevik uprising. Partisan detachments of atamans Khmara, Lytvynchuk, Sviatenko and Orlyk joined the Second Winter Campaign. Simultaneously with the raid groups, the insurgents of the Zabolotny atamans conducted auxiliary actions – in the area of Balta – Olgopil, Shepel - between Bratslav and Vinnytsia, Lykha - near Lipivtsi, Brovy - in the area of Kremenchuk.

=== Bessarabia group ===
Commander - Guliy-Gulenko. Of the three groups, it was the smallest and weakest. The Bessarabia group was active in Ukraine for only a few days, and then returned to Romania.

Bessarabia group was the first to make her way to the Right Bank of Ukraine. The main task of the group is to demonstrate the "main offensive" in the south of Ukraine, to divert the attention of the bolsheviks. The task of the Bessarabian group was to capture the city of Tiraspol and move to Odessa to gain access to the sea, goal was not achieved.

=== Podillia group ===
The Podillia group began the campaign on October 25, 1921, and met with early success. It first engaged and destroyed a soviet cavalry regiment, and used the captured equipment to transform itself into a cavalry unit. It continued on to the village of Vakhnivka, 60 km north of Kyiv, before being forced back by soviet forces. It was forced to retreat west, and crossed the Polish border on November 29.

=== Volynhia group ===
The Volynhia group began operations on November 4, 1921, and it also met with early successes. It won the city of Korosten, but was unable to defend it. When news of the retreat of the Podillia group became known, the Volynhia group was also forced to retreat west. However, it was encircled by Grigory Kotovsky's cavalry regiment near the village of Bazar. After a brief battle, most of the regiment was captured.

On November 22, 1921, 359 members of the regiment were executed by firing squad after refusing to defect. The remaining prisoners were handed over to Soviet authorities. Only 120 soldiers and officers escaped.

== Outcome ==
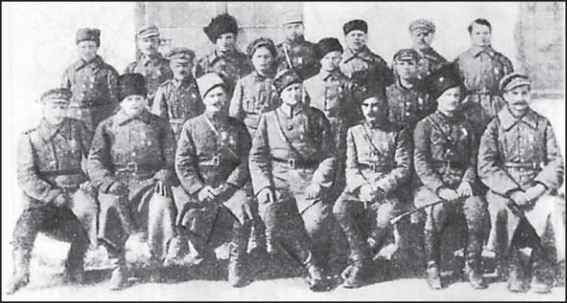
A group of participants of the Second Winter Campaign together with interned soldiers. Kalisz (Poland), autumn 1921

The Second Winter Campaign was the final battle by the Army of the Ukrainian National Republic against Bolshevik forces in Ukraine. The Second Winter Campaign of the UPR Army was the last attempt by the Ukrainian national-state forces to maintain Ukraine's independence by open military means during the national liberation struggles of 1917 to 1921.
