= Oleg Frelikh =

Russian actor and director (1887–1953)

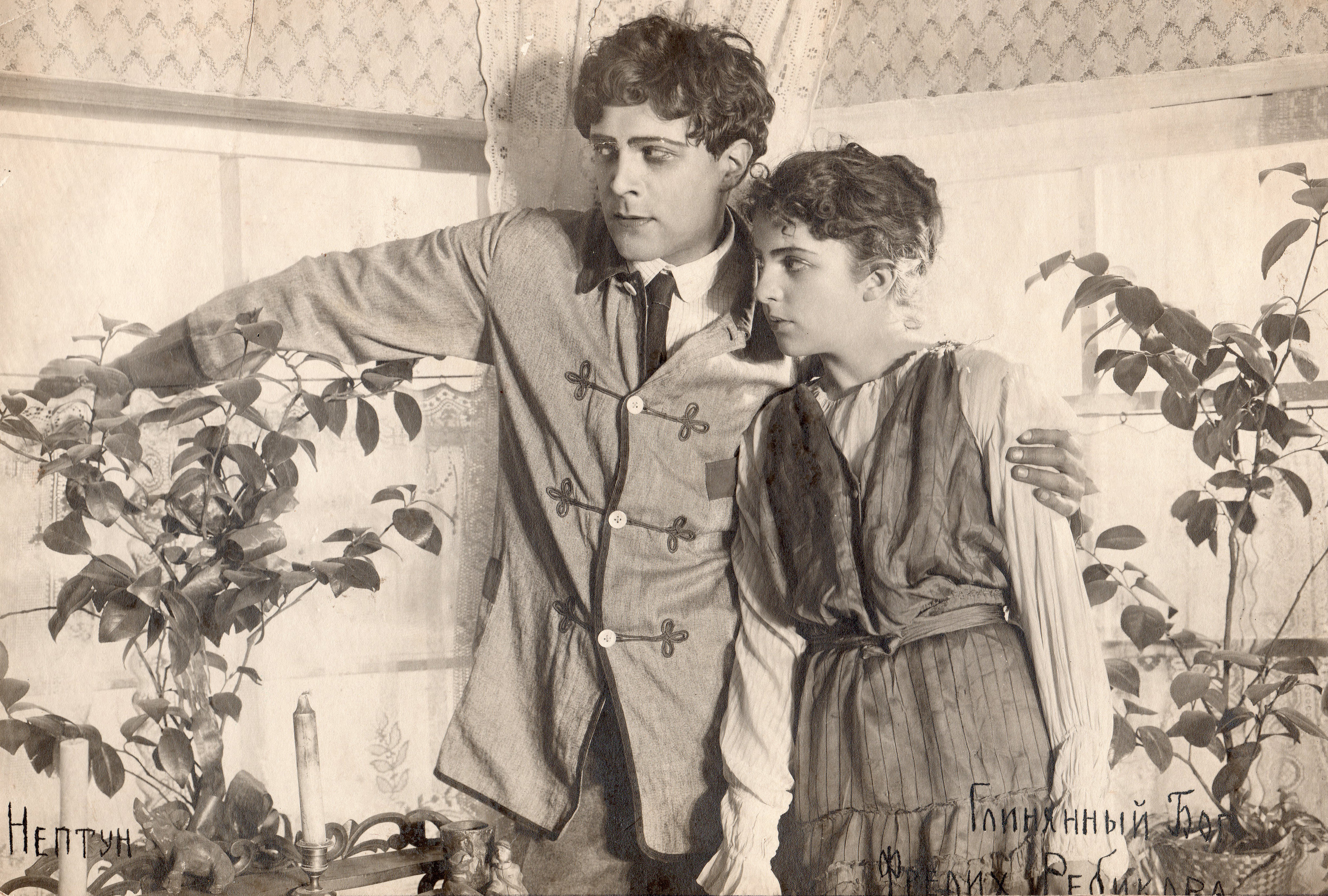
- Oleg Frelikh and Aleksandra Rebikova in the film Clay God, 1918
- Born: Oleg Nikolayevich Frelikh; 24 March 1887; Moscow, Russian Empire
- Died: 6 September 1953 (aged 66); Moscow, Soviet Union
- Occupations: Actor, director
- Years active: 1915–1950
- Spouse(s): Vera Valitskaya, Olga Dmitriyevna Bystritskaya

Oleg Nikolayevich Frelikh (Russian: Олег Николаевич Фре́лих; 24 March 1887 – 6 September 1953) was a Soviet and Russian stage and film actor and director. Honored Artist of the RSFSR (1947).

== Biography ==
Oleg Frelikh was born on 24 March 1887 in Moscow. He graduated from the law faculty of the Moscow University and in 1911, the drama department of the Moscow Philharmonic Society. Before and after the revolution he worked as an actor of theater and cinema. Along the way in the mid-20s he started to direct films himself, filming mainly for national studios; Belgoskino, Chuvashcinema, Uzbekfilm, Vostokkino. In 1935, Frelikh became an actor of the Russian Army Theatre and in 1939 came to work at the Moscow State Theatre named after Lenin's Komsomol. On the stage of Lenkom he performed from 1939 to 1941 and then from 1943 to 1951. In total Oleg played in more than 50 films, mostly in silent pictures. He typically played slick adventurers, young and elegant characters. He died on 6 September 1953.

Actor Andrei Fajt was Oleg Frelikh's cousin, and at one period they worked together a lot. Fajt wrote a book, Slave of the Magic Lamp, which includes pages that are dedicated to working together with Oleg Frelikh.

Frelikh was married to actresses Vera Nikolayevna Valitskaya and Olga Dmitriyevna Bystritskaya.

== Selected filmography ==
=== As actor ===
- 𝘊𝘭𝘢𝘺 𝘎𝘰𝘥 (1918)
- A Spectre Haunts Europe (1923) - the Emperor
- Locksmith and Chancellor (1923) - Leo von Turau
- Prostitute (1926) - passerby
- The Fall of Berlin (1949) - Franklin D. Roosevelt
- Zhukovsky (1950) - Aleksandr Stoletov

=== As director ===
- Prostitute (1926)
