= Pavel Pavlov (actor) =

Russian actor (1885–1974)

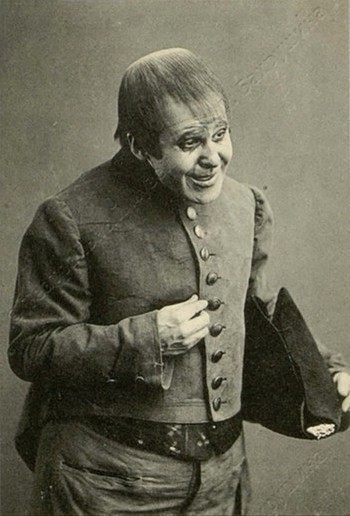

Pavel Pavlov (23 February 1885 – 23 April 1974) was a Soviet stage and film actor.

== Filmography ==
- The Queen of Spades (1916)
- Satan Triumphant (1917)
- It Illuminates, My Dear (1922)
- Raskolnikow (1923)
- I.N.R.I. (1923)
- The Power of Darkness (1924)
- Secrets of a Soul (1926)

== Bibliography ==
- Jung, Uli & Schatzberg, Walter. Beyond Caligari: The Films of Robert Wiene. Berghahn Books, 1999.
