= Yurii Tiutiunnyk =

Ukrainian general

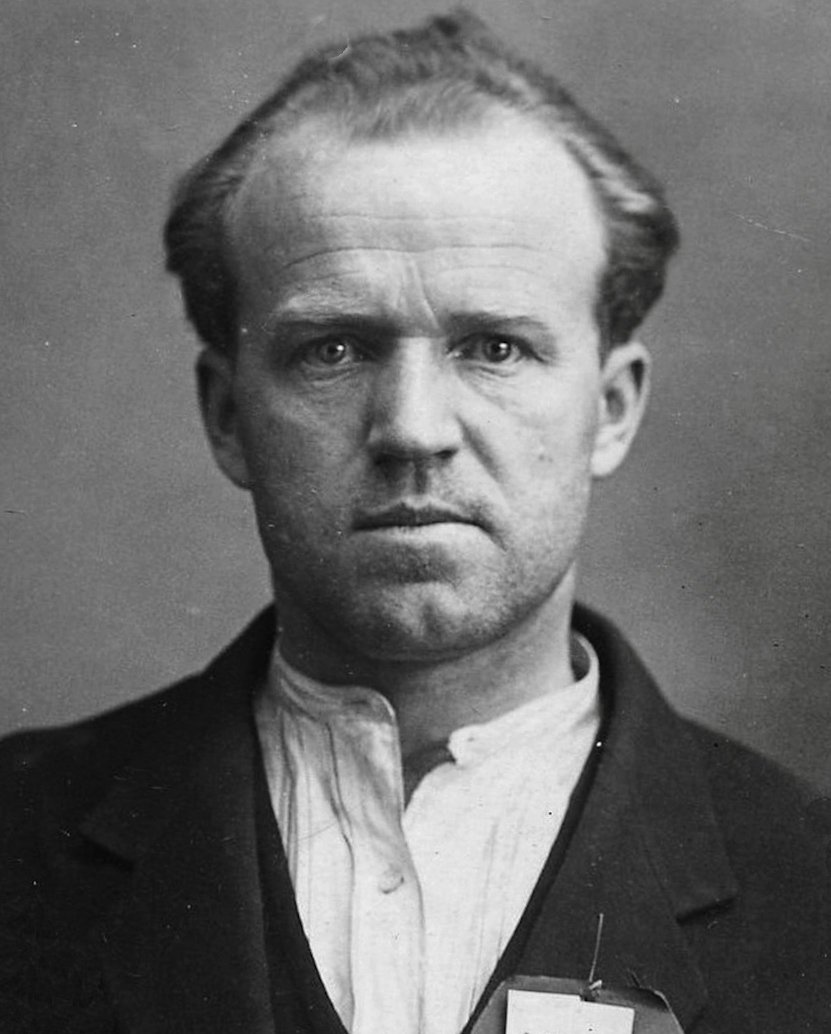
- Photo of Tiutiunnyk made after his arrest by the OGPU
- Born: 2 May [O.S. 20 April] 1891; Budyshche, Kiev Governorate, Russian Empire
- Died: 20 October 1930 (aged 39); Moscow, Soviet Union
- Cause of death: Execution by firing squad
- Military career
- Allegiance: Russian Empire (1904–1917); Ukrainian People's Republic
- Branch: Ukrainian People's Army
- Service years: 1904–1921
- Rank: Otaman Khorunzhy
- Commands: Kyiv Division
- Conflicts: World War I Ukrainian–Soviet War

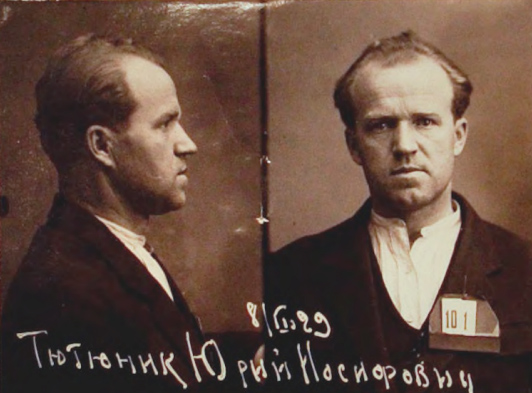
Photo of Tiutiunnyk made after his arrest by the OGPU (complete Russian Cyrillic reads Tyutyunik Yurii Iosifovich)

Yurii Yosypovych Tiutiunnyk (Note: Ukrainian: Юрій Йосипович Тютюнник) (2 May [O.S. 20 April] 1891 – 20 October 1930) was a general of the Ukrainian People's Army of the Ukrainian People's Republic (UNR) during the Ukrainian–Soviet War.

== Early years ==
Yurii Tiutiunnyk was born on 20 April 1891, to a peasant family, former serfs Yosyp and Maryna, in the village of Budyshche, near Kyiv. His older cousins, Levko and Ananiy Shevchenkos were the organizers of the Free Cossacks, later joining the UPSR. Only five out of nine children in his family reached adulthood. Tiutiunnyk finished his primary education at the village school and later at an agrarian school in Uman. He was married and had two daughters.

== Military service in World War I ==
Tiutiunnyk was drafted into the Imperial Russian Army in 1913 and initially served in the 6th Siberian battalion in Vladivostok. With the outbreak of World War I, in 1914 he became a non-commissioned officer and was wounded during the Battle of Lodz, in Poland in October of that year. For his recovery Tiutiunnyk was transferred to a reserve regiment in Kremenchuk. Upon recovery, he came back to the 6th battalion which at that time was fighting near the Lake Narach (today in Belarus).

Later Tiutiunnyk was offered command of the 6th Siberian battalion by the regimental command, but because he was interested in military strategy, the army suggested he undertake formal military studies. Tiutiunnyk successfully took entrance tests to the 1st Kyiv gymnasium, but soon he was sent to the Caucasus where he finished a military school in Gori (today in Georgia). After completing his studies, he was again offered command of the 6th battalion, which was still actively fighting during the war. Tiutiunnyk was wounded a second time, and after recuperating, he was sent to Simferopol, where he joined the 32nd Auxiliary battalion.

== Revolution ==
With the coming of the February Revolution, Tiutiunnyk's military acumen caught the attention of Alexander Kerensky, who was in Crimea at the time. Kerensky offered Tiutiunnyk command of the Headquarters of Odessa Military District, however, Tiutiunnyk did not place much faith in the future of the Provisional Government, and declined the post. In the Spring of 1917, he participated in the creation of the 1st Simferopol Regiment of Hetman Doroshenko.

Tiutiunnyk left for Kyiv as a military representative for the 2nd All-Ukrainian Military Congress, the meeting of which was unsanctioned. There he became elected as a non-partisan member of the Central Rada, and chairman of the Kiev Revolutionary Committee. Officially Tiutiunnyk was transferred to the 228th Reserve Regiment in Yekaterinoslav.

== Ukrainian–Soviet War ==
In the Autumn of 1917, Tiutiunnyk organized a unit of "Free Kozaks" in Zvenyhorodka, and became its leader. After the fall of Kyiv to Bolshevik forces in 1918, Tiutiunnyk transformed the unit to a kish-size of 20 thousand and engaged in battles throughout central Ukraine. He had a number of victories over the Bolshevik forces, including winning battles against the Bolshevik's 8th Army and 8,000 group of Mikhail Muravyov, while reclaiming the towns and cities like Birzula and Vapniarka from Bolshevik forces. Later, in 1918, Tiutiunnyk's unit waged guerilla warfare against both the occupying German forces and the forces of the new Hetmanate.

In February 1919, Tiutiunnyk merged his unit with that of Nykyfor Hryhoriv, who became the Commander in Chief while Tiutiunnyk became the Chief of Staff. The combined force was formidable, numbering over 23,000 soldiers, 52 cannons, and 20 armoured trains. The force cooperated through various battles, including with and against Bolshevik forces, against Entente forces and the White Army, taking under control cities of Kherson and Odessa.

Later, however, Tiutiunnyk concluded that the Bolshevik's aims in Ukraine were not beneficial, he united with the units of Ukrainian People's Army near Zhmerynka. In the summer of 1919 along with the 3rd Steel Rifle Division, 2nd Volyn Division, and 2nd Halych Brigade conducted series of successful military operations liberating several cities such as Zhytomyr, Bratslav, Uman, and others. By the end of the summer, his forces were faced against the Southern group of Iona Yakir and later in the fall dealing against the White movement General Yakov Slashchov.

From 6 December 1919 to 5 May 1920 he took part in the First Winter Campaign under the command of Mykhailo Pavlenko, leading the Kyiv Rifle Division with which he fought against the Bolsheviks to the fall of 1920.

Tiutiunnyk remained undaunted by the failure of the campaign, and participated in the planning of the Second Winter Campaign. This campaign took place in 1921, and although there were some early victories, it ultimately ended in failure. The unit was overrun and 359 soldiers were executed by the Red Guard near Zhytomyr. Tiutiunnyk, together with a small number of soldiers, escaped.

== Soviet Ukraine and execution ==
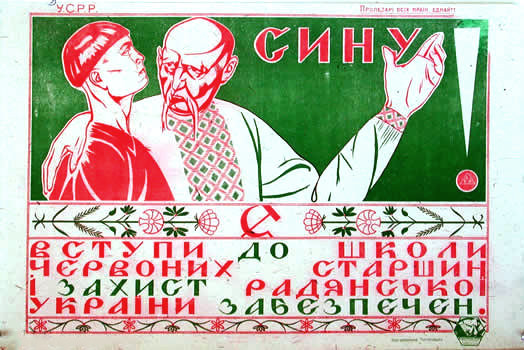
A 1921 Soviet recruitment poster with the Ukrainization theme. The text reads: "Son! Enroll in the School of Red Commanders, and the defence of Soviet Ukraine will be ensured."

After Second Winter Campaign Tiutiunnyk illegally settled in Lviv, which was then part of the Second Polish Republic. On March 26, 1923, former VVR head Mykhailo Doroshenko called upon Tiutiunnyk to return to Soviet Ukraine. On the night of June 17, 1923, Tiutiunnyk was arrested after crossing Dniester. The Soviet government invited him to work cooperatively, and he agreed, lecturing at the School of Red Commanders in Kharkiv. Later he co-wrote a movie script for the film "Zvenigora" by Alexander Dovzhenko He also played himself in an anti-Symon Petliura propaganda film, "P.K.P. (Pilsudski Bought Petliura)".

Later, however, Joseph Stalin ordered a reversal of Ukrainization policies in Soviet Ukraine and many Ukrainians became victims of political repression by the Stalinist regime. On 12 February 1929, Tiutiunnyk was arrested in Kharkiv and deported to Moscow where he was put on trial. On 3 December 1929, he was found guilty of anti-Soviet agitation for collaborating with the Ukrainian Military Organization and sentenced to death. On 20 October 1930, he was executed by firing squad in the Lubyanka, Moscow.

== Family ==
Tiutiunnyk's family was secretly transferred by the Cheka from abroad to Kharkiv, then after the death of Yurii they lived in Kuban until 1932. The further fate of Tiutiunnyk's family is unknown.

- Wife: Vira Andriivna Tiutiunnyk
- Children: two daughters

== Tiutiunnyk in popular Ukrainian culture ==
Through playing himself in various movie films, Tiutiunnyk created an image of himself as a dashing revolutionary in popular Soviet Ukrainian culture. This image was captured in verse by the Ukrainian writer Ivan Bahrianny and set to music by Hryhory Kytasty. The song "Pisnya Pro Tiutiunnyka" (Ukrainian: Пісня про Тютюнника — "Song about Tiutiunnyk") describes a popular image of his unit rushing to Ukraine from Siberia to help the Petliura government of the Ukrainian National Republic in 1919.
