= It Illuminates, My Dear =

1922 film

- German: Es leuchtet meine Liebe
- Directed by: Paul L. Stein
- Written by: Bobby E. Lüthge; R. Meinhardt
- Starring: Mady Christians; Hans Heinrich von Twardowski; Olga Belajeff
- Cinematography: Willy Gaebel
- Production company: PAGU
- Distributed by: UFA
- Release date: 20 November 1922
- Country: Germany
- Languages: Silent; German intertitles

It Illuminates, My Dear (German: Es leuchtet meine Liebe) is a 1922 German silent film directed by Paul L. Stein and starring Mady Christians, Hans Heinrich von Twardowski and Olga Belajeff.

== Cast ==
- Mady Christians as Jeanne, Marquise of Chatelet
- Hans Heinrich von Twardowski as Lucien, Duke of Eramont
- Olga Belajeff as Princess Germaine
- Arthur Brausewetter as Prince
- Gertrud de Lalsky as the wife of the Count of Lille
- William Dieterle as Saint Just
- Lia Eibenschütz as Antoinette, Jeanne's maid
- Ilka Grüning as Saint Just's mother
- Harry Hardt as Jaques
- Robert Leffler as Count von Lille
- Ernst Legal as Tapier
- Theodor Loos as Count Biron
- Heinrich Marlow as Count Lanzun
- Sophie Pagay as Thierrn's mother
- Pavel Pavlov as The Wolf dictator
- Greta Schröder as Therese
- Elsa Wagner as a woman
- Vicky Werckmeister as Fräulein von Lille
