= Leonid Leonidov =

Russian actor and director (1873–1941)

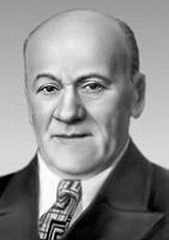
- Born: Leonid Meyerovich Volfenzon; 3 June [O.S. 22 May] 1873; Odessa, Kherson Governorate, Russian Empire
- Died: 6 August 1941 (aged 68); Moscow, Russian SFSR, Soviet Union
- Occupations: Actor; theatre director; pedagogue
- Years active: 1896–1941

Leonid Mironovich Leonidov (Russian: Леонид Миронович Леонидов, 3 June [O.S. 22 May] 1873 – 6 August 1941) was a Russian and Soviet actor, director and pedagogue. He was awarded the title of People's Artist of the USSR (1936).

== Biography ==
Born Leonid Meyerovich Volfenzon (Russian: Леонид Мейерович Вольфензон) in a Jewish family in Odessa, he worked in the Moscow Art Theatre from 1903. His roles included Dmitri Karamazov, Othello, Lopakhin. In 1920s and 1930s he also appeared in several films. Konstantin Stanislavski called him "the only Russian tragic actor." Leonidov was honored with People's Artist of the USSR in 1936.

== Filmography ==
- The Iron Heel (1919) as Wickson
- The Wings of a Serf (1926) as Ivan the Terrible
- His Excellency (1927) as Governor von Wahl / Rabbi
- Marionettes (1934) as The Munitions Manufacturer
