= Chuvashcinema =

Chuvash and Russian cinema company

- Native name: Чувашкино / Чăвашкино
- Company type: State-owned film studio
- Industry: Film production, film distribution
- Founded: 22 June 1926
- Founder: Ioakim Maksimov-Koshkinsky
- Defunct: April 2022
- Fate: Merged with the State Archive of Contemporary History of the Chuvash Republic
- Headquarters: Cheboksary, Soviet Union (now Russia)
- Products: Feature films, documentary films
- Parent: Government of the Chuvash Republic

Chuvashcinema or Chuvashkino (Russian: Чувашкино, Chuvash: Чăвашкино) was a Chuvash and Russian cinema company that manufactured, purchased, stored, and rented art and documentary films.

== History ==
The cinema company was based on June 22, 1926, in Cheboksary (Chuvash ASSR) by the director, a scriptwriter, the actor, the Honored worker of arts of the Russian Federation, the National actor of the Chuvash Republic Ioakim Maksimov-Koshkinsky.

During its existence, the studio has released 6 artistic and tens of documentary films. The first feature film was Volga rebels, released in 1926. Then the studio mostly focused on the production of documentary films. The organization changed its status and name multiple times and was solely engaged in distribution activities.

From 2018 to 2022, the Chuvashcinema studio worked on the production of thematic educational films that became part of the Legendary People (Люди-легенды) series. The movie highlighted the lives and achievements of prominent individuals who made significant contributions to the development of Chuvashia.

In November 2020, a criminal case was opened against the former director of Chuvashcinema, Andrei Abdyushov. The reason was that out of 29 films produced by the studio, only one was created by Chuvashcinema itself, while the other 28 were made by contracted organizations through outsourcing. At the same time, since 2017, a total of 104 million rubles from various levels of the state budget have been allocated for the maintenance and strengthening of the studio's technical infrastructure.

== Current status ==
In April 2022, the Cabinet of Ministers of the Chuvash Republic decided to liquidate the State Film Studio "Chuvashcinema" and the Archive of Electronic Documentation by merging them with the State Archive of Contemporary History of the Chuvash Republic. The functions of Chuvashcinema related to the development of cinematography were transferred to the Chuvash National Broadcasting Company.

Chuvashcinema archives included a number of art-publicistic tapes created together with the Kazan studio.
