= Volga Rebels =

1926 film

Volga rebels
- Directed by: Paul Petrov-Bytov
- Screenplay by: Joachim Maksimov-Koshkinsky; Paul Petrov-Bytov
- Based on: Events in the uprising
- Starring: S. Galich; Piter Kirillov; Maria Dobrova; Iona Talanov; Shura Zavialov
- Production companies: Lenfilm; Chuvashcinema
- Release date: 1926
- Running time: 78 minutes
- Country: Soviet Union
- Languages: Russian; Chuvash

Volga rebels (Chuvash: Atăl pălhavçisem) is a black and white silent movie directed by Paul Petrov-Bytov. "The film shows the struggle of the Chuvash people for their rights at the beginning of the 20th century". The movie created in Chuvash Republic.

== History of creation ==
A movie created for the celebration of the first Russian revolution.

The initiative to created the picture were made by the Regional Board of Education of the Chuvash Autonomous Soviet Socialist Republic and the chief director of the Chuvash Drama Joachim S. Maksimov-Koshkinsky

Chuvash had in those years was a lot of history, which begged the screen. The Regional Board of Education considers it necessary to use it to shoot the upcoming films of the revolutionary movement among the Chuvash.

The screenplay written Maksimov-Koshkinsky. The plot supposed to address the peasants of the village Ismeli (now the Octobersky, Mariinsko-Posadsky District) in 1906.

Due to the fact that in Chuvashia was not the infrastructure for film production, a film created in collaboration with the "Sevzapkino" (Leningrad). On 31 August 1925 between him and the Central Executive Committee of CHASSR was made the contract. "Sevzapkino" was supposed to pick up the director and actors. In exchange, Leningrad received income from operation of the film outside the territory of Chuvashia, for which they pledged to make a single copy of movies with subtitles in Chuvash.

Filming took place in the Cheboksary and nearby villages. Appointed director Paul Petrovich Petrov-Bytov, later famous for the film "Pugachev," "Defeat Yudenich", etc. The main roles of actors gaining "Sevzapkino." In the episodes were filmed, and Chuvash artists: I. Maximov, Koshkinsky, K. Egorov, I. Rublev and Tanya Yuen (mother in a small role). For crowd scenes attracted peasants from neighboring villages, school pupils Cheboksary commune.

The movie was released under a joint brand "Sevzapkino" and "Chuvashcinema," although officially "Chuvashcinema" was established only in 1927.

Premiere was held in Cheboksary, 22 June 1926 during the annual fair. The demonstration was held in the building of the Chuvash Theater. The newspaper "Kanash" wrote:

The movie "The Volga rebels" tells the story of the Chuvash, their deeds and customs in the memorable feature films. It consists of a prologue, epilogue, and 8 parts. In addition to showing the events of 1905-1907. Here with high confidence shows some household details and rituals, such as "Chÿk", "Akatui", etc. The picture is of great importance in raising the cultural and political level of the Chuvash peasantry
