= Prostitute (1927 film) =

1926 film by Oleg Frelikh

- Directed by: Oleg Frelikh
- Written by: E. Demidovich; Noi Galkin; Viktor Shklovsky
- Starring: Vera Georgiyevna Orlova; Olga Bonus; E. Yarosh
- Cinematography: N. Winkler
- Edited by: Esfir Shub
- Production company: Belgoskino
- Release date: 1927
- Running time: 77 minutes
- Country: Soviet Union
- Language: Silent

Prostitute (Russian: Проститутка, romanized: Prostitutka) also known as Slain by Life (Russian: Убитая жизнью, romanized: Ubitaya Zhiznyu) is a 1927 Soviet silent drama film directed by Oleg Frelikh.

== Plot ==
Prostitute (1927)

The film is set in Moscow during the mid 1920s, heyday of the New Economic Policy, or NEP. Some live the high life while others barely survive. A young girl, Lyuba lives with her elderly Aunt Barbara. The aunt abuses the girl, and later, "sells" her to a neighbor and kicks her out of the house. But Lyuba does not stay in the street for long, she is sheltered by a woman she meets, who turns out to be a brothel madam. The madam also imposes a contract of adhesion upon the girl.

The Tyrkin family lives next to Aunt Barbara. Pyotr Tyrkin works for the businessman-butcher Kondratiev. Tyrkin's everyday life is well-adjusted. His wife Vera keeps house and raises their two young children. Working for Kondratiev brings a regular income. Tyrkin is killed when drunk. Left without a livelihood, Vera is forced by the situation to give herself to the butcher (the boss of her deceased husband), and then to sell her body.

On the street she meets with the veteran prostitute Manka. Manka tells Vera that when she worked as a maid, she was seduced by the son of the mistress. After getting kicked out of the house by the mistress for having relations with her son, she became homeless. On the street she came to work at a whorehouse and contracted a venereal disease from which she is still recovering.

Vera is unable to earn money by prostitution. Both of her children fall seriously ill. In desperation she tries to commit suicide by throwing herself into an ice-hole. But she does not succeed and is rescued. Among the saviors is Lyuba who managed to escape from the brothel and now works in a sewing workshop at a venereal dispensary. She has a new boyfriend is Shura who is a member of the Komsomol. The brothel keeper does not want to just let Lyuba go. She threatens to tell Shura all about her past. So, the teary-eyed girl tells Shura everything herself. Shura sympathizes with her and helps to write a letter to the prosecutor. The police break up the den.

Lyuba and Shura are happy. Life is getting better for Vera too because Shura helps her get a job as a railway points operator and her children begin to go the kindergarten. Manka is housed in a venereal hospital.

== Cast ==
- Olga Bonus as Aunt Varvara (as O. Bonus)
- Mark Donskoy
- L. Krasina
- Ivan Lagutin as Vasiliy Dmitrich (as I. Lagutin)
- Aleksandr Ledashchev
- Vera Orlova
- E. Sheremetyeva
- Pavel Tamm as Kondratiev - the butcher (as P. Tamm)
- E. Toeplitz
- Elisaveta Yarosh Elisaveta Yarosh ... Lyuba
- Vasili Yaroslavtsev as Peter Stupin (as V. Yaroslavtsev)

== Interesting facts ==
- "Prostitute" shares the glory of being the first Belarusian feature film together with "Forest Story". Work on the film "Prostitute" started earlier and it was also released first in the all-union movie theaters, but "Forest Story" was shown in Minsk first.
- Despite the film's success with the audience, the critics of that time did not receive the film too positively, and some saw in it the influence of the "bourgeois pseudo-scientific German films".
- A circulaire dated 1937 from "Belgoskino" reported to Boris Shumyatsky in Moscow, the head of the main department of the film industry of the USSR about neutralizing "enemy" films. The ban for the film "Prostitute" was motivated by the fact that the film was seen as being "politically incorrect".
- A significant episode (by the length of the film) is dedicated to the lecture "about the dangers of prostitution and social ways of getting rid of it." The lecture uses the statistics available at the time and simple animation.
- The intertitles are in three languages, Russian, English and Chinese.

== Literature ==
- Y. S. Kalashnikov Essays on the history of Soviet Cinema: 1917—1934, — Moscow: Iskusstvo, 1956.
- Igor Avdeev, Larisa Zaitseva All Belarus Films: Catalog-Handbook. Feature Films (1926—1970). — Minsk: Belaruskaya navuka, 2001. — Volume 1. — 240 pages. — ISBN 985-08-0023-2
