= Man Is Man's Enemy =

1923 film

- Directed by: Ivane Perestiani
- Starring: Vladimir Maksimov; T. Maqsimova; Ivane Perestiani; V. Djamgarova
- Cinematography: Aleksandre Digmelovi
- Production company: Kinos Seqtsia
- Release date: 1 February 1923
- Running time: 50 minutes
- Country: Soviet Union
- Languages: Silent; Georgian and Russian intertitles

Man Is Man's Enemy (Georgian:Katsi katsistvis mgelia) is a 1923 Soviet silent action adventure film directed by Ivane Perestiani.

== Cast ==
- Vladimir Maksimov as Kraev
- T. Maqsimova as Tatiana Aleqseevna
- Ivane Perestiani as Carter
- V. Djamgarova as Baroness Fux

== Bibliography ==
- Rollberg, Peter. Historical Dictionary of Russian and Soviet Cinema. Scarecrow Press, 2008.
