= The Fight for the Ultimatum Factory =

1923 film

- Directed by: Dmitri Bassalygo
- Written by: Mikhail Boitler; Vladimir Kirshon
- Cinematography: Vladimir Dobrozhansky
- Production company: Proletkino
- Release date: 24 December 1923
- Country: Soviet Union
- Languages: Silent; Russian intertitles

The Fight for the Ultimatum Factory (Russian: Борьба за Ультиматум, romanized: Borba za Ultimatum is a 1923 Soviet silent adventure film directed by Dmitri Bassalygo.

== Cast ==
- Vasiliy Aristov as Komsomol member Fedya
- Vladimir Karin
- Mikhail Lenin
- Olga Tretyakova
- Tsekhanskaya

== Bibliography ==
- Christie, Ian & Taylor, Richard. The Film Factory: Russian and Soviet Cinema in Documents 1896-1939. Routledge, 2012.
