= Aleksandr Razumny =

Russian film director and screenwriter (1891–1972)

- Born: Aleksandr Yefimovich Razumny; 1 May 1891; Elizavetgrad, Russian Empire (now Kirovohrad, Ukraine)
- Died: 16 November 1972 (aged 81); Moscow, Soviet Union (now Russia)
- Occupations: Film director screenwriter
- Years active: 1915 - 1961

Aleksandr Yefimovich Razumny (Russian: Александр Ефимович Разумный, 1 May 1891 – 16 November 1972) was a Russian and Soviet film director and screenwriter. He was a graduate of the Grekov Odessa Art school in 1914.

== Filmography ==
director

- The Life and Death of Lieutenant Schmidt (Жизнь и смерть лейтенанта Шмидта) (1917)
- The Fourth Wife (Четвертая жена) (1918)
- Uprising (Восстание) (1918)
- Flavia Tessini (Флавия Тессини) (1918)
- The Last Meeting (Последняя встреча) (1919)
- White and Black (Белое и черное) (1919)
- Comrade Abram (Товарищ Абрам) (1919)
- Two Poles (Два поляка) (1920)
- Mother (Мать) (1920)
- Brigade Commander Ivanov (Комбриг Иванов) (1923)
- The Gribushin Family (Семья Грибушиных) (1923)
- Outlaws of Batka Knysh (Банда батьки Кныша) (1924)
- Valley of Tears (Долина слез) (1924)
- The Hard Years (Тяжелые годы) (1925)
- Superfluous People (Лишние люди) (1926)
- Pique Dame (Пиковая дама) (1927)
- Prince or Clown (Принц или клоун) (1928)
- The Plight of the Island (Бегствующий остров) (19)
- Kara-bugaz (Кара-Бугаз) (1935)
- Personal File (Личное дело) (1939)
- Timur and His Team (Тимур и его команда) (1940)
- Timur's Oath (Клятва Тимура) (1942)
- Miklukho-Maklai (Миклухо-Маклай) (1947)
- The Adventures of Corporal Kolchekov (Случай с ефрейтором Кочетковым) (1955)
- Homecoming (Игнотас вернулся домой) (1957)
- Sergeant Fetisov (Сержант Фетисов) (1961)
