= Tale of the Woods =

1926 film

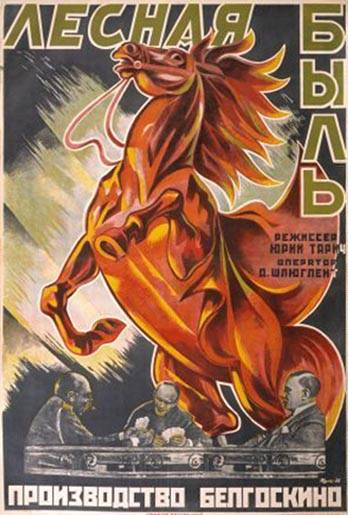
- Russian: Лесная быль
- Directed by: Yuri Tarich
- Written by: Yuri Tarich; Mikhas Charot
- Story by: Mikhas Charot
- Based on: "The Swineherd" by Mikhas Charot
- Starring: Leonid Danilov; T. Kotelnikova; Ivan Klyukvin; Mstislav Kotelnikov; L. Dedintsev
- Cinematography: David Shlyugleyt
- Production company: Belgoskino
- Release date: 1926
- Country: Soviet Union
- Language: Russian

Tale of the Woods, also known as Forest Life or Forest Story (Belarusian: Лясная быль), is a 1927 silent film, based upon a story by Michaś Čarot and directed by Yuri Tarich. It has been described as "a Civil War drama romance", set in Belorussia and focuses on the Bolshevik struggle against the Poles. It was directed by Yuri Tarich, who some consider "the father of Belarusian cinema", and was the first Belgoskino film to be released.

== Premise ==
The film tells about the adventures of a young scout Grishka and his friend - the daughter of a forester, who helps partisans in the fight against the occupiers.

== Plot ==
Polish troops are encamped on the estate of Drabsky, a member of the landed gentry. Under the command of Colonel Yazstremski, the troops are ordered to arrest all suspicious looking characters. In the field, the old shepherd, Grishki, calls on his 20-something year old son, Grishka, to help conduct the Bolshevik, Stephan, to the blacksmith, Andre. With help from Drabsky's overseer, Kaziuk, the troops find and catch Stephan. Grishka flees to the farm of the father of his girlfriend, Gelka. The troops follow and Grishka, Gelka and the father are arrested. They are eventually freed, but Gelka is forced to work for Drabsky.

Guerillas prepare a proclamation reminding the peasants that they should support each other. Kaziuk, who learns about the proclamation, informs Polish troops who arrest those they find with proclamations. Some of those arrested are eventually shot.

Gelka, working in Drabsky's manor, finds a map with locations of other Polish troops. She steals it and jumps from a second floor window to the ground and runs away.

Guerillas, dressed in Polish uniforms, free the surviving arrestees. They fight and overcome the Polish troops on Drabsky's estate, and corner Yazstremski. The scene ends before the viewer finds out what happens to Yazstremski.

Partisans take on troops in a nearby village. As troops advance towards the barricade of the guerillas, Grishka throws a hand grenade at the troops, and runs away. As he jumps on a horse to ride away, Kaziuk spots Grishka and shoots, wounding him. Kaziuk ties up an unconscious Grishka and throws him in a cart, planning to take him to Polish-occupied Minsk. But Grishka awakens, unties himself, and escapes. Back in the village, just the Polish troops appear to be ready to overwhelm the partisans, Gelka arrives, bringing the Red Cavalry with her.

Partisans and troops enter Minsk. It is 11 July, the day of the city's liberation. As soldiers chase off the Polish troops, Grishka, Gelka, and others meet at Red Headquarters. As the movie ends, Gelka looks lovingly at Grishka, who tries to not notice because he is standing guard.

== Cast ==
- Leonid Danilov as Grishka (as L. Danilov)
- T. Kotelnikova as Gelka
- Ivan Klyukvin as Andrey
- Mstislav Kotelnikov as Stepan
- L. Dedintsev as Yastrzhemskiy (as A. Dedintsev)
- Vladimir Korsh as Adjutant
- P. Rozhitsky as Zhabinskiy
- Sergey Borisov as Wachtmeister
- Klavdia Chebyshyova as Housekeeper
- Galina Kravchenko as Vanda
- Vassiliy Makarov as Forester
- A. Otradin as Levon
- Nikolai Vitovtov as Adjutant General
- Aleksandr Zhukov as Kazyuk

== Notes ==
In the original ending scenes, top state official Josef Adamovich, Wilhelm Knorin, and Alexander Cherviakov appeared. They were included in the movie by director Yuri Tarich because they had assisted Tarich. Ten years later, they were determined to be “enemies of the people.” Cherviakov and Knoryn shot themselves before they could be arrested. Adamovich was arrested and sentenced to death. Tarich was then ordered to re-edit the film, removing their scene(s).

Film posters compared Forest Story's star to America's Douglas Fairbanks. "Soon! See the Belarusian Douglas Fairbanks – Leonid Danilov in the first national film Forest Life!"

The film was not allowed to be shown in Austria, Latvia or Czechoslovakia.

The picture was shot in Pryluki, near Minsk, in the authentic surroundings of the events and with the participation of villagers who fought against the Polish troops during the Civil War.

Vladimir Korsh-Sablin, who later became a well known Belgoskino director on his own, plays the role of "Adjutant" and was an assistant director on the film.

The film is the first ever produced by Belgoskino. The head of the Belarusian National Film Museum, Igor Avdeev, has written that the fact that “Forest Story” was the first completed and shown Belgoskino production, is "indisputable."

== Reviews ==
Summaries of the reviews are listed in A Catalog of All Belarusian Films, 1926-1976, by Igor Avdeev and Larissa Zaritsa. They range from lukewarm to positive. Some complain about a lack of authenticity, but others laud it as an outstanding beginning of Belarusian cinema.
