= Georgi Stabovoi =

Georgi Mikhailovich Stabovoi (Russian: Георгий Михайлович Стабовой; April 2, 1894 – July 10, 1968) was a Ukrainian/Soviet film director and screenwriter, born in Kozelets.

== Filmography ==
- П.К.П. (Пилсудский купил Петлюру) (P.K.P. (Pilsudski Bought Petliura)) (1926)
- Свежий ветер (Fresh Wind) (1926)
- Два дня (Two Days) (1927)
- Человек из леса (The Man from the Forest) (1928)
- Экспонат из паноптикума (Exhibit of the Panopticon) (1929)
- Жемчужина Семирамиды (Semiramis's Pearl) (1929)
- Шагать мешают (Walking Obstructed) (1930)
