= The Punishment of Shirvanskaya =

1926 film

- Directed by: Ivane Perestiani
- Cinematography: Aleksandre Digmelovi
- Production company: Sakhkinmretsvi
- Release date: 3 December 1926
- Running time: 72 minutes
- Country: Soviet Union
- Languages: Silent; Georgian intertitles

The Punishment of Shirvanskaya (Georgian:Sasdjeli) is a 1926 Soviet silent action adventure film directed by Ivane Perestiani. It is a sequel to The Crime of Shirvanskaya.

== Cast ==
- Maria Shirai as Vicountess Shirvanskaya
- Aleksandr Shirai as Douglas McLin
- Pavel Yesikovsky as Misha
- Sofia Jozeffi as Duniasha
- Kador Ben-Salim as Tom Jackson
- Marius Jakobini as Jalmar

== Bibliography ==
- Rollberg, Peter. Historical Dictionary of Russian and Soviet Cinema. Scarecrow Press, 2008.
