= The Wings of a Serf =

1926 film

- Directed by: Yuri Tarich
- Written by: Konstantin Schildkroet; Viktor Shklovsky; Yuri Tarich
- Starring: Leonid Leonidov
- Cinematography: Mikhail Vladimirsky
- Edited by: Esfir Shub
- Production company: Sovkino
- Release date: 16 November 1926
- Running time: 79 minutes
- Country: Soviet Union
- Languages: Silent; Russian intertitles

The Wings of a Serf also known as Ivan the Terrible (Russian: Крылья холопа, romanized: Krylya kholopa) is a 1926 Soviet silent historical drama film directed by Yuri Tarich and starring Leonid Leonidov, Ivan Klyukvin and Safiyat Askarova.

The film's sets were designed by the art director Vladimir Yegorov.

== Plot ==
The Wings of a Serf (1926)

Set in the 16th century during the reign of Ivan the Terrible, the story follows Nykishka, a talented serf and inventor living in the village of the boyar Lupatov. Fascinated by the idea of flight, Nykishka crafts a pair of homemade wings. He shares his dream of flying with his beloved serf, Fima.

Nearby, in the estate of the boyar Kurlyatev, a mechanical clock breaks. During a raid, Kurlyatev captures the ingenious mechanic Nykishka and his beloved Fima, forcibly taking them to his estate. Discovering Nykishka's "devilish invention," Kurlyatev tortures him while seducing Fima by luring her to his chambers.

Lupatov submits a petition to Ivan the Terrible, accusing Kurlyatev of lawlessness. Seizing the opportunity to settle an old grudge, the tsar sends his Oprichniks to destroy Kurlyatev's estate and bring his serfs to the tsar's court at Alexandrovskaya Sloboda.

At the court, the tsar is preoccupied with flax trading and owns a flax-breaking wheel, which unexpectedly breaks. While no one can repair it, Nykishka succeeds. Tsarina Maria Temryukovna asks what reward Nykishka desires for fixing the wheel, and he replies that he wants to build wings to enable human flight.

Intrigued, Ivan the Terrible decides to entertain foreign guests and orders Nykishka to demonstrate his invention. During Bright Week, in front of a crowd, Nykishka successfully flies. However, the tsar declares the invention demonic, imprisons Nykishka, and sentences him to death.

Tsarina Maria, captivated by the serf's beauty, helps him escape. When Ivan the Terrible discovers this betrayal, he storms into Maria's chambers and strangles her. Nykishka dies during his attempt to flee.

== Cast ==
- Leonid Leonidov as Tsar Ivan the Terrible
- Ivan Klyukvin as Nikita, serf-inventor
- Safiyat Askarova as Tsar's wife Maria
- Vladimir Korsh as Tsar's son Ivan
- Nikolai Prozorovsky as Fedor Basmanov, courtier
- M. Arkanoff as Kurliator
- Ivan Arkanov as Prince Kurlyatev
- Tatyana Barysheva as Court maid
- Vasily Bokarev
- O. Britan as Appearing

== Bibliography ==
- Christie, Ian & Taylor, Richard. The Film Factory: Russian and Soviet Cinema in Documents 1896-1939. Routledge, 2012.
