= The Song on the Rock =

1926 film

- Directed by: Leo Moor
- Written by: Khrisanf Khersonsky
- Production company: Goskino
- Release date: 16 March 1926
- Country: Soviet Union
- Languages: Silent; Russian intertitles

The Song on the Rock (Russian: Песнь на камне, romanized: Pesn na kamne) is a 1926 Soviet silent historical drama film directed by Leo Moor.

== Bibliography ==
- Christie, Ian & Taylor, Richard. The Film Factory: Russian and Soviet Cinema in Documents 1896-1939. Routledge, 2012.
