= The Bay of Death =

1926 film

- Directed by: Abram Room
- Written by: Boris Leonidov; Aleksei Novikov-Priboy
- Cinematography: Yevgeni Slavinsky
- Production company: Goskino
- Release date: 5 February 1926
- Running time: 84 minutes
- Country: Soviet Union
- Languages: Silent; Russian intertitles

The Bay of Death (Russian: Бухта смерти, romanized: Bukhta smerti) is a 1926 Soviet silent drama film directed by Abram Room.

== Synopsis ==
One of the southern ports are taken over by the whites. After a failed attempt to steal ammunition from the barracks for the partisans, Nikolai Razdolny (A. Matsevich) runs to a lighthouse where the guerrillas have strengthened their positions. White Guards establish surveillance of Nicholas' father, Ivan (V. Yaroslavtsev), who previously did not share the views of his son. When they arrest the revolutionary command of the "Swan" ship together with older Razdolny, the mechanic, they order him to assume his former responsibilities. When the "Swan" is approaching the lighthouse, the mechanic opens the Kingston, and the ship begins to sink.

== Cast ==
- V. Yaroslavtsev as Ivan Razdolny (mechanic)
- A. Matsevich as Nikolai Razdolny (eldest son of Ivan)
- Vasili Lyudvinsky as Pavlik Razdolny (youngest son of Ivan)
- A. Ravich Elisaveta Razdolny (wife of Ivan)
- Nikolai Saltykov as Surkov
- Leonid Yurenev as Masloboev
- Elizaveta Kartasheva as Anna Kuznetsova
- Aleksei Kharlamov as captain of the ship
- Artashes Ai-Artyan as Saim
- Boris Zagorsky as spy
- Andrey Fayt as Alibekov

== Bibliography ==
- Christie, Ian & Taylor, Richard. The Film Factory: Russian and Soviet Cinema in Documents 1896-1939. Routledge, 2012.
