= Savur-Mohyla (film) =

1926 film

The Savur-Mohyla
- Directed by: Ivane Perestiani
- Cinematography: Aleksandre Digmelovi
- Production company: Sakhkinmretsvi
- Release date: 26 August 1926
- Running time: 77 minutes
- Country: Soviet Union
- Languages: Silent; Russian; Georgian intertitles

The Savur-Mohyla (Russian: Савур-могила) is a 1926 Soviet silent adventure film directed by Ivane Perestiani. It is the sequel to the 1923 film Red Devils.

== Plot ==
Savur-Mohyla (1926)

Sometime after the events of the previous film, Nestor Makhno, bandit leader and anarchist, escapes from prison with the help of his supporters. Misha, Dunyasha, Tom Jackson, and Oksana are informed of this and are ordered to recapture Makhno, who has fled to the anti-Soviet town of Savur-Mohyla.

== Cast ==
- Pavel Yesikovsky as Mischa
- Sofia Jozeffi as Dunyasha
- Kador Ben-Salim as Tom Jackson
- Svetlana Luiks as Oksana
- A. Bikhova as Marusya
- Vladimir Sutyrin as Nestor Makhno
- Konstantin Ryabov as Taras
- Lisenko as Zosim Antipych
- Patvakan Barkhudaryan as Makhno’s man
- M. Mirzoian as Makhno’s man
- A. Smoldovski
- Aleksandr Gromov
- A. Kusikov

== Bibliography ==
- Rollberg, Peter. Historical Dictionary of Russian and Soviet Cinema. Scarecrow Press, 2008.
