= The Gribushin Family =

1923 film

- Directed by: Aleksandr Razumny
- Written by: Vasili Kamensky
- Cinematography: Grigory Giber; Pyotr Yermolov
- Production company: Kino-Moskva
- Release date: 1923
- Country: Soviet Union
- Languages: Silent; Russian intertitles

The Gribushin Family (Russian: Семья Грибушиных, romanized: Semya Gribushinykh is a 1923 Soviet silent drama film directed by Aleksandr Razumny.

== Plot ==
Between the manufacturer Gribushin and student Maxim, the tutor of his son, schoolboy George, a clash occurs. Gribushin fires Maxim from the position of tutor. The October Revolution forces the manufacturer to flee abroad, and his children, Sonia and George, are sent to work in the Volga region. On the day of the fifth anniversary of the October Revolution Gribushin returns to the USSR for his jewels ...

== Bibliography ==
- Christie, Ian & Taylor, Richard. The Film Factory: Russian and Soviet Cinema in Documents 1896-1939. Routledge, 2012.
