= Brigade Commander Ivanov =

1923 film

- Directed by: Aleksandr Razumny
- Cinematography: Aleksandr Razumny
- Production company: Proletkino
- Release date: 24 October 1923
- Country: Soviet Union
- Languages: Silent; Russian intertitles

Brigade Commander Ivanov (Russian: Комбриг Иванов, romanized: Kombrig Ivanov) is a 1923 Soviet silent comedy film directed by Aleksandr Razumny. It was released in the United States as Beauty and the Bolshevik.

== Plot ==
People cheerfully greet the brigade red troopers who have arrived in the village to rest. As Brigade Commander Ivanov comes to stay in the house of the priest he falls in love with his daughter. Their marriage plans are hindered by religious prejudices as the priest's daughter insists on the wedding to be in the church ...

== Cast ==
- Pyotr Leontyev as Brigade Commander Ivanov
- N. Belyayev as priest
- Mariya Blyumental-Tamarina priest's wife
- Olga Tretyakova as Olympiada, priest's daughter
- G. Volkonskaya as baker of communion bread
- Maria Arnazi-Borshak as komsomol member
- Vsevolod Massino as komsomol member
- Leonid Konstantinovskiy as komsomol member

== Bibliography ==
- Christie, Ian & Taylor, Richard. The Film Factory: Russian and Soviet Cinema in Documents 1896-1939. Routledge, 2012.
