= A Spectre Haunts Europe =

1923 film by Vladimir Gardin

- Directed by: Vladimir Gardin
- Written by: Georgi Tasin; Edgar Allan Poe(story)
- Starring: Zoya Barantsevich; Oleg Frelikh
- Cinematography: Boris Zavelev
- Production company: VUFKU
- Release date: 13 February 1923
- Country: Soviet Union
- Languages: Silent; Russian intertitles

A Spectre Haunts Europe (Russian: Призрак бродит по Европе, romanized: Prizrak brodit po Evrope) is a 1923 Soviet silent horror film directed by Vladimir Gardin and written by Georgi Tasin. It was made by the Ukrainian Soviet Socialist Republic's production company VUFKU. It is based on Edgar Allan Poe's 1842 short story The Masque of the Red Death. The film features a massacre on the Odessa Steps which may have served as an inspiration for the more famous scene in Sergei Eisenstein's Battleship Potemkin. The film's sets were designed by the art director Vladimir Yegorov. Cameraman Boris Zavalev filmed the movie on location in Crimea. Many reference sources list the film as 1921, but it was actually only released in 1922.

This is one of the few silent horror films ever made in Russia, the other notable titles being The Queen of Spades (1910 and 1916) and The Vij (1908 and 1916).

== Plot ==
The conceited leader of an unnamed European nation comes across a young shepherdess while walking outdoors. He falls in love with her, but Fate has preordained that he must suffer because of the way he has enslaved and mistreated his people. The girl's father turns out to be the leader of a band of revolutionaries who are seeking to overthrow the despot. The plot does not closely follow the Edgar Allan Poe short story at all.

== Cast ==
- Zoya Barantsevich
- Oleg Frelikh
- Evgeniy Gryaznov
- Lidiya Iskritskaya-Gardina
- Ivan Kapralov
- Vasili Kovrigin
- Iona Talanov
- Karl Tomski
- Vladimir Yegorov

== Bibliography ==
- Taylor, Richard. Battleship Potemkin: The Film Companion. I.B.Tauris, 2001.
