= 1926 in film =

The following is an overview of 1926 in film, including significant events, a list of films released, and notable births and deaths.

== Top-grossing films (U.S.) ==
The top ten 1926 released films by box office gross in North America are as follows:

Highest-grossing films of 1926
Rank	Title	Distributor	Domestic rentals
1	What Price Glory?	Fox Film	$2,000,000
2	The Black Pirate	United Artists	$1,700,000
3	Beau Geste	Paramount	$1,500,000
4	The Volga Boatman	Producers Distributing Corporation	$1,275,375
5	Don Juan	Warner Bros.	$1,258,000
6	Tell It to the Marines	MGM	$1,250,000
7	Sparrows	United Artists	$966,878
8	The Better 'Ole	Warner Bros.	$955,000
9	The Son of the Sheik	United Artists	$820,000
10	The Sea Beast	Warner Bros.	$814,000

== Events ==
- February – The oldest surviving animated feature film is released in Weimar Germany, directed by Lotte Reiniger. It is called The Adventures of Prince Achmed (Die Abenteuer des Prinzen Achmed).
- August 5 – Warner Brothers debuts the first Vitaphone film, Don Juan. The Vitaphone system uses multiple 33 1/3 rpm gramophone records developed by Bell Telephone Laboratories and Western Electric to play back music and sound effects synchronized with film.
- August 23 – Rudolph Valentino, whose film The Son of the Sheik is currently playing, dies at the age of 31 in New York. Riots occur at the funeral parlor as thousands of people try to see his body.
- September 27 to October 3 – International Film Congress (Congrès International du Cinématographe) held in Paris, where producers, distributors, and critics discuss the post-World War global film market.
- October 7 – Warner Brothers release the second Vitaphone film, The Better 'Ole, starring Sydney Chaplin.
- October 11 – Public premiere of Till the Bells Ring, possibly the world's first feature-length sound-on-film talkie (using Lee de Forest's Phonofilm system) in Edinburgh (Scotland). It is an historical domestic comedy written by and starring Graham Moffat with dialogue in Scots. There had been a (technically deficient) private screening on January 28 in London.
- December 5 – The 1925 Soviet film Battleship Potemkin premieres in the United States, at the Biltmore Theatre in Manhattan.
- Theodore W. Case and E. I. Sponable demonstrate their sound-on-film experiments to William Fox of the Fox Film Corporation. The Fox-Case Corp. is formed in an effort to exploit the system, which is given the name Movietone. Fox begin to create Movietone News newsreels at this time. One of the first newsreels is of Charles Lindbergh's takeoff for Paris (May 20, 1927).
- Al Jolson films A Plantation Act, one of the first unreleased talkies and a test film for The Jazz Singer
- Ang Tatlong Hambog (The Three Humbugs), the first Filipino film to feature a kissing (make out) scene, is released in the Philippines.

== Notable films released in 1926 ==
For the complete list of US film releases for the year, see United States films of 1926

=== 0-9 ===
- 3 Bad Men, directed by John Ford, starring George O'Brien

=== A ===
- The Adventures of Prince Achmed, directed by Lotte Reiniger – (Germany)
- Aloma of the South Seas (lost), directed by Maurice Tourneur, starring Gilda Gray, Warner Baxter and William Powell
- Ang Tatlong Hambog (The Three Humbugs), directed by José Nepomuceno, starring Dimples Cooper – (Philippines)

=== B ===
- Bardelys the Magnificent, directed by King Vidor, starring John Gilbert and Eleanor Boardman
- The Bat, directed by Roland West, based on the 1920 play by Mary Roberts Rinehart and Avery Hopwood
- Battling Butler, a Buster Keaton film
- Beau Geste, directed by Herbert Brenon, starring Ronald Colman
- The Bells, directed by James Young, starring Lionel Barrymore and Boris Karloff
- The Better 'Ole, directed by Charles Reisner, starring Syd Chaplin
- Beverly of Graustark, directed by Sidney Franklin, starring Marion Davies and Antonio Moreno
- The Black Pirate, directed by Albert Parker, starring Douglas Fairbanks and Billie Dove
- La Bohème, directed by King Vidor, starring Lillian Gish, John Gilbert and Renée Adorée
- Bride of Glomdal (Glomdalsbruden), directed by Carl Theodor Dreyer – (Denmark)
- Brown of Harvard, directed by Jack Conway, starring William Haines, Jack Pickford and Mary Brian
- Brudeferden i Hardanger (The Bridal Procession in Hardanger), directed by Rasmus Breistein – (Norway)

=== C ===
- Cab No. 13 (Einspanner Nr 13), directed by Michael Curtiz – (Germany)
- Cruise of the Jasper B, directed by James W. Horne, starring Rod La Rocque and Mildred Harris

=== D ===
- Dangerous Traffic, directed by Bennett Cohen, starring Ralph Bushman and Mildred Harris
- The Devil's Circus, directed by Benjamin Christensen, starring Norma Shearer
- The Devil's Wheel (Chyortovo koleso), directed by Grigori Kozintsev and Leonid Trauberg – (U.S.S.R.)
- Don Juan, directed by Alan Crosland, starring John Barrymore

=== F ===
- Falešná kočička aneb Když si žena umíní (Fake Woman, or When He is a She), directed by Svatopluk Innemann – (Czechoslovakia)
- Faust, directed by F. W. Murnau, starring Gösta Ekman and Emil Jannings – (Germany)
- Fool's Luck, directed by William Goodrich (Roscoe "Fatty" Arbukle), starring Lupino Lane
- For Heaven's Sake, directed by Sam Taylor, starring Harold Lloyd and Jobyna Ralston

=== G ===
- The General, directed by Clyde Bruckman and Buster Keaton, starring Buster Keaton
- The Golden Butterfly (Der goldene Schmetterling), directed by Michael Curtiz, starring Lili Damita – (Germany)
- The Great Gatsby (lost), directed by Herbert Brenon, starring Warner Baxter, Lois Wilson and William Powell
- The Great K & A Train Robbery, directed by Lewis Seiler, starring Tom Mix

=== H ===
- Hands Up!, directed by Clarence G. Badger, starring Raymond Griffith
- The Holy Mountain (Der heilige Berg), directed by Arnold Fanck, starring Leni Riefenstahl – (Germany)

=== I ===
- Irene, directed by Alfred E. Green, starring Colleen Moore
- It Must Be Love (lost), directed by Alfred E. Green, starring Colleen Moore

=== J ===
- The Johnstown Flood, directed by Irving Cummings, starring George O'Brien and Janet Gaynor

=== K ===
- Kid Boots, directed by Frank Tuttle, starring Eddie Cantor and Clara Bow

=== L ===
- The Last Days of Pompeii (Gli ultimi giorni di Pompei), directed by Carmine Gallone and Amleto Palermi – (Italy)
- Loetoeng Kasaroeng (lost), directed by L. Heuveldorp – (Dutch East Indies)
- Love's Berries (Yagodka lyubvi), directed by Alexander Dovzhenko – (U.S.S.R.)

=== M ===
- Madame Mystery, directed by Richard Wallace and Stan Laurel, starring Theda Bara and Oliver Hardy
- The Magician, directed by Rex Ingram, starring Alice Terry and Paul Wegener
- Manon Lescaut, directed by Arthur Robison, starring Lya De Putti – (Germany)
- Mare Nostrum, directed by Rex Ingram, starring Alice Terry and Antonio Moreno
- Ménilmontant, directed by Dimitri Kirsanoff – (France)
- Michel Strogoff, directed by Viktor Tourjansky, starring Ivan Mozzhukhin - (France)
- Midnight Faces, directed by Bennett Cohen, starring Francis X. Bushman Jr.
- Miss Mend, directed by Boris Barnet and Fedor Ozep – (U.S.S.R.)
- Mother (Mat), directed by Vsevolod Pudovkin – (U.S.S.R.)
- My Stars, directed by William Goodrich (Roscoe "Fatty" Arbuckle)

=== N ===
- Nana, directed by Jean Renoir – (France)
- Nell Gwyn, directed by Herbert Wilcox, starring Dorothy Gish – (GB)
- Nelson, directed by Walter Summers, starring Cedric Hardwicke – (GB)
- The Non-Stop Flight, directed by Emory Johnson

=== O ===
- Old Ironsides, directed by James Cruze, starring Charles Farrell, Esther Ralston, Wallace Beery and George Bancroft
- Orphan of Lowood (Die Waise von Lowood), directed by Curtis Bernhardt, based on the 1847 novel Jane Eyre by Charlotte Brontë – (Germany)
- The Overcoat (Shinel), directed by Grigori Kozintsev and Leonid Trauberg – (U.S.S.R.)

=== P ===
- A Page of Madness (Kurutta Ichipeiji), directed by Teinosuke Kinugasa – (Japan)

=== Q ===
- The Quarterback, directed by Fred C. Newmeyer, starring Richard Dix and Esther Ralston

=== R ===
- Rien que les heures (Nothing but Time), directed by Alberto Cavalcanti – (France)

=== S ===
- Scared Stiff, directed by James W. Horne
- The Scarlet Letter, directed by Victor Sjöström, starring Lillian Gish and Lars Hanson
- The Sea Beast, directed by Millard Webb, starring John Barrymore and Dolores Costello
- Secrets of a Soul (Geheimnisse einer Seele), directed by G. W. Pabst, starring Werner Krauss – (Germany)
- Shivering Spooks, directed by Robert F. McGowan, an Our Gang short
- The Show-Off, directed by Mal St. Clair, starring Lois Wilson, Ford Sterling and Louise Brooks
- The Son of the Sheik, directed by George Fitzmaurice, starring Rudolph Valentino and Vilma Bánky
- So This is Paris, directed by Ernst Lubitsch, starring Monte Blue
- So's Your Old Man, directed by Gregory La Cava, starring W. C. Fields
- The Sorrows of Satan, directed by D. W. Griffith, starring Adolphe Menjou and Ricardo Cortez, based on the 1895 novel by Marie Corelli
- Sparrows, directed by William Beaudine, starring Mary Pickford
- The Strong Man, directed by Frank Capra, starring Harry Langdon
- The Student of Prague (Der Student von Prag), directed by Henrik Galeen, starring Conrad Veidt and Werner Krauss – (Germany)
- Sweeney Todd, directed by George Dewhurst, based on the 1847 stage play The String of Pearls, or The Fiend of Fleet Street by George Dibdin-Pitt – (GB)

=== T ===
- Tartuffe (Herr Tartüff), directed by F. W. Murnau, starring Emil Jannings – (Germany)
- Tell It to the Marines, directed by George W. Hill, starring Lon Chaney, Eleanor Boardman and William Haines
- The Temptress, directed by Fred Niblo, starring Greta Garbo, Antonio Moreno and Lionel Barrymore
- The Three Million Trial (Процесс о трех миллионах), directed by Yakov Protazanov – (U.S.S.R.)
- Torrent, directed by Monta Bell, starring Ricardo Cortez and Greta Garbo
- Tramp, Tramp, Tramp, directed by Harry Edwards, starring Harry Langdon and Joan Crawford
- A Trip to Chinatown (lost), directed by Robert P. Kerr, starring Margaret Livingston
- The Triumph of the Rat, directed by Graham Cutts, starring Ivor Novello and Isabel Jeans – (GB)

=== U ===
- Unknown Treasures (lost), directed by Archie Mayo, based on the short story The House Behind the Hedge by Mary Spain Vigus

=== V ===
- The Volga Boatman, directed by Cecil B. DeMille, starring William Boyd

=== W ===
- What Price Glory?, directed by Raoul Walsh, starring Edmund Lowe, Victor McLaglen and Dolores del Río
- While London Sleeps (lost), directed by Howard Bretherton, starring Rin Tin Tin
- Whispering Wires, directed by Albert Ray, based on the novel by Henry Leverage
- The Winning of Barbara Worth, directed by Henry King, starring Ronald Colman, Vilma Bánky and Gary Cooper
- A Woman of the Sea (unreleased), directed by Josef von Sternberg, starring Edna Purviance

=== Y ===
- Young April, directed by Donald Crisp, starring Joseph Schildkraut and Bessie Love

== Comedy film series ==
- Our Gang (1922–1944)
- Harry Langdon (1924–1936)

== Animated short film series ==
- Felix the Cat (1919–1936)
- Koko the Clown (1919–1934)
- Alice Comedies
  - Alice on the Farm
  - Alice's Balloon Race
  - Alice's Orphan
  - Alice's Little Parade
  - Alice's Mysterious Mystery
  - Alice Charms the Fish
  - Alice's Monkey Business
  - Alice in the Wooly West
  - Alice the Fire Fighter
  - Alice Cuts the Ice
  - Alice Helps the Romance
  - Alice's Spanish Guitar
  - Alice's Brown Derby
  - Alice the Lumber Jack
- Koko's Song Car Tunes (1924–1927)
- Krazy Kat (1925–1940)
- Un-Natural History (1925–1927)
- Pete the Pup (1926–1927)

== Births ==
- January 1 – Zena Marshall, British actress (died 2009)
- January 2 – Hideyo Amamoto, Japanese actor (died 2003)
- January 6 – Mickey Hargitay, Hungarian-American actor and 1955 Mr. Universe (died 2006)
- January 14
  - Warren Mitchell, English actor (died 2015)
  - Tom Tryon, American actor and novelist (died 1991)
- January 15
  - Jack Eagle, American actor (died 2008)
  - Maria Schell, actress (died 2005)
- January 17 – Moira Shearer, actress and dancer (died 2006)
- January 18 – Salah Zulfikar, Egyptian actor and film producer (died 1993)
- January 19
  - George Ives, American character actor (died 2013)
  - Fritz Weaver, actor (died 2016)
- January 20 – Patricia Neal, actress (died 2010)
- January 21 - Steve Reeves, bodybuilder and actor (died 2000)
- January 25 – Ted White, American stuntman and actor (died 2022)
- January 30 – Ramesh Deo, Indian actor (died 2022)
- February 1 – Nancy Gates, actress (died 2019)
- February 2 – Lia Laats, actress (died 2004)
- February 5 - Stefan Gierasch, American actor (died 2014)
- February 8 – Allan Rich, American character actor (died 2020
- February 11 – Leslie Nielsen, actor and comedian (died 2010)
- February 16
  - David Frankham, retired British actor
  - John Schlesinger, director (died 2003)
- February 20 – Gillian Lynne, dancer, actress and choreographer (died 2018)
- February 22 – Kenneth Williams, British actor and comedian (died 1988)
- February 23 – Dorothy Steel, American actress (died 2021)
- February 26 - Doris Belack, American character actress (died 2011)
- March 1
  - Robert Clary, French-American actor and singer (died 2022)
  - Cesare Danova, Italian actor (died 1992)
- March 5
  - Craig Hill, American film actor (died 2014)
  - Joan Shawlee, American actress (died 1987)
- March 6 – Andrzej Wajda, director (died 2016)
- March 13 - Lenny Montana, American actor (died 1992)
- March 16 – Jerry Lewis, American actor (died 2017)
- March 18 – Peter Graves, American actor (died 2010)
- March 19 – Bill Henderson, American actor and jazz singer (died 2016)
- March 21 – André Delvaux, Belgian director (died 2002)
- March 25 – Gene Shalit, American film critic (died 2026)
- March 30
  - Sydney Chaplin, American actor (died 2009)
  - Peter Marshall, American game show host, television and radio personality, singer and actor (died 2024)
- April 3
  - Timothy Bateson, English actor (died 2009)
  - Andrew Keir, Scottish actor (died 1997)
- April 5 – Roger Corman, American director (died 2024)
- April 7
  - Prem Nazir, Indian actor (died 1989)
  - Gloria Warren, American actress (died 2021)
- April 8
  - Shecky Greene, American comedian (died 2023)
  - Shirley Mills, American actress (died 2010)
- April 12 – Jane Withers, American actress (died 2021)
- April 14 – Gloria Jean, American actress and singer (died 2018)
- April 22 – Charlotte Rae, American actress (died 2018)
- April 24 - Marilyn Erskine, American actress
- April 25 – Patricia Castell, Argentine actress (died 2013)
- April 27 - Leo De Lyon, American actor (died 2021)
- April 29 - Leonard Fenton, English actor and director (died 2022)
- April 30 – Cloris Leachman, American actress (died 2021)
- May 3 - Ann B. Davis, American actress (died 2014)
- May 4
  - Enzo Garinei, Italian actor (died 2022)
  - Christine White, American actress (died 2013)
- May 5 – Bing Russell, American actor, minor-league baseball club owner (died 2003)
- May 7 – Val Bisoglio, American character actor (died 2021)
- May 8
  - David Attenborough, English broadcaster
  - David Hurst, German actor (died 2019)
  - Don Rickles, American comedian and actor (died 2017)
- May 10
  - Tichi Wilkerson Kassel, American film personality, publisher of The Hollywood Reporter (died 2004)
  - Vladimir Tatosov, Russian actor (died 2021)
- May 11
  - Yvonne Furneaux, French actress (died 2024)
  - Frank Thring, Australian actor (died 1994)
- May 12 – Marilyn Knowlden, American child actress (died 2025)
- May 17 - Maria Duval, Argentine actress (died 2022)
- May 19 - Michelle Marquais, French actress (died 2022)
- May 24 - Stanley Baxter, Scottish actor and comedian (died 2025)
- May 25 – Claude Akins, American actor (died 1994)
- May 27 – Margaret Barton, British actress
- May 30 – Nina Agapova, Russian actress (died 2021)
- June 1
  - Andy Griffith, American actor (died 2012)
  - Marilyn Monroe, American actress (died 1962)
  - Aubrey Morris, British actor (died 2015)
- June 2 – Milo O'Shea, Irish actor (died 2013)
- June 5 – Lu Leonard, American actress (died 2004)
- June 9
  - Mona Freeman, American actress, painter (died 2014)
  - Georgia Holt, American actress, model (died 2022)
- June 10
  - June Haver, American actress, singer, dancer (died 2005)
  - Lionel Jeffries, English actor, director and screenwriter (died 2010)
- June 13 – Paul Lynde, American comedian and actor (died 1982)
- June 15 - Jesús Guzmán, Spanish actor (died 2023)
- June 17 - Elio Pandolfi, Italian actor, radio personality and voice actor (died 2021)
- June 22 - Doreen Mantle, British actress (died 2023)
- June 28 – Mel Brooks, American actor, comedian and filmmaker
- July 5 – Diana Lynn, American actress (died 1971)
- July 10
  - Carleton Carpenter, American actor, magician, author and songwriter (died 2022)
  - Fred Gwynne, American actor (died 1993)
- July 12 - Sandy Ward, American actor (died 2005)
- July 14 – Harry Dean Stanton, American character actor (died 2017)
- July 15 - Albert Popwell, American actor (died 1999)
- July 20 – Diane Hart, English actress, inventor (died 2002)
- July 21 – Norman Jewison, Canadian director (died 2024)
- July 22 – Bryan Forbes, English director (died 2013)
- July 23 - Rae Allen, American actress, director and singer (died 2022)
- July 26 – James Best, American actor (died 2015)
- August 3 – Rona Anderson, Scottish actress (died 2013)
- August 6 - Frank Finlay, British actor (died 2016)
- August 7 – Stan Freberg, American voice actor, author, radio personality and comedian (died 2015)
- August 8 – Richard Anderson, American actor (died 2017)
- August 11 - Charles Cooper, American actor (died 2013)
- August 12
  - Douglas Croft, American actor (died 1963)
  - John Derek, American actor, filmmaker and photographer (died 1998)
- August 14 - Margot Benacerraf, Venezuelan film director (died 2024)
- August 18 - John Finnegan, American actor (died 2012)
- August 28 - Wendy Playfair, Australian actress (died 2026)
- August 29 – Betty Lynn, American actress (died 2021)
- September 7 - Don Messick, American voice actor (died 1997)
- September 16 – Tommy Bond, American actor, director, producer and writer (died 2005)
- September 19 – James Lipton, American actor, screenwriter and presenter (died 2020)
- September 23 - Henry Silva, American actor (died 2022)
- September 25
  - John Ericson, German-American actor (died 2020)
  - Aldo Ray, American actor (died 1991)
- September 26 - Julie London, American singer, actress (died 2000)
- September 28 - Ralph Ahn, American actor (died 2022)
- October 10 - Richard Jaeckel, American character actor (died 1992)
- October 15
  - Jeffrey Hayden, American director and producer (died 2016)
  - Jean Peters, American actress (died 2000)
- October 17
  - Julie Adams, American actress (died 2019)
  - Beverly Garland, American actress (died 2008)
- October 18 – Klaus Kinski, German actor (died 1991)
- October 21 - Jack Taylor, American actor (died 2026)
- October 25 – Biff McGuire, American actor (died 2021)
- November 1 – Betsy Palmer, American actress (died 2015)
- November 4 – Laurence Rosenthal, American film composer
- November 13 – Don Gordon, American actor (died 2017)
- November 17 – Robert Brown, American actor (died 2022)
- November 20 – Judith Magre, French actress
- November 25
  - Jeffrey Hunter, American actor and producer (died 1969)
  - Terry Kilburn, English-American actor
  - Harry Landis, British actor and director (died 2022)
- November 26 – Ed Williams, American actor (died 2025)
- November 30 – Richard Crenna, American actor (died 2003)
- December 1
  - Allyn Ann McLerie, American actress (died 2018)
  - Robert Symonds, American actor (died 2007)
- December 10 – Harry Fowler, English character actor (died 2012)
- December 11 – Richard Devon, American actor (died 2010)
- December 17 - Ron Graham, British-Australian character actor (died 2020)
- December 18 – Walter Lassally, German-born British-Greek cinematographer (died 2017)
- December 27 – Jerome Courtland, American actor, director, producer (died 2012)

== Deaths ==
- January 30
  - Harold M. Shaw, film director (born 1877)
  - Barbara La Marr, actress (born 1896)
- February 6 – Carrie Clark Ward, actress (born 1862)
- April 20 – Billy Quirk, actor (born 1873)
- March 2 – Victory Bateman, actress (born 1865)
- May 7 - Lillian Lawrence, actress (born 1868)
- July 22 – Willard Louis, actor (born 1882)
- July 23 - Charles Avery
- August 22 – Joe Moore, actor, brother of Mary Moore, Matt Moore, Owen Moore & Tom Moore
- August 23 – Rudolph Valentino, actor (born 1895)
- August 30 – Eddie Lyons, American actor (born 1886)
- September 8 – Kisaburo Kurihara, Japanese actor (born 1885)
- September 11 – Matsunosuke Onoe, actor (born 1875)
- October 31 – Harry Houdini, magician & actor (born 1874)
- November 7 – Tom Forman, silent film actor & director (born 1893)
- November 8 – James K Hackett, stage & silent film actor (born 1869)
- November 17 – Harold Vosburgh, silent film actor (born 1870)

== Film debuts ==
- Richard Alexander – Brown of Harvard
- Harry Beresford – The Quarterback
- Margaret Bert – The Blackbird
- Eric Blore – The Great Gatsby
- El Brendel – The Campus Flirt
- Frank Darien – Old Ironsides
- Roland Drew – Fascinating Youth
- Josephine Dunn – Fascinating Youth
- Jean Fenwick – Fascinating Youth
- Dwight Frye – Exit Smiling
- Cedric Hardwicke – Nelson
- Doris Hill – Tom and His Pals
- Russell Hopton – Ella Cinders
- Marcia Mae Jones – Mannequin
- Nancy Kelly – The Untamed Lady
- Natalie Kingston – Wet Paint
- Elissa Landi – London
- Ivan Lebedeff – Fine Manners
- Jack Luden – Fascinating Youth
- Barton MacLane – The Quarterback
- John Merton – The Quarterback
- Nell O'Day – Twinkletoes
- Kathleen O'Malley – My Old Dutch
- Franklin Pangborn – Exit Smiling
- Elizabeth Patterson – The Boy Friend
- Jack Pennick – The Blue Eagle
- Walter Pidgeon – Mannequin
- Nina Quartero – The Sorrows of Satan
- Buddy Rogers – Fascinating Youth
- Sylvia Sidney – The Sorrows of Satan
- Charles Starrett – The Quarterback
- Arthur Stone – The Girl from Montmartre
- Thelma Todd – Fascinating Youth
- Maidel Turner – The Boy Friend
- John Wayne – Brown of Harvard
