= Vera Georgiyevna Orlova =

Russian actress (1894–1977)

- Born: May 27, 1894
- Died: September 28, 1977 (aged 83); Moscow, USSR
- Occupation: Actress

Vera Geogriyevna Orlova (Russian: Ве́ра Гео́ргиевна Орло́ва; May 27, 1894 – September 28, 1977), married Arenskaya (Аренская), was a Russian film actress, who garnered fame during the late Imperial Russian and early Soviet eras.

== Biography ==
After graduating from the Women's Gymnasium, she worked as a clerk in the Moscow railway office, while taking private acting lessons from the actor and teacher of the Moscow Art Theater N. O. Massalitinov. In 1913–1915, she studied at the Moscow Art Theater school. She continued working there as an actress until 1924, when she transferred to the Moscow Art Theater-II, where she continued to work until 1936. From 1945–1951, she worked at the State Theater of Film Actors.

She began acting in films in 1915, and during her three years of work in pre-revolutionary cinema, she appeared in thirty films. Her first role was the leading role of a peasant girl in the film "The Seagull" (based on the romance of those years "Here the morning flared up, a seagull flies over the lake"). The first film director she collaborated with was Yakov Protazanov, and her partner was Ivan Mozzhukhin. After Protazanov's departure, Orlova worked on several films with Alexander Ivanovsky, and after Yakov Alexandrovich's return from emigration, she played a supporting role in his first Soviet film, Aelita.

She died on September 28, 1977 in Moscow and was buried at the Novodevichy Cemetery.

The Russian State Archive of Literature and Art contains documents related to V. G. Orlova.

== Selected filmography ==
- 1916: The Queen of Spades, as Lise
- 1917: Satan Triumphant, as Inga
- 1917: Father Sergius, as the daughter of a merchant
- 1924: Aelita, as Masha
- 1924: The Power of Darkness, as Anjutka
- 1926: Prostitute, as Nadezhda
- 1961: When the Trees Were Tall, as a watchwoman
