= Nikolai Saltykov (actor) =

- Born: Nikolai Saltykov; 1886
- Died: 1927 (aged 40–41)
- Occupations: Actor, director
- Years active: 1915–1926

Nikolai Saltykov (Russian: Николай Александрович Салтыков) was a Russian Imperial and Soviet actor and director.

== Selected filmography ==
- 1915 — Antichrist
- 1915 — Czar Ivan the Terrible
- 1923 — Locksmith and Chancellor
- 1924 — Story of Seven Who Were Hanged
- 1926 — The Bay of Death
