= Sofia Jozeffi =

Russian actress

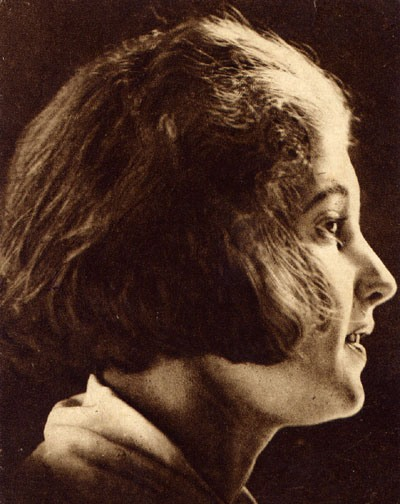
- Soviet film actress
- Born: Sofia Jozeffi; 1906
- Died: 1997 (aged 90–91)
- Occupation: actress
- Years active: 1923–1934

Sofia Jozeffi (Russian: София Жозеффи; born София Львовна Липкина) was a Soviet film actress.

== Selected filmography ==
- 1923 — Red Devils
- 1923 — Legenda o Devichyey Bashne
