= P.K.P. (Pilsudski Bought Petliura) =

1926 Soviet film

- Russian: П.К.П. (Пилсудский купил Петлюру)
- Directed by: Aksel Lundin; Georgi Stabovoi
- Written by: Georgi Stabovoi
- Starring: Teodor Brainin; Dmitri Erdman; Sergei Kalinin; Ivan Kapralov; Nikolai Kuchinsky
- Cinematography: I. Gudima; Fridrikh Verigo-Darovsky
- Release date: 1926
- Country: Soviet Union

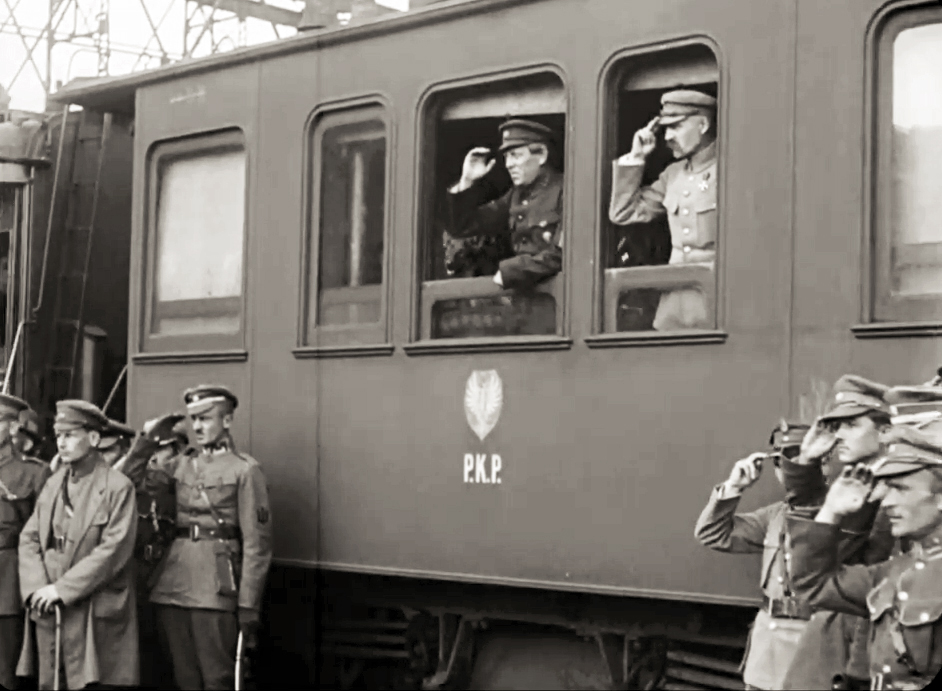
Józef Piłsudski and Symon Petliura in a wagon of the Polish State Railways (P.K.P.) train, Vinnytsia 1920

P.K.P. (Pilsudski Bought Petliura) (Russian: П.К.П. (Пилсудский купил Петлюру), romanized: P.K.P. (Pilsudsky kupil Petlyuru)) is a 1926 Soviet film directed by Aksel Lundin and Georgi Stabovoi.

== Plot ==
In the early 1920s, Symon Petliura negotiates in Poland for a joint invasion of Ukraine with Polish forces. The "allied" interventionists openly plunder Ukrainian peasants, sending trains loaded with grain, sugar, and other goods to Poland. Ukrainian villagers mockingly reinterpret the acronym PKP (standing for Polish State Railways) as "Piłsudski bought Petliura." Against the Polish invaders stands the cavalry of Grigory Kotovsky, which defeats the enemy forces and drives them back to Poland.

Petliura's influence among emigrants wanes, and leadership passes to General Yurko Tyutyunnyk, who heads an insurgent staff. Tyutyunnyk (played by Yuriy Tyutyunnyk himself, who had returned to the Soviet Union and been rehabilitated) organizes officers from internment camps, under the direction of a Polish spy, Dombrówska, to infiltrate the Ukrainian SSR. These officers are issued "pink tickets," which serve as identification for Polish spies.

Meanwhile, in peaceful Soviet Ukraine, nationalist underground groups conspire against the government. Meeting secretly in the Saint Sophia Cathedral in Kyiv, they form the "All-Ukrainian Central Insurgent Committee." Their units attack villages, railroad stations, and Kombeds (committees of poor peasants), burning telegraph poles and infrastructure. However, Kotovsky's cavalry crushes these insurrectionists.

The underground sends a courier, Fedor Dnistro (alias Ataman Nakonechny), abroad to meet with Petliura and Tyutyunnyk. They task him with organizing an uprising in Ukraine to coincide with a planned invasion. However, a Bolshevik agent infiltrates the network and exposes the plot. Tyutyunnyk launches a new campaign against Ukraine but is intercepted and defeated by Kotovsky's forces. The anti-Bolshevik rebellion is decisively suppressed.

== Production ==
Originally envisioned as a two-part film showcasing the work of the Cheka, the production faced challenges. Vsevolod Balitsky, the head of the Ukrainian Cheka, opposed revealing the organization's methods. As a result, the screenplay was heavily edited, and the film was released as a single part. Nevertheless, the movie was based on accurate historical data.

== Cast ==
- Nikolai Kuchinsky as Symon Petliura
- Matvei Lyarov as Józef Piłsudski
- Yuriy Tyutyunnyk as Yuriy Tyutyunnyk (himself)
- Dmitri Erdman as Nakonechny
- Teodor Brainin as colonel Pulkovsky
- Sergei Kalinin as Petrenko
- Ivan Kapralov
- Vasili Lyudvinsky as Peasant boy
- Nikolai Nademsky
- Ivan Sizov as Nationalist underground
- M. Smolensky as Petliura general
