= The Crime of Shirvanskaya =

1926 film

- Directed by: Ivane Perestiani
- Cinematography: Aleksandre Digmelovi
- Edited by: Lev Push
- Production company: Sakhkinmretsvi
- Release date: 29 September 1926
- Running time: 65 minutes
- Country: Soviet Union
- Languages: Russian, Silent; Georgian intertitles

The Crime of Shirvanskaya (Georgian: Shirvanskaias danashauli, Russian: Преступление княжны Ширванской, romanized: Prestuplenie kniazhny Shirvanskoy) is a 1926 Soviet silent action adventure film directed by Ivane Perestiani.

== Cast ==
- Maria Shirai as Princess Shirvanskaya
- Pavel Yesikovsky as Misha
- Sofia Jozeffi as Duniasha
- Kador Ben-Salim as Tom Jackson
- Aleksandr Shirai as Douglas McLin
- Marius Jakobini as Ialmar Rumanesku
- Svetlana Luiks as Oqsana
- N. Lasmozi as Zina Khanum
- R. Japaridze as Levkoeva
- Tamar Bakradze as Wife of officier Mironov

== Bibliography ==
- Rollberg, Peter. Historical Dictionary of Russian and Soviet Cinema. Scarecrow Press, 2008.
