= Ivan Perestiani =

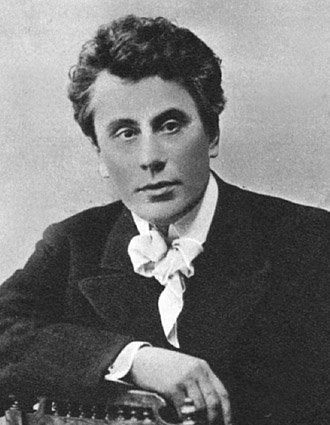
- Ivan Perestiani (c. 1890)
- Born: Ivan Nikolayevich Perestiani; 13 April [O.S. 1 April] 1870; Taganrog, Russian Empire
- Died: 14 May 1959 (aged 89); Moscow, Soviet Union
- Occupations: Film director, screenwriter, actor
- Years active: 1916–1947

Ivan Nikolayevich Perestiani (also Ivane, Georgian: ივანე პერესტიანი; Russian: Иван Николаевич Перестиани; 13 April [O.S. 1 April] 1870 — 14 May 1959) was a Georgian/Soviet film director, screenwriter and actor, and People's Artist of the Georgian SSR (1949). He was of Kefalonian Greek descent.

== Biography ==
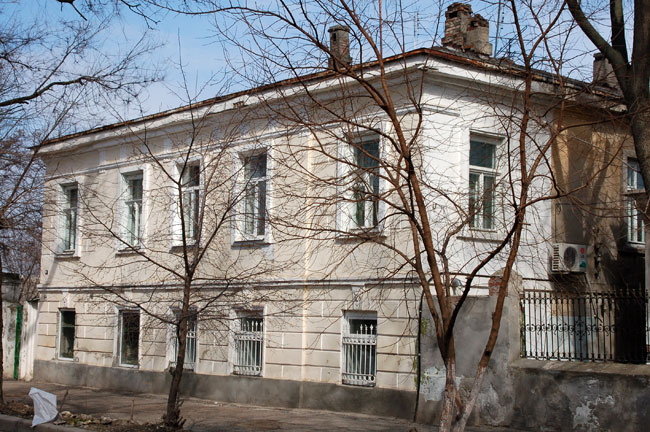
The Birthhouse of Ivan Perestiani in Taganrog.© TaganrogCity.Com

Ivan Perestiani was born in the city of Taganrog into the family of Nikolay Afanasyevich Perestiani on 13 April [O.S. 1 April] 1870. His first actor's experience was onstage of Taganrog Theatre under name of Ivan Nevedomov in 1886. The first movie roles played by Perestiani were Grif starogo bortsa a.k.a. Griffon of an Old Warrior and Zhizn za zhizn a.k.a. A Life for a Life in 1916. During Russian Civil War, he wrote scenario for several short films.

In 1920 Ivan Perestiani moved to Tbilisi, becoming one of the founding fathers of Georgian cinematography. In 1921, he staged the first Soviet Georgian historical and revolutionary film Arsen Jorjiashvili a.k.a. The Murder of General Gryaznov, where he also played the role of Vorontsov-Dashkov. The silent black-and-white movie Tsiteli eshmakunebi (Russian title Krasnye dyavolyata (Red Devils)) that he staged in 1923 basing on the novel by Pavel Blyakhin is considered as one of his best film director's works.

Perestiani worked for several years at Odesa Cinema Studio, Armenfilm studio, and finally returned to Tbilisi in 1939. For his achievements he was awarded with three orders and the honorary title of People's Artist of the Georgian SSR in 1949. He died in Moscow on 14 May 1959.

== Filmography ==
=== Director ===
- Love - Hate - Death (Любовь - Ненависть - Смерть) (1918)
- Eva (1918)
- Word of Honour (Честное слово) (1918)
- Father and Son (Отец и сын) (1919)
- In the Days of Struggle (В дни борьбы) (1920)
- The Murder of General Gryaznov (Arsena Jorjiashvili) (1921)
- The Suram Fortress (Suramis tsikhe, Сурамская крепость) (1922)
- Man Is Man's Enemy (Katsi katsistvis mgelia, Человек человеку волк) (1923)
- Red Devils (Tsiteli eshmakunebi, Красные дьяволята) (1923)
- Three Lives (Sami sitsotskhle, Три жизни) (1924)
- The Case of Tariel Mklavadze (Tariel mklavadzis mkvlelobis saqme, Дело Тариэла Мклавадзе) (1925)
- Savur-Mohyla (Савур-могила) (1926)
- The Crime of Shirvanskaya (Shirvanskayas danashauli, Преступление княжны Ширванской) (1926)
- The Punishment of Shirvanskaya (Sasdjeli, Наказание княжны Ширванской) (1926)
- Ilan-dili (Иллан Дилли) (1926)
- Nest of Wasps (Krazanas bude, Осиное гнездо) (1927)
- In the Bog (Gaplangva, В трясине) (1928)
- Scandal (1929)
- Zamallu (Замаллу) (1929)
- Light and Shadows (Свет и тени) (1931)
- Anush (Ануш) (1931)
- Idler (Лодырь) (1932)
- Two Friends (Ori megobari) (1937)

=== Actor ===
- Akakis akvani(1947) .... Director of Gymnasium
- Davit Guramishvili (1946) .... Minister
- David Bek (1944) .... Nuncio of Pope
- Giorgi Saakadze (1942) .... Russian Ambassador
- Diadi gantiadi (1938) .... General
- Arsena (1937) .... Baron Rozen
- Sev tevi tak (1930) .... General
- Man Is Man's Enemy (1923) .... Carter
- Arsena Jorjiashvili (1921) .... Vorontsov-Dashkov
- Khveska (1920) .... Doctor
- Otetz i syn (1919)
- Chestnoe slovo (1918)
- Eva (1918)
- Liubov - nenavist - smert (1918)
- Revolutsioner (1917) .... Granddad, an old revolutionary
- Umirayushchii Lebed a.k.a. The Dying Swan (1917) .... Glinskiy's friend
- Grif starogo bortsa (1916) ... a.k.a. Griffon of an Old Warrior
- Zhizn za zhizn a.k.a. A Life for a Life (1916) .... Zhurov, the merchant
- Chess of Life (1916) .... Baron Kering

=== Writer ===
- Porposti (1941)
- Ori megobari (1937) ... a.k.a. Dva druga (Russian title) ... a.k.a. Two Friends (English title)
- Anush (1931)
- Krazanas bude (1927)
- Sami sitsotskhle (1924)
- Suramis tsikhe (1922) ... a.k.a. The Suram Fortress (literal English title)
- Arsena Jorjiashvili (1921)
- V dni borbi (1920) ... a.k.a. In the Days of Struggle (English title)
- Chestnoe slovo (1918)
- Revolutsioner (1917)
- Grif starogo bortsa (1916)
