= List of Soviet films of 1930 =

A list of films produced in the Soviet Union in 1930 (see 1930 in film).

== 1930 ==
| Title | Russian title | Director | Cast | Genre | Notes |
|---|---|---|---|---|---|
| Avenger | Мститель | Boris Shpis | | | |
| Bread | Хлеб | Mykola Shpykovskyi | | Drama | |
| Cities and Years | Города и годы | Yevgeni Chervyakov | Bernhard Goetzke | Drama | |
| The Civil Servant | Государственный чиновник | Ivan Pyryev | Maksim Shtraukh | Comedy | |
| Earth | Зeмля | Aleksandr Dovzhenko | Stepan Shkurat, Semyon Svashenko, Yuliya Solntseva | Drama | |
| The Earth Is Thirsty | Земля жаждет | Yuli Raizman | Y. Agramov | Drama | |
| The Ghost That Never Returns | Привидение, которое не возвращается | Abram Room | Boris Ferdinandov, A. Filippov, Karl Gurnyak | Drama | |
| Judas | Иуда | Evgeniy Ivanov-Barkov | Aleksandr Antonov | Drama | |
| The Last Port | Последнии порта | Arnold Kordyum | Pyotr Masokha, Sergei Minin, Ladislav Golichenko | Drama | |
| The Plan for Great Works | План великих работ | Abram Room | | Documentary | |
| Salt for Svanetia | Соль Сванетии | Mikhail Kalatozov | | Documentary | |
| A Simple Case | Простой случай | Vsevolod Pudovkin, Mikhail Doller | Aleksandr Baturin | Romance | |
| The Sleeping Beauty | Спящая красавица | Georgi Vasilyev, Sergei Vasilyev | Konstantin Mukhutdinov | Drama | |
| St. Jorgens's Day | Праздник Святого Йоргена | Yakov Protazanov | Igor Ilyinsky, Anatoli Ktorov | Comedy | |
| Wind in the Face | Ветер в лицо | Iosif Kheifits, Aleksandr Zarkhi | Aleksandr Melnikov | Drama | |

== See also ==
- 1930 in the Soviet Union
