= 17th Venice International Film Festival =

Italian film festival in 1956

- Location: Venice, Italy
- Founded: 1932
- Festival date: 28 August – 9 September 1956
- Website: Website

Venice Film Festival chronology
- 18th 16th

The 17th annual Venice International Film Festival was held from 28 August to 9 September 1956.

No Golden Lion was awarded, the international jury was unable to decide the winner, after a tie in the voting between The Burmese Harp and Calle Mayor, the award was declared void for the first (and only) time ever.

== Jury ==
- John Grierson, British filmmaker - Jury President
- André Bazin, French film critic
- G.B. Cavallaro, Italian film critic
- Fridrikh Ermler, Soviet filmmaker and actor
- James Quinn, British producer and exhibitor
- Kiyohiko Ushihara, Japanese filmmaker
- Luchino Visconti, Italian filmmaker

== Official Sections ==
The following films were selected to be screened:

=== Main Competition ===
English title	Original title	Director(s)	Production country
Attack		Robert Aldrich	United States
The Awakening	Suor Letizia	Mario Camerini	Italy
Bigger Than Life		Nicholas Ray	United States
The Burmese Harp	ビルマの竪琴	Kon Ichikawa	Japan
Bus Stop		Joshua Logan	United States
The Captain from Köpenick	Der Hauptmann von Köpenick	Helmut Käutner	West Germany
Empire in the Sun	L'impero del sole	Enrico Gras	Italy
Gervaise		René Clément	France
The Immortal Garrison	Бессмертный гарнизон	Zakhar Agranenko, Eduard Tisse	Soviet Union
Main Street	Calle Mayor	Juan Antonio Bardem	Spain
The Ogre of Athens	Ο Δράκος	Nikos Koundouros	Greece
The Rocket from Calabuch	Calabuch	Luis García Berlanga	Spain
Street of Shame	赤線地帯	Kenji Mizoguchi	Japan
Torero!		Carlos Velo	Mexico
La Traversée de Paris		Claude Autant-Lara	France

=== Out of Competition ===
English title	Original title	Director(s)	Production country
Big and Small	Veliki i mali	Vladimir Pogačić	Yugoslavia
Bus Stop		Joshua Logan	United States

== Official Awards ==
=== Main Competition ===
- Volpi Cup for Best Actor: Bourvil for La Traversée de Paris
- Volpi Cup for Best Actress: Maria Schell for Gervaise
- Special Mentions:
  - Street of Shame by Kenji Mizoguchi
  - Heinz Rühmann for The Captain from Köpenick
  - Anna Magnani for The Awakening
  - Franco Bernetti, Mario Craveri, Ubaldo Marelli, Giovanni Raffaldi for Empire in the Sun
  - Torero! by Carlos Velo
  - The Immortal Garrison by Zakhar Agranenko & Eduard Tisse
  - Betsy Blair for Calle Mayor
  - The Burmese Harp by Kon Ichikawa
  - Calle Mayor by Juan Antonio Bardem

== Independent Awards ==
=== New Cinema Award ===
- Best Film: Calle Mayor by Juan Antonio Bardem
- Best Actor: Heinz Rühmann for The Captain from Köpenick
- Best Actress: Maria Schell for Gervaise

=== San Giorgio Prize ===
- The Burmese Harp by Kon Ichikawa

=== FIPRESCI Prize ===
- Calle Mayor by Juan Antonio Bardem
- Gervaise by René Clément

=== OCIC Award ===
- Calabuch by Luis García Berlanga
  - Honorable Mention: The Burmese Harp by Kon Ichikawa

=== Pasinetti Award ===
- Attack by Robert Aldrich
