= Silvery Dust =

- Directed by: Pavel Armand; Abram Room
- Written by: Aleksandr Filimonov; August Jakobson
- Cinematography: Eduard Tisse
- Music by: Mikhail Chulaki
- Production company: Mosfilm
- Release date: 19 October 1953
- Running time: 102 minutes
- Country: Soviet Union
- Language: Russian

Silvery Dust (Russian: Серебристая пыль, romanized: Serebristaya pyl) is a 1953 Soviet science fiction drama film directed by Pavel Armand and Abram Room and starring Mikhail Bolduman, Sofiya Pilyavskaya and Valentina Ushakova.

== Synopsis ==
The film takes place in the United States. Samuel Steal is a scientist with only one life purpose - to become rich. The professor invents a powerful new weapon of mass destruction; a deadly radioactive silver-gray powder. To possess Steal's invention, a struggle between two military-industrial behemoth trusts involving gangsters begins.

== Cast ==
- Mikhail Bolduman as Samuel Steal
- Sofiya Pilyavskaya as Doris Steal
- Valentina Ushakova as Jen O'Connel
- Nikolai Timofeyev as Allan O'Connel
- Vsevolod Larionov as Harry Steal
- Vladimir Belokurov as Upton Bruce
- Rostislav Plyatt as McKennedy
- Grigori Kirillov as Dr. Kurt Schneider
- Aleksandr Khanov as Charles Armstrong
- Valeriy Lekarev as Gideon Smith
- Gennadi Yudin as Dick Jones
- Zana Zanoni as Mary Robinson
- D. Kolmogorov as Ben Robinson
- Aleksandr Pelevin as Joe Twist
- Lidiya Smirnova as Flossy Beit
- Osip Abdulov as Sheriff Smiles
- Sergei Tsenin
- Nadir Malishevsky
- Aleksandr Shatov
- Vladimir Savelev
- Yuri Chekulayev
- Arkadi Tsinman
- Vladimir Sez
- Isaak Leongarov
- A. Arkadyeva
- N. Nazaren
- Robert Ross
- Konstantin Nemolyayev as Johnny
- Fyodor Odinokov as Sheriff's Assistant
- Leonid Pirogov as Detained Unemployed
- Anna Zarzhitskaya as Deadley's Wife

== Bibliography ==
- Liehm, Mira; Liehm, Antonín J. (1977). The Most Important Art: Eastern European Film After 1945. University of California Press. ISBN 9780520041288 – via Internet Archive.
