= Pordenone Silent Film Festival =

Giornate del cinema muto
- Location: Pordenone, Italy
- Founded: 1982
- Language: International
- Website: http://www.giornatedelcinemamuto.it/en/

Le Giornate del cinema muto (referred to in English as Pordenone Silent Film Festival) is an annual festival of silent film held in October in Pordenone, northern Italy. It is the first, largest and most important international festival dedicated to silent film and also is present in the list of the top 50 unmissable film festivals in the world according to Variety. The Pordenone Silent Film Festival is a non-profit association, whose president is Livio Jacob. The director from 1997 until 2015 was David Robinson. In 2016, Jay Weissberg became director. Other members of the festival board are Paolo Cherchi Usai, Lorenzo Codelli, Piero Colussi, Luciano De Giusti, Carlo Montanaro, Piera Patat.

== History ==
Created in 1982 as a collaborative effort between La Cineteca del Friuli in Gemona and the Cinemazero filmclub in Pordenone, the Giornate del Cinema Muto, aka Pordenone Silent Film Festival, has established itself as the leading international event dedicated to the preservation, diffusion, and study of the first thirty years of cinema.

The first retrospective, focussing on French comedian Max Linder, was organized as a true labor of love, with a shoestring budget and an audience of eight patrons. Today, the screenings are attended by several hundreds of people from across the world, ranging from academics, archivists and critics to private enthusiasts and collectors, who gather for a weekly marathon of screenings.

From 1985 to 1998, the festival's venue was the Cinema Verdi in Pordenone, a picture palace from the great post-war era of Italian cinema-going. Following the local authorities’ decision to demolish the Verdi, in 1999 the Giornate moved to the Teatro Zancanaro in Sacile (15 km from Pordenone), a well-equipped modern auditorium behind the older facade of a theatre which has been presenting films since 1911. In October 2007 the festival moved back to Pordenone and to the new Verdi theatre.

Since its inception, the Pordenone Silent Film Festival has covered all aspects of early film history, ranging from the classical Hollywood cinema to avant-garde and animation. “These gatherings,” write Kristin Thompson and David Bordwell in Film History: An Introduction, “have revolutionized the study of silent cinema... The Silent Film Festival has helped emphasize how crucial the preservation and availability of early films are to our knowledge of cinema history.”

Over the years of its existence, the festival has stimulated and assisted the process of recovering and restoring the film heritage, which is the vital role of the world's film archives. Thanks to the extraordinary periodic meeting of expertise at the Giornate, lost films have been rediscovered, orphan reels have been identified, and chance personal encounters have led to restoration projects.

== Musical accompaniments ==
The quality of film presentation is enhanced by the music performed for each program. A staff of highly specialised pianists from different countries play improvised, original or contemporary music throughout the festival, while groups and full orchestras perform on special musical events. Daily lessons for aspiring silent film accompanists given by the Giornate's musicians - also testify to the importance of music to the festival.

== Content and initiatives of the Festival ==
Another annual festival feature is the Collegium, where twelve young people sit down with groups of experts in various fields of the study and techniques of film history and conservation. An annual prize, the Jean Mitry Award, is given every year to scholars and archivists in recognition of their work in preserving, interpreting and promoting the silent film heritage. The current prestige of the Silent Film Festival derives also from its books, programs and brochures, many of which are regarded today as basic reference works in the field.

== Works shown ==
The following is a list of some works that have been shown at the festival, as well as themes engaged and directors featured, in addition to showing the complete works of D.W. Griffith, which are being shown in 12 parts, 1997–2008.

- 1999: Nordic cinema of the 1920s, Georges Méliès, Alfred Hitchcock, Erich von Stroheim
- 2000: Louis Feuillade, German avant garde, Walter Lantz, "The world of 1900"
- 2001: Abel Gance's Napoléon reconstructed by Kevin Brownlow; Finis Terrae by Jean Epstein; Japanese silent film
- 2002: "Funny Ladies", Italian avant garde, Swiss silent film, Jenő Janovics
- 2003: Merian C. Cooper and Ernest B. Schoedsack, Ivan Mosjoukine, Thai silent film, Celebrating a century of flight
- 2004: Dziga Vertov, British film of the 1920s, The General by Buster Keaton
- 2005: Japanese silent film, André Antoine, Au Bonheur des dames by Julien Duvivier, Flesh and the Devil by Clarence Brown, The Scarlet Letter by Victor Sjöström, Jerry the Tyke
- 2006: Silly Symphonies by Walt Disney, films of the Nordisk Film Company, Cabiria by Giovanni Pastrone, Thomas H. Ince, "Cinema and magic"
- 2007: "The Other Weimar" - German silent films, René Clair, Ladislas Starewitch, Chicago by Frank Urson, À propos de Nice by Jean Vigo, Pandora's Box by Georg Wilhelm Pabst
- 2009: The Merry Widow by Erich Von Stroheim, Sherlock and Beyond, J'Accuse by Abel Gance, Jugoslovenska kinoteka 60, Carmen by Jacques Feyder, Italo Pacchioni.
- 2010: Wings by William Wellman, Battleship Potemkin by Sergei M. Eisenstein, A Thief Catcher (1914), Le Miracle de loups by Raymond Bernard, Moana by Robert Flaherty, Three Masters of Shochiku (Yasujirō Shimazu, Hiroshi Shimizu, Kiyohiko Ushihara), The Soviet Cinema of Abram Room and Mikhail Kalatozov, Il Fuoco of Giovanni Pastrone, Hævnens nat of Benjamin Christensen, Drifters by John Grierson.
- 2011: The Circus by Charlie Chaplin, New Babylon by Grigori Kozintsev & Leonid Trauberg, El Dorado by Marcel L'Herbier, The Wind by Victor Sjöström, Asphalt by Joe May, Le voyage dans la lune by Georges Méliès in Colorized version, The White Shadow by Alfred Hitchcock, South by Frank Hurley, Mantrap with Clara Bow, Fiaker Nr.13 by Michael Curtiz, The Italian Cinema: rarities and findings, Japanese Animated Films, Laugh-O-Grams Series by Walt Disney, Odna by Kozintsev e Trauberg.
- 2012: La Passion de Jeanne d'Arc by Carl Theodor Dreyer, A Woman of Affairs by Clarence Brown, The Patsy by King Vidor, Die freudlose Gasse by Georg Wilhelm Pabst, The Goose Woman by Clarence Brown, Les Aventures de Robinson Crusoé by Georges Méliès (Integral and colorized version), The Phono-Cinéma-Théâtre, Oliver Twist with Jackie Coogan, The Girl with a Hatbox by Boris Barnet and with Anna Sten, The Spanish Dancer with Pola Negri, German Animated Films, La Selig Polyscope Company of William Nicholas Selig, Charles Dickens, the father of the script; silent films of Anna Sten, The Stories of W.W. Jacobs.
- 2013: Too Much Johnson, the first film directed by Orson Welles, and the first appearance of Joseph Cotten on screen. The film, long thought lost, was discovered in a warehouse in Pordenone itself.
- 2014: The Eternal City, rediscovered fragment of 1923 movie directed by George Fitzmaurice.
