= Arseny Avraamov =

Avant-garde composer and theorist

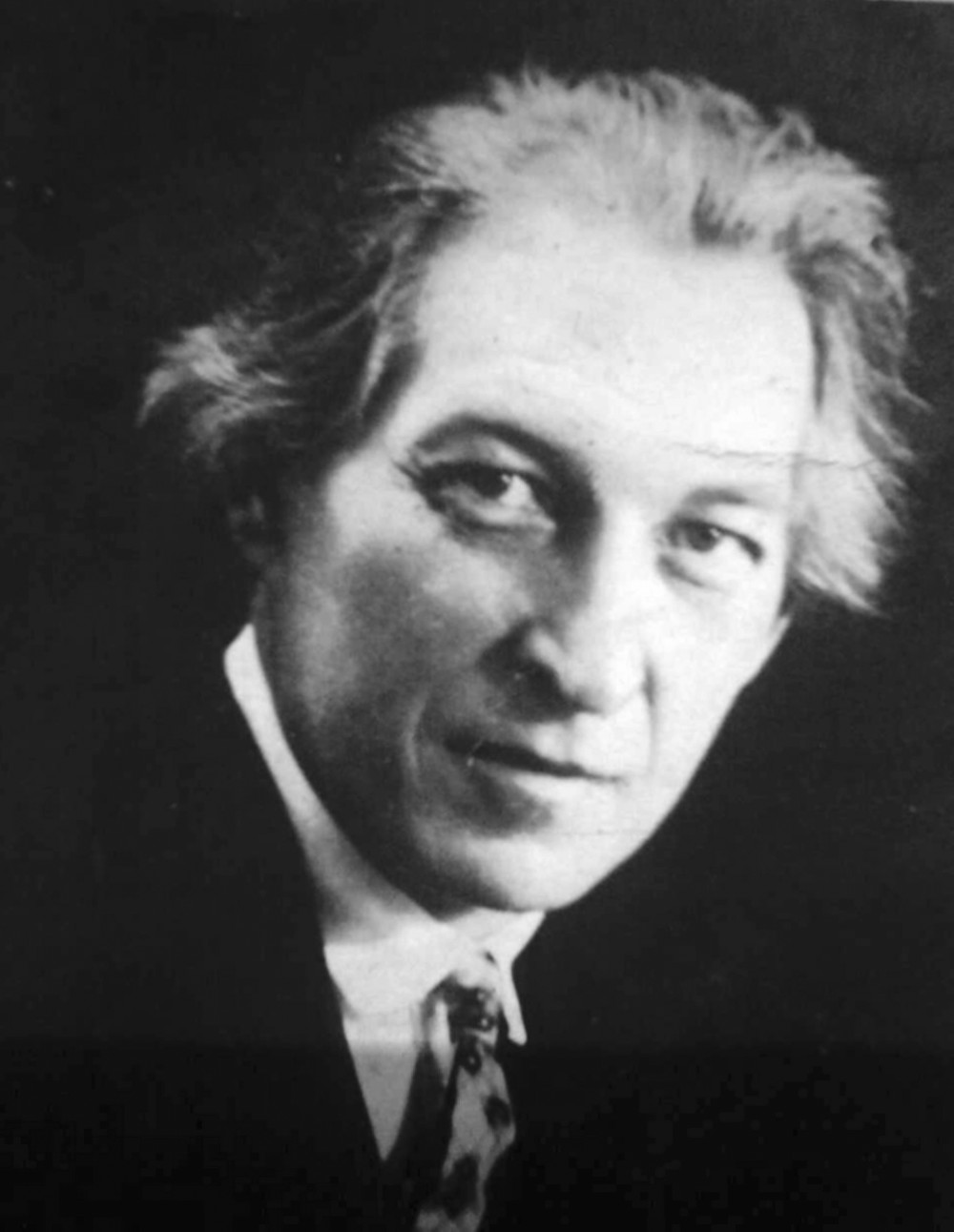
- Arseny Avraamov (ca. 1920)

Background information
- Born: 22 June 1886; Modern day Novoshakhtinsk
- Died: 19 May 1944 (aged 57) Moscow
- Genres: Avant-garde, Experimental music

Arseny Mikhailovich Avraamov (Russian: Арсений Михайлович Авраамов) (1886, Novocherkassk, Russian Empire - 1944, Moscow, USSR) was an avant-garde Russian composer and music theorist.

He studied at the music school of the Moscow Philharmonic Society, with private composition lessons from Sergey Taneyev. An avowed Communist, he refused to fight in World War I, and fled the country to work, among other things, as a circus artist. Returning in 1917, he was appointed Culture Minister for the People's Commissariat for Education.

On 7 November 1922 - the five-year anniversary of the October Revolution - he conducted the inaugural performance of Symphony of Sirens (Гудковая симфония, Gudkovaya simfoniya), for which he is best remembered. Performed in Baku, with Avraamov conducting from a rooftop by waving two red flags, the piece involved navy ship sirens and whistles, bus and car horns, factory sirens, cannons, the foghorns of the entire Soviet flotilla in the Caspian Sea, artillery guns, machine guns, hydroplanes and renderings of Internationale, Warszawianka and Marseillaise by a mass band and choir. The performance also featured the magistral – an instrument invented by Avraamov which consisted of 50 steam whistles attached to pipes, which could be operated independently like the keys of a piano. Symphony of Sirens was attempted just once more, a year later in Moscow, though at a much-reduced scale.

His other notable achievements were the invention of graphic-sonic art, produced by drawing directly onto the optical sound track of film, and an "Ultrachromatic" 48-tone microtonal system, presented in his thesis, "The Universal System of Tones," in Berlin, Frankfurt, and Stuttgart in 1927. His microtonal system predated the creation of the Petrograd Society for quarter-tone music in 1923, by Georgii Rimskii-Korsakov, also contemporary to Julián Carrillo's Sonido 13. Avraamov was also the sound designer for the first Soviet sound film, Abram Room's The Plan for Great Works (1930). Avraamov was friends with Leon Theremin and the pair were part of a team representing the USSR at the 1927 International Exhibition of Music in the Life of Nations held in Frankfurt am Main, Germany.

In 1923-1926 he lived and worked in Dagestan. From 1926 he lived in Moscow. In 1929-1934 he participated in the creation of the first Soviet sound films and headed the sound laboratory at the Research Institute of Cinematography. In 1930-31 he taught the course "History and Theory of Tone Systems" at the Moscow Conservatory. In 1935, he was sent to Nalchik, where he collected and processed the music of the peoples of the North Caucasus, and wrote several compositions based on it. In 1941-1943 he directed the Russian folk choir (founded by P. G. Yarkov).

Due to his work with graphical sound, he is considered one of the progenitors of electronic music.

== Sources ==
- Edmunds, Neil, ed. Soviet Music and Society Under Lenin and Stalin. London: Routledge Curzon, 2004.
- Lobanova, Marina. “Avraamov, Arseny Mikhaylovich.” Grove Music Online ed. L Macy (Accessed 10 June 2008), http://www.grovemusic.com.
- Sitsky, Larry. Music of the Repressed Russian Avant-Garde, 1900-1929. London: Greenwood Press, 1994.
