= In the Mountains of Yugoslavia =

- Russian: В горах Югославии
- Directed by: Abram Room
- Written by: Giorgi Mdivani
- Starring: Ivan Bersenev; Nikolay Mordvinov; Olga Zhizneva; Vsevolod Sanayev
- Cinematography: Eduard Tisse
- Music by: Yuriy Biryukov
- Release date: 1946
- Country: Soviet Union
- Language: Russian

In the Mountains of Yugoslavia (Russian: В горах Югославии) is a 1946 Soviet war drama film directed by Abram Room.

== Plot ==
The film tells about the confrontation of the Yugoslav People's Liberation Army together with the Red Army on the one hand and the German fascists on the other.

== Cast ==
- Ivan Bersenev as Josip Broz Tito
- Nikolay Mordvinov as Slavko Babić
- Olga Zhizneva as Andža
- Vsevolod Sanayev as Aleksey Gubanov
- T. Likar as Milica
- Ljubisa Jovanovic as Janko
- Misa Mirkovic as Simela (as M. Mirkovic)
- Braslav Borozan as Dragojlo (as B. Borozan)
- Vjekoslav Afric as Ivo / General Draža Mihailović
- Vladimir Skrbinsek as Hamdija
- Dragutin Todic as Blaza
- Stane Cesnik as Dusan
- Bojan Stupica as Field Marshal Erwin Rommel
- I. Cesar as General Schmulc
- Olivera Marković
