= Three Comrades =

Three Comrades may refer to:

- Three Comrades (novel), written in 1938 by Erich Maria Remarque
- Three Comrades (1938 film), a 1938 adaptation of the novel, made the same year
- Three Comrades (1935 film), a 1935 Soviet film
