= Potholes (film) =

1928 film

- Directed by: Abram Room
- Written by: Abram Room; Viktor Shklovsky
- Starring: Sergei Minin; Evlaliya Olgina
- Cinematography: Dmitriy Feldman
- Production company: Sovkino
- Release date: 10 January 1928
- Country: Soviet Union
- Languages: Silent; Russian intertitles

Potholes (Russian: Ухабы, romanized: Ukhaby) is a 1928 Soviet silent romantic drama directed by Abram Room.

The film's art direction was done by Viktor Aden.

== Synopsis ==
The setting of the film is a glass factory. Glassblower Paul and the grinder Tanya fall in love and become husband and wife. At the factory, downsizing is happening and Tanya gets dismissed. She does not look for another job, deciding to devote himself to the family and the child. Meanwhile, Paul begins to have romantic relations with his co-worker Lisa and even leaves his family for her. Tanya finds a job at a factory in another city. On the boat, she meets Paul. Deciding to leave his past behind and start a new life he also transferred to another plant. The meeting ends with the reconciliation of the spouses.

== Cast ==
- Sergei Minin
- Evlaliya Olgina

== Bibliography ==
- Christie, Ian & Taylor, Richard. The Film Factory: Russian and Soviet Cinema in Documents 1896-1939. Routledge, 2012.
