= Road to Life =

Road to Life may refer to:

- Road to Life (1955 film), a 1955 Soviet drama film
- Road to Life (1931 film), a 1931 drama film
