= The Garnet Bracelet (film) =

- Russian: Гранатовый браслет
- Directed by: Abram Room
- Written by: Anatoli Granberg; Aleksandr Kuprin; Abram Room
- Starring: Ariadna Shengelaia; Igor Ozerov; Oleg Basilashvili; Vladislav Strzhelchik; Natalya Malyavina
- Cinematography: Leonid Kraynenkov
- Edited by: M. Renkova
- Release date: 1964
- Country: Soviet Union
- Language: Russian

The Garnet Bracelet (Russian: Гранатовый браслет) is a 1964 Soviet romantic drama film directed by Abram Room.

A Russian official falls in love with a young lady, but she does not reciprocate.

== Plot ==
On her name day, Princess Vera Nikolaevna Sheina receives an unexpected gift: a bracelet adorned with a rare green garnet from an anonymous admirer. As a married woman, she feels it improper to accept gifts from other men. Her brother, Nikolai Nikolaevich, a deputy prosecutor, along with her husband, Prince Vasily Lvovich, traces the sender to Georgy Zheltkov, a modest clerk. Years earlier, Zheltkov had seen Vera at a circus performance and fell deeply in love with her, a love that remained pure and unrequited. Over the years, he had sent her letters on special occasions, expressing his adoration from afar.

After being confronted by Vera’s husband and brother, Zheltkov feels ashamed of his actions, which might have compromised the honor of an innocent woman. Yet his love for Vera is so profound and selfless that he cannot imagine life without the faint connection his letters and gestures have allowed. Following their visit, Zheltkov writes a farewell letter to Vera, returns the bracelet to his landlady with instructions to donate it to a church, and takes his own life, unable to find meaning in a world without her.

== Cast ==
- Ariadna Shengelaia as Vera Nikolayevna (as Ariadna Shengelaya)
- Igor Ozerov as Zheltkov
- Oleg Basilashvili as Vasily Lvovitch
- Vladislav Strzhelchik as Nikolai Nikolayevich
- Natalya Malyavina as Anna Nikolayevna (as N. Malyavina)
- Yuri Averin as Von Friesse (as Yu. Averin)
- Olga Zhizneva as Mme. Zarzhitskaya
- Leonid Gallis as Anosov
