= Batalov =

Batalov (Russian: Баталов) is a Russian masculine surname, its feminine counterpart is Batalova. It may refer to:

- Aleksey Batalov (1928–2017), Russian actor
- Andrei Batalov, Russian ballet dancer
- Nikolai Batalov (1899–1937), Russian actor
- Maria Batalova (born 1996), Russian ice hockey player
- Rima Batalova (born 1964), Russian Paralympic athlete
