= Jews on Land =

1927 Soviet film

- Full movie
- Russian: Евреи на земле
- Directed by: Abram Room
- Written by: Vladimir Mayakovsky; Viktor Shklovsky
- Cinematography: Albert Kyun
- Release date: 1927
- Running time: 17 minute
- Country: Soviet Union
- Language: Russian

Jews on Land (Russian: Евреи на земле) is a 1927 Soviet short documentary film directed by Abram Room.

== Plot ==
The Soviet propaganda documentary "The Jew and the Earth" was filmed by OZET as part of a campaign against anti-Semitism in the USSR in the late 1920s. The film shows how the Jewish workers colonize the Black Sea area and Crimean lands. The communes are created for successful development of the abandoned lands, in which people are living only internal colonial life. Jewish colonists are represented as one large family against the backdrop of manifestations of anti-Semitism that intensified in the USSR in the late 1920s. The filmmakers linked this unprecedented experience in Jewish history to the country's modern history.

== Crew ==
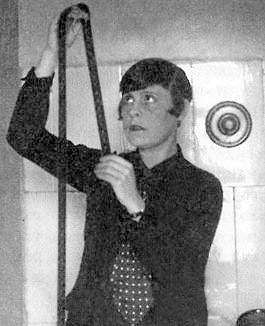
Lilya Brik during film production

- Director - Abram Room
- Writers - Vladimir Mayakovsky, Abram Room, and Viktor Shklovsky
- Cameraman - Albert Queen
- Assistant director - Lilya Brik

== Production ==
The film was produced as part of a campaign responding to the first wave of antisemitism that swept through the Soviet press in the late 1920s.

Filming took place in Krasnodar Krai, with some scenes shot near Yevpatoria in Crimea. Yan Levchenko wrote of the film:

Jews on Land is a unique film—primarily due to its subject matter—serving as a chronicle of an ethnographic revolution; an experiment attempted in the USSR twenty years before the establishment of a Jewish state that would later pin its hopes on the kibbutz system.
