= Fifteen-Year-Old Captain =

- Russian: Пятнадцатилетний капитан
- Directed by: Vasily Zhuravlyov
- Written by: Jules Verne; Georgiy Grebner; Vasily Zhuravlyov
- Starring: Vsevolod Larionov; Yelena Izmailova; Mikhail Astangov; Weyland Rodd; Azharik Messerer
- Cinematography: Yuli Fogelman
- Music by: Nikita Bogoslovskiy
- Release date: 1945
- Country: Soviet Union

Fifteen-Year-Old Captain (Russian: Пятнадцатилетний капитан) is a 1945 Soviet adventure film directed by Vasily Zhuravlyov.

The film tells about the fifteen-year-old sailor Dick Sand, who as a result of the betrayal of the ship's cocago Negoro is on the banks of Angola, where his adventures begin.

This is an adaptation of Jules Verne's novel Dick Sand, A Captain at Fifteen.

== Plot ==
The whaling brig "Pilgrim," commanded by the experienced Captain Gulya, arrives in Auckland, where it takes aboard passengers, including the family of shipowner James Weldon. In open waters, the travelers come across drifting wreckage from a ship and discover several surviving African Americans. Soon, the captain and other whalers set off in a small boat to hunt whales but disappear into the ocean. Fifteen-year-old cabin boy Dick Sand, along with the rescued African Americans, is left to take on the roles of both captain and crew in order to deliver the passengers to South America.

However, due to the betrayal of the treacherous ship's cook, Negoro, a former slave trader, the brig is diverted from its course to America and instead reaches the shores of Angola, where it is stranded. Venturing into the jungle, Dick and his companions are captured by local slave traders, but the strongest of the Africans, Hercules, manages to escape. Negoro, now allied with the slave traders, demands a ransom for Weldon's wife and son.

With the help of Hercules, who disguises himself as a "mgangga" sorcerer, the courageous Dick must rescue the crew and passengers and take revenge on the villains for their crimes.

== Cast ==
- Vsevolod Larionov as Master Dick Sand
- Yelena Izmailova as Mrs. Weldon
- Mikhail Astangov as Sebastian Pereira, alias Negoro
- Weyland Rodd as Hercules, sailor (as Veiland Rodd)
- Azharik Messerer as Jackie Weldon
- Coretti Arle Titz as Nan
- Aleksandr Khvylya as Whaler Captain Hull (as A. Khvyla)
- Viktor Kulakov as Arthur Garris
- Osip Abdulov as Jose Antonio Alvarez
- Sergei Tsenin as L.T. Worby, shipping agent
- Ivan Bobrov as King Muani-Lung (as I. Bobrov)
- Aram Kuk as Thomas
- Pavel Sukhanov as Cousin Benedict
