= Valentina Kuindzhi =

Soviet actress

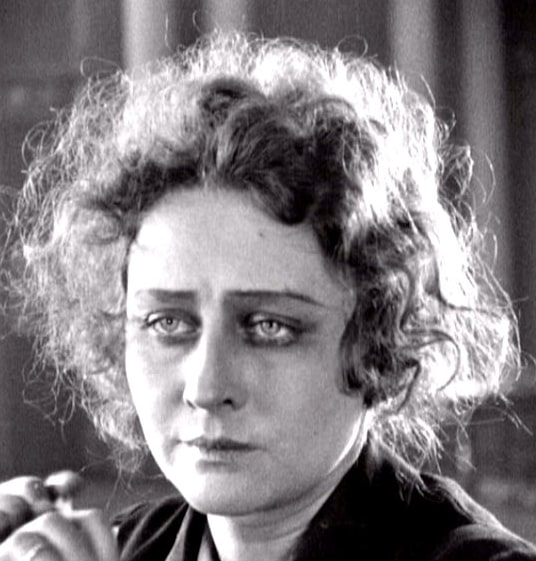
- Valentina Kuindzhi in 1924
- Born: Valentina Kuindzhi; 24 August 1893; Saint Petersburg, Russian Empire
- Died: 6 June 1969 (aged 75); Leningrad, Russian Soviet Federative Socialist Republic, Soviet Union
- Resting place: Northern Cemetery, Pargolovo, Russia
- Occupation: Actress
- Years active: 1924–1958
- Spouse: Mikhail Libakov

Valentina Efimovna Kuindzhi (Russian: Валентина Ефимовна Куинджи; born 24 August 1884 – 6 June 1969) was a Russian and Soviet stage and film actress.

== Selected filmography ==
- 1924 — Aelita
- 1947 — Miklukho-Maklai
- 1958 — October Days
