= Nikolai Batalov =

Soviet and Russian actor

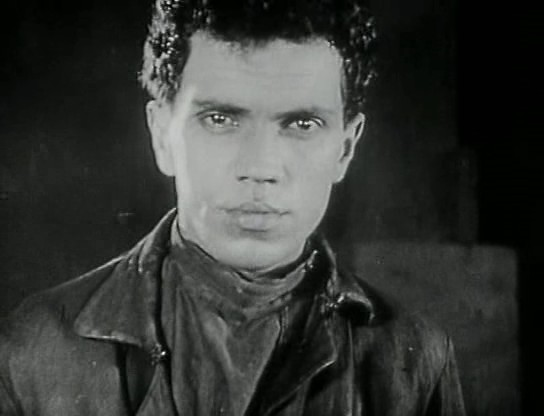
Batalov in 1926

Nikolai Petrovich Batalov (Russian: Николай Петрович Баталов; 6 December 1899 – 10 November 1937) was a Soviet and Russian stage and film actor. He performed in a number of notable films between 1924 and 1931.

He was awarded the title Merited Artist of the Russian Federation in 1933.

He married People's Artist of the USSR Olga Androvskaya in 1921. He was actor Aleksei Batalov's uncle.

== Life and career ==
Born in Moscow, Batalov joined the Second Studio of the Moscow Art Theater in 1916 and became a member of the theater’s main troupe in 1924.

Batalov's film debut was the supporting role of Red Army private Gusev in Yakov Protazanov's science fiction film Aelita (1924). Batalov gained international recognition as the heroic worker Pavel Vlasov in Vsevolod Pudovkin's Mother (1926). In Abram Room's controversial social drama Bed and Sofa (1927) he played a more humorous character. The film was a fictionalized account of the relationship of the Russian poet Vladimir Mayakovsky who lived with Lilya Brik and her husband Osip Brik for some years.

Batalov became one of the most in demand Soviet silent film actors. He transitioned to sound film successfully with the first Soviet sound feature, Nikolai Ekk's Road to Life (1931), in which he portrayed Communist educator Nikolai Sergeev, who wins the trust of homeless juvenile delinquents and converts them to Soviet ideals. Lev Kuleshov cast Batalov in the title role of Jewish watchmaker Leo Horizon in Horizon (1932), the second Soviet sound film, released in early 1933. Batalov also starred in a number of historical and adventure films such as The Shepherd and the Tsar (1935). Semen Timoshenko's comedy Three Comrades (1935), in which Batalov played efficient manager Latsis, was also a success. He died in 1937 in Moscow after a lengthy illness of severe tuberculosis.

== Selected filmography ==
Film
Year	Title	Role	Notes
1935	Three Comrades	Latsis	
1932	Horizon	Lev Horizon	
1931	Road to Life	Nikolai Ivanovich Sergeyev	
1927	The Yellow Ticket	Maria's fellow villager	
1927	Bed and Sofa	Nikolai	
1926	Mother	Pavel Vlasov	
1924	Aelita	Gusev	
