= Across the Cemetery =

1964 Soviet WWII film

- Russian: Через кладбище
- Directed by: Viktor Turov
- Written by: Pavel Nilin
- Starring: Vladimir Belokurov; Yelizaveta Uvarova; Galina Morachyova; Antonina Bendova; Vladimir Yemelyanov; Vladimir Martynov
- Cinematography: Anatoliy Zabolotskiy
- Music by: Andrei Volkonsky
- Release date: 1964
- Country: Soviet Union
- Language: Russian

Across the Cemetery (Russian: Через кладбище) is a 1964 Soviet World War II film directed by Viktor Turov.

== Plot ==
The film takes place in the autumn of 1942. The Nazis approached Stalingrad. They are opposed by Belarusian partisans who were left without shells, as a result of which they decided to send a young guy named Mikhas along with Sazon Ivanovich to a mechanic. They successfully reached the point where the shells were hidden and suddenly they saw the Germans...

== Cast ==
- Vladimir Belokurov as Sazon Ivanovich Kulik
- Yelizaveta Uvarova as Sofya Kazimirovna Bugreyeva
- Galina Morachyova as Yeva
- Antonina Bendova as Klava
- Vladimir Yemelyanov as Vasiliy Yegorovich Bugreyev
- Vladimir Martynov as Mikhas Pashkevich
- Igor Yasulovich as Feliks Bugreyev
- Pyotr Savin as Kozakov
- Valentin Bryleev as Policeman
- Vitold Janpavlis as German Officer (uncredited)
