= Pavel Pol =

Russian and Soviet actor (1887–1955)

- Born: Pavel Nikolaevich Sinitsyn; 10 May 1887
- Died: 26 April 1955 (aged 67)
- Occupation: Actor
- Years active: 1924–1954

Pavel Nikolaevich Pol (Russian: Павел Николаевич Поль) (born: Sinitsyn, 10 May 1887 – 26 April 1955) was a Russian and Soviet actor. People's Artist of the RSFSR (1947).

== Biography ==
Pavel was born on May 10, 1887. In 1904, he began performing at the People’s Houses in Sokolniki, at the Aquarium. After that, he worked in theaters of Siberia, Arkhangelsk, Novorossiysk, performing various comedic roles, in 1919 he began to play in the Tbilisi Drama Theater, in 1922 he worked in the theater Curved Jimmy. He was one of the organizers of the Moscow Theater of Satire and starred in films.

== Selected filmography ==
- 1924 — Aelita
- 1927 — The Girl with a Hatbox
- 1954 — The Boys from Leningrad
