= Bus Stop (1956 film) =

Film by Joshua Logan

- Theatrical release poster by Tom Chantrell
- Directed by: Joshua Logan
- Screenplay by: George Axelrod
- Based on: Bus Stop (1955 play) by William Inge
- Produced by: Buddy Adler
- Starring: Marilyn Monroe; Don Murray; Arthur O'Connell; Betty Field; Eileen Heckart
- Cinematography: Milton Krasner
- Edited by: William H. Reynolds
- Music by: Alfred Newman; Cyril J. Mockridge
- Production company: 20th Century Fox
- Distributed by: 20th Century Fox
- Release date: August 31, 1956 (U.S.)
- Running time: 96 minutes
- Country: United States
- Language: English
- Budget: $2.2 million
- Box office: $7.27 million

Bus Stop is a 1956 American romantic comedy-drama directed by Joshua Logan, adapted by George Axelrod from the 1955 play by William Inge. It stars Marilyn Monroe, Don Murray, Arthur O'Connell, Betty Field, Eileen Heckart, Robert Bray, and Hope Lange. The film is about the events surrounding a rodeo and a group of long-haul bus passengers stranded at a diner during a snowstorm, including the ensuing relationship between a naive cowboy (Murray) and an aspiring singer (Monroe). It is the film debut of both Murray and Lange.

Unlike most of Monroe's films, Bus Stop is neither a full-fledged comedy nor a musical, but rather a dramatic piece, and it was the first film she appeared in after studying at the Actors Studio in New York. Monroe sings one song in the film: "That Old Black Magic" by Harold Arlen and Johnny Mercer.

The film was released by 20th Century Fox on August 31, 1956, and was both a critical and commercial success. Don Murray was nominated for an Academy Award for Best Supporting Actor and a BAFTA Award for Most Promising Newcomer for his performance. At the 14th Golden Globe Awards, the film was nominated for Best Motion Picture – Musical or Comedy and Monroe for Best Actress. The film was also nominated for Golden Lion at the 17th Venice International Film Festival.

== Plot ==
A naive, unintelligent, socially inept, loud-mouth cowboy, Beauregard "Bo" Decker, and his friend and father-figure Virgil Blessing take the bus from Timber Hill, Montana, to Phoenix, Arizona, to participate in a rodeo. Virgil has encouraged the 21-year-old virgin Bo to take an interest in women. Initially reluctant and frightened of the idea, Beau declares that he hopes to find an "angel" and will know her when he sees her. Making trouble everywhere they go, he continues his unsophisticated behavior in Grace's Diner. In Phoenix, at the Blue Dragon Café, he imagines himself in love with the café's chanteuse, Chérie, an ambitious performer from River Gulch, Arkansas (in the Ozarks) with aspirations of becoming a Hollywood star. Her rendition of "That Old Black Magic" entrances him and he forces her outside, despite the establishment's rules against it, kisses her and thinks that means they are engaged. Chérie is physically attracted to him but resists his plans to take her back to Montana. She has no intention of marrying him and tells him so, but he is too stubborn to listen.

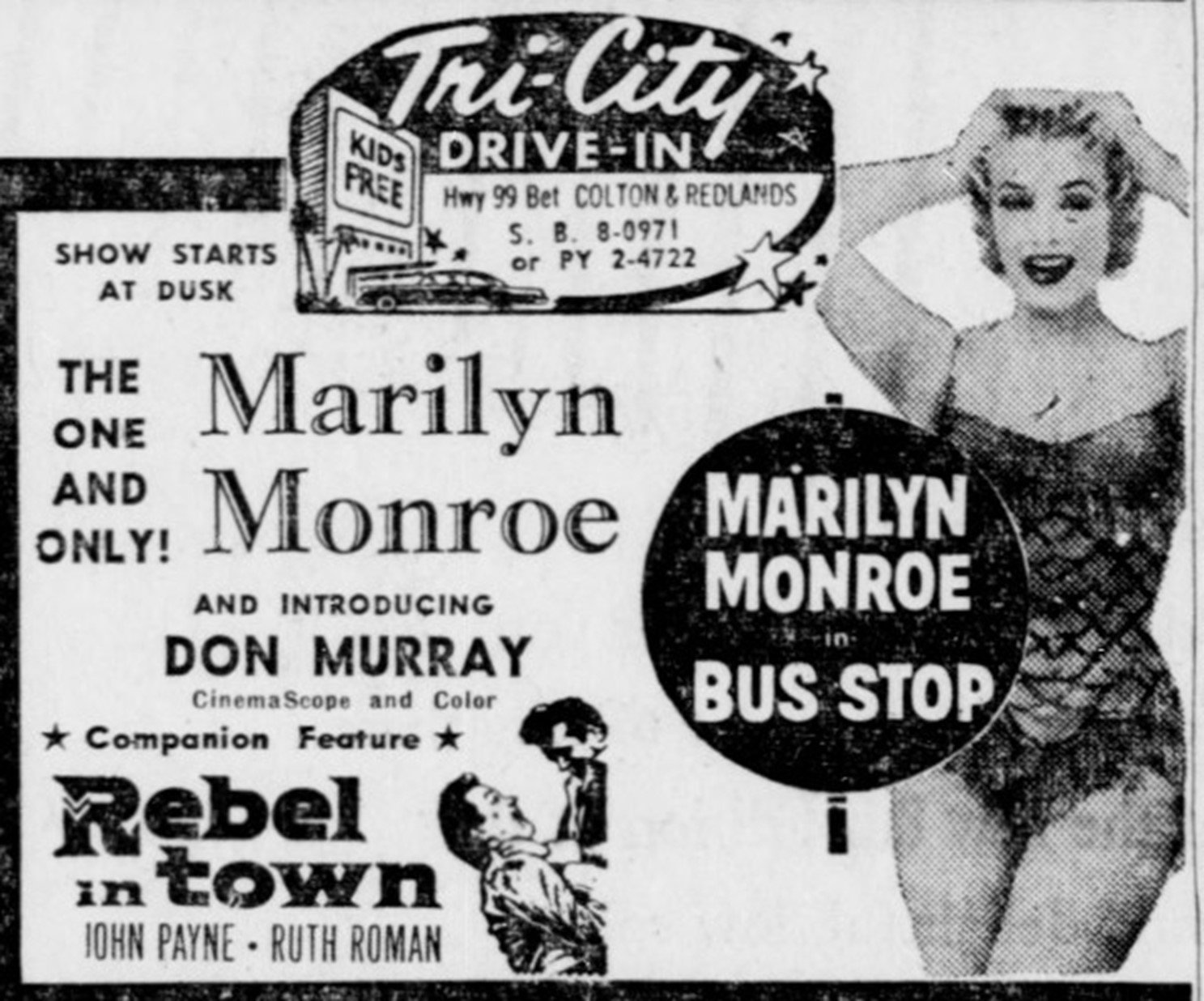
Drive-in advertisement from 1956

The next day, Bo obtains a marriage license, and then takes an exhausted Chérie to the rodeo parade and the rodeo, where he rides the bucking bronco and then competes in the calf-roping and the bull-riding. Bo intends to marry Chérie at the rodeo, but she runs away. He tracks her down at the Blue Dragon Café, where she jumps out a rear window and flees. Bo catches her and forces her onto the bus back to Montana. On the way, they stop at Grace's Diner, the same place the bus stopped on the way to Phoenix. Chérie tries to make another getaway while Bo is asleep on the bus, but the road ahead is blocked by a blizzard, leaving the passengers stranded in the diner. The bus driver, Carl, the waitress, Elma, and the café owner, Grace, by now all have learned that Bo is kidnapping and bullying Chérie. Virgil and Carl fight him until he promises to apologize to Chérie and leave her alone. He, however, is unable to do so because he is humiliated about having been beaten.

The next morning, the storm has cleared and everybody is free to go. Bo finally apologizes to Chérie for his abusive behavior and begs her forgiveness. He wishes her well and prepares to depart without her. Chérie approaches him and confesses that she has had many boyfriends and is not the kind of woman he thinks she is. Bo confesses his lack of experience to her. Bo asks to kiss her goodbye and they share their first real kiss. All Chérie wanted from a man was respect, which she had previously told Elma when they sat together on the bus. This new Bo attracts Chérie. He accepts her past, explaining that everything she's previously done made her into the person that he likes now, and this gesture touches her heart. She tells him that she will go anywhere with him. Virgil decides to stay behind. When Bo tries to coerce him to go with them, Chérie reminds him that he cannot force Virgil to do what he wants. Having finally apparently learned his lesson, Bo offers Chérie his jacket and gallantly helps her onto the bus.

== Cast ==
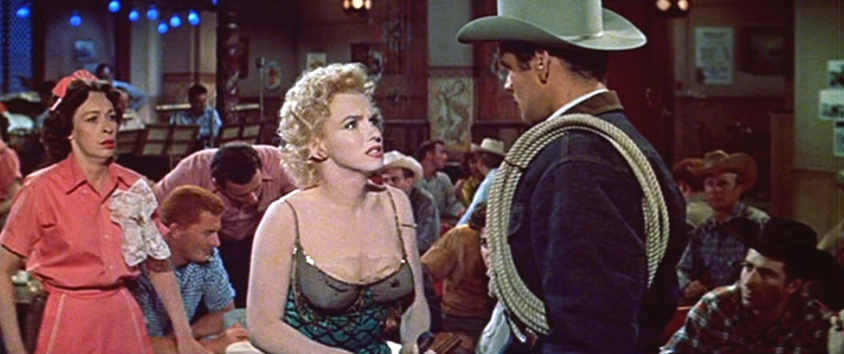
From left to right: Eileen Heckart, Marilyn Monroe and Don Murray

- Marilyn Monroe as Chérie
- Don Murray as Beauregard "Bo" Decker
- Arthur O'Connell as Virgil Blessing
- Betty Field as Grace Hoylard
- Eileen Heckart as Vera
- Robert Bray as Carl
- Hope Lange as Elma Duckworth
- Terry Kelman as Gerald
- Linda Brace as Evelyn
- Hans Conried as a Life magazine photographer
- Casey Adams as a Life magazine reporter

Credits from the AFI Catalog of Feature Films.

== Production ==
Bus Stop is based on William Inge's play of the same name (which in turn was expanded from an earlier, one-act play titled People in the Wind). The inspiration for the play came from people Inge met in Tonganoxie, Kansas. The original production opened at the Music Box Theatre on Broadway in March 1955, with Kim Stanley as Chérie and Albert Salmi as Bo.

Bus Stop was the first film that Marilyn Monroe chose to make under a new contract. For the role, she learned an Ozark accent, chose costumes and make-up that lacked the glamour of her earlier films, and provided deliberately mediocre singing and dancing. Joshua Logan, known for his work on Broadway, agreed to direct, despite initially doubting Monroe's acting abilities and knowing of her reputation for being difficult. Filming took place in Sun Valley, Idaho, and Phoenix, Arizona, in early 1956, with Monroe "technically in charge" as the head of MMP (Marilyn Monroe Productions, her film production company), occasionally making decisions on cinematography and with Logan adapting to her chronic tardiness and perfectionism. Clint Eastwood and Montgomery Clift considered for the role of Bo Decker, but the role eventually went to newcomer Don Murray, who was personally selected by Logan after the director saw him in a stage revival of The Skin of Our Teeth. The film was also the debut of Hope Lange, who married Murray shortly after production wrapped.

The experience changed Logan's opinion of Monroe, and he later compared her to Charlie Chaplin in her ability to blend comedy and tragedy. According to Don Murray, the director was not perturbed that Monroe was accompanied on the set by her own acting coach, Paula Strasberg of the Actors Studio. Murray later recalled: "Paula was there every day, even on location...Logan worked with it very well. He let her talk to Marilyn. Then he would step in and direct. He was very patient. Very few directors would have put up with it."

George Axelrod, who wrote the script, later said:

I liked that very much. And I think even William Inge now concedes it is at least as good as the play. Because, given the necessities of the stage, he had to cram it all into that one set, whereas it was a play very susceptible to being opened up. It took Marilyn two years to realise that this was her best performance. Indeed, she did not speak to either Josh Logan or me for a year afterwards, because she felt we'd cut the picture in favour of the boy. Later she came to realise she was wrong. It suggests to me that actors have a very dim appreciation of what's good or what's bad about their performances.

== Reception ==
Bus Stop became a box office success, earning more than $7 million in distributor rentals, and received mainly favorable reviews, with Monroe's performance being highly praised. The Saturday Review of Literature wrote that Monroe's performance "effectively dispels once and for all the notion that she is merely a glamour personality". Bosley Crowther of The New York Times praised the lead performances, as well as O'Connell, Heckart, Field and Bray. He wrote of Monroe, "Hold on to your chairs, everybody, and get set for a rattling surprise. Marilyn Monroe has finally proved herself an actress."

On the review aggregator website Rotten Tomatoes, the film holds an approval rating of 73% based on 15 reviews, with an average rating of 7/10.

=== Awards and nominations ===
Award	Category	Nominee(s)	Result	Ref.
Academy Awards	Best Supporting Actor	Don Murray	Nominated	
British Academy Film Awards	Most Promising Newcomer to Film	Don Murray	Nominated	
Directors Guild of America Awards	Outstanding Directorial Achievement in Motion Pictures	Joshua Logan	Nominated	
Golden Globe Awards	Best Motion Picture – Musical or Comedy		Nominated	
Golden Globe Awards	Best Actress in a Motion Picture – Musical or Comedy	Marilyn Monroe	Nominated	
Laurel Awards	Top Female Comedy Performance	Marilyn Monroe	Nominated	
Laurel Awards	Top Female Supporting Performance	Betty Field	4th Place	
National Board of Review Awards	Top Ten Films		10th Place	
Venice Film Festival	Golden Lion	Joshua Logan	Nominated	
Writers Guild of America Awards	Best Written American Comedy	George Axelrod	Nominated	

== See also ==
- List of American films of 1956
