= Alexander Shenshin =

Russian composer

Alexander Alexeyevich Shenshin (Russian: Александр Алексеевич Шеншин; 1890–1944) was a Russian composer.

Shenshin studied music with Boleslav Yavorsky, Alexander Gretchaninov, Reinhold Glière, and Semyon Kruglikov from 1907 to 1915. He received a teacher's appointment to the Moscow Conservatory in 1922, and by 1940 he was a member of the Academy of Arts and the composer of the Moscow Children's Theater.

Shenshin was a member of the first Presidium of the Moscow Institute of Artistic Culture and a close friend of its president, Wassily Kandinsky, a noted painter who shared an interest in using scientific methods to further a synthesis of the arts. Kandinsky praised Shenshin's theoretical work, in particular an analysis of two parts of Liszt's composition Années de Pèlerinage: the "Sposalizio", inspired by Raphael's painting The Marriage of the Virgin, and the "Penseroso", inspired by Michelangelo's statue atop the tomb of Lorenzo II de' Medici, Duke of Urbino. Shenshin counted the notes and bars in the music and translated them into graphic form, and he measured the corresponding painting and sculpture, linking them to the same mathematical formula.

== Works ==
Piano

- 14 Preludes (1910)
- 17 Preludes (1910)
- Op.3. 7 Preludes
- Op.10. 9 Preludes
- Op.13. Sonata No.1 (1913)
- Sonata No.2 (1926)

Voice and piano

- Song Cycle after Blok
- Song Cycle after Sologub
- Song Cycle after Lenau (trans. Shervinsky)
- Op.11. Song Cycle after Baudelaire (trans. Shervinsky)
- Op.12. 5 Songs (Shervinsky)
- Op.14–15 Song Cycles after German poets

Chamber ensemble

- Piano Quintet (1911)
- String Quartet (1943)

Orchestral

- Symphonic poem Ийола (1918)
- Summer pictures. Lyric Suite for Symphony Orchestra (for K. D. Balmont, 1929)

Opera

- O-Tao (1925)

Operetta

- Twelfth Night (1939, Moscow Operetta Theater)

Ballet

- Ancient Dances (Dionysus, 1933, Bolshoi Theatre)
- Tale of Carmen (1935)

Film

- The Ghost That Never Returns (1929)
- Tommy (1931)
