= Sailor Chizhik =

1955 drama film

- Russian: Матрос Чижик
- Directed by: Vladimir Braun
- Written by: Vladimir Braun; Konstantin Stanyukovich
- Starring: Mikhail Kuznetsov; Vladimir Yemelyanov; Nadezhda Cherednichenko
- Cinematography: Vladimir Vojtenko
- Music by: Igor Shamo
- Production company: Dovzhenko Film Studios
- Release date: 1955
- Running time: 86 min.
- Country: Soviet Union
- Language: Russian

Sailor Chizhik (Russian: «Матрос Чижик», romanized: Matros Chizhik) is a 1955 Soviet drama film directed by Vladimir Braun.

== Plot ==
Having received an injury during the exercises, the sailor Chizhik is sent by the orderly to the house of Captain Luzgin. Wife of the captain of a young beautiful woman is very cruel to the orderly, constantly humiliating him, counting a servant. The only joy in the life of the sailor is communication with the little sadchuk Shura, a kind, fair and sensitive boy.

Once, unable to withstand the insults of the mistress, the orderly decides to flee. It is stopped only by an unforeseen circumstance: the heaviest inflammation of the lungs in a child. A vigilant nurse, not for a moment leaving Shura, sits Chizhik at his bed, literally fighting with death.

== Cast ==
- Mikhail Kuznetsov as Feodosy Chizhik
- Vladimir Yemelyanov as Vasily Luzgin, a captain
- Nadezhda Cherednichenko as Mariya Ivanovna, Luzgin's wife
- Anatoly Melnikov as Shurka, Luzgin's son
- Nadezhda Sementsova as Anyutka
- Vsevolod Tyagushev as Ivan
- Sergey Petrov as Doktor
- Ivan Ryzhov as sailor
- Lev Silayev as Michman
- Valentina Telegina as Avdotya Petrovna
- Mikhail Troyanovsky as Flegont Nilych

== Release ==
With the Soviet Union, Vladimir Braun's film was watched by 22.3 million spectators (786th result).
