= Bus Stop (play) =

1955 play by William Inge

- Written by: William Inge
- Genre: Drama
- Setting: Kansas

Premiere
- Date: March 2, 1955

Bus Stop is a 1955 play by American playwright William Inge. Produced on Broadway, it was nominated for four Tony Awards in 1956. It received major revivals in the United States and United Kingdom in 2010 and 2011.

Bus Stop was adapted as a 1956 film of the same name, directed by Joshua Logan and starring Marilyn Monroe and Don Murray; none of the original Broadway cast repeated their roles for the film. The play was also adapted as a 26-episode TV series which aired on ABC from 1961–1962. A special theater production broadcast from the Claremont Theater in California was aired in 1982 on HBO.

== Characters ==
Bus Stop is a drama, with romantic and some comedic elements. It is set in a diner in rural Kansas, about 25 mi (40 km) west of Kansas City, Missouri, during a snowstorm. The bus passengers had to take shelter here.

The characters are:

- Grace Hoylard – Owner of the diner. She is 40ish, and pretty in a fading, hard-bitten way. She has a passionate side to her nature, loving a good fight and the attentions of a good man.
- Elma Duckworth – An intelligent, but naive and impressionable high school girl working as a waitress at the diner.
- Will Masters – The local sheriff. Brusque in manner, but goodhearted and described as a "deacon of his church". A highly "moral" man in the general sense of the word.
- Dr. Gerald Lyman – A college philosophy professor who is articulate and charming but cannot hold a position, partially due to his resistance to any kind of authority, and partially due to his taste for young women. He also has a drinking problem.
- Cherie – A pretty young woman who comes from a difficult "hill folk" background. She is an aspiring nightclub singer, but has never worked above the level of "cheap dive".
- Bo Decker – A brash young cowboy with boorish manners that hide a naivete almost as profound as Elma's. He believes that Cherie will be his bride, although she wants nothing to do with him.
- Virgil Blessing – An older, wiser cowboy who has become a father figure to Bo (who was orphaned at the age of 10) and serves as his head ranch hand.
- Carl – The bus driver, who has an ongoing "just passing through" relationship with Grace. This is purely sexual in nature.

== Synopsis ==
The play is set in a diner about 25 miles west of Kansas City in early March 1955. A freak snowstorm has halted the bus, and the eight characters (five on the bus) have a weather-enforced layover in the diner from approximately 1 am to 5 am. Romantic or quasi-romantic relationships include Grace and Carl, Professor Lyman and Elma, and Cherie and Bo. Virgil and Will are the older authority figures outside the relationships.

== Broadway ==
Bus Stop opened on March 2, 1955 and closed on April 21, 1956, running for a total of 478 performances. The opening night starred Albert Salmi as Bo and Kim Stanley as Cherie, and the play was directed by Harold Clurman.

The play was nominated for four Tony Awards in 1956: Best Play (written by William Inge; produced by Robert Whitehead and Roger L. Stevens); Best Featured Actress in a Play (Elaine Stritch); Best Scenic Design (Boris Aronson); and Best Director (Harold Clurman).

In 1996, there was a short-lived revival of the play that ran for 29 performances.

== Revivals ==
A major regional revival of Bus Stop was held at the Huntington Theatre in Boston in September and October 2010.

In 2010 and 2011 Bus Stop received three productions in Great Britain, including an acclaimed production directed by James Dacre that played at the New Vic and Stephen Joseph Theatres. The Guardian wrote of this production that "there is something beguiling about this forlorn slice of Americana, which mediates on the distances between towns and the distances between people, like an Edward Hopper painting with dialogue."

== Film and musical ==
In 1956, Joshua Logan directed a film adaptation of the play by the same name, starring Marilyn Monroe as Cheri and Don Murray as Bo. In this version, it was "opened up" to include scenes on the bus and in places away from the diner.

The play was adapted as a musical Cherry (1972), with Logan directing.

== Television ==
The play was adapted as a a 26-episode, American TV drama series. It aired on ABC from October 1, 1961 until March 25, 1962.

In August 1982, Bus Stop was presented on HBO, as a special filmed performance of the play at the Claremont Theater in California, directed by Peter Hunt. It starred Tim Matheson as Bo Decker and Margot Kidder as Cherie.

== Awards and nominations ==
=== Original Broadway production ===
| Year | Award | Category | Nominee | Result |
|---|---|---|---|---|
| 1956 | Tony Award | Best Play | | Nominated |
| 1956 | Tony Award | Best Featured Actress in a Play | Elaine Stritch | Nominated |
| 1956 | Tony Award | Best Scenic Design | Boris Aronson | Nominated |
| 1956 | Tony Award | Best Director | Harold Clurman | Nominated |
