= Squadron No. 5 =

- Russian: Эскадрилья № 5
- Directed by: Abram Room
- Written by: Iosif Prut
- Starring: Yuri Shumsky; Nikolai Garin; Boris Bezgin; Sofiya Altovskaya; Andrei Apsolon
- Cinematography: Nikolai Topchiy
- Music by: Konstantin Dankevich
- Release date: 1939
- Country: Soviet Union
- Language: Russian

Squadron No. 5 (Russian: Эскадрилья № 5) is a 1939 Soviet war film directed by Abram Room.

The film tells the story of two Soviet pilots, shot down behind enemy lines, infiltrate a German base with the help of anti-fascist resistance to relay vital intelligence and return home.

== Plot ==
Set during a hypothetical war, the Soviet intelligence intercepts a high command order from hostile Germany to cross the Soviet border. A squadron of Soviet bombers, including Squadron No. 5, is sent to bomb German airfields. Despite successfully completing the mission, two Soviet aircraft are shot down by the enemy. The pilots of Squadron No. 5, Major Grishin and Captain Nesterov, parachute into enemy territory.

After capturing German uniforms, they accidentally encounter a group of German anti-fascists who help them infiltrate an underground enemy base. Posing as German officers, they learn the enemy’s plans and use a German radio station to transmit the coordinates of a hidden base to the Soviet bombers. Later, with the help of a German anti-fascist soldier, the heroes seize a plane and safely return to their airfield.

== Cast ==
- Yuri Shumsky as Front Commander
- Nikolai Garin as Mayor Pyotr Grishin
- Boris Bezgin as Captain Aleksandr Nesterov
- Sofiya Altovskaya as Olga Grishina
- Andrei Apsolon as Syoma Gnatenko
- Viktor Gromov as General Gofer
- Sergei Tsenin as General Khvat
- Nikolai Bratersky as Lieutenant Oberst
- Yakov Zaslavsky as Lieutenant Gorn
- L. Novikov as Lieutenant Vessel
- Viktor Dobrovolsky
