= Vladimir Yemelyanov =

Soviet actor (1911–1975)

- Born: Vladimir Nikolayevich Yemelyanov; 20 June 1911; Perm, Permsky Uyezd, Perm Governorate, Russian Empire
- Died: 2 July 1975 (aged 64); Donetsk, Ukrainian SSR, Soviet Union
- Occupations: Actor, film producer
- Years active: 1953–1975

Vladimir Nikolayevich Yemelyanov (Russian: Влади́мир Никола́евич Емелья́нов; 20 June 1911 – 2 July 1975) was a Soviet actor and producer who appeared in 42 films between 1953 and 1975. He is most known for Road to Life (1955), The Immortal Garrison (1956) and Planeta Bur (1962).

In Motovilikhinsky City District of Perm, there is an actor Yemelyanov's street. He died on 2 July 1975, during the filming of a movie in Donetsk.

== Selected filmography ==
- Hostile Whirlwinds (1953) – Dzerzhinsky
- School of Courage (1954) – Guerilla Leader
- Certificate of Maturity (1954) – Listovskiy, otetts Valentina
- Least We Forget (1954) – Sekretar obkoma
- Road to Life (1955) – Anton Semyonovich Makarenko
- Sailor Chizhik (1956) – Vasiliy Luzgin, kapitan 2-go ranga
- More zovyot (1956) – Fyodor Mikhaylovich
- The Immortal Garrison (1956) – Pyotr Kondratyev
- Eto nachinalos tak... (1956)
- An Unusual Summer (1957) – Pyotr Ragosyn
- Trubachyov's Detachment Is Fighting (1957)
- Sluchay v pustyne (1957) – Colonel
- Sasha Enters Life (1957) – Party Leader (Tugoi uzel version)
- Tsel ego zhizni (1958) – Selivanov
- The Variegateds Case (1958) – Innokentiy Grigorev
- Flagi na bashnyakh (1958) – Anton Semyonovich Makarenko
- Esimese järgu kapten (1958) – Viktor Zheleznov – vitse admiral
- Sonnensucher (1958) – Oberst Fedossjew
- I Was a Satellite of the Sun (1959) – Igor Petrovich Kalinin
- Furqat (1959) – Governor-General
- First Captain (1959)
- Goryachaya dusha (1960)
- Far from the Motherland (1960) – Rabochiy benzokolonki
- A Man Changes Skin (1960) – Komarenko
- Vodil poyezda mashinist (1961)
- Planeta Bur (1962) – Ilya Vershinin
- Kogda razvodyat mosty (1963)
- Silense (1964) – Nikolay Vokhmintsev
- Come Here, Mukhtar! (1964) – Sergey Prokofyevich mayor
- Across the Cemetery (1965) – Vasiliy Yegorovich Bugreyev
- Pomni, Kaspar! (1965)
- Skvoz ledyanuyu mglu (1965) – Police Chief
- Nights of Farewell (1965) – Ivan Vsevolozhsky
- Nepokoryonnyy batalyon (1965) – Dobrovolskiy
- I'm going to search (1966) – Colonel Itsenko
- Chiisai tôbôsha (1966)
- Ikh znali tolko v litso (1967) – vitse-admiral Reinhardt
- Dikiy myod (1967)
- Tsygan (1967) – Timofey Ilyich
- Vernost materi (1967)
- Parol ne nuzhen (1967)
- Zapomnim etot den (1968) – Minsk Council Chairman
- Anyutyna doroga (1968) – Platon Pavlovich
- Razvedchiki (1969) – General-mayor
- Povest' o chekiste (1969) – Kazanskiy
- King Lear (1970) – Kent
- Risk (1971) – General razvedki
- Poslanniki vechnosti (1971) – Minister
- Nochnaya smena (1971) – Biryukov
- Yegor Bulychyov and Others (1972) – Mokei Bashkin
- Lyogkaya voda (1972) – Khovrin
- Zhizn na greshnoy zemle (1973)
- Nadezhda (1973) – General
- Opoznanie (1973) – Judge Stanley
- Kto, esli ne ty... (1974) – Pyotr Petrovich Komarov
- Stoyanka – tri chasa (1975) – Direktor zavoda
- Georgiy Sedov (1975) – Petrov-Gimalaysky
- V ozhidanii chuda (1975) – Nikolai Fomich
- Dozhit do rassveta (1977)
