= Trieste (film) =

- Directed by: France Štiglic
- Written by: France Bevk
- Cinematography: Rudi Vaupotič
- Edited by: Milka Mađura
- Music by: Marijan Lipovšek
- Production company: Triglav Film
- Distributed by: Viba Film
- Release date: 5 January 1951
- Running time: 81 minutes
- Country: Yugoslavia
- Language: Slovene

Trieste (Slovene: Trst) is a 1951 Yugoslav drama film directed by France Štiglic.

== Cast ==
- Mira Bedenk as Anda
- Angelo Benetelli as Penko
- Sandro Bianchi as Donati
- Vjekoslav Bonifačić as Burole
- Alessandro Damiani as Karlo
- Avgusta Danilova as Stara zenica
- Flavio della Noce as Piero
- Josip Fišer as Menih
- Eliza Gerner as Anamarija
- Franc Gunzer as Komisar mesta
- Pavla Kovič as Vratarjeva hci
- Slavica Kraševec as Marijeta
- Andrej Kurent as Ivan
- Anica Kuznik as Vida
- Marcello Micheli as Moro
- Carlo Montini as Oliva
- Lojze Potokar as Just
- Stane Potokar as Komandir mesta
- Modest Sancin as Galjof
- Stane Sever as Borut
- Zvone Sintic as Tadeo
- Pero Skerl as Pahor
- Vladimir Skrbinšek as Schmedke
- Dusan Skredl as Porocnik
- Joze Zupan as Sila
- Mirko Župančić as Sergej

== Bibliography ==
- Silvan Furlan. Filmography of Slovene feature films. Slovenski gledališki in filmski muzej, 1994.
