= Vladimir Belokurov =

- Владимир Белокуров
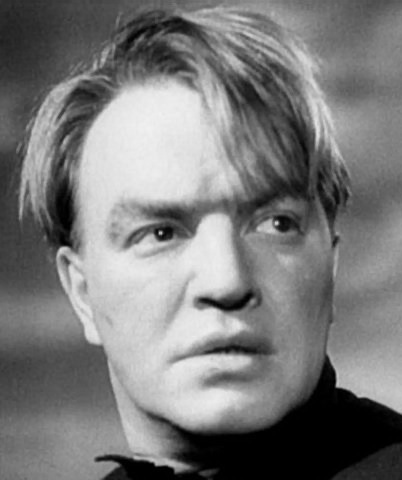
- Born: 8 July 1904; Kazan Governorate, Russian Empire
- Died: 28 January 1973 (aged 68); Moscow, Russian SFSR, Soviet Union
- Occupation: Actor
- Years active: 1918–1973

Vladimir Vyacheslavovich Belokurov (Note: Russian: Владимир Вячеславович Белокуров, romanized: Vladimir Vyacheslavovich Belokurov) (July 8, 1904 – January 28, 1973) was a Soviet and Russian actor and pedagogue. He was a People's Artist of the USSR (1965) and won the Stalin Prize of the second degree.

== Selected filmography ==
- The House of the Dead (1932) as Stammering Announcer
- Dawn of Paris (1937) as Prosecutor Rigot
- Valery Chkalov (1941) as Valery Chkalov
- Sabuhi (1941) as Bestujev
- Military Secret (1945) as Peter Weininger, a.k.a. Petrov, a.k.a. Petronescu
- The Village Teacher (1947) as Bukov, kulak
- Zhukovsky (1950) as Sergey Chaplygin
- Secret Mission (1950) as Bormann
- Belinsky (1953) as Barsukov
- Silvery Dust (1953) as Upton Bruce
- A Fortress in the Mountains (1953) as Morrow
- The Great Warrior Skanderbeg (1953) as King
- The Boys from Leningrad (1954) as Vasiliy Tsvetkov, film director
- Mikhaylo Lomonosov (1955) as Prokop Andreevitch
- Son (1955) as Lavrov
- A Weary Road (1956) as Latkin
- Duel (1957) as Dits
- Avalanche (1959) as Ataman Shkuro
- Gloomy Morning (1959) as Lyova Zadov
- Vasily Surikov (1959) as Kuznetsov
- Dead Souls (1960) as Chichikov
- Resurrection (1960) as Maslennikov
- Striped Trip (1961) as boatswain
- Flower on the Stone (1962) as father of Christina
- Queen of the Gas Station (1963) as Medved
- Moscow — Genoa (1964) as David Lloyd George
- Across the Cemetery (1964) as Sazon Ivanovich Kulik
- Poka front v oborone (1965) as Shorokhov
- The Salvos of the Aurora Cruiser (1965) as Ministr
- Alpine Ballad (1966) as Austrian
- They're Calling, Open the Door (1966) as Sergey Korkin
- The Elusive Avengers (1967) as Otets-filosof
- The New Adventures of the Elusive Avengers (1968) as bandit, named "holy father-philosopher
- Honore de Balzac's Mistake (1969) as Zaritskiy
- Däli Kür (1969) as Semyonov
- Paytyun kesgisherits heto (1969)
- Crime and Punishment (1970) as innkeeper (uncredited)
- The Crown of the Russian Empire, or Once Again the Elusive Avengers (1971) as bandit, named holy father-philosopher
- Chipollino (1973) as Tomato (final film role)
