= The Boys from Leningrad =

- Russian: Запасной игрок
- Directed by: Semyon Timoshenko
- Written by: Semyon Timoshenko
- Starring: Georgy Vitsin; Vsevolod Kuznetsov; Elena Tyapkina; Pavel Kadochnikov; Tatyana Konyukhova; Valentina Ushakova
- Cinematography: Yevgeni Shapiro
- Edited by: A. Ruzanova
- Music by: Isaak Dunayevsky
- Production company: Lenfilm
- Release date: December 3, 1954
- Running time: 83 min.
- Country: Soviet Union
- Language: Russian

The Boys from Leningrad (Russian: Запасной игрок, romanized: Zapasnoy igrok) is a 1954 Soviet sports comedy film directed by Semyon Timoshenko.

The film tells the story of a promising young footballer who steps up to save his team both on the field and in goal, while navigating romantic rivalry and unexpected challenges on a journey to the Trade Unions Cup final.

== Plot ==
The factory football team "Blue Arrows" reaches the final of the Trade Unions Cup and sets off aboard the riverboat Rossiya to Sukhumi, where they are scheduled to face the favored team, "Vympel." However, the journey is filled with unexpected adventures before the decisive match.

Vasya Vesnushkin, a promising reserve striker for the "Blue Arrows," is smitten with a gymnast named Valya but fears she may prefer his arrogant older brother, Sasha, the team's star player. Meanwhile, aboard the boat, a young actor named Svetlanov, disguised as an elderly man named Dedushkin to prepare for a future role, is mistaken by researchers from the Institute of Gerontology for Professor Babushkin. A misunderstanding leads Sasha, after drinking wine, to insult the "elderly man" and challenge him to a boxing match. When Dedushkin reveals his true identity as Svetlanov, an amateur boxer, the team's coach forbids Sasha from participating. Instead, Vasya steps in to face Svetlanov. Despite being outmatched, Vasya's determination earns him a draw, gaining respect from all.

In Sukhumi, the coach decides to start Vasya instead of Sasha for the final match. Vasya scores two goals in the first half against "Vympel," but the team faces challenges when their goalkeeper, Starkin, injures his knee. Late in the second half, Starkin collapses and cannot continue, and the substitute goalkeeper is sidelined after a bee sting. The coach places Vasya in goal. In a dramatic finish, Vasya saves a penalty kick after the final whistle, securing a 3–2 victory for the "Blue Arrows."

With the team's triumph, Valya accepts a gift from Vasya, signaling that she has grown fond of him, completing his journey of both personal and athletic success.

== Cast ==
- Georgy Vitsin as Vasya Vesnushkin
- Vsevolod Kuznetsov as Sasha Vesnushkin
- Elena Tyapkina as Vesnushkina
- Pavel Kadochnikov as Svetlanov
- Tatyana Konyukhova as Valya Oljeshko
- Valentina Ushakova as Galina Kartashova
- Mark Bernes as Lev Kolomyagin, coach
- Konstantin Adashevsky as Ivan Innokentyevich, factory director
- Vladimir Belokurov as Vasiliy Tsvetkov, filmmaker
- Pavel Pol as Dnjeprovskiy
- Boris Kokovkin as professor Babushkin
- Aleksandr Zhukov as Spiridon Violjetov
- Elvira Lutsenko as Lyubov Maljutkina
- Andrey Tutyshkin as Pyotr Andreyevich
