= Valentin Turkin =

Screenwriter, film critic, and film theorist

- Born: 6 February 1887; Novocherkassk, Don Voisko Oblast, Russian Empire
- Died: 10 January 1958 (age 70); Moscow, Soviet Union
- Occupations: screenwriter, film critic, teacher
- Years active: 1915-1958 (film)
- Awards: Order of the Red Banner of Labour (1944)

Valentin Konstantinovich Turkin (Russian: Валентин Константинович Туркин; 6 February 1887 – 10 January 1958) was a screenwriter, film critic, and film theorist active in the Soviet Union.

Turkin was a founder of the Gerasimov Institute of Cinematography.

== Selected filmography ==
- The Tailor from Torzhok (1925)
- The Stationmaster (1925)
- The Girl with a Hatbox (1927)
- The Ghost That Never Returns (1930)

== Bibliography ==
- Youngblood, Denise. Movies for the Masses: Popular Cinema and Soviet Society in the 1920s. Cambridge University Press, 1993.
