= Bed and Sofa =

1927 film by Abram Room

- Directed by: Abram Room
- Produced by: Sovkino Studio
- Starring: Nikolai Batalov; Lyudmila Semyonova; Vladimir Fogel
- Cinematography: Grigorii Giber
- Release date: 15 March 1927
- Running time: 75 minutes
- Country: USSR
- Language: Silent

Bed and Sofa (Russian: Третья Мещанская, romanized: Tretya Meshchanskaya) is a 1927 Soviet silent film directed by Abram Room.

== Plot ==
Bed and Sofa, full film

The film is set during the years of the Soviet New Economic Policy. A printer named Vladimir arrives in Moscow from the countryside. He temporarily moves into the apartment of his wartime friend, Nikolai, on 3rd Meshchanskaya Street, where he sleeps on the sofa. Nikolai, who works as a stonemason, is charming and good-natured, but also dictatorial and egocentric. Lyudmila, Nikolai's wife, is resentful of the constant demand of household duties and their cramped living conditions. Although she is unhappy at first with the new arrangements, Vladimir wins her over with helpful behavior and gifts. Lyudmila grows infatuated with their guest, as he treats her with a kindness that her husband lacks. She does not hide her feelings for Vladimir from Nikolai, and, with the three of them living together, their relationships become increasingly tangled.

When Nikolai leaves town for work, Vladimir begins seducing Lyudmila, taking her on a plane ride over Moscow. When he returns from his trip, Nikolai is relegated to sleeping on the sofa; Vladimir has taken the role of "husband." Lyudmila begins sleeping with both men and eventually falls pregnant.

They send her to a private clinic to undergo an abortion. As Lyudmila is waiting, she sees a baby in a carriage on the sidewalk below. She makes the decision to take control of her life, keep the baby, and get away from Moscow. Lyudmila boards a train departing from Moscow, leaving Nikolai and Vladimir behind.

== Cast ==
- Nikolai Batalov as Nikolai (Kolia)
- Lyudmila Semyonova as Lyudmila (Liuda)
- Vladimir Fogel as Vladimir (Volodia)
- Leonid Yurenyov as The Porter
- Yelena Sokolova as The Nurse
- Mariya Yarotskaya as The Peasant

== Themes ==
The film is a psychological drama that lay bare the dysfunctions and contradiction of early Soviet society. It features a frank portrayal of sexual manners in the 1920s as well as the living conditions in Moscow at the time, which are in sharp contrast to the picture of a state where everything was to be the perfect idyll of Soviet life. Abram Room had intended not only to make a picture exploring the social problems of urban life during the last years of the New Economic Policy (1921–28), but specifically to support the state's campaign against the sexual freedom of the revolutionary years and abortion on demand.

== Production ==
During lunch at a film studio cafeteria, screenwriter Viktor Shklovsky told Abram Room a plot idea for a short screenplay. He had previously pitched the same story to director Yuri Tarich, but Tarich had turned it down. Shklovsky had found the story in the pages of Komsomolskaya Pravda, a tabloid newspaper. The newspaper reported how, at a maternity hospital, two men came to see the same newborn child, as the young mother was married to both of them at the same time. The people involved were young Komsomol members, students at workers' faculties. They called it "a love of three," claiming that Komsomol love knew no jealousy.

Abram Room sensed that the story had great potential for actors. The screenplay began to take shape in Moscow, although he didn’t have time to finish it; Room had to urgently leave for Crimea to shoot the documentary Jews on the Land. The script was eventually written by him on the express train from Moscow to Sevastopol.

The film was shot on location in Moscow.

== Reception ==
In a 2008 survey of their 10 favourite Russian films by Seans magazine, director Vadim Abdrashitov and film critics Veronika Khlebnikova and Andrey Shemyakin listed it tenth, and film historians Pyotr Bagrov and Aleksandr Deryabin listed it ninth. The Russian Guild of Film Critics placed Bed and Sofa in its list of the 100 best films in the history of Russian cinema.
