= Sofya Levitina =

Soviet actress

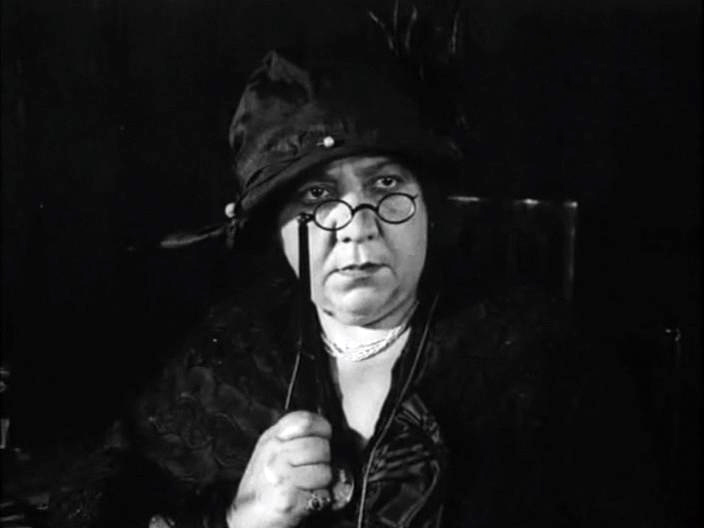
- Born: Sofya Levitina; 9 September 1877
- Died: 1950
- Occupation: Actress
- Years active: 1924–1944

Sofya Levitina (Russian: София Левитина) was a Soviet actress.

== Selected filmography ==
- 1924 — Aelita
- 1934 — Boule de Suif
- 1944 — The Wedding
