= La Traversée de Paris (film) =

- Theatrical release poster
- Directed by: Claude Autant-Lara
- Screenplay by: Jean Aurenche; Pierre Bost
- Based on: "La Traversée de Paris" by Marcel Aymé
- Produced by: Henry Deutschmeister
- Starring: Jean Gabin; Bourvil; Louis de Funès
- Cinematography: Jacques Natteau
- Edited by: Madeleine Gug
- Music by: René Cloërec
- Production companies: Franco-London Film; Continentale Produzione
- Distributed by: Variety Distribution
- Release date: 26 October 1956 (France)
- Running time: 80 minutes
- Countries: France; Italy
- Language: French
- Box office: $18,297 (US re-release)

La Traversée de Paris ("The trip across Paris") is a 1956 French comedy-drama directed by Claude Autant-Lara, starring Jean Gabin, Bourvil and Louis de Funès. (Note: The film is known under the titles: "Four Bags Full" (USA), "Pig Across Paris" (UK), "The Trip Across Paris" (International English title).) It is set in occupied Paris in 1942 and tells the story of two men who defy the curfew to deliver pork for the black market. The film is very loosely based on the short story "La traversée de Paris" by Marcel Aymé.

The film competed at the 17th Venice International Film Festival, where Bourvil won the Volpi Cup for Best Actor. The cynical portrayal of the occupation era was unconventional and made the film controversial upon the original release.

== Plot ==
In Paris in 1942, under German occupation, unemployed taxi-driver Marcel Martin makes his living delivering parcels by night for the black market. One evening he must carry by foot, to the other side of the capital, four suitcases containing pork meat. He goes to the basement of a grocer named Jambier and plays the accordion to mask the noise while the animal is slaughtered. Martin then goes with his wife Mariette to the restaurant where he must meet his accomplice, but learns that the man has been arrested by the police.

A stranger then enters the restaurant and, after a misunderstanding, Martin invites him to share his meal and replace his former accomplice. This decision quickly turns out calamitous as the new character, named Grandgil, isn't very co-operative. He first asks for a drastic increase in payment, terrorizing the unfortunate grocer Jambier. Then, taking a dislike to the owners of a bar where the two hide with their suitcases of fresh meat to avoid policemen checking papers, he starts wrecking the place. Outside again, when they are stopped by a lone policeman, he head butts the man to the ground. When two more policeman approach, he starts talking loudly in German and they discreetly withdraw.

The two drop into the hotel where Martin lives with his wife and Grandgil makes a quick phone call, again speaking in German. An air raid begins, and the two take refuge in what turns out to be Grandgil's apartment. Martin is stunned to discover that his companion is in fact a world-famous painter, who has agreed to come along mainly for his own entertainment and insists on returning the money he extorted.

When they at last arrive at their destination, the place is locked up. Angry after all the danger they have run, they rattle the bars and shout. The noise attracts a German patrol, who take them off to military headquarters. A German major recognizes the celebrated painter Grandgil and is about to release the two when news comes in that a German colonel has been shot. All French suspects in the building are bundled into a lorry, from which the major is able to save only Grandgil.

Years later, Grandgil is leaving Paris for a holiday and a porter carries his bags to the train. When Grandgil gives him a tip, he recognises that it is Martin. "Still carrying suitcases?" he says as the train moves off.

== Cast ==
- Jean Gabin : Grandgil, the painter
- Bourvil : Marcel Martin, taxi driver in unemployment
- Louis de Funès : Jambier, the grocer
- Jeannette Batti : Mariette Martin, wife of Marcel
- Jacques Marin : the boss of the restaurant
- Robert Arnoux : Marchandot, the butcher pork butcher
- Georgette Anys : Lucienne Couronne, the coffee maker
- Jean Dunot : Alfred Couronne, the proprietor
- Monette Dinay : Mrs Jambier, l'épicière
- René Hell : the father Jambier
- Myno Burney : Angèle Marchandot, la bouchère, charcutière
- Harald Wolff : German commander (uncredited)
- Bernard Lajarrige : a policeman
- Anouk Ferjac : la jeune fille lors de l'alerte (uncredited)
- Hubert Noël : le gigolo arrêté (uncredited)
- Béatrice Arnac : prostitute (uncredited)
- Jean/Hans Verner : le motard allemand
- Laurence Badie : la serveuse du restaurant
- Claude Vernier : le secrétaire allemand de la Kommandantur
- Hugues Wanner : le père de Dédé

== Production ==
The film is based on Marcel Aymé's short story "La traversée de Paris", featured in the 1947 collection Le vin de Paris. The production was led by France's Franco-London-Film in collaboration with Italy's Continentale Produzione. Photography took place from 7 April to 9 June 1956. The film was shot entirely in studio, at Franstudio's facilities in Saint-Maurice, Val-de-Marne.

== Release ==
The premiere took place at the 17th Venice International Film Festival where the film played in the main competition. It was released in France on 26 October the same year, distributed by Gaumont. It had 4,895,769 admissions in France, the fourth most admissions for films released in 1956. The film was the second biggest grosser in Paris in the 1956-1957 season with a gross of $489,000 on admissions of 1,198,306.

== Reception ==
=== Critical response ===
François Truffaut wrote in 1956: "I admire, without any real reservations, La Traversée de Paris. I think it's a complete success because Autant-Lara has finally found the subject he's been waiting for—a plot that is made in his own image, a story that his truculence, tendency toward exaggeration, roughness, vulgarity, and outrage, far from serving badly, elevates to an epic. ... A verve much like Céline's and an insistent ferocity dominate the movie, but it is saved from meanness by a few emotional notes that overwhelm us, particularly those in the final scenes."

=== Accolades ===
Bourvil received the Volpi Cup for Best Actor at the Venice Film Festival. The French Syndicate of Cinema Critics gave the film its award for best French film of the year. Gabin was nominated for the BAFTA Award for Best Foreign Actor.

== Legacy ==
The film was initially controversial in France as it broke several taboos in its depiction of the occupation. Earlier depictions had been heroic dramas and made the French Resistance appear as almost unanimously supported by the public. La Traversée de Paris broke new ground with its use of dark humour, its depiction of cynical black-market trade, its portrayal of collaborators as ordinary people and by refraining from portraying any part as innocent victims. Later critics have noted that this picture of the era is far more nuanced than the conventional ones. The film was also important for Bourvil's career and established him as a major actor.
