= A Man Before His Time =

- Russian poster
- Russian: Преждевременный человек
- Directed by: Abram Room
- Written by: Abram Room; Maxim Gorky
- Starring: Igor Kvasha; Anastasiya Vertinskaya; Aleksandr Kalyagin; Boris Ivanov; Nina Shatskaya; Valentin Smirnitskiy
- Cinematography: Leonid Kraynenkov; Vladimir Stepanov
- Edited by: A. Klebanov
- Music by: Evgeniy Krylatov
- Production company: Mosfilm
- Release date: 1971
- Running time: 102 minutes
- Country: Soviet Union
- Language: Russian

A Man Before His Time (Russian: Преждевременный человек) is a 1971 Soviet drama film directed by Abram Room. It is based on Yakov Bogomolov, an unfinished play by Maxim Gorky (ca. 1916).

== Plot ==
The film is set in the Karadag coast of the Crimea at the turn of the 20th century. It tells about the engineer Bogomolov, who is so passionate about his work that he does not notice how his wife cheats on him and his friends betray him.

== Cast ==
- Igor Kvasha as Yakov Bogomolov
- Anastasiya Vertinskaya as Olga Borisovna
- Aleksandr Kalyagin as Nikon Bukeyev
- Boris Ivanov as Uncle Jean
- Nina Shatskaya as Nina Arkadyevna
- Valentin Smirnitskiy as Boris Ladygin
- Irina Varley as Verochka
- Anatoliy Adoskin as Naum
- Tatyana Lukyanova as Dunyasha
