= Vladimir Skrbinšek =

Slovenian actor

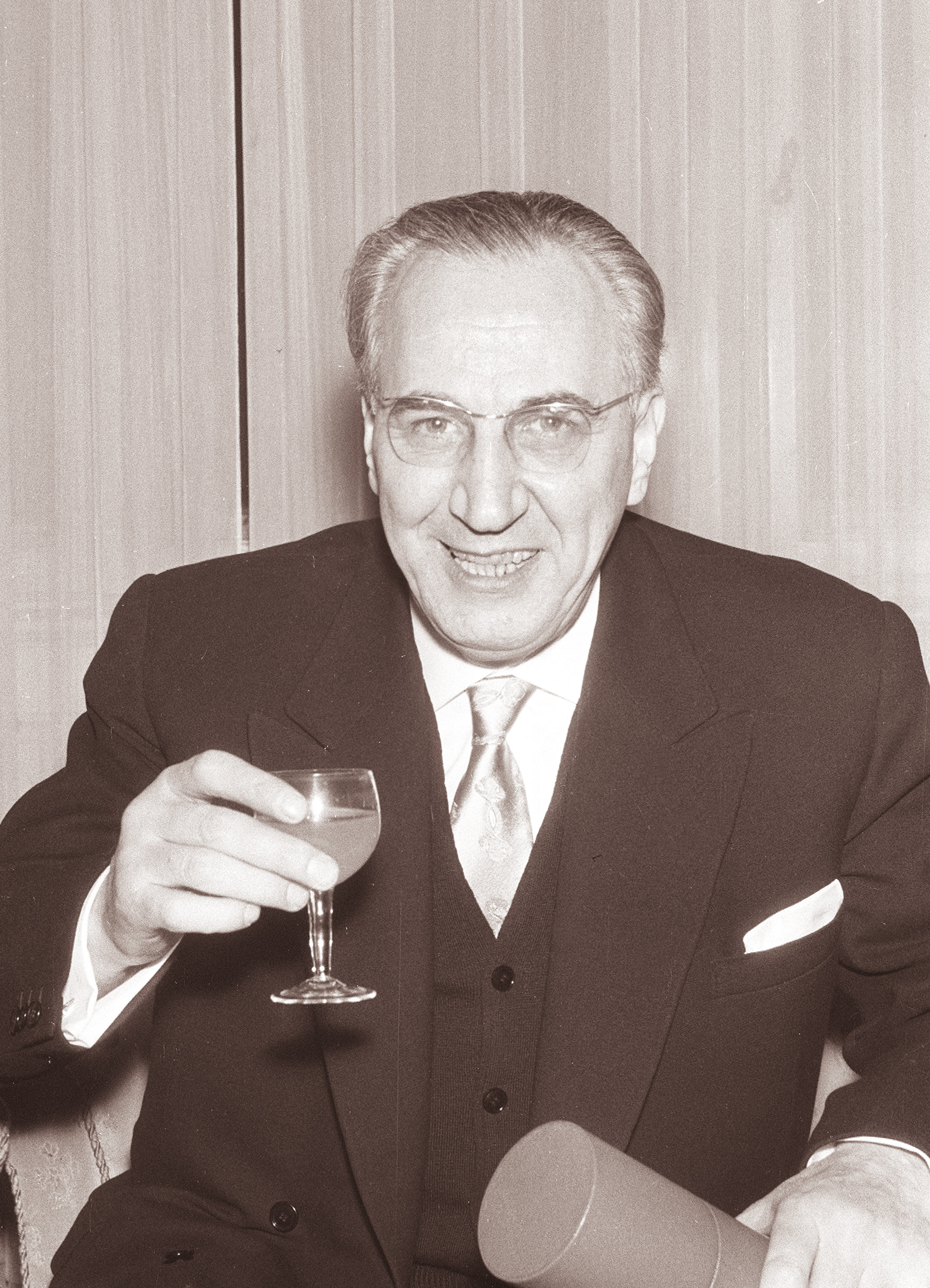
- Skrbinšek in 1961
- Born: 2 October 1902; Ljubljana, Austro-Hungarian Empire
- Died: 1 September 1987 (aged 84); Ljubljana, Yugoslavia
- Occupation: Actor

Vladimir Skrbinšek (1902–1987) was a Slovenian stage and film actor.

== Filmography ==
Year	Title	Role	Notes
1946	In the Mountains of Yugoslavia	Hamdija	
1951	Trieste	Schmedke	
1952	Svet na Kajžarju	Trinkhaus	
1953	The Parvenus	Tine pl. Mali	
1961	Balada o trobenti in oblaku	Porocnik SS	
1961	Druzinski dnevnik	Brglez	
1963	Samorastniki	Karnicnik	
1964	Zarota		
1966	Amandus	First lutheran	

== Bibliography ==
- Daniel J. Goulding. Liberated Cinema: The Yugoslav Experience, 1945-2001. Indiana University Press, 2002.
