= Miklukho-Maklai (film) =

- Russian: Миклухо-Маклай
- Directed by: Aleksandr Razumny
- Written by: Aleksei Speshnyov; V. Volkenshtejn
- Starring: Yevgeny Samoylov; Sergei Lukyanov; Aleksandra Vasilyeva; Tatyana Okunevskaya; Maya Markova
- Cinematography: Boris Petrov
- Music by: Nikolai Kryukov
- Release date: 1947
- Country: Soviet Union

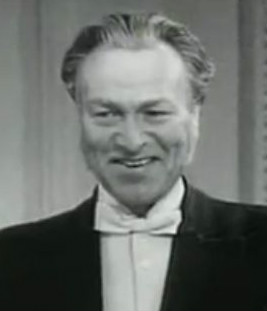
Aleksei Maksimov as Robertson in Mikluho-Maklai (1947)

Miklukho-Maklai, (Russian: Миклухо-Маклай) is a 1947 Soviet biographical drama film directed by Aleksandr Razumny.

The film tells about the famous Russian ethnographer Nicholas Miklouho-Maclay and his travels to Australia and Oceania, where he watched the natives.

== Plot ==
In 1869, Miklouho-Maclay presents a proposal to the Geographical Society emphasizing the importance of studying the native populations of Oceania's islands. With the society's modest financial backing, he sets sail aboard the naval vessel Vityaz to New Guinea to begin his research.

Determined not to impose himself on the residents of a coastal village, Miklouho-Maclay establishes a home at a distance, built by the sailors of the *Vityaz*. His primary objective becomes understanding the world around him. Observing the local islanders, he is fascinated by their craftsmanship in constructing elaborate boats and the use of carvings on canoes, trees, and shields, which he identifies as a primitive form of ideographic writing. Despite their simple tools, their dexterity in various tasks amazes him. Miklouho-Maclay meticulously records his findings in a notebook he has kept since his arrival on the island.

The harsh conditions of life in the tropical forest take a toll on Miklouho-Maclay's health, leading to a serious illness. His companions also face great challenges; a dark-skinned adolescent succumbs to fever, followed by the death of Tomson, a white servant who confesses on his deathbed that he had been spying on the Russian scientist under orders from Dr. Brandler. After years of exploration, Miklouho-Maclay returns to Sydney, where he reunites with and marries Margaret Robertson, who becomes his devoted partner in scientific work. However, the incursion of the "German Association for the South Seas" into New Guinea and Dr. Brandler's involvement forces Miklouho-Maclay into a difficult struggle to defend his perspective, shaped by years of travel and research.

== Starring ==
- Sergei Kurilov as Nikolai Miklukho-Maklaj (as S. Kurilov)
- Galina Grigoreva as Margaret Robertson (as G. Grigoryeva)
- Mikhail Astangov as Dr. Brandler (as M. Astangov)
- Aleksey Maksimov as Robertson (as A. Maksimov)
- Georgiy Budarov as Thompson (as G. Budarov)
- Valentina Kuindzhi as Lawrence (as V. Kuindzhi)
- Weyland Rodd as Chief Oor (as Veiland Rod)
- Lev Fenin as Governor (as L. Fenin)
- Jim Komogorov as African Boy (as Dzhim Komogorov)
- Emmanuil Geller as Kafa (as E. Geller)
- Robert Robinson as Malu
- Arkadi Arkadyev
- I. Bragintseva
- Nikolay Volkov
- Aleksey Zubov
- V. Keropyan
- V. Makovejsky
- Leonid Pirogov
- V. Poletimsky
- P. Orlovsky
- A. Savelyev
