= Aelita (film) =

1924 Soviet film

Aelita: Queen of Mars
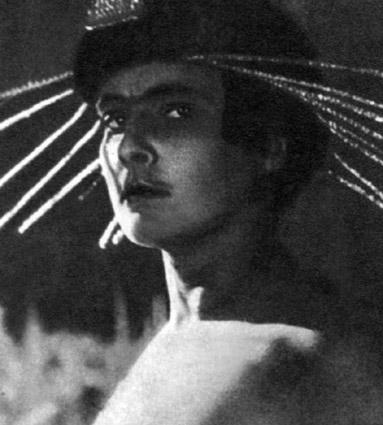
- Yulia Solntseva as Aelita
- Directed by: Yakov Protazanov
- Written by: Fedor Ozep
- Starring: Nikolai Tseretelli; Valentina Kuindzhi; Yulia Solntseva; Pavel Pol; Igor Ilyinsky; Nikolai Batalov; Vera Orlova
- Cinematography: Emil Schünemann; Yuri Zhelyabuzhsky
- Production company: Mezhrabpom-Rus
- Release date: 25 September 1924
- Running time: 113 minutes
- Country: Soviet Union
- Languages: Silent film Russian intertitles

Aelita: Queen of Mars with English intertitles

Aelita (Russian: Аэли́та, pronounced [ɐɛˈlʲitə]), also known as Aelita: Queen of Mars, is a 1924 Soviet silent science fiction film directed by Yakov Protazanov and produced at the Mezhrabpom-Rus film studio. It was based on Alexei Tolstoy's 1923 novel of the same name. Nikolai Tseretelli and Valentina Kuindzhi were cast in leading roles.

Though the main focus of the story are the daily lives of a small group of people during the post-civil war Soviet Russia, the film's enduring importance comes from its early sci-fi elements. It primarily tells of an engineer Mstislav Sergeyevich Los (Russian: Лось) traveling to Mars in a rocket ship, where he leads a popular uprising against the ruling group of Elders, with the support of Queen Aelita who has fallen in love with him after watching him through a telescope. In its performances in the cinemas in Leningrad, Dmitri Shostakovich played on the piano the music he provided for the film.

In the United States, Aelita was edited and titled by Benjamin De Casseres for release in 1929 as Aelita: Revolt of the Robots.

== Plot ==
Moscow, 1921. A mysterious wireless message is received by various stations: its text is 'Anta Odeli Uta'. Someone facetiously suggests it has come from Mars in order to tease Los (Nikolai Tseretelli), an engineer who is obsessed with the idea of going to Mars. This inspires him to daydream about Mars and a strange civilization there. The Martians include Queen Aelita (Yuliya Solntseva); Tuskub (Konstantin Eggert), the actual ruler; and Ikhoshka (Aleksandra Peregonets), Aelita's mischievous maid. They live in a society where aristocrats rule over slaves who are confined underground and put into cold storage when not required.

Los's wife Natasha (Valentina Kuindzhi) is pestered by Erlikh (Pavel Pol), a bourgeois playboy before the revolution who is now a dishonest minor official. He uses his connections to steal a large amount of sugar with the intention of selling it on the black market. Los, who has seen Erlikh making up to Natasha but has not seen her rejecting him, becomes jealous.

Los continues to daydream: he imagines that Aelita has access to a telescope by which she can see people on Earth and has become attracted to him.

Spiridonov (Nikolai Tseretelli again), an intellectual engineer and friend of Los's, is being quietly swindled by Erlikh. He disappears; a would-be detective, Kratsov (Igor Ilyinsky) (who has been rejected by the police) suspects Spiridonov to be guilty of the theft of the sugar, because of his disappearance.

Los's jealousy gets out of control and he shoots Natasha. Disguising himself as Spiridonov with a wig, false beard and glasses, he goes into hiding and makes a plan to escape to Mars in a rocket ship he has been constructing. A friend of his, Gusev (Nikolai Batalov), an ex-soldier, agrees to go with him. They take off, not knowing at first that Kratsov has stowed away (thinking he has been following Spiridonov and not realizing he is on a spaceship). Los confuses Kratsov by removing the disguise.

They land on Mars. Tuskub orders them killed, ignoring Aelita's pleas for their safety. Kratsov is taken before Tuskub and demands that the soldiers arrest the other two: he is promptly arrested. The chief astronomer comes to Aelita and tells her where Los's ship has landed; she instructs her maid to kill him. The maid is arrested and sent to the slaves' caves – Gusev, who has taken a fancy to her, follows.

Aelita and Los meet and fall in love, though Los occasionally sees her as Natasha (so does the audience). They are arrested and sent to the caves.

Gusev tells the slaves of his own country's revolution and foments a revolt, which Aelita takes command of. Tuskub is overthrown and the army sides with Aelita. She commands them to fire on the workers and herd them back to the caves – she intends to rule Mars herself. Disgusted, Los kills Aelita (seeing her as Natasha as he does so).

Suddenly back on Earth, it is clear that all this is a daydream. Erlikh is arrested for the murder of Spiridonov. A poster on a wall advertises a maker of tires – 'Anta Odeli Uta': the wireless message had been an advertisement. Los had not injured or killed Natasha; he burns his spaceship plans and promises to stop daydreaming.

== Cast ==
- Yuliya Solntseva as Aelita, Queen of Mars
- Igor Ilyinsky as Kravtsov, Amateur Sleuth
- Nikolai Tseretelli as Engineer Los / Evgeni Spiridonov
- Nikolay Batalov as Gusev, Red Army Soldier
- Vera Orlova as Nurse Masha, Gusev's Wife
- Valentina Kuindzhi as Natasha, Los' Wife (as Vera Kuindzhi)
- Pavel Pol as Viktor Erlikh, Sugar Profiteer
- Konstantin Eggert as Tuskub, Ruler of Mars
- Yuri Zavadsky as Gol, Radiant Energy Tower Guardian
- Aleksandra Peregonets as Ikhoshka, Aelita's Maidservant
- Sofya Levitina as President House Committee

== Aelita as the first Soviet blockbuster ==
In 2014 Aleksandr Ignatenko published the book Aelita as the First Attempt to Create a Blockbuster in Russia in which he describes a massive advertising campaign before the screening and argues that Aelita had all features of a blockbuster.

About half a year before the screening of the film the newspaper Кино-Газета [Cinema Newspaper] started publishing advertisements with a weird text "АНТА… ОДЭЛИ… УТА…" [ANTA… ODELI… UTA…]. Some time later these started to be accompanied with the "explanation" that the radio stations all over the world started receiving a mysterious signal. As the premiere neared the official Communist Party newspaper Pravda published the signal as a more transparent hint: Anta… odELI… uTA…, and finally it was incorporated into the advertisement of the premiere.

== Reception ==
While popular with the public, Aelita was out of favor with critics, who declared it ideologically improper.

Frederik Pohl noted that the sole Soviet space film worthy of Aelita appeared half a century later: Andrei Tarkovsky’s Solaris.

In a retrospective on Soviet science fiction, British filmmaker Alex Cox remarking on BFI Southbank's celebration of "Eastern Bloc science fiction" called Aelita "Strangest of these [...] in which the human pastime of kissing creates turmoil on the red planet."

== Legacy ==
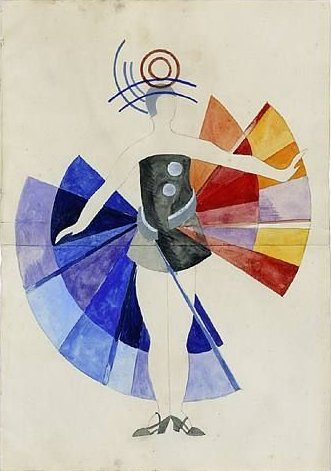
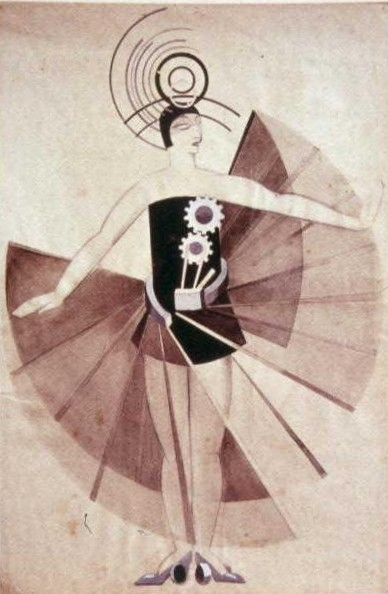
Costume designs by Aleksandra Ekster, 1924

One of the earliest full-length films about space travel, the most notable segment remains its remarkable constructivist Martian sets by Isaac Rabinovich and Victor Simov and costumes designed by Aleksandra Ekster. Their influence can be seen in a number of later films, including the Flash Gordon serials and probably Fritz Lang's Metropolis and Woman in the Moon and the more recent Liquid Sky.

Parts of the plot were loosely adapted for the 1951 film Flight to Mars.

J. Hoberman of The Village Voice wrote that the 1960 American film Beyond the Time Barrier "suggests an impoverished remake" of Aelita.

== See also ==
- Interplanetary Revolution, a 1924 Soviet animation film
- List of films set on Mars
