= Tommy (1931 film) =

1931 film

- Directed by: Yakov Protazanov
- Written by: Yakov Protazanov
- Based on: Bronepoyezd 14-69; 1927 play by Vsevolod Ivanov
- Starring: Aleksandr Zhutaev; Mikhail Kedrov; Vasili Kovrigin
- Cinematography: Konstantin Kuznetsov
- Music by: Alexander Shenshin
- Production company: Mezhrabpomfilm
- Release date: 1 November 1931
- Running time: 63 minutes (1,730 meters)
- Country: Soviet Union
- Language: Silent film with Russian intertitles

Tommy (Russian: Томми) is a 1931 Soviet drama film directed by Yakov Protazanov based on the play Armoured Train 14-69 by Vsevolod Ivanov.

== Plot summary ==
During the Russian Civil War in Siberia, a Bolshevik partisan unit is tasked with delivering captured ammunition to the Red Army, and along the way, an English soldier taken prisoner ultimately joins their cause.

== Cast ==
- Aleksei Temerin
- A. Zhutayev - British Soldier
- Mikhail Kedrov - Chinaman
- Vasili Kovrigin - Leader
- Vasili Vanin - Guide
- Ivan Chuvelyov - Vaska
- Nikolay Bogolyubov
- Viktor Kulakov]
- Viktor Tsoppi
- Vladimir Uralsky
