= Road to Life (1955 film) =

1955 film

Road to Life (Педагогическая поэма)
- Directed by: Aleksei Maslyukov; Mechislava Mayevskaya
- Written by: Aleksandr Makarenko; Iosif Manevich; Aleksei Maslyukov
- Produced by: A. Bocharov; V. Buzhilevich
- Starring: Vladimir Yemelyanov; Georgi Yumatov
- Cinematography: Ivan Shekker
- Edited by: I. Karpenko
- Music by: Anatoly Svechnikov
- Release date: 1955
- Running time: 111 minutes
- Country: Soviet Union
- Language: Russian

Road to Life (Russian: Педагогическая поэма, translit. Pedagogicheskaya poema) is a 1955 Soviet biographical drama film directed by Aleksei Maslyukov and Mechislava Mayevskaya and based on the book by Anton Makarenko. It was entered into the 1956 Cannes Film Festival.

== Plot ==
The story takes place in 1920. The first colony for homeless children, named after Gorky, was established in the village of Rakitnoye near Poltava. The children undergo a challenging journey from homelessness to becoming a cohesive community, overcoming hardships and adversities alongside the adults.

== Cast ==
- Vladimir Yemelyanov as Anton Semyonovich Makarenko
- Georgi Yumatov as Sasha Zadorov
- Mikhail Pokotilo as Kalina Ivanovich
- Yelena Litskanovich as Yekaterina Grigoryevna
- Nina Krachkovskaya as Lidia Petrovna
- Misha Chernov as Toska Solovyov
- Yuri Sarantsev as Grisha Burun
- Pavel Kadochnikov as Maxim Gorky
- P. Grubnik as Mityagan
- Ya. Panichev as Gud
- A. Chistik as Taranets
- Yulian Panich as Semyon Karabanov
- A. Susnin as Ivan Lapot
- K. Yevgenyev as Vetikovsky
- V. Zhinovyev as Zhorka Volkov
- Ye. Zhinovyev as Galamenko
