= Viktor Shklovsky =

Russian writer and literary theorist (1893–1984)

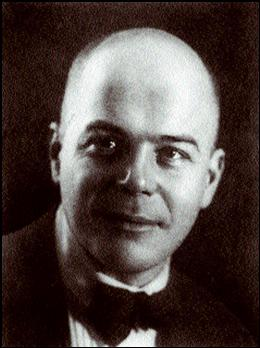
- Born: Viktor Borisovich Shklovsky; 24 January [O.S. 12 January] 1893; Saint Petersburg, Russian Empire
- Died: 6 December 1984 (aged 91); Moscow, Soviet Union

Education
- Education: Saint Petersburg Imperial University

Philosophical work
- School: Russian Formalism
- Main interests: Literary theory Literary criticism
- Notable works: Воскрешение слова (1914); Art as Device (1917); Zoo, or Letters Not About Love (1923); Theory of Prose (1925)
- Notable ideas: Ostranenie (1917)

Viktor Borisovich Shklovsky (Russian: Ви́ктор Бори́сович Шкло́вский, IPA: [ˈʂklofskʲɪj]; 24 January [O.S. 12 January] 1893 – 6 December 1984) was a Russian and Soviet literary theorist, critic, writer, and pamphleteer. He is one of the major figures associated with Russian formalism.

Shklovsky's Theory of Prose was published in 1925. Shklovsky himself is still praised as "one of the most important literary and cultural theorists of the twentieth century" (Modern Language Association Prize Committee); "one of the most lively and irreverent minds of the last century" (David Bellos); "one of the most fascinating figures of Russian cultural life in the twentieth century" (Tzvetan Todorov)

== Biography ==
Shklovsky was born in St. Petersburg, Russia. His father, Boris Vladimirovich Sklovsky, was a Lithuanian Jewish mathematician (with ancestors from Shklov in present-day Belarus) who converted to Russian Orthodoxy; his mother, Varvara Karlovna, née Bundel, was of German-Russian origin. He attended St. Petersburg University.

Following Russia's entry into the First World War in August 1914, he volunteered for the Imperial Russian Army in the autumn of 1914 and in 1915 became a driving trainer in an armoured-car unit in St. Petersburg. There, in 1916, he founded OPOYAZ (Obshchestvo izucheniya POeticheskogo YAZyka—Society for the Study of Poetic Language), one of the two groups (with the Moscow Linguistic Circle) that developed the critical theories and techniques of Russian Formalism.

Shklovsky participated in the February Revolution of 1917. Subsequently, the Russian Provisional Government sent him as an assistant Commissar to the Southwestern Front; he was wounded (July 1917) and won an award for bravery. After that he served in Persia as an assistant Commissar of the Russian Independent Caucasian Cavalry Corps in the Persian campaign.

Shklovsky returned to St. Petersburg in January 1918, after the October Revolution of November 1917. During the early stages of the Russian Civil War of 1917 to 1922 he opposed Bolshevism and took part in an anti-Bolshevik plot organised by members of the Socialist-Revolutionary Party. After the Cheka discovered the conspiracy, Shklovsky went into hiding, traveling in Russia and Ukraine, but was eventually pardoned in 1919 due to his connections with Maxim Gorky, and decided to abstain from political activity. His two brothers were executed by the Soviet régime (one in 1918, the other in 1937) and his sister died from hunger in St. Petersburg in 1919.

Shklovsky integrated into Soviet society and even served in the Red Army in the Civil War. However, in 1922 he had to go into hiding once again, as he was threatened with arrest and possible execution for his former political activities; he fled via Finland to Germany. In Berlin in 1923 he published his memoirs about the period 1917–22 under the title A Sentimental Journey: Memoirs (Sentimentalnoye puteshestviye, vospominaniya), alluding to A Sentimental Journey Through France and Italy (1768) by Laurence Sterne, an author Shklovsky much admired and whose digressive style had a powerful influence on his writing. In the same year he was allowed to return to the Soviet Union, not least because of an appeal to Soviet authorities that he included in the last pages of his epistolary novel Zoo, or Letters Not About Love (Zoo. Pisma ne o lyubvi ili Tretya Eloiza, Berlin: Helikon, 1923).

The Yugoslav scholar Mihajlo Mihajlov visited Shklovsky in 1963 and wrote: "I was much impressed by Shklovsky's liveliness of spirit, his varied interests and his enormous culture. When we said goodbye to Viktor Borisovich and started for Moscow, I felt that I had met one of the most cultured, most intelligent and best-educated men of our century."

He died in Moscow in 1984.

== Writer and theorist ==
In addition to literary criticism and biographies about such authors as Laurence Sterne, Maxim Gorky, Leo Tolstoy, and Vladimir Mayakovsky, he wrote a number of semi-autobiographical works disguised as fiction, which also served as experiments in his developing theories of literature.

Shklovsky is perhaps best known for developing the concept of ostranenie or defamiliarization (also translated as "estrangement") in literature. He explained the concept in 1917 in the important essay "Art as Technique" (also translated as "Art as Device"), which comprised the first chapter of his seminal Theory of Prose, first published in 1925. He argued for the need to turn something that has become over-familiar, like a cliché in the literary canon, into something revitalized:

And so, in order to return sensation to our limbs, in order to make us feel objects, to make a stone feel stony, man has been given the tool of art. The purpose of art, then, is to lead us to a knowledge of a thing through the organ of sight instead of recognition. By "enstranging" objects and complicating form, the device of art makes perception long and "laborious." The perceptual process in art has a purpose all its own and ought to be extended to the fullest. Art is a means of experiencing the process of creativity. The artifact itself is quite unimportant.

— Shklovsky, Viktor, Theory of Prose. Translated by Benjamin Sher, (Dalkey Archive Press, 1990), p. 6.

Among other things, Shklovsky also contributed the story/plot distinction (fabula/syuzhet), which separates out the sequence of events the work relates (the story, or fabula) from the sequence in which those events are presented in the work (the plot, or syuzhet).

Shklovsky's work pushes Russian Formalism towards understanding literary activity as integral parts of social practice, an idea that becomes important in the work of Mikhail Bakhtin and Russian and Prague School scholars of semiotics. Shklovsky's thought also influenced western thinkers, partly due to Tzvetan Todorov's translations of the works of Russian formalists in the 1960s and 1970s, including Tzvetan Todorov himself, Gerard Genette and Hans Robert Jauss.

== Film ==
Shklovsky was one of the very early serious writers on film. A collection of his essays and articles on film was published in 1923 (Literature and Cinematography, first English edition 2008). He was a close friend of director Sergei Eisenstein and published an extensive critical assessment of his life and works (Moscow 1976, no English translation).

Beginning in the 1920s and well into the 1970s Shklovsky worked as a screenwriter on numerous Soviet films (see Select Filmography below), a part of his life and work that, thus far, has seen very limited attention. In his book Third Factory Shklovsky reflects on his work in film, writing: "First of all, I have a job at the third factory of Goskino. Second of all, the name isn't hard to explain. The first factory was my family and school. The second was Opoyaz. And the third – is processing me at this very moment."

== Bibliography (English) ==
- A Sentimental Journey: Memoirs, 1917–1922 (1923, translated in 1970 by Richard Sheldon)
- Zoo, or Letters Not About Love (1923, translated in 1971 by Richard Sheldon) – epistolary novel
- Knight's Move (1923, translated in 2005) – collection of essays first published in the Soviet theatre journal, The Life of Art
- Literature and Cinematography (1923, translated in 2008)
- Theory of Prose (1925, translated in 1990) – essay collection
- Third Factory (1926, translated in 1979 by Richard Sheldon)
- The Hamburg Score (1928, translation by Shushan Avagyan published in 2017)
- Life of a Bishop's Assistant (1931, translation by Valeriya Yermishova published in 2017)
- A Hunt for Optimism (1931, translated in 2012 by Shushan Avagyan)
- Mayakovsky and his circle (1941, translated in 1972) – about the times of poet Vladimir Mayakovsky
- Leo Tolstoy (1963, translated in 1996)
- Bowstring: On the Dissimilarity of the Similar (1970, translated in 2011 by Shushan Avagyan)
- Energy of Delusion: A Book on Plot (1981, translated in 2007 by Shushan Avagyan)
- Shklovsky: A Reader (selected writings, translated and published in 2016)

== Select filmography (as writer) ==
- By the Law, 1926, director Lev Kuleshov, based on a story by Jack London
- Jews on Land, 1927, director Abram Room
- Bed and Sofa, 1927, director Abram Room
- The House on Trubnaya, 1928, director Boris Barnet
- The House of Ice, 1928, director Konstantin Eggert, based on the eponymous novel by Ivan Lazhechnikov
- Krazana, 1928, director Kote Mardjanishvili, based on the novel The Gadfly by Ethel Lilian Voynich
- Turksib, documentary, 1929, director Viktor Alexandrovitsh Turin
- Amerikanka, 1930, director Leo Esakya
- The Horizon, 1932, director Lev Kuleshov
- Minin and Pozharsky, 1939, director Vsevolod Pudovkin
- The Gadfly, 1956, director Aleksandr Faintsimmer, based on the eponymous novel by Ethel Lilian Voynich
- Kazaki, 1961, director Vasili Pronin

== Interviews ==
- Serena Vitale: Shklovsky: Witness to an Era, translated by Jamie Richards, Dalkey Archive Press, Champaign, London, Dublin, 2012 ISBN 978-1-56478-791-0 (Italian edition first pub. in 1979). The interview by Vitale is arguably the most important historical document covering the later years of Shklovsky’s life and work.
