= Three Comrades (1935 film) =

- Russian: Три товарища
- Directed by: Semyon Timoshenko
- Written by: Taisiya Zlatogorova; Aleksei Kapler
- Starring: Mikhail Zharov; Anatoly Goryunov; Nikolai Batalov
- Cinematography: Vladimir Danashevsky; Boris Kulikovich
- Music by: Isaak Dunayevsky
- Release date: 1935
- Running time: 95 min.
- Country: Soviet Union
- Language: Russian

Three Comrades (Russian: Три товарища, romanized: Tri tovarishcha) is a 1935 Soviet historical comedy-drama film directed by Semyon Timoshenko.

== Plot ==
The new chief of construction Zaitsev visits a small town in which his friends work (director of the paper factory Glinka and chief of the timber merchant Latsis). Zaitsev will paint himself as a group of rascals to expand the factory.

== Cast ==
- Mikhail Zharov as Zaitsev
- Anatoly Goryunov as Glinka
- Tatyana Guretskaya as Varya, Glinka's wife
- Nikolai Batalov as Latsis
- Nikolai Michurin as hustler
- Veronika Polonskaya as Irina, Latsis's wife
- Valeri Solovtsov as Gubenko
