= Igor Ozerov =

Russian speed skater

Personal information
- Nationality: Russian
- Born: 7 May 1968 (age 56); Moscow, Russia

Sport
- Sport: Short track speed skating

Igor Ozerov (born 7 May 1968) is a Russian short track speed skater. He competed in two events at the 1994 Winter Olympics.
