= The Immortal Garrison =

- Directed by: Zakhar Agranenko; Eduard Tisse
- Written by: Konstantin Simonov (writer)
- Starring: Vasili Makarov; Vladimir Yemelyanov; Nikolai Kryuchkov; Anatoli Chemodurov
- Cinematography: Eduard Tisse
- Music by: Veniamin Basner
- Release date: 1956
- Country: Soviet Union
- Language: Russian

The Immortal Garrison (Russian: Бессмертный гарнизон, Bessmertnyy garnizon) is a 1956 Soviet war film directed by Zakhar Agranenko and Eduard Tisse.

== Plot ==
The events take place in the Brest Fortress during the period of June 22 through July 20, 1941 at the beginning of The Great Patriotic War, at the moment when German forces invaded the Soviet Union in June 1941. At the outset, the film depicts the daily lives of the garrison's residents, including soldiers and their families. They plan for the future and try to ignore what they perceive as provocations from the Germans.

However, the tranquility is shattered when the first artillery shells strike the fortress, marking the beginning of a fierce assault. Unaware that the front line is retreating, the garrison holds its positions, resolutely fighting back and waiting for reinforcements that will never arrive. Despite the worsening situation, they continue their defense until the circumstances become utterly desperate.

== Cast ==
- Vasili Makarov as Baturin
- Vladimir Yemelyanov as Kondratiev
- Nikolai Kryuchkov as Kukharkov
- Anatoli Chemodurov as Rudenko
- Valentina Serova as Maria Nikolayevna
- Lidiya Sukharevskaya as Aleksandra Petrovna
- Antonina Bogdanova
- L. Naryshkina
- Gennadi Sajfulin
- Nadezhda Fandikova
- Feliks Yavorsky
- Vladimir Monakhov

== Soundtrack ==
Veniamin Basner began his career composing music for this film.
