= Sergei Tsenin =

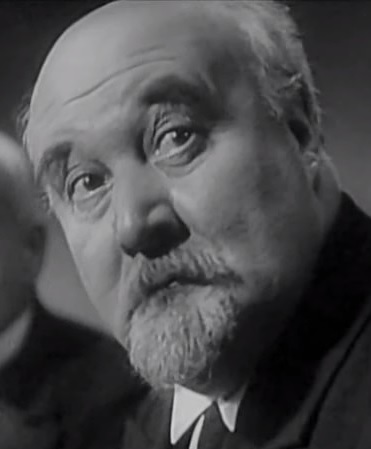
- Tsenin in 1937
- Born: Sergei Sergeyevich Tsenin; September 30, 1884; Ryazan, Russian Empire
- Died: June 13, 1964 (aged 79); Moscow, Soviet Union
- Occupations: Actor, director
- Years active: 1915–1964

Sergei Sergeyevich Tsenin (Russian: Сергей Сергеевич Ценин) was a Soviet and Russian actor and director. Honored Artist of the RSFSR (1935).

== Selected filmography ==
- 1930 — St. Jorgen's Day
- 1936 — Party Membership Card
- 1937 — Lenin in October
- 1939 — Squadron No. 5
- 1945 — Fifteen-Year-Old Captain
- 1946 — Cruiser 'Varyag'
- 1947 — Light over Russia
- 1948 — Michurin
- 1949 — Encounter at the Elbe
- 1951 — Przhevalsky
- 1951 — Sporting Honour
- 1957 — A Lesson in History
