= Yevgeni Ivanov-Barkov =

Yevgeni Alekseyevich Ivanov-Barkov (Russian: Евгений Алексеевич Иванов-Барков; 4 March 1892 – 18 May 1965) was a Soviet film director and screenwriter who had a significant role in the development of Turkmen cinema in the 1940s and 1950s.

== Filmography ==
- Poison (1927)
- Mabul (1927)
- Judas (1930)
- Dursun (1940)
- The Prosecutor (1941)
- The Faraway Bride (1948)
- Extraordinary Mission (1958)

== Bibliography ==
- Slapke, Swetlana (2013). "Fragments from the history of Turkmen cinema". In Michael Rouland; et al. (eds.). Cinema in Central Asia: Rewriting Cultural Histories. I.B.Tauris. pp. 90–104. ISBN 978-1-84511-901-0.
