= Judas (1930 film) =

1930 film

- Directed by: Evgeniy Ivanov-Barkov
- Written by: Pavel Blyakhin
- Cinematography: Grigori Giber
- Production company: Sovkino
- Release date: 6 January 1930
- Country: Soviet Union
- Languages: Silent; Russian intertitles

Judas (Russian: Иуда, romanized: Iuda) is a 1930 Soviet silent drama film directed by Evgeniy Ivanov-Barkov.

== Plot ==
The story is set during the Russian Civil War. The peasants of the village of Bogolyubovo, working monastery lands under debt bondage conditions, refuse to pay rent to the monastery upon hearing of the approaching Red Army. The abbot of the monastery appeals to a nearby regiment of White Army troops, requesting a punitive detachment to suppress the rebellious peasants.

A group of peasants, led by the Red partisan Fyodor, resists the punitive forces. However, at a critical moment in the battle, an elder named Jonah appears before the rebels, holding a cross and imploring them to refrain from bloodshed. This causes confusion among the peasants, allowing the White Army troops to gain the upper hand. Enraged by the uprising, the clergy, in alliance with the Whites, decide to punish the rebels harshly. The punitive detachment confiscates the peasants’ remaining livestock, loots their homes, and commits acts of violence.

Meanwhile, Jonah discovers that a woman is living at the monastery disguised as a novice, under the protection of the corrupt abbot. Learning too much about the abbot’s misdeeds, Jonah plans to deliver a condemning sermon but is imprisoned alongside the arrested peasants. A Red partisan detachment hiding in the forest rescues the imprisoned peasants and Jonah from execution.

The commander of the White Army unit suggests recruiting volunteers to fight the partisans. To sway the peasants, the priests stage a “miracle” involving a “weeping icon.” Some peasants join the White forces, but their deception is exposed by a monk named Onuphrius, who reveals the fraudulent nature of the miracle. Outraged by the deceit, the armed peasants, initially rallied against the “Red Antichrists,” turn their weapons against their true oppressors and join forces with the Red partisans.

== Cast ==
- Aleksandr Antonov
- Boris Ferdinandov
- Vasili Kovrigin
- Emma Tsesarskaya

== Bibliography ==
- Christie, Ian & Taylor, Richard. The Film Factory: Russian and Soviet Cinema in Documents 1896-1939. Routledge, 2012.
