= The Ghost That Never Returns =

1930 film

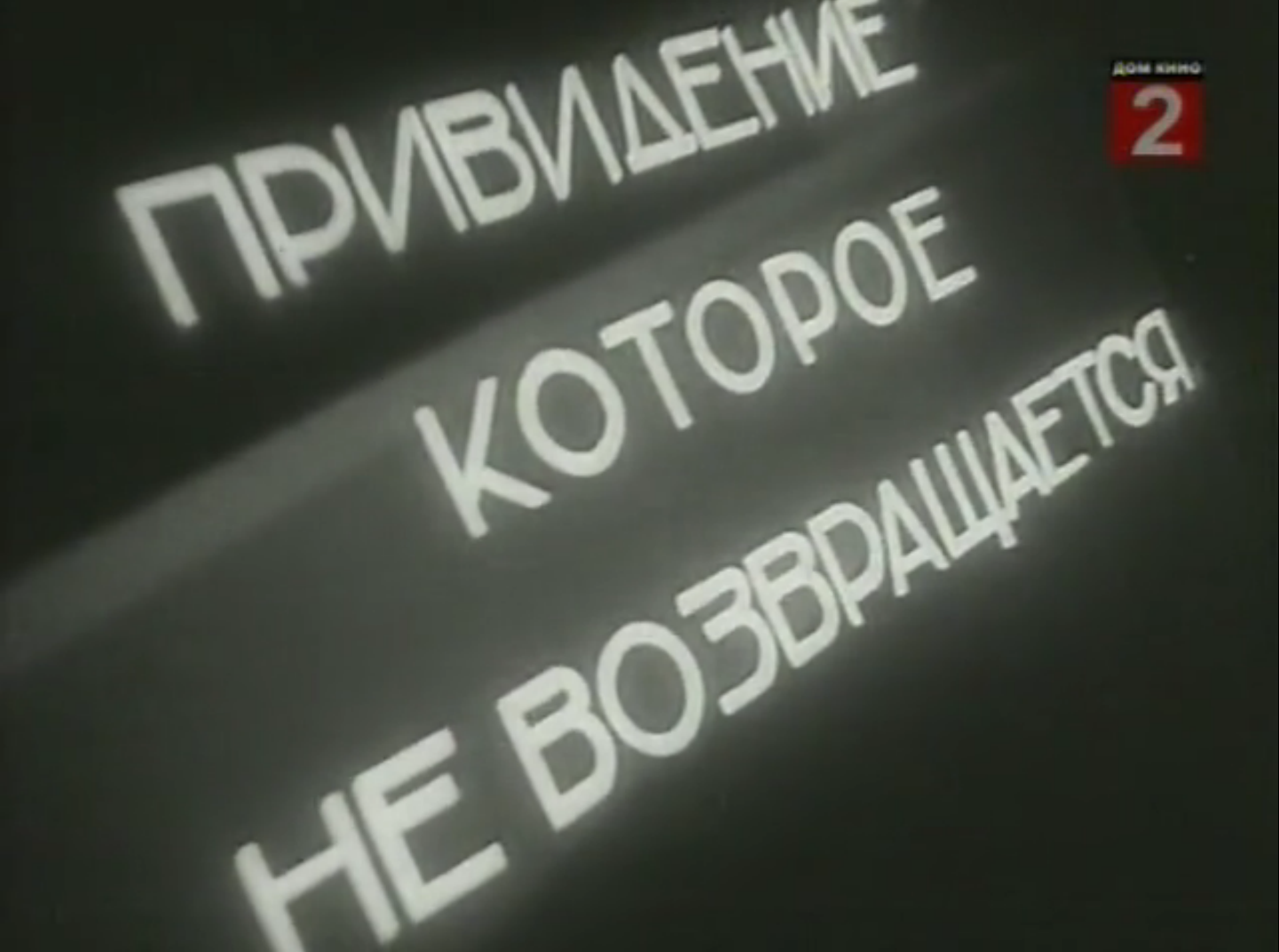
- Directed by: Abram Room
- Written by: Valentin Turkin
- Based on: novel by Henri Barbusse
- Produced by: Sovkino
- Starring: Boris Ferdinandov
- Cinematography: Dmitriy Feldman
- Edited by: Anna Kulganek
- Music by: Aleksandr Shenshin
- Release date: 15 March 1930
- Running time: 67 minutes
- Country: Russia
- Language: part silent/Russian...titles

The Ghost That Never Returns (1930) by Abram Room

The Ghost That Never Returns (Russian: Привидение, которое не возвращается, romanized: Prividenie, kotoroe ne vozvrashchaetsya) is a 1930 Soviet made part-sound drama film. It was directed by Abram Room based on a novel by Henri Barbusse.

It is preserved at the Library of Congress.

== Plot ==
The film follows protagonist José Real (Boris Ferdinandov) in his journey from prison to the real world. Real was imprisoned for life for trying to unionize a South American oilfield, and attempting a strike. After serving 10 years of his sentence, he is allowed one day to see his family, an honor from which he will not return. Unbeknownst to him, he is being followed by an agent with orders to assassinate him.

After hopping onto a train to meet his family, Real accidentally falls asleep, and misses his stop. Realizing this, he jumps from the train to try and get back to his stop. Enjoying his newfound freedom, Real once again falls asleep, this time on a boulder, before resuming his journey to his wife and child. He finally finds his house, which is empty of his wife. His father and son are there, however, and tell him of a new strike going on at the local Hillside Inn.

Real arrives at the strike, as does the agent trailing him and the police. Real is ordered to return to the prison. He declines, and declares he will not return. A firefight thus breaks out between the police, and the workers. The film ends as Real rushes home to brandish a gun to fight the police. As several workers are arrested and put in prison, they hear of Real leading the new strike.

== Cast ==
- Boris Ferdinandov - José Real
- A. Filippov - Syn Khose
- Karl Gurnyak - Rabochiy, chlen komiteta
- Dmitriy Kara-Dmitriev - Shef agentov
- Ivan Lavrov - Otets Khose
- A. Repin - Soblaznitel
- Maksim Shtraukh - Politseyskiy agent
- Gavril Tereekhov - Santander, lyubovnik
- Daniil Vvedenskiy - Nachalnik tyurmy
