= The Girl with a Hatbox =

- Official film poster
- Directed by: Boris Barnet
- Written by: Vadim Shershenevich; Valentin Turkin
- Starring: Anna Sten; Vladimir Mikhailov; Vladimir Fogel
- Music by: Sergei Vasilenko
- Production company: Mezhrabpom-Russ
- Release date: 19 April 1928
- Running time: 67 minutes
- Country: Soviet Union
- Language: Silent film (Russian intertitles)

Девушка с коробкой

The Girl with a Hatbox or Moscow That Laughs and Weeps (Russian: Девушка с коробкой, romanized: Devushka s korobkoy) is a 1927 Soviet silent romantic comedy-drama film directed by Boris Barnet and starring Anna Sten, Vladimir Mikhailov and Vladimir Fogel. The picture was commissioned by the People's Commissariat (Narkomfin) to promote government bonds. It was a success with the audiences and the critics alike.

== Plot ==
Natasha and her grandfather live in a cottage near Moscow, making hats for Madame Irène. Madame and her husband have told the housing committee that Natasha rents a room from them; this fiddle gives Madame's lazy husband a room for lounging. The local railroad clerk, Fogelev, loves Natasha but she takes a shine to Ilya, a clumsy student who sleeps in the train station. To help Ilya, Natasha marries him and takes him to Madame's to live in the room the house committee thinks is hers. Meanwhile, Madame's husband pays Natasha with a lottery ticket he thinks is a loser, and when it comes up big, just as Ilya and Natasha are falling in love, everything gets complicated...

== Cast ==
- Anna Sten as Natasha
- Vladimir Mikhailov as her grandfather
- Vladimir Fogel as Fogelev
- Ivan Koval-Samborsky as Ilya Snegiryov
- Serafima Birman as Madame Irène
- Pavel Pol as Irène's Husband
- Eva Milyutina as Marfusha

== Reception ==
In a 2008 survey Seans magazine, film critic Andrey Shemyakin listed it third among his 10 favourite Russian films.

== See also ==
- The Three Million Trial
- The House on Trubnaya
