= The Plan for Great Works =

1930 film

- Directed by: Abram Room
- Written by: Vladimir Legoshin; Abram Room
- Production company: Soyuzkino
- Release date: 3 March 1930
- Country: Soviet Union
- Languages: Silent; Russian intertitles

The Plan for Great Works (Russian: План великих работ, romanized: Plan velikikh rabot) is a 1930 Soviet documentary film directed by Abram Room and widely regarded as the first Soviet sound film. The film's soundtrack was composed by Arseny Avraamov, who also acted as sound designer and sound editor.

== Bibliography ==
- Christie, Ian & Taylor, Richard. The Film Factory: Russian and Soviet Cinema in Documents 1896-1939. Routledge, 2012.
