= Eduard Tisse =

Soviet cinematographer

- Born: 13 April 1897; Liepāja, Russian Empire
- Died: 18 November 1961 (aged 64); Moscow, Soviet Union
- Occupation: Cinematographer

Eduard Kazimirovich Tisse (Russian: Эдуа́рд Казими́рович Тиссэ́; Latvian: Eduards Tisē; 13 April 1897 – 18 November 1961) was a Soviet cinematographer. He was a laureate of three Stalin Prizes, first degree (1946, 1949, 1950).

== Early life and career ==
He was born to an Estonian Swedish father and Russian mother in Liepāja, where he grew up and studied both painting and photography.

Tisse started his career as a newsreel cameraman working under difficult conditions.

From 1916 to 1918, he worked as a military cameraman. In 1921, Tisse became a professor at Gerasimov Institute of Cinematography. His career did not take off until he worked with director Sergei Eisenstein on the film Strike. Tisse would become Eisenstein's standard cinematographer for the next twenty years.

Tisse, along with Eisenstein and Grigori Alexandrov went on a trip in 1929. They traveled to Europe and the United States with the intent of finding new sound equipment and creating connections between Hollywood and the Soviet film industry. Eisenstein signed with Paramount Pictures and trio headed to California. They worked on several pictures, but nothing was actually produced. Through Eisenstein, photojournalist Margaret Bourke-White met Tisse and in 1932, Tisse collaborated with her on Eyes on Russia (1933); this would be Bourke-White's only attempt at film making.

In 1942, Tisse worked on the film In The Mountains of Yugoslavia with Soviet filmmaker Abram Room. The film focused on the character Slavko Babic, his life and death, as well as the Yugoslav Partisan liberation during World War II. The film proved to be very influential for future Yugoslav filmmakers.

== Selected filmography ==
- Strike (1924); directed by Sergei Eisenstein
- The Battleship Potemkin (1925); directed by Sergei Eisenstein
- October: Ten Days That Shook the World (1928); directed by Sergei Eisenstein
- Aerograd (1935); directed by Alexander Dovzhenko
- ¡Que viva México! (1937); directed by Sergei Eisenstein
- Alexander Nevsky (1938); directed by Sergei Eisenstein
- Ivan the Terrible (1944–46); directed by Sergei Eisenstein
- The Immortal Garrison; 1956
