= Abram Room =

Soviet film director (1894–1976)

Abram Matveyevich Room (Russian: Абрам Матвеевич Роом; real name Abram Mordkhelevich Rom, Russian: Абрам Мордхелевич Ром; 28 June 1894, Vilna – 26 July 1976, Moscow) was a Soviet film director and screenwriter.

== Biography ==
In 1914-1917 he studied at the St. Petersburg Bekhterev Psychoneurological Research Institute, between 1917 and 1922 at the medical faculty of Saratov State University. From 1917 he worked in Saratov in the arts department as professor and rector of the Higher theatrical art workshops. Since 1923 he was the director of Vsevolod Meyerhold’s Theatre of the Revolution in Moscow, director and teacher of the Higher Pedagogical School of the All-Russian Central Executive Committee in the Kremlin. Since 1924 he was the director at the studios Goskino, Sovkino, Soyuzkino. Since 1936 he was director at the studio Mosfilm. In 1925-1934 he taught at VGIK as a senior lecturer.

Room's best known film is Bed and Sofa (1927) after a screenplay by Lev Kuleshov and Viktor Shklovsky. In the film, a woman who is married to a construction worker has an affair with their lodger. The film tracks the evolution of a housewife into a strong liberated woman, which was very unusual for its time. Another notable title is The Ghost That Never Returns (1929)

The first movie he directed was The Vodka Chase in 1924.

He directed the first talking picture in the Soviet Union, the 1930 documentary The Plan for Great Works. The other films he directed were Traitor (1926), Ruts (1928), Criminals (1933), Squadron No. 5 (1939), Invasion (1945), In the Mountains of Yugoslavia (1946), School for Scandal (1952), The Garnet Bracelet (1964), Late Flowers (1969), and A Man Before His Time (1971).

Cited in the German book Texte zur Theorie des Films (Albersmeier 1998, p.304) [texts about theory of film]: "A. Room, declared opponent of the concept of Sergei Eisenstein, postulated in his essay Moi kinoubezhdeniya (My beliefs of film) in: Soviet screen, 1926, m. 8, p. 5: Prior importance in film must be the living human... [in german: Vorrangige Bedeutung kommt im Film dem lebendigen Menschen zu...], exactly that what Eisenstein declined."

== Filmography ==
- The Bay of Death (1926)
- The Wind (1926; screenwriter)
- Bed and Sofa (1927)
- Jews on Land (1927)
- Potholes (1928)
- The Ghost That Never Returns (1930)
- The Plan for Great Works (1930)
- A Severe Young Man (1936)
- Squadron No. 5 (1939)
- In the Mountains of Yugoslavia (1946)
- The Court of Honor (1948)
- Silvery Dust (1953)
- The Garnet Bracelet (1964)
- Late Flowers (1970)
- A Man Before His Time (1971)
