= My Uncle Benjamin =

My Uncle Benjamin (French: Mon oncle Benjamin) may refer to:

- My Uncle Benjamin (novel), an 1843 novel by Claude Tillier
- My Uncle Benjamin (1924 film), a silent French film
- My Uncle Benjamin (1969 film), a French-Italian film
- Mon oncle Benjamin, a 1942 comic opera by Francis Bousquet
