= Erosi Manjgaladze =

Georgian theatre and film actor (1925–1983)

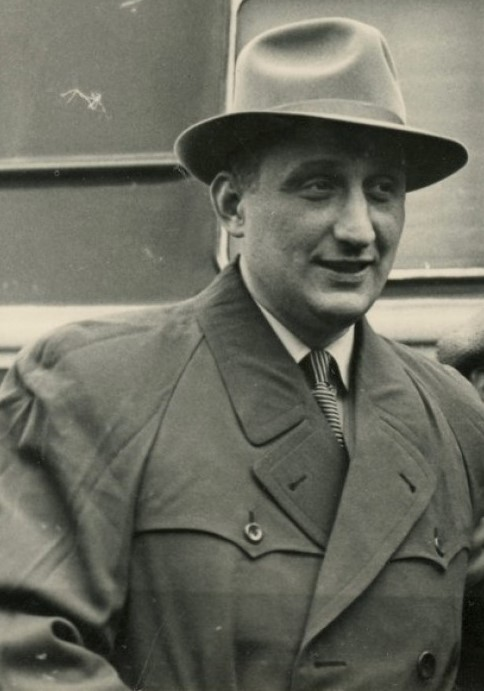
- Erosi Manjgaladze in Tbilisi, 1946.
- Born: 3 March 1925; Ganiri, Samtredia Municipality, Georgian SSR, Soviet Union
- Died: 26 January 1982 (aged 56); Tbilisi, Georgian SSR, Soviet Union
- Occupations: Actor, sports commentator

Erosi Manjgaladze (Georgian: ეროსი მანჯგალაძე; March 3, 1925 – January 26, 1982) was a Soviet and Georgian stage and film actor who played lead roles in some of the most popular Soviet films, such as The Wishing Tree, Melodies of Vera Quarter, Londre, Kvevri and A Necklace for My Beloved. Manjgaladze was also a popular sport commentator of football matches. For his contribution to cinematography and performing arts Manjgaladze received the title of People's Artist of the Georgian SSR.

== Biography ==
Manjgaladze was born in Ganiri in Samtredia Municipality. In 1945, while studying at the Theatre and Film Academy, the theater director Georgy Tovstonogov invited Manjgaladze to Griboedov Theater to play the role of Pripitkin in Maxim Gorky's Barbarians. His talent was quickly recognized by the famous Rustaveli Theatre where he was invited to join its theatrical troupe of well known acting stars like Akaki Khorava, Ramaz Chkhikvadze, and Medea Chakhava. The production of Gabriel Sundukian's well-known play Pepo where Manjgaladze played the role of cunning trader Arutin Kirakozovich Zimzimov in the duet with actress Medea Chakhava (who played the role of Shushan) would become one of the most celebrated theatrical performances of the time and earn him the recognition of an exceptional actor. Manjgaladze's notable theatrical roles included King Oedipus, Khanuma (Count Vano Pantiashvili), and in the Caucasian Chalk Circle (Azdav). He also performed in famous theater houses of Marjanishvili and Tumanishvili theaters working with legendary directors such as Mikheil Tumanishvili.

Manjgaladze possessed one of the best-known voices in theater, a gripping tone of basso profondo which lend him to voice-over roles, voice acting in numerous films and career as the sports commentator of live football matches. His radio broadcasts of news reports from the frontlines during the WWII has earned him the nom de guerre of "Georgian Levitan". His majestic voice in combination with emotional and energetic real time commentary of football matches made him as an iconic sports commentator in the Soviet Union. According to the renowned Georgian actress Medea Chakhava:

"He had a magical voice, a soft velvet tone with low pitch. He didn't talk but murmured gently. It felt as if music has poured from his vocal cords."

In film and theater Manjgaladze was known for his unique way of improvisation and impromptu inventing new lines during the live performances on the stage. His role as police chief Samchkuashvili in 1970 satirical comedy Kvevri became one of the most loved films in Georgia. His extraordinary performance as Bumbula in 1976 film The Wishing Tree received high praise among the film critics. He died from a sudden heart attack in his Tbilisi apartment, aged 56.

== Filmography ==
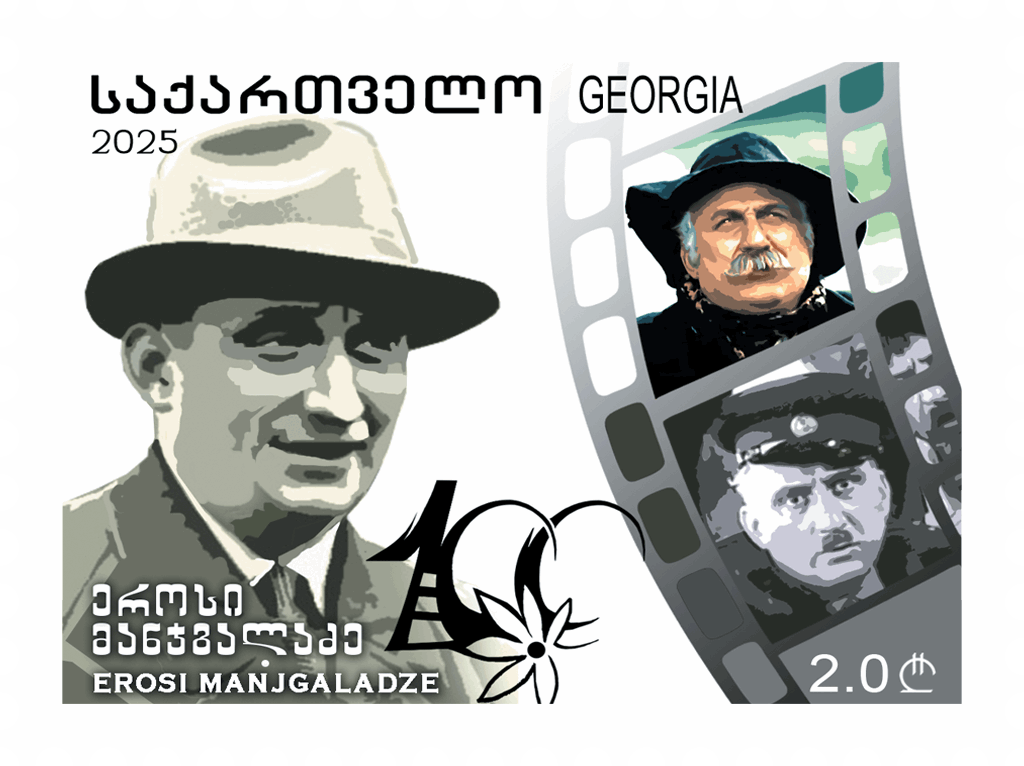
Manjgaladze on a 2025 stamp of Georgia

- 1978 Kojris tkis sizmrebi (Short) (voice, as Erosi Mandjgaladze)
- 1978 Kvarkvare
- 1978 Small Town of Anara
- 1976 The Wishing Tree
- 1976 Namdvili tbiliselebi da skhvebi (voice)
- 1976 Termometri (Short)
- 1975 Kibe (Short)
- 1974 Gamis viziti (TV Movie)
- 1973 Me da chemi mezoblebi (TV Movie)
- 1973 Melodies of the Vera Quarter
- 1972 Stealing the Moon
- 1971 A Necklace for My Beloved
- 1970 Kvevri (Short)
- 1969 Didedebi da shvilishvilebi
- 1967 Chemi megobari Nodari
- 1967 Vigatsas avtobusze agviandeba
- 1966 Londre
- 1966 Meeting with the past
- 1965 Bodishi, tkven gelit sikvdili
- 1963 Tojinebi itsinian
- 1961 Chiakokona
- 1960 Mkhiaruli sastumro (TV Movie)
- 1959 Tsarsuli zapkhuli
- 1957 Mozart da Salieri (TV Movie)

== Theater roles ==
- Vladimer Sokolov, "Great Ruler" (Ivan the Great)
- Gabriel Sundukian, "Pepo" (Zimzimov)
- John Fletcher and Philip Mesinger, Spanish POriest (Lopez)
- Polikarpe Kakabadze, "Khvarkhvare" (Khvarkhvare)
- Leo Kiacheli, "Gvadi Bigva" (Gvadi)
- Sophocles, "King Oedipus" (King Oedipus)
- Giorgi Nakhutsrishvili "Chinchraka" (Bear)
- Avksenti Tsagareli, "Khanuma" (Count Vano Pantiashvili)
- Bertolt Brecht, "The Caucasian Chalk Circle" (Azdav)
- Julius Fuchik, "People, be Vigilant!" (Peshek)
- Viktor Rozov "Before Dinner" (Aleksandre)
- Alexander Isaakovich Gelman, "We, the undersigned" (Yuri Deviatov)

== See also ==
- Marjanishvili Theatre
- Cinema of Georgia
