= Photography (disambiguation) =

Photography is the art and science of creating photographic images.

Photography and Photographic may also refer to:

- Photography (film), a 1973 Hungarian film
- "Photographic", a song by Depeche Mode on their album Speak & Spell

== See also ==
- Fotografia (disambiguation)
