= Jean Peyrière =

French actor

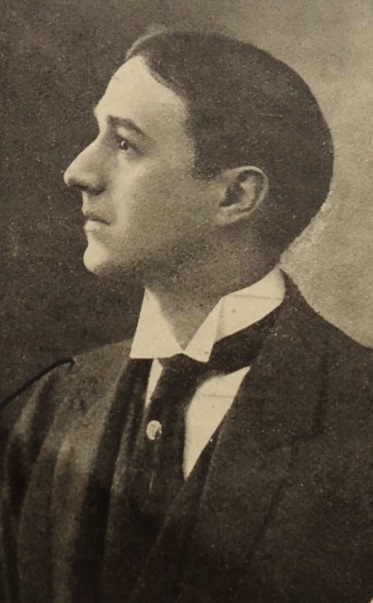
- Born: Marie Henri Georges Jean Vaysse; 2 October 1885; Vesoul, Haute-Saône, French Third Republic
- Died: 7 September 1965 (aged 79); Paris, France
- Occupation: Actor
- Years active: 1910–1937

Jean Peyrière (born Marie Henri Georges Jean Vaysse, 10 October 1885 – 7 September 1965) was a French stage and film actor. He appeared in several popular serial films during his career.

== Biography ==
Jean Peyrière was born Marie Henri Georges Jean Vaysse in Vesoul, Haute-Saône, Franche-Comté. He began his career in the film industry in 1913, with an appearance in the Henri Pouctal directed short film Denise opposite actor Philippe Garnier. Following his role in Denise, he would appear in the André Calmettes directed two part serial Les trois mousquetaires (The Three Muskateers), released the following year. Les trois mousquetaires was an early film adaptation of the 1884 Alexandre Dumas novel of the same name.

Peyrière would spend the remainder of the 1910s appearing in films directed by Louis Mercanton, René Hervil, Jean Kemm and René Plaissetty. In 1919, he appeared in the Henri Pouctal directed serial Travail, which ran in seven installments. In 1923 he appeared in the popular Henri Fescourt directed serial Mandrin, starring Romuald Joubé and followed with a role in the Charles Maudru directed serial Le roi de Paris, starring Jean Dax. Other film serials of the 1920s Peyrière appeared in include Surcouf (1924), directed by Luitz-Morat and starring Jean Angelo; Le Vert Galant (1924), directed by René Leprince; Fanfan la Tulipe (1925), directed again by René Leprince and starring Aimé Simon-Girard; and Le juif errant (1926), directed by Luitz-Morat and starring Gabriel Gabrio.

Jean Peyrière's last film of the 1920s silent film era was the 1929 René Barberis and René Leprince directed drama La tentation (Temptation), starring Lucien Dalsace. Peyrière would only make one sound film, which would also be his last appearance on screen, in the Robert Péguy directed 1937 comedy Monsieur Breloque a disparu, starring Lucien Baroux and Junie Astor.

Following his retirement from the film industry Jean Peyrière settled in Paris where he died in 1965 at age 79.

== Filmography ==
Year	Title	Role	Notes
1913	Denise		
1913	Les trois mousquetaires	Duc de Buckinham	
1915	Sadounah		
1916	L'énigme du château		
1917	Midinettes	Xavier de La Herpinière	
1919	Le destin est maître		
1920	Au travail	Boisgelin	
1920	Fille du peuple	François Barjac	
1920	Le Lys du Mont Saint-Michel		
1923	Le roi de Paris (The King of Paris)	Jean Hiénard	
1924	Mandrin		
1924	Les amours de Rocambole (The Loves of Rocambole)		
1924	Le vert galant	Sully	
1924	The Loves of Rocambole	Le duc de Sallendrera	
1925	Surcouf	William Pitt	
1925	Fanfan la Tulipe	M. Favart	
1926	Titi premier, roi des gosses	Coquebot	
1926	Le Juif errant	Le Christ et Rennepont	Serial
1928	Princess Masha	Kerdiakoff	
1929	La tention (Temptation)	Maurice Brinon	
1938	Monsieur Breloque Has Disappeared		(final film role)
