= Father of a Soldier =

- Directed by: Rezo Chkheidze
- Written by: Suliko Jgenti
- Produced by: Shota Laperadze
- Starring: Sergo Zaqariadze; Vladimir Privaltsev; Aleksandr Nazarov; Aleksandr Lebedev; Yuri Drozdov
- Narrated by: Armen Dzhigarkhanyan
- Cinematography: Lev Sukhov; Archil Pilipashvili
- Edited by: Vasily Dolenko
- Music by: Sulkhan Tsintsadze
- Production company: Kartuli Pilmi
- Release date: 1964
- Running time: 83 minutes
- Country: Soviet Union
- Languages: Georgian, Russian

Father of a Soldier (Georgian: ჯარისკაცის მამა translit. jariskats'is mama, Russian: Отец солдата, romanized: Otets soldata) is a 1964 Georgian-Russian black-and-white World War II-themed drama film directed by Revaz Chkheidze based on a script by Suliko Jgenti. The leading role was played by Sergo Zakariadze. The film was entered into the 4th Moscow International Film Festival.

== Plot ==
Summer of 1942. The elderly Georgian farmer Giorgi Makharashvili learns that his son, Goderdzi, is wounded and was taken to a hospital. Giorgi is setting forth to visit his son. While he was getting there, the son had recovered and sent off to the front.

Giorgi decides to stay in the army and successfully gets enlisted to the motorized units. Together with his comrades in arms, he goes to Germany. He finds his son's tank brigade was the first to cross the river. There is a fight in a building between the Soviets on ground level, and Germans on the second level, as the Soviets try to liberate the blockaded soldiers on the third level.

Giorgi hears his son, and tries to save him. Goderdzi is fatally wounded, and is held by his father. The film ends with Giorgi and his comrades crossing the bridge, inscribed in paint "Here, first crossed the tanks of Hero of the Soviet Union Senior Lieutenant Makharashvilli"

== Cast ==
- Sergo Zaqariadze as Giorgi Makharashvili
- Vladimir Privaltsev as Nikiforov
- Aleksandr Nazarov as Arkadi
- Aleksandr Lebedev as Nikolay Nazarov
- Yuri Drozdov as Vova
- Vladimir Kolokoltsev as Grisha
- Viktor Uralsky as Pasha
- Qetevan Bochorishvili as Tamari, Giorgi's wife
- Vladimir Pitsek as hospital registrar
- Pyotr Lyubeshkin as general
- Ivan Kosykh as Akhmed
- Viktor Kosykh as Vasya
- Roman Vildan as musician
- Yura Drozdov as Borya
- Yelena Maksimova as Borya's granny
- Inna Vykhodtseva as Vasya's mother
- Nikolai Barmin as colonel
- Radner Muratov as lieutenant
- Bondo Goginava as Giorgi Makharashvili's fellow villager
- Ketevan Bochorishvili as Maria
- Gia Kobakhidze as Goderdzi Makharashvili
