= Shota Laperadze =

Georgian film director (1929–1995)

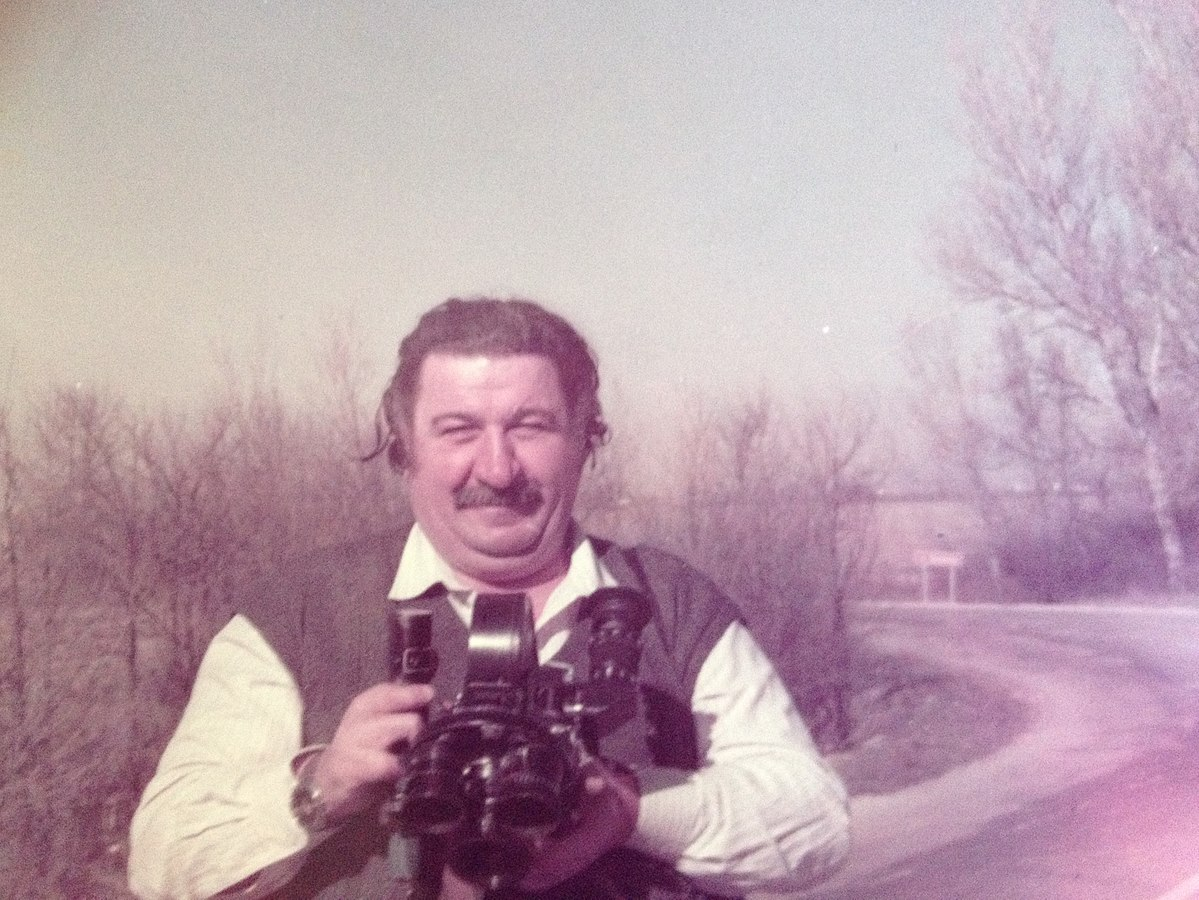
- Born: 28 February 1929
- Died: 11 March 1995 (aged 66)
- Burial place: Saburtalo Cemetery
- Education: Tbilisi State University
- Years active: 1959–1995
- Organization: Georgian Film Studio
- Parents: Grigol Laperadze (father); Tatiana Nishnianidze (mother)

Shota Laperadze (28 February 1929 – 11 March 1995) was a Georgian film producer who produced twenty films between 1959 and 1995. From 1959 to 1991 he worked as a film producer at Georgian Film Studio. From 1991 to 1995, Laperadze was a head of the film unions - “Aisi” and “Caucasus.” He was a member of the Film-makers' Union of Georgia from 1978 until his death.

In 1974 Laperadze received an award as a best film producer for the film Mze Shemodgomisa (Autumn Sun). Laperadze often worked with Georgian film director Rezo Chkheidze; together they made eight films, including Father of a Soldier (1964), which was entered into the 4th Moscow International Film Festival and The Saplings (1972) that was entered into the 8th Moscow International Film Festival where it won a Diploma.

Laperadze also worked with other film directors such as Otar Iosseliani, Georgiy Shengelaya and Temur Babluani. In 1975 Laperadze produced Otar Iosseliani`s film Pastorale, the film received an award on Berlin International Film Festival in 1982.

== Filmography ==
- Seashore Path (1962)
- Father of a Soldier (1964)
- Matsi Khvitia (1966)
- Look at These Young People (1969)
- Peola (1970)
- The Star of My City (1970)
- The Saplings (1972)
- Autumn Sun (1973)
- Flowering Acacia (1974)
- Errantry (1975)
- Pastorale (1975)
- The Wager (1975)
- Bakula's Pigs (1976)
- Return (1977)
- My Friend, Uncle Vania (1978)
- Earth, This Is Your Son (1980)
- Brother (1981)
- The Life of Don Quixote and Sancho (1989) (TV Mini-Series)
- The Fallen Angel (1992)
