= Katarzyna Werner =

Polish journalist and television presenter

- Born: 23 November 1976 (age 49); Poznań, Poland
- Education: Adam Mickiewicz University
- Occupation: Journalist
- Years active: 1999 – present
- Notable credit(s): You Get Up and You Know; Poland and The World

Katarzyna Werner (born 23 November 1976) is a Polish journalist and television presenter. She presented the news on TVN24 morning show You Get Up and You Know and also sometimes served as guest host of the whole show.

== Biography ==
Werner studied politology on Adam Mickiewicz University in Poznań. From 1999 to 2008 she worked in TVP Poznań, where she served as reporter of Telescope. In 2002 she appeared on a television series Lokatorzy. From 2004 to 2008 she presented morning, noon and afternoon editions of TVP1 newscast Wiadomości. Since 6 November 2008 she worked for TVN24, where she presented the news on morning show You Get Up and You Know and sometimes served as guest host of the whole show. She lectured journalism at Adam Mickiewicz University in Poznań. After her television career she moved to Zanzibar.
