= Fanfan la Tulipe (1925 film) =

1925 film

- Directed by: René Leprince
- Written by: Pierre-Gilles Veber
- Screenplay by: Pierre-Gilles Veber
- Produced by: Louis Nalpas
- Starring: Aimé Simon-Girard; Simone Vaudry; Jacques Guilhène
- Cinematography: René Gaveau; Julien Ringel
- Production company: Société des Cinéromans
- Distributed by: Pathé Consortium Cinéma
- Release date: 23 October 1925 (France)
- Running time: 361 minutes
- Country: France
- Language: French

Fanfan la Tulipe is a 1925 French swashbuckler film directed by René Leprince based on a screenplay by Pierre-Gilles Veber and starring Aimé Simon-Girard, Simone Vaudry, and Jacques Guilhène.

== Cast ==
- Aimé Simon-Girard as Fanfan la Tulipe
- Simone Vaudry as Perrette
- Jacques Guilhène as Louis XV
- Claude France as Mme de Pompadour
- Pierre de Guingand as Marquis d'Aurilly
- Renée Héribel as Mme Favart
- Paul Guidé as Chevalier de Lurbeck
- Alexandre Colas as Le maréchal de Saxe
- Jean Peyrière as M. Favart
- Paul Cervières as Fier-à-Bras
- Jean Demerçay as Duc de Cumberland
- Mario Nasthasio as Marquis d'Argenson

== Bibliography ==
- Dayna Oscherwitz & MaryEllen Higgins. The A to Z of French Cinema. Scarecrow Press, 2009.
