= List of submissions to the 46th Academy Awards for Best Foreign Language Film =

1973 Best Foreign Language Film submissions

Highlights
- Oscar winner: (France) Day for Night
- Submissions: 21
- Debuts: 2

In 1973 the list of submissions to the 46th Academy Awards for Best Foreign Language Film included twenty films.

The Academy Award for Best Foreign Language Film was created in 1956 by the Academy of Motion Picture Arts and Sciences to honour non-English-speaking films produced outside the United States. The award is handed out annually, and is accepted by the winning film's director, although it is considered an award for the submitting country as a whole. Countries are invited by the academy to submit their best films for competition according to strict rules, with only one film being accepted from each country.

For the 46th Academy Awards, twenty films were submitted in the category Academy Award for Best Foreign Language Film. East Germany and Finland made their debuts in the competition. The five nominated films came from France, West Germany, Israel, Netherlands and Switzerland.

France won for the ninth time for Day for Night by François Truffaut, which was also nominated for Best Director, Best Original Screenplay and Best Supporting Actress (Valentina Cortese) in the subsequent ceremony (47th Academy Awards).

== Submissions ==
Submitting country	Film title used in nomination	Original title	Language(s)	Director(s)	Result
Brazil	João and the Knife	A Faca e o Rio	Brazilian Portuguese	George Sluizer	Not nominated
Czechoslovakia	Days of Betrayal	Dny zrady	Czech	Otakar Vávra	Not nominated
Egypt	Empire M	إمبراطورية ميم	Arabic	Hussein Kamal	Not nominated
Finland	The Earth Is a Sinful Song	Maa on syntinen laulu	Finnish	Rauni Mollberg	Not nominated
France	Day for Night	La Nuit américaine	French	François Truffaut	Won Academy Award
East Germany	Her Third	Der Dritte	German	Egon Günther	Not nominated
West Germany	The Pedestrian	Der Fußgänger	German	Maximilian Schell	Nominated
Hungary	Photography	Fotográfia	Hungarian	Pál Zolnay	Not nominated
India	Saudagar	सौदागर	Hindi	Sudhendu Roy	Not nominated
Israel	The House on Chelouche Street	בית ברחוב שלוש	Hebrew, Egyptian Arabic, Ladino	Moshé Mizrahi	Nominated
Japan	Coup d'État	戒厳令	Japanese	Yoshishige Yoshida	Not nominated
Mexico	Reed: Insurgent Mexico	Reed, México insurgente	Spanish	Paul Leduc	Not nominated
Netherlands	Turkish Delight	Turks fruit	Dutch	Paul Verhoeven	Nominated
Poland	Copernicus	Kopernik	Polish	Ewa Petelska and Czesław Petelski	Not nominated
Romania	Veronica		Romanian	Elisabeta Bostan	Not nominated
Soviet Union	Liberation	Освобождение	Russian, German, English, Polish, Italian, French, Serbo-Croatian	Yuri Ozerov	Not nominated
South Korea	Mute Samyong	비련의 벙어리 삼용	Korean	Byun Jang-ho	Not nominated
Spain	Habla, mudita		Spanish	Manuel Gutiérrez Aragón	Not nominated
Sweden	Scenes from a Marriage	Scener ur ett äktenskap	Swedish	Ingmar Bergman	Disqualified
Switzerland	L'Invitation		French	Claude Goretta	Nominated
Yugoslavia	The Battle of Sutjeska	Sutjeska	Serbo-Croatian, English, German	Stipe Delić	Not nominated

== Notes ==
- (Sweden) Scenes from a Marriage sparked controversy when its ineligibility for the Academy Award for Best Foreign Language Film was questioned. The supposed reason was that it aired on television before it played in cinemas, but at the time that did not necessarily render a film ineligible. In this case, it was because the TV broadcast occurred the year before its theatrical debut in 1974. The film's ineligibility prompted 24 filmmakers, including Frank Capra and Federico Fellini, to write an open letter demanding the rules for eligibility be revised.

== Sources ==
- Margaret Herrick Library, Academy of Motion Picture Arts and Sciences
