= My Uncle Benjamin (1924 film) =

1924 film

- Directed by: René Leprince
- Written by: Roger Guillien
- Based on: My Uncle Benjamin by Claude Tillier
- Starring: Léon Mathot; Madeleine Erickson; Charles Lamy
- Cinematography: René Gaveau; Julien Ringel
- Production company: Pathé Consortium Cinéma
- Distributed by: Pathé Consortium Cinéma
- Release date: 11 January 1924
- Country: France
- Languages: Silent; French intertitles

My Uncle Benjamin (French: Mon oncle Benjamin) is a 1924 French silent comedy film directed by René Leprince and starring Léon Mathot, Madeleine Erickson and Charles Lamy. It is based on the 1843 novel My Uncle Benjamin by Claude Tillier, later adapted again into a 1969 film of the same title.

== Cast ==
- Léon Mathot as Benjamin Rathery
- Madeleine Erickson as Manette
- Charles Lamy as Machecourt
- Betty Carter as Madame Machecourt
- Émile Garandet as Le docteur Minxit
- André Clairius as Pont-Cassé
- Madame De Houx as Arabella

== Bibliography ==
- Dayna Oscherwitz & MaryEllen Higgins. The A to Z of French Cinema. Scarecrow Press, 2009.
