= István Iglódi =

Hungarian actor

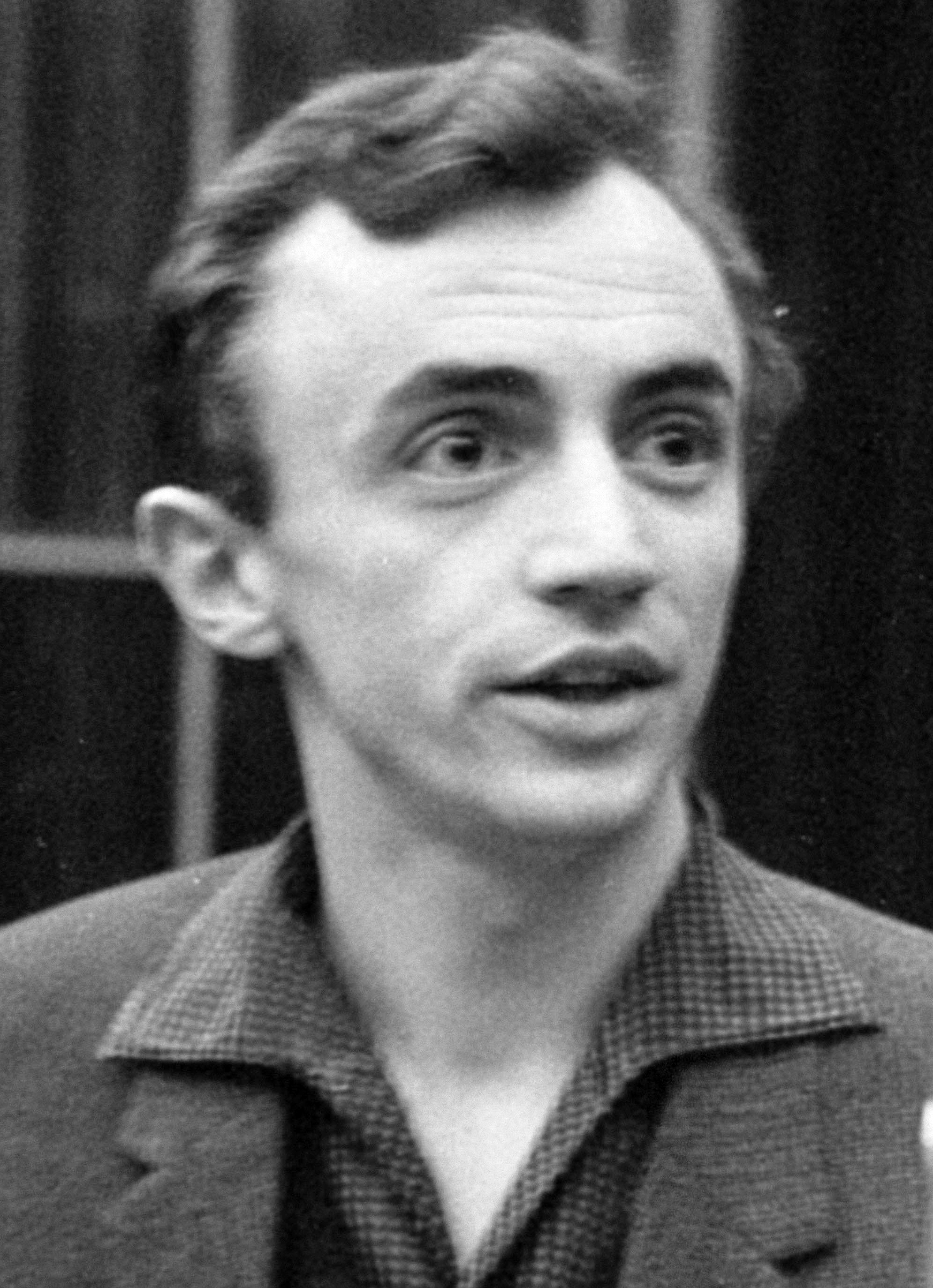
- Born: 29 April 1944; Magyarbóly, Hungary
- Died: 3 December 2009 (aged 65); Budapest, Hungary
- Occupation: Actor
- Years active: 1965-2008

István Iglódi (29 April 1944 – 3 December 2009) was a Hungarian actor and stage director. He appeared in over 65 films and television shows between 1965 and 2008.

== Selected filmography ==
- The Testament of Aga Koppanyi (1967)
- The Upthrown Stone (1969)
- Trotta (1971)
- Husaren in Berlin (1971)
- Photography (1973)
