= The Mask of Horror =

1912 film

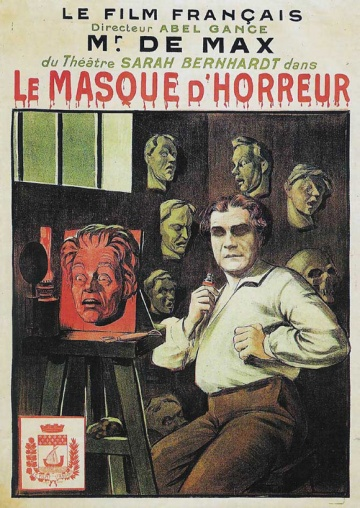
- Film poster
- Directed by: Abel Gance
- Written by: Abel Gance
- Starring: Édouard de Max
- Distributed by: Pathé Frères
- Release date: 24 May 1912
- Country: France
- Languages: Silent; French intertitles

The Mask of Horror (French: Le masque d'horreur) is a 1912 short silent French horror film directed by Abel Gance and starring Édouard de Max.

== Cast ==
- Édouard de Max
- Charles de Rochefort
- Florelle (as Mlle Rousseau)
- Mathilde Thizeau
- Jean Toulout as Ermont
