= Lokatorzy =

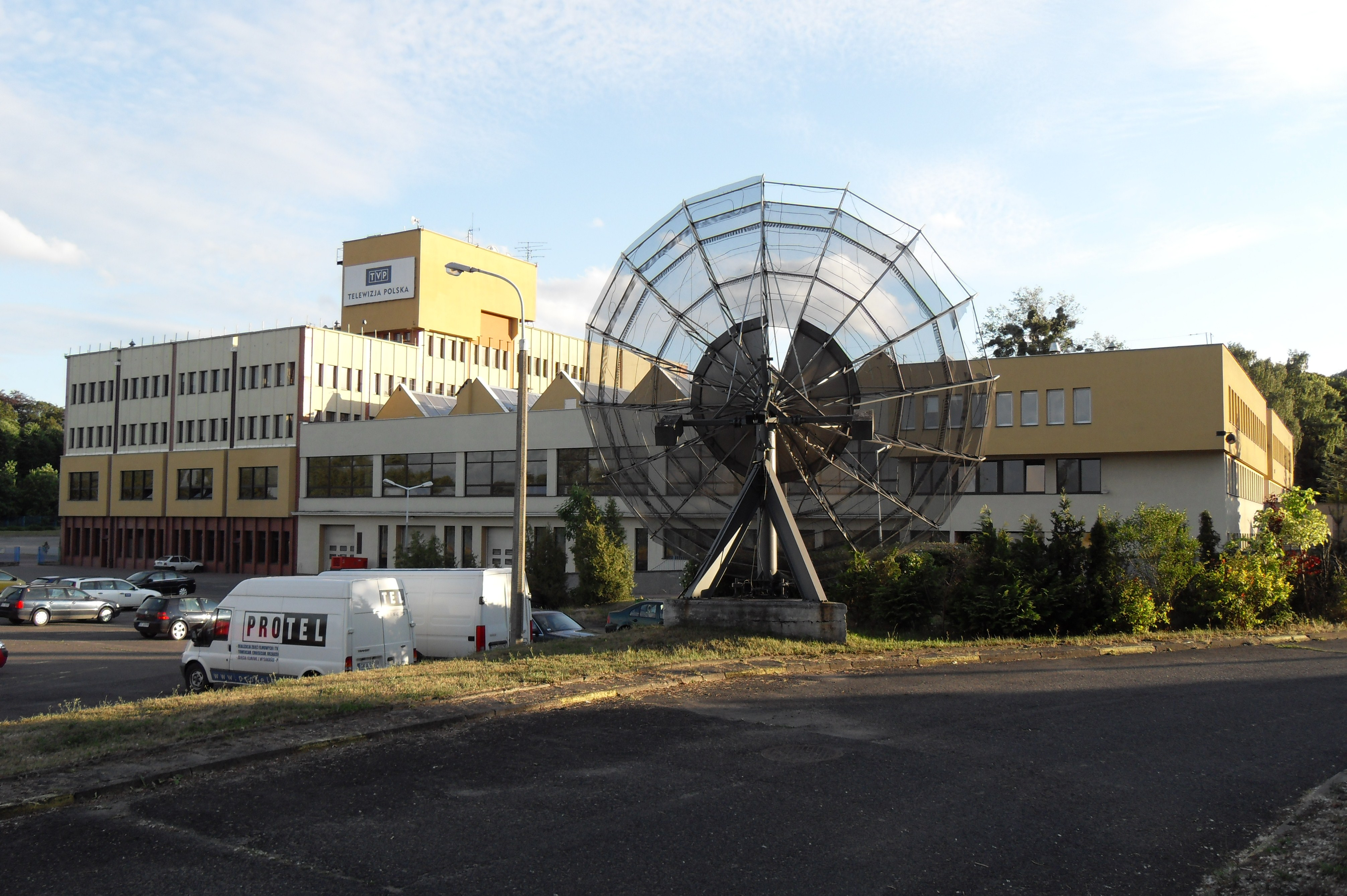
- The TVP3 Gdańsk building, where the series was filmed.
- Genre: Sitcom
- Based on: Three's Company, Man About the House, George and Mildred
- Screenplay by: Zbigniew Kamiński
- Directed by: Marcin Sławiński; Feridun Erol; Andrzej Strzelecki; Andrzej Kostenko; Radosław Piwowarski
- Starring: Ewa Szykulska; Marek Siudym; Olga Borys; Michał Lesień; Agnieszka Michalska; Patrycja Szczepanowska; Andżelika Piechowiak; Andrzej Kopiczyński; Michał Milowicz; Małgorzata Lewińska; Julian Kamecki
- Music by: Wiesław Pieregorólka
- Country of origin: Poland
- Original language: Polish
- No. of seasons: 6
- No. of episodes: 226 (list of episodes)

Production
- Executive producer: Rubicon Films
- Producer: TVP3 Gdańsk
- Production location: Gdańsk
- Camera setup: Multi-camera

Original release
- Network: TVP1
- Release: 6 February 2000 – 16 October 2005

Lokatorzy (lit. The Tenants) is a Polish television sitcom that aired for six seasons on TVP1 from February 6, 2000, to October 16, 2005. It is based on the American sitcom Three's Company and British Man About the House as well as George and Mildred. The series was recorded with a live audience.

The story revolves around three single roommates: Jacek Przypadek, Krysia Drewnowska, and Zuzia Śnieżanka, who all platonically live together in a Warsaw multifamily house owned by Stanisław and Helena Bogacka.

The show had a spin-off Sąsiedzi, based upon George and Mildred, Robin's Nest, and I Love Lucy.

== Synopsis ==
Krysia Drewnowska (Agnieszka Michalska), a florist, and Zuzia Śnieżanka (Olga Borys), a secretary, live in Warsaw. They share a two-bedroom, one-bathroom apartment with their roommate, Elżbieta Iłowiecka (Monika Stefaniak). An going-away party for newlywed Elżbieta is held at the apartment. The next morning, Krysia and Zuzia find Jacek Przypadek (Michał Lesień), a culinary student, sleeping in the bathtub. The women offer Jacek the second bedroom because they need someone to cover Elżbieta's share of the rent. He quickly accepts so that he can have an alternative to the local university dormitory. Jacek is attracted to Zuzia, but the three of them agree to live platonically.

However, the overbearing landlord Stanisław Bogacki (Marek Siudym) refuses to allow unmarried men and women to live together in his house. He allows Jacek to move in only after Krysia tells him that Jacek is homosexual. Stanisław's wife, Helena (Ewa Szykulska), quickly figures out that Jacek is straight. Nevertheless, she trusts him with the girls and promises to keep his secret from Stanisław. Helen's bond with the three roommates grows throughout the series until the couple's departure, which leads into the spin-off, Sąsiedzi.

In 2001, Roman Zagórny (Andrzej Kopiczyński) joins the cast as the roommates' new building manager. In episode 183, Krysia gets married and moves out of the house. Hania Muszyńska (Andżelika Piechowiak), Krysia's first cousin, moves into the apartment. In 2004, Zuzia travels with doctors from her clinic on a mission to Kenya to help treat children. Zuzia is replaced in the apartment by Pola Gabryś (Patrycja Szczepanowska), a nurse who had treated Jacek for a severe cut in the emergency room the day Zuzia moved out.

The series ends with the tenants moving out due to Hania getting married, Pola leaving for London, and Jacek moving in to a different apartment with his girlfriend.

== Cast and characters ==
=== Main ===
- Krystyna "Krysia" Drewnowska (Agnieszka Michalska) – one of the three tenants of the apartment on the first floor of the house, she came from Ostrołęka. She shared a room with Zuzia. She worked in a flower shop. She had a talent for logical thinking and analyzing difficult situations, from which she often rescued Jacek and Zuza. She was able to intelligently get rid of unwanted suitors. Later, she got married and moved out of the house.
- Zuzanna "Zuzia" Śnieżanka (Olga Borys) – a tenant of the apartment on the first floor, she came from Jelenia Góra. At first, she worked as a secretary, and later as a receptionist at a clinic. Not very intelligent, but charming, very sensitive and emotional. Zuzanna's characteristic feature was her loud, unusual laugh ("hry-hry-hry"). She moved out of the apartment because she left for Kenya to help treat small children.
- Jacek Przypadek (Michał Lesień) – a tenant of the apartment on the first floor of the house, originally from Płock. Initially, he was a student at the Gastronomy College on Ząbkowska Street in Warsaw, and after graduating with honors, he became, among other things, the head chef at Mr. Jabłoniec's restaurant. He had a brother, Adam. Jacek easily got into trouble, from which Krysia and Zuzia often helped him get out. He was a womanizer and a joker by nature, but his dates often ended in disaster.
- Franciszek "Franek" Stachyra (Maciej Kowalewski) – Jacek's best friend, a womanizer. He sold used cars. Franek often had financial problems, so he would ask his landlords for loans of money or food. Initially, he lived in a studio apartment, then he moved into the Bogacki family's house and lived in the attic.
- Pola Gabryś (Patrycja Szczepanowska) – a nurse at the clinic where Zuzia used to work. She moved to London.
- Hanna Muszyńska (Andżelika Piechowiak) – Krysia's cousin. She ran a flower shop as her successor. She lived with Jacek and Pola. She married Leszek, a driving instructor.
- Helena Bogacka (Ewa Szykulska) – a middle-aged woman, Stanisław's wife. Unlike her husband, she was tolerant and conciliatory towards the tenants. She loved Stasiu and tried to keep her marriage from falling apart. Later, she moved to the “Akacjowa” housing estate, where she lived next door to her friend Patrycja. She was a kind and warm-hearted person.
- Stanisław "Stasiu" Bogacki (Marek Siudym) – landlord and owner of the house, Helena's husband. A penny pincher, does not attach much importance to appearance and good manners. He has no major ambitions or goals in life. Stasiu seems bored with his marriage and avoids close contact with his wife. He did not have a steady job – his favorite activities at home were watching television and talking to his parrot, Oskar. On the occasion of their 25th wedding anniversary, as a gift to Helena, he sold the house to move with her to the “Akacjowa” housing estate. He did not like his new neighbor, Cezary Cwał-Wiśniewski, but he became friends with his son, Piotruś.
- Roman Zagórny (Andrzej Kopiczyński) – the new host of the house, a former “background artist.” He pretended to be a tough and decent citizen, but he was very coward. He was afraid of the owner of the house, who was also his brother, Adolf.
- Patrycja Cwał-Wiśniewska (Małgorzata Lewińska) – Cezary's wife, Piotr's mother. She was a housewife and a friend of Helena Bogacka. Unlike her husband, she liked the Bogackis.
- Cezary Cwał-Wiśniewski (Michał Milowicz) – Patrycja's husband, Piotr's father. He loved singing. Initially, he worked in real estate sales, then became a star of Cuban music. Owner of the Tropicana club. He did not like his neighbors, the Bogackis, especially Mr. Stanisław, who often got him into trouble.
- Piotr Cwał-Wiśniewski (Julian Kamecki) – son of Patrycja and Cezary.
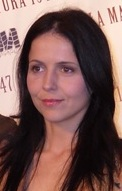
Agnieszka Michalska as Krysia Drewnowska

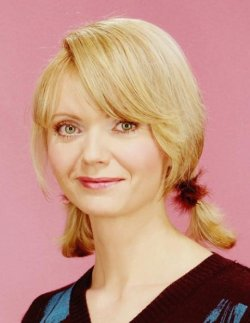
Olga Borys as Zuzia Śnieżanka

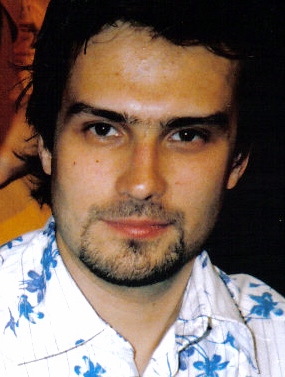
Michał Lesień as Jacek Przypadek

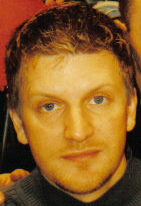
Maciej Kowalewski as Franek Stachyra

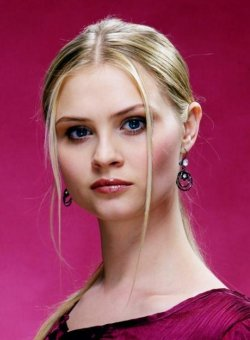
Patrycja Szczepanowska as Pola Gabryś

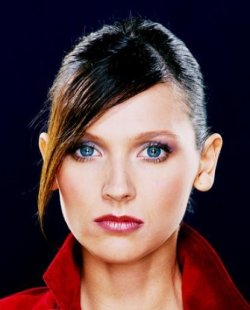
Andżelika Piechowiak as Hania Muszyńska

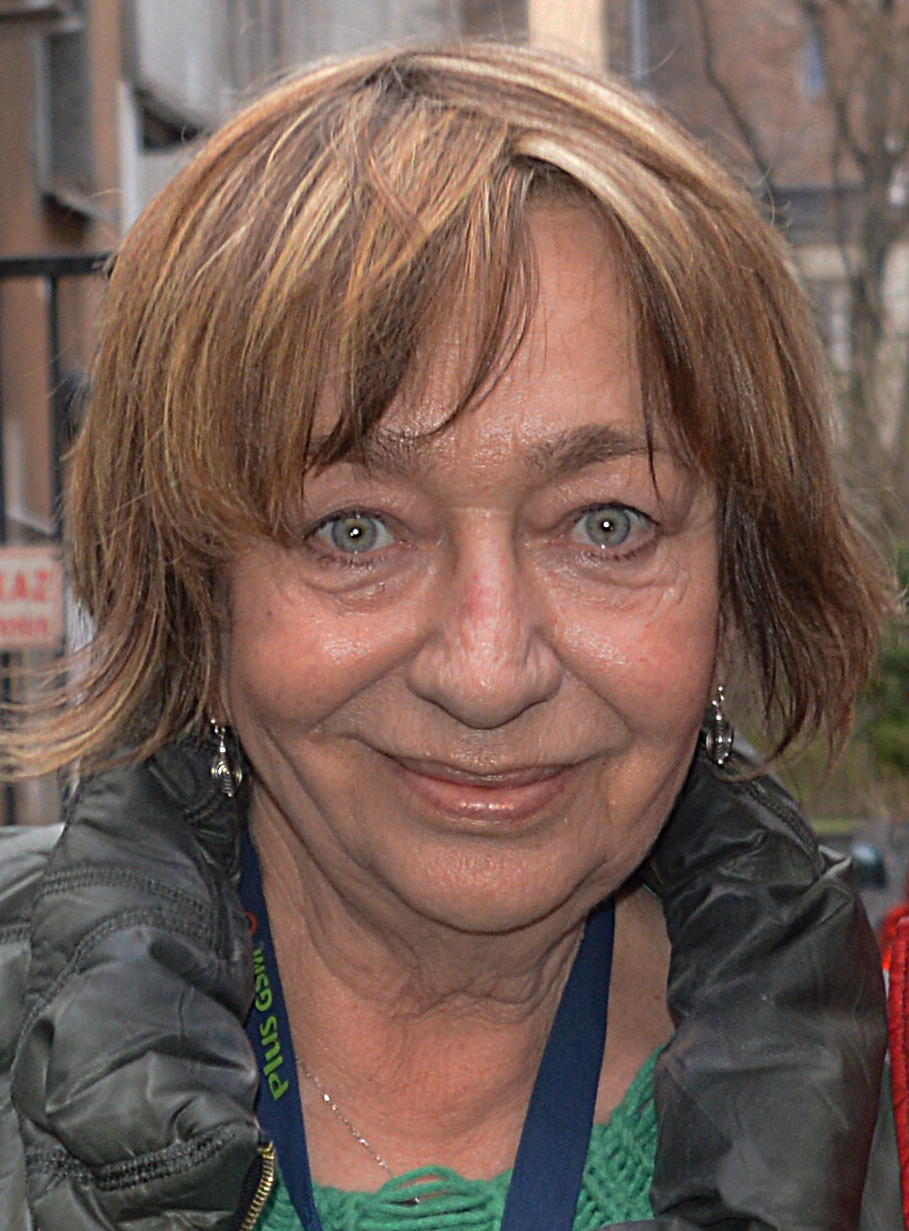
Ewa Szykulska as Helena Bogacka

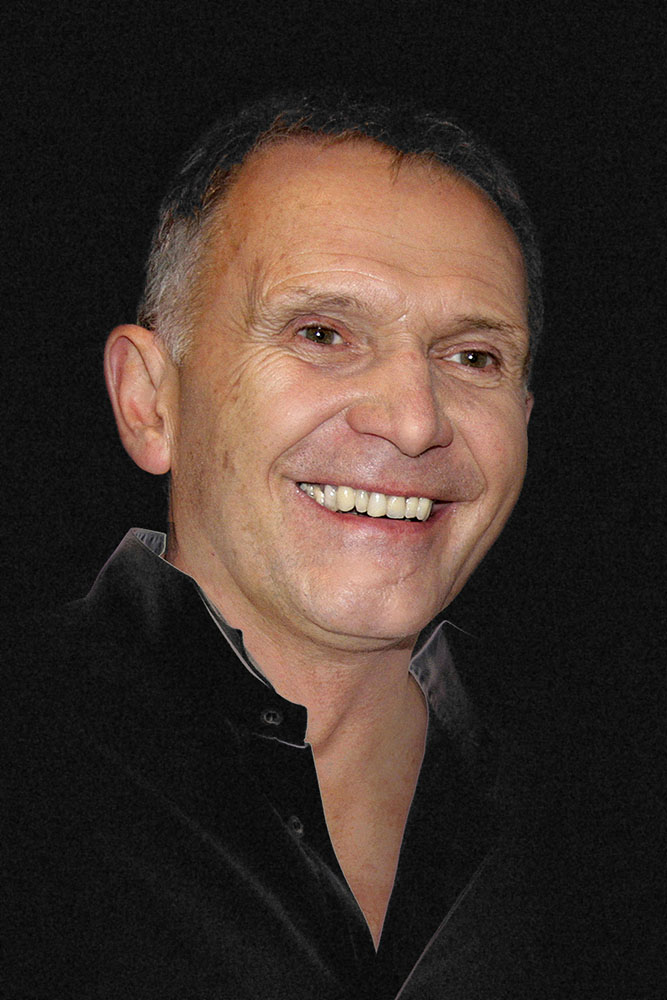
Marek Siudym as Stanisław Bogacki

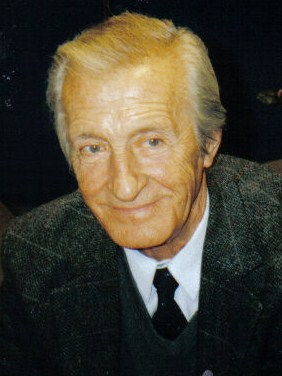
Andrzej Kopiczyński as Roman Zagórny
