= Love and Glory (film) =

1924 silent film

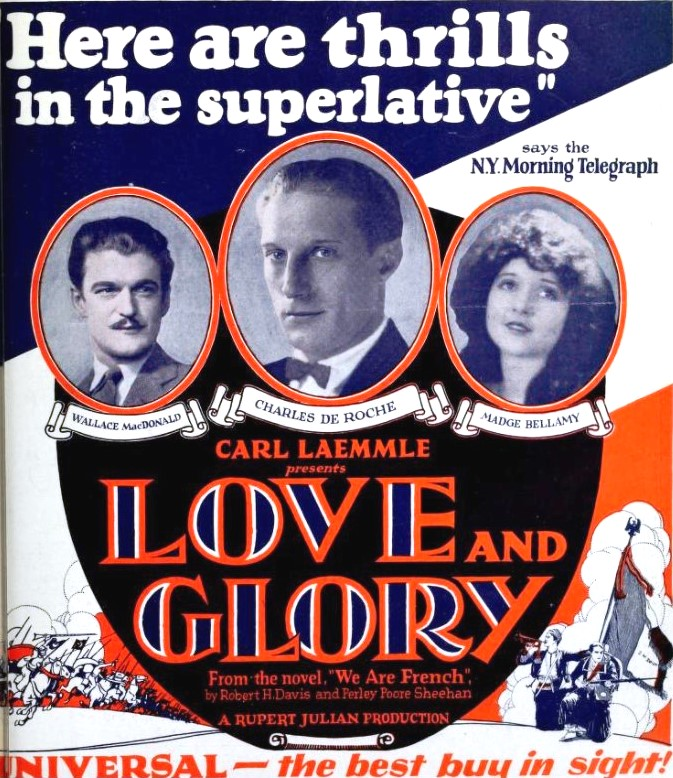
- Advertisement
- Directed by: Rupert Julian
- Written by: Elliott J. Clawson; Rupert Julian
- Based on: We Are French by Perley Poore Sheehan and Robert Hobart Davis
- Produced by: Carl Laemmle
- Starring: Charles de Rochefort; Wallace MacDonald; Madge Bellamy
- Cinematography: Gilbert Warrenton
- Production company: Universal Pictures
- Distributed by: Universal Pictures
- Release date: December 7, 1924
- Running time: 70 minutes
- Country: United States
- Language: Silent (English intertitles)

Love and Glory is a 1924 American silent drama film directed by Rupert Julian and starring Charles de Rochefort, Wallace MacDonald, and Madge Bellamy.

== Plot ==
As described in a film magazine, Anatole Picard and Pierre Dupont are two French volunteers in the Algerian campaign, brother and sweetheart of Gabrielle. Before embarking for Africa, Pierre wins the young woman's promise to await his return. Serving as a bugler in headquarters company, Anatole is captured by the enemy and commanded to blow Retreat. He outwits his captors and blows the Charge, resulting in a French victory. Returning home, they find their native village devastated by the Prussian war of 1870, and the young woman gone. Pierre never tires of narrating his chum's courageous exploit, until he makes himself a laughing-stock. He believes, however, if he tells the story often enough, his crony will eventually receive governmental recognition. Years pass. Finally, the French government, in search of a hero on whom to bestow a decoration, hears of Anatole's exploit and sends for him. Unwilling to desert his chum, and to prove himself as much a soldier as ever, he, accompanied by Pierre, declines the offer of railroad transportation and sets out on foot for the capital. His strength gives out, and he dies en route. Pierre, to perpetuate his friend's memory, changes uniforms with his dead companion, borrows his credentials and, assuming the dead man's identity, continues on to Paris. There he receives Anatole's decoration. The dead man's sister, Gabrielle, finally located by the French government, is there to witness the ceremony, and sees through Pierre's deception. She keeps silent, however, and accompanies him back to the body of her dead brother, upon whose tattered regimentals they reverently pin the long-awaited decoration.

== Cast ==
- Charles de Rochefort as Pierre Dupont
- Wallace MacDonald as Anatole Picard
- Madge Bellamy as Gabrielle
- Ford Sterling as Emile Pompaneau
- Gibson Gowland as Jules Malicorne
- Priscilla Moran as Little Marie
- Charles De Ravenne as The Imp
- Andre Lancy as Dissard
- Madame De Bodamere as The Imp's Mother
- Christian J. Frank as Bit Role (uncredited)
- Rolfe Sedan as Bit Role (uncredited)

== Preservation ==
With no prints of Love and Glory located in any film archives, it is considered a lost film.

== Bibliography ==
- Munden, Kenneth White. The American Film Institute Catalog of Motion Pictures Produced in the United States, Part 1. University of California Press, 1997.
