= La Folie du doute =

1923 silent film by René Leprince

- Directed by: René Leprince
- Written by: René Leprince
- Cinematography: Julien Ringel
- Release date: 1923
- Country: France
- Language: Silent film

La Folie du doute (French for 'The Madness of Doubting' or 'The Doubter's Disease') is a 1923 French silent film written and directed by René Leprince. The film was shot in 1920.

== Plot ==
Jean Willars is an intelligent man but he has a severe psychological affection: he doubts everything, himself included.

== Cast ==
- Yvonne Dupré
- Jean Dax as Jean Willars
- Alexandre Arquillière
- Jean Aymé
- Madame Delaunay
- Christiane Delval
- Ernest Maupain
- Madame Valmont
