= Fotografia =

Fotografia (or similar) may refer to:

- "Fotografia" (Antônio Carlos Jobim song), 1959
- "Fotografia" (Carl Brave song), 2018
- "Fotografia" (Geolier song), 2025
- "Fotografía" (Juanes and Nelly Furtado song), 2002
- Fotográfia (film), 1973 Hungarian film
- "Tu Fotografía", a 2002 song by Gloría Estefan
