= Shadows of Paris (1924 film) =

1924 film by Herbert Brenon

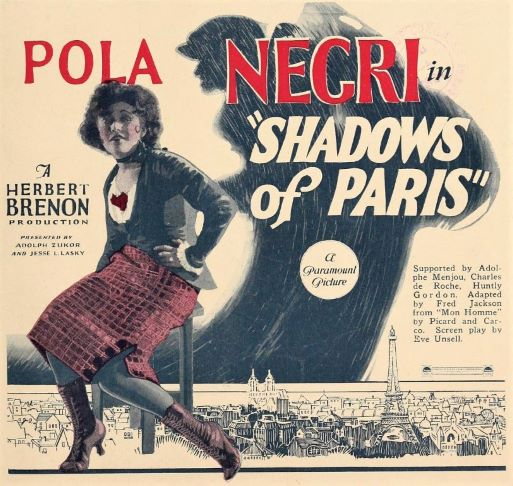
- Advertisement
- Directed by: Herbert Brenon
- Written by: Frederick J. Jackson; Eve Unsell
- Based on: Mon Homme by Francis Carco and André Picard
- Starring: Pola Negri; Charles de Rochefort; Huntley Gordon; Adolphe Menjou
- Cinematography: Bert Baldridge
- Production company: Paramount Pictures
- Distributed by: Paramount Pictures (US); Sascha-Film (Austria)
- Release date: February 17, 1924
- Running time: 70 minutes
- Country: United States
- Language: Silent (English intertitles)

Shadows of Paris is a lost 1924 American silent drama film directed by Herbert Brenon and starring Pola Negri, Charles de Rochefort, and Huntley Gordon. The screenplay involves a young woman who rises from an apache dancer to become a wealthy woman in post-World War I Paris. It was based on the play Mon Homme by Francis Carco and André Picard.

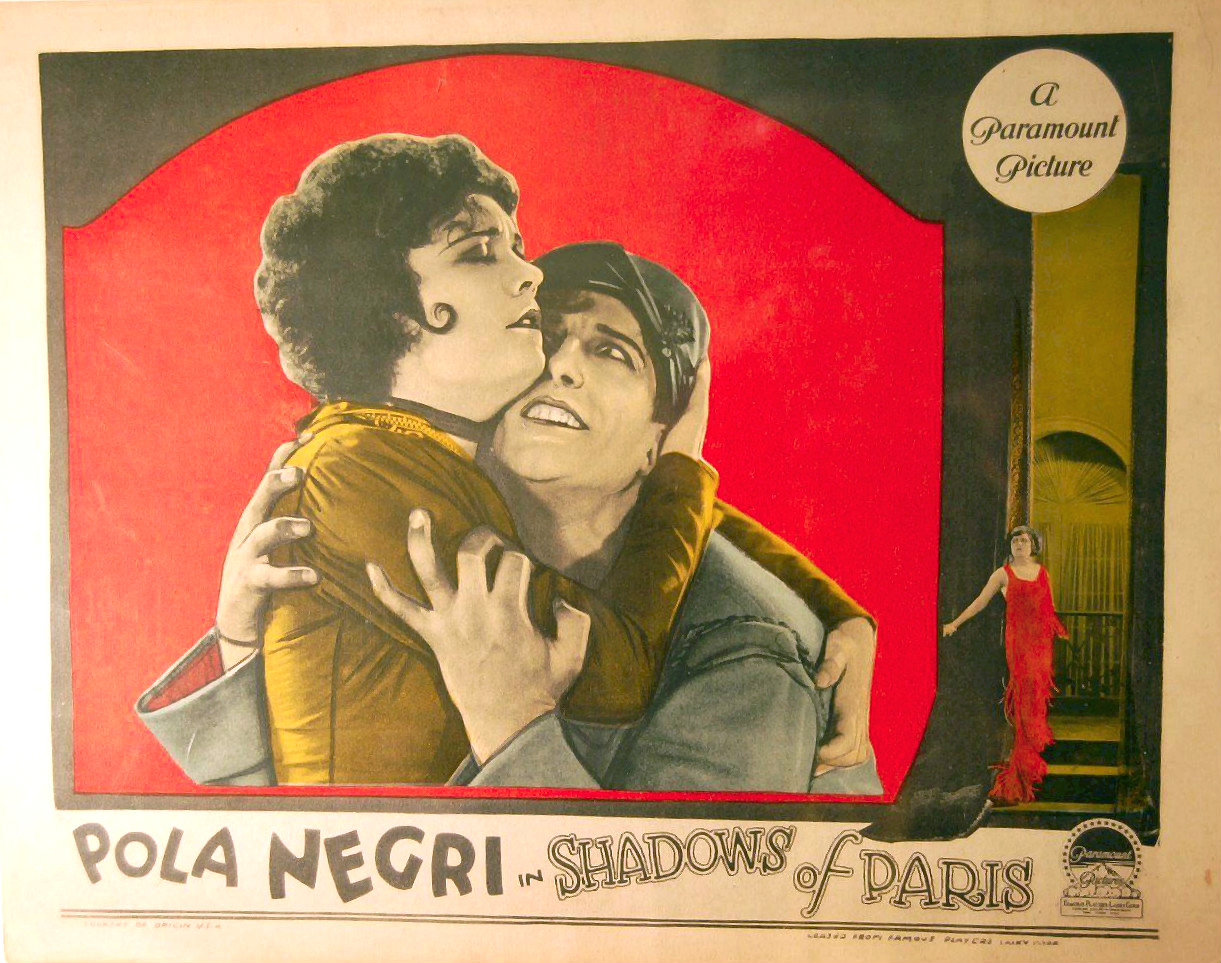
Lobby card

== Plot ==
As described in a film magazine review, Paris in 1918 knows Claire only as "The Blackbird," the Queen of the Apaches. Her lover Fernand is reported killed at the front during the War. She then masquerades as a society woman and becomes the wife of Raoul Grammont, the Minister of the Interior, but occasionally visits her old haunts in disguise. Fernand reappears as an Apache leader and they meet again. After several adventures, Claire comes to see that Fernand is only a monster of greed, and that her affections belong only to the man who made her an honorable wife. Fernand is shot and killed by her husband's secretary, Georges de Croy. Although he knows the truth about Claire and Fernand, he tells Raoul only that he shot a burglar. Claire then confesses all to her husband and is forgiven.

== Cast ==
- Pola Negri as Claire, Queen of the Apaches / The Blackbird
- Charles de Rochefort as Fernand, an Apache
- Huntley Gordon as Raoul Grammont, Minister of the Interior
- Adolphe Menjou as Georges de Croy, His Secretary
- Gareth Hughes as Emile Boule
- Vera Reynolds as Liane
- Rose Dione as Madame Boule, Café Owner
- Rosita Marstini as Madame Vali, A Poetess
- Edward Kipling as Pierre, a Roué
- Maurice de Canonge as Robert, A Taxi Driver
- Frank Nelson as Le Bossu, the Hunchback
- George O'Brien as Louis
- Sam Appel as Monsieur Boule

== Preservation ==
With no prints of Shadows of Paris located in any film archives, it is a lost film. Only a minute of footage survives in the Paramount compilation short Fashions in Love (1936).

== Bibliography ==
- Basinger, Jeanine. Silent Stars. Wesleyan University Press, 2000. ISBN 0-8195-6451-6
