= Gogi Kavtaradze =

Georgian actor (1940–2020)

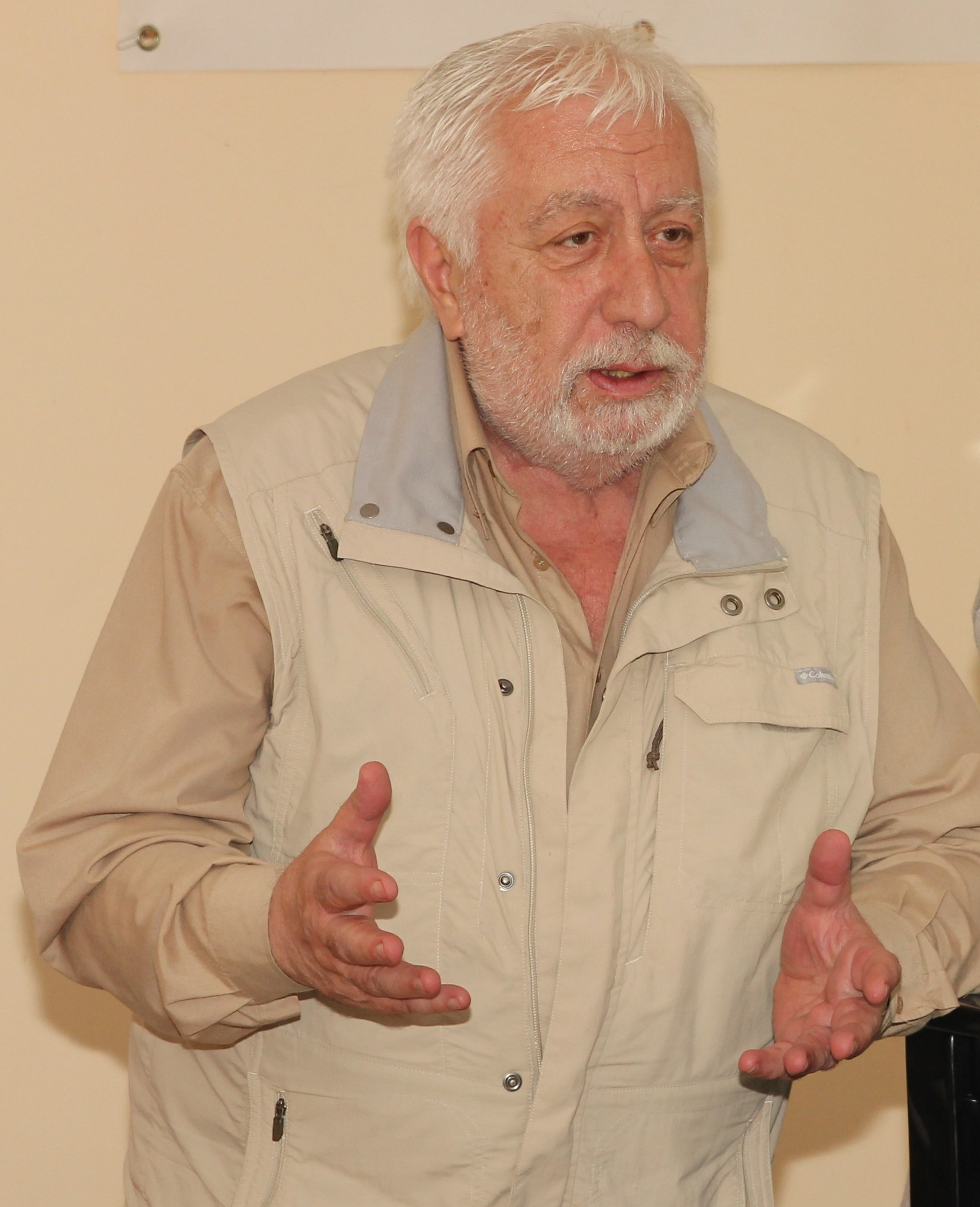
- Born: April 2, 1940; Tbilisi, Georgia
- Died: December 20, 2020 (aged 80); Tbilisi, Georgia
- Occupation: Actor
- Years active: 1964–2002

Georgy Georgyevich Kavtaradze (Georgian: გიორგი (გოგი) ქავთარაძე; 2 April 1940 – 20 December 2020) was a Georgian actor and filmmaker. He was born in Tbilisi, Georgia. His career began in 1957. He was known for his roles as Luka in Don't Grieve (1969), the Commissioner in Melodies of Vera Quarter (1974) and as the Educator in Wounded Game (1977).

Kavtaradze died on 20 December 2020 in Tbilisi at the age of 80.
