= Affection (1972 film) =

1972 film directed by Ludmil Staikov

- Film poster
- Directed by: Ludmil Staikov
- Written by: Alexander Karasimeonov; Konstantin Pavlov
- Starring: Violeta Doneva
- Cinematography: Boris Yanakiev
- Release date: 8 December 1972
- Running time: 90 minutes
- Country: Bulgaria
- Language: Bulgarian

Affection (Bulgarian: Обич, translit. Obich) is a 1972 Bulgarian drama film directed by Ludmil Staikov. It was entered into the 8th Moscow International Film Festival where it won the Golden Prize.

== Cast ==
- Violeta Doneva as Maria
- Nevena Kokanova as Irina
- Stefan Danailov as Nikolay
- Banko Bankov as Petrov, zhurnalist
- Nikolai Binev as Upravitelyat
- Ivan Kondov as Bashtata
- Katya Dineva as Maykata
- Andrey Chaprazov as Arhitekt Stanimirov
- Svetozar Nedelchev as Manasiev
- Anton Karastojanow as Kostov
- Vasil Popiliev as Nelegalniyat
- Dobri Dobrew as Lekaryat
- Lidiya Aleksandrova as Meditzinskata sestra
