= Pierre-Gilles Veber =

French journalist (1896–1968)

- Born: 17 February 1896; Paris, France
- Died: 19 March 1968 (aged 72); Paris, France
- Occupation: Writer

Pierre-Gilles Veber (1896–1968) was a French journalist and screenwriter. He was the son of the playwright Pierre Veber and the husband of the novelist Catherine Agadjanian, who wrote under the pseudonym Georgette Paul. His son Francis Veber became a filmmaker, and his granddaughter Sophie Audouin-Mamikonian is a noted young adult author.

== Selected filmography ==
- Fanfan la Tulipe (1925)
- The Unknown Singer (1931)
- The Duke of Reichstadt (1931)
- I'll Be Alone After Midnight (1931)
- The Eaglet (1931)
- A Son from America (1932)
- Flying Gold (1932)
- Rouletabille the Aviator (1932)
- Macao (1942)

== Bibliography ==
- Klossner, Michael. The Europe of 1500-1815 on Film and Television: A Worldwide Filmography of Over 2550 Works, 1895 Through 2000. McFarland, 2002.
