= Sergo Zakariadze =

Georgian actor

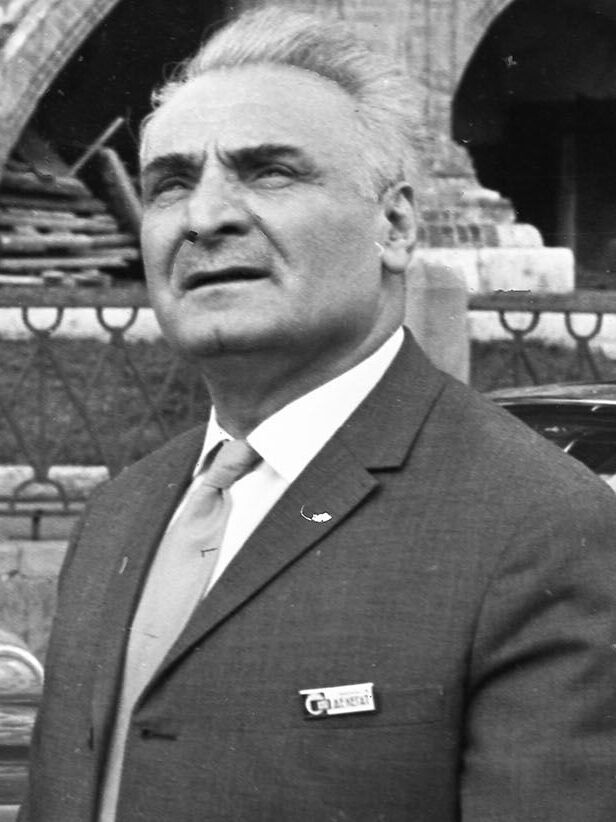
- Born: 1 July 1909; Baku, Russian Empire
- Died: 12 April 1971 (aged 61); Tbilisi, Georgian SSR, Soviet Union
- Occupations: Actor, theater pedagogue
- Years active: 1926–1971

Sergo Zakariadze (Georgian: სერგო ზაქარიაძე [seɾɡo zakʰaɾiad͡ze]; 1 July [O.S. 18 June] 1909 – 12 April 1971) was a Soviet and Georgian stage and film actor and pedagogue. He was awarded the honorary title of People's Artist of the USSR in 1958.

Zakariadze was born in Baku in 1909. He won several prizes, among them Best Actor honors at the 4th Moscow International Film Festival for his portrayal of an old peasant who joined the Red Army in order to find his son in the movie Father of a Soldier (Djariskatsis mama). His final role was in Bondarchuk's Waterloo as Prussian Marschall Gebhard Leberecht von Blücher, just a few months before his death. He died in Tbilisi.

== Filmography ==
Year	Title	Role	Notes
1933	Ukanaskneli djvarosnebi	Torgvai	
1936	Dariko	Simona	
1940	Samshoblo	Sardioni	
1941	Megobroba	Vardeni	
1942	Giorgi Saakadze	Shadiman Chavchavadze	
1944	Kutuzov	Prince Bagration	
1948	Keto da Kote		
1953	The Great Warrior Skanderbeg	Laonicus	
1960	Dge ukanaskneli, dge pirveli	Giorgi	
1962	Zgvis biliki	Old sailor	
1963	Paliastomi	Ivane	
1965	Father of a Soldier	Giorgi Makharashvili	
1966	Shekhvedra tsarsultan	Almaskhani	
1967	Male gazapkhuli mova	Minago	
1969	Don't Grieve	Doctor Levan Tsintsadze	
1970	Waterloo	Gebhard Leberecht von Blücher	(final film role)

== Awards ==
- Medal "For Valiant Labour in the Great Patriotic War 1941–1945"
- Medal "For Labour Valour" (1941)
- Honoured Artist of the Georgian SSR (1943)
- Order of the Red Banner of Labour (1944)
- People's Artist of the Georgian SSR (1946)
- Stalin Prize, 1st class (1946)
- Order of the Badge of Honour (1950)
- Stalin Prize, 2nd class (1952)
- People's Artist of the USSR (1958)
- Lenin Komsomol Prize (1965)
- Lenin Prize (1966)
- Order of Lenin (1967)
- Shota Rustaveli Prize (1971, posthumous)
