= A Necklace for My Beloved =

- სამკაული ჩემი სატრფოსათვის
- Directed by: Tengiz Abuladze
- Screenplay by: Tengiz Abuladze, Tamaz Meliava
- Story by: Akhmed Abu-Bakar
- Produced by: Sergo Sikharulidze
- Cinematography: Lomer Akhvlediani
- Edited by: G. Omiadze
- Music by: Nodar Gabunia
- Production company: Kartuli filmi
- Release date: 1971
- Running time: 75 minutes
- Country: Soviet Union
- Languages: Russian, Georgian

A Necklace for My Beloved (Georgian: სამკაული ჩემი სატრფოსათვის translit. Samkauli satrposatvis, Russian: Ожерелье для моей любимой) is a 1971 Soviet historical comedy-drama film directed by Tengiz Abuladze and co-written with Tamaz Meliava.

== Plot ==
In a Dagestani village, young Bahadur Magomedov wishes to marry Serminaz, the most beautiful girl in the area. His uncle, Duldurum, supports him, as Bahadur's mother, Aisha, promised to marry Duldurum only after her son's wedding—a promise Duldurum has awaited for 15 years. However, a complication arises from a long-standing feud between Bahadur's family and Serminaz's clan, the Mughi. Neither family recalls the original cause of the rivalry, but Aisha insists on honoring their ancestors' traditions by keeping the enmity alive. Despite this, Bahadur, with his uncle's help, follows an ancient tradition to signal his marriage intentions: he tosses his cap into Serminaz's home and then embarks on a journey to find her a suitable gift. Along the way, Bahadur repeatedly encounters Daudi, a swindler who manages to con him out of his money. However, an acrobat named Suguri appears at various times to help Bahadur. His journey leads him through various adventures, including a close call in one village where the locals almost marry him off by force, forcing him to flee in only his underclothes.

After many mishaps, Bahadur and two other suitors, Aziz and Mukhtar, present their gifts to Serminaz's father, Zhandar, and the village elders. Mukhtar brings a Balhar jug, announcing that he has married the artisan who crafted it, while Aziz offers a magical stone he claims can grant wishes. Bahadur, however, presents an unusual gift: a "necklace" crafted from his journey's events, retold in the form of a film script. The elders, moved by Bahadur's storytelling, declare him the winner. Despite Bahadur's victory, Zhandar reminds everyone of the ancient family feud, which still stands in the way of the marriage. The oldest resident of the village, Khasbulat, then reveals that the feud began over a trivial debate about whether the Earth rests on a turtle's back or the horns of a deer. Understanding the senseless origins of their rivalry, Zhandar and Duldurum reconcile, allowing Bahadur and Serminaz to marry. A year later, the couple celebrates the birth of their son, Amru.

== Cast ==
- Ramaz Giorgobiani as Bahadur
- Nani Bregvadze as Aisha
- Erosi Manjgaladze as Duldurum
- Gogi Gegechkori as Gendarme
- Ramaz Chkhikvadze as Daud
- Eteri Abzianidze as Saltanat
- Leonid Yengibarov as Sugur
- Kakhi Kavsadze as Zaur
- Otar Megvinetukhutsesi as Mahomed
- Davit Kobulovi as Khasbulat
- N. Qvlividze as Serminaz
- Temuri Chkhikvadze as Aziz
- Leomer Gugushvili as Detective
- Irakli Nijaradze as Tongue-tied old man
- Irina Shestua asChata
