= Don't Grieve =

1968 film

- Poster
- Directed by: Georgiy Daneliya
- Screenplay by: Revaz Gabriadze
- Based on: My Uncle Benjamin by Claude Tillier
- Produced by: G. Gvenetadze
- Starring: Sergo Zakariadze; Vakhtang Kikabidze
- Cinematography: Vadim Yusov
- Edited by: Galina Spirina
- Music by: Giya Kancheli
- Production company: Mosfilm
- Release date: 22 December 1968; (limited)
- Running time: 90 minutes
- Country: Soviet Union
- Languages: Georgian; Russian

Don't Grieve (Russian: Не горюй!; Georgian: არ იდარდო!) is a 1968 Soviet comedy-drama film directed by Georgiy Daneliya. The film is loosely based on the novel My Uncle Benjamin by French writer Claude Tillier.

In the end of the 19th century, a young doctor, Benjamen Glonti, returns to a small village in his native Georgia after finishing his medical studies in St. Petersburg. A series of comic events unfold around him.

== Plot ==
Set in late 19th-century Georgia during its time in the Russian Empire, the story follows Benjamin Glonti, a carefree young doctor recently returned home after studying in St. Petersburg. Instead of repaying his debts or tending to patients, Benjamin indulges in revelry with his friends while his sister Sofiko supports their large family. Determined to straighten him out, Sofiko arranges for him to meet Mary, the daughter of a wealthy local doctor, though Mary is also being courted by the arrogant Lieutenant Alex Ishkneli. However, Benjamin remains uninterested in marriage, preferring an affair with Margot, the innkeeper’s wife. When his creditor Abessalom Shalvovich demands repayment under threat of imprisonment, Benjamin reluctantly agrees to Sofiko’s plans. Complications arise when Ishkneli forbids him from seeing Mary, sparking Benjamin’s defiance.

During an encounter with the domineering Prince Vamekh Vakhvari, Benjamin is humiliated and retreats to the mountains. When the prince later chokes on a fishbone and no doctor dares treat him, Benjamin offers to help on one condition: Vamekh must humiliate himself in the same way he humiliated Benjamin. Though enraged, the prince complies. The incident becomes public gossip, and Vamekh’s attempt to bribe Benjamin into silence fails. Instead, Abessalom files charges, landing Benjamin in prison for unpaid debts. Sofiko and her husband Luka sell their home to secure Benjamin’s release, moving their family into a forest cabin. Despite his struggles, Benjamin continues to be drawn to Mary, only to discover she is pregnant with Ishkneli’s child. The lieutenant, furious over a confrontation, challenges Benjamin to a duel.

As the duel approaches, news arrives that Mary and Ishkneli plan to elope. Their plans are cut short when Ishkneli insults Prince Vamekh at a train station, leading to a deadly duel where the prince kills him. Overcome with grief, Mary goes into premature labor and dies during childbirth. Benjamin later adopts her orphaned son and reconciles with his past. He returns to Sofiko’s family, vowing to provide the child a loving home. In his final act of redemption, Benjamin accepts the ailing Dr. Levan Tsintsadze’s dying wish to host one last feast and inherits his home. The story closes as Benjamin, now more mature and responsible, embraces a quieter life with his newfound family.

== Cast ==
- Sergo Zakariadze as Doctor Levan Tsintsadze
- Vakhtang Kikabidze as Doctor Benjamen Glonti
- Sofiko Chiaureli as Sofico, Benjamen's sister
- Anastasiya Vertinskaya as Mery Tsintsadze, Levan's daughter
- Lia Gudadze as Margo, Vano's wife
- Veriko Anjaparidze as Kalandadze's mother
- Sesilia Takaishvili as Aunt Domna
- Ariadna Shengelaia as Princess Vahvari
- Gogi Kavtaradze as Luka, Sofico's husband
- Ipolite Khvichia as Sandro, organ-grinder
- Karlo Sakandelidze as Dodo, lawyer
- Dodo Abashidze as Prince Vahvari
- Zurab Kapianidze as His servant

== Music ==
In the film, Kikabidze performs Shen Khar Venakhi, a medieval Georgian hymn.

== Awards ==
Award	Category	Recipient/Nominee	Result
1970 Mar del Plata Film Festival	Special Mentioning	Georgiy Daneliya	Won
1970 Mar del Plata Film Festival	Best Film, International Competition	Georgiy Daneliya	Nominated
