= Ludmil Staikov =

Bulgarian film director

Ludmil Ivanov Staikov
- Born: 18 October 1937 (age 88); Sofia, Bulgaria
- Citizenship: Bulgaria
- Occupation: Film director
- Years active: 1972–1988

Ludmil Ivanov Staikov (Bulgarian: Людмил Иванов Стайков; born 18 October 1937) is a Bulgarian film director. He directed six films between 1972 and 1988. His 1972 film Affection won the Golden Prize at the 8th Moscow International Film Festival. His film Time of Violence (1988) was screened in the Un Certain Regard section at the 1988 Cannes Film Festival.

== Filmography ==
- Affection (1972)
- Amendment to the Law for the Defense of the State (1976)
- Illusion (1980)
- Aszparuh (1981)
- 681 AD: The Glory of the Khan (1984)
- Time of Violence (1988)
