= Copernicus (film) =

- Directed by: Ewa Petelska; Czesław Petelski
- Written by: Jerzy Broszkiewicz; Zdzisław Skowroński
- Starring: Andrzej Kopiczyński
- Cinematography: Stefan Matyjaszkiewicz
- Release date: 14 February 1973
- Running time: 128 minutes
- Country: Poland
- Language: Polish

Copernicus (Polish: Kopernik) is a 1973 Polish historical film directed by Ewa Petelska and Czesław Petelski. The film was entered into the 8th Moscow International Film Festival where it won the Silver Prize. It was also selected as the Polish entry for the Best Foreign Language Film at the 46th Academy Awards, but was not accepted as a nominee.

== Cast ==
- Andrzej Kopiczyński as Mikołaj Kopernik
- Barbara Wrzesińska as Anna Schilling – cousin
- Czesław Wołłejko as Lukasz Watzenrode – bishop of Warmia
- Andrzej Antkowiak as Andrzej Kopernik
- Klaus-Peter Thiele as Georg Joachim von Lauchen gen. Rhetikus
- Henryk Boukołowski as Cardinal Hipolit d'Este
- Hannjo Hasse as Andreas Osiander – editor
- Henryk Borowski as Tiedemann Giese – bishop of Chełmno
- Jadwiga Chojnacka as Thief Kacper's mother
- Aleksander Fogiel as Matz Schilling – Anna's father
- Emilia Krakowska as Kacper's wife
- Gustaw Lutkiewicz as Jan Dantyszek – bishop of Warmia
- Leszek Herdegen as Mönch Mattheusz
- Witold Pyrkosz as Prepozyt Płotowski
- Wiktor Sadecki as Wojciech z Brudzewa

== See also ==
- List of submissions to the 46th Academy Awards for Best Foreign Language Film
- List of Polish submissions for the Academy Award for Best Foreign Language Film
