= The Marriage Maker =

1923 film

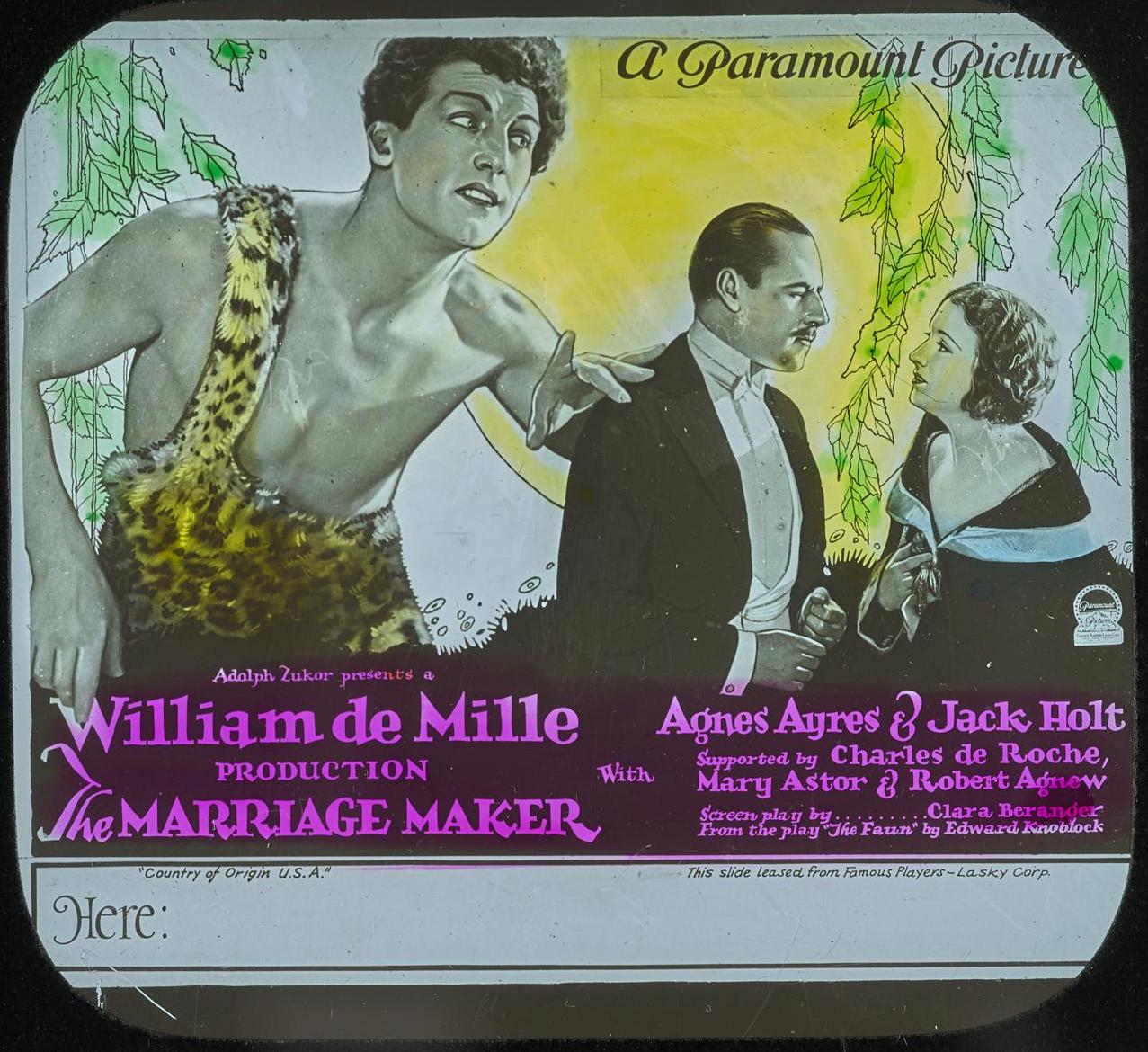
- Lantern slide
- Directed by: William C. deMille
- Written by: Clara Beranger (scenario)
- Based on: The Faun by Edward Knoblock
- Produced by: Adolph Zukor; Jesse Lasky
- Starring: Agnes Ayres; Charles de Rochefort; Mary Astor
- Cinematography: L. Guy Wilky
- Distributed by: Paramount Pictures
- Release date: September 23, 1923
- Running time: 7 reels
- Country: United States
- Language: Silent (English intertitles)

The Marriage Maker is a 1923 American silent fantasy film produced by Famous Players–Lasky and distributed by Paramount Pictures. It is based on a Broadway play, The Faun, by Edward Knoblock. On stage the faun character was played by William Faversham. William C. deMille directed and his wife Clara Beranger wrote the scenario.

== Cast ==
- Agnes Ayres - Alexandra Vancy
- Jack Holt - Lord Stonbury
- Charles de Rochefort - Sylvani
- Robert Agnew - Cyril Overton
- Mary Astor - Vivian Hope-Clarke
- Ethel Wales - Mrs. Hope-Clarke
- Bertram Johns - Fish
- Leo White - Morris

== Preservation ==
With no prints of The Marriage Maker located in any film archives, it is considered a lost film.
