= Olga Borys =

Polish actress (born 1974)

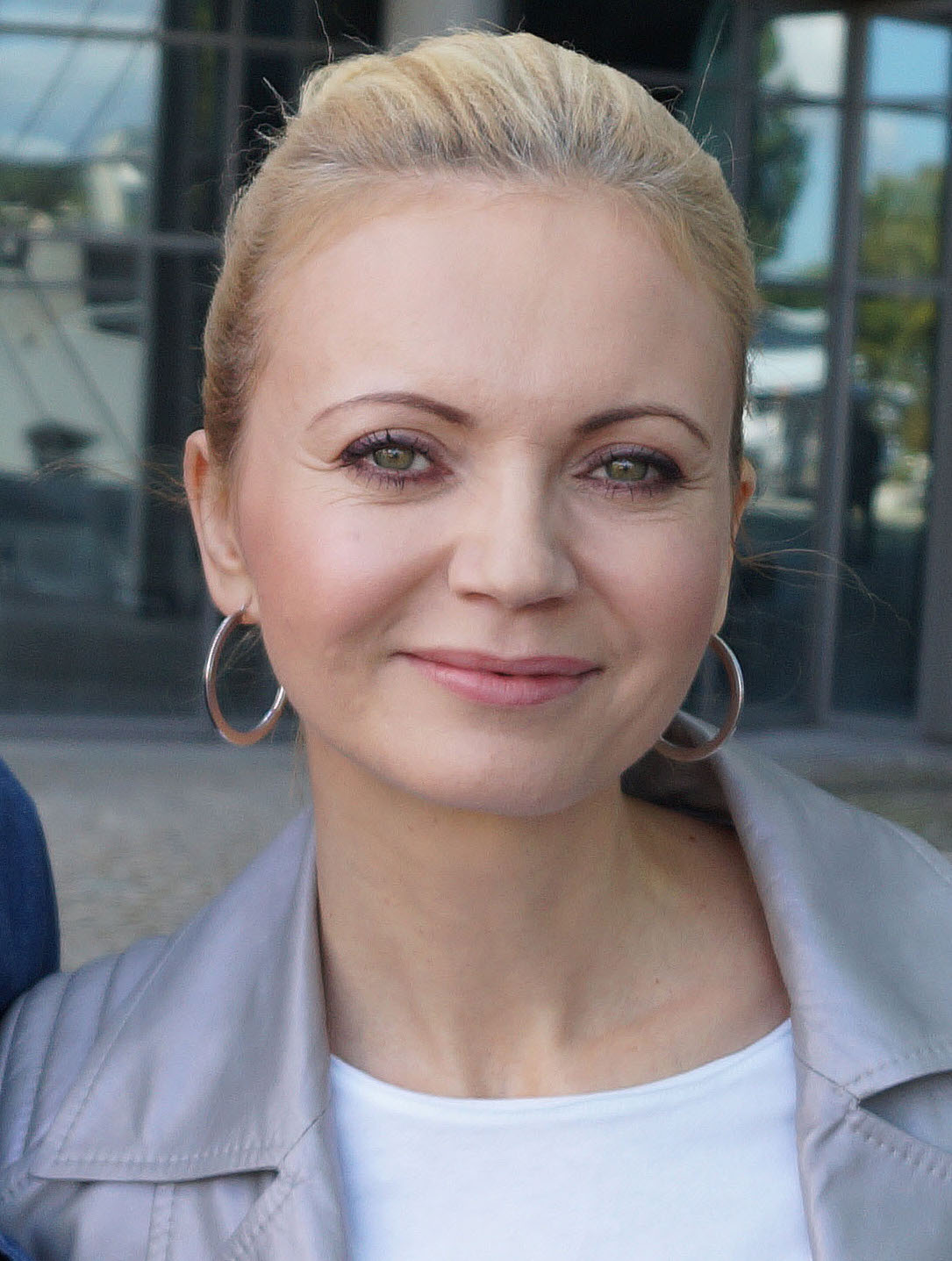
- Pronunciation: [ˈɔlɡa ˈbɔrɨs]
- Born: January 1, 1974 (age 52); Gubin
- Education: National Film School in Łódź
- Occupation: actress
- Years active: 1996–present
- Spouse: Wojciech Majchrzak
- Children: 1

Olga Borys (Polish: [ˈɔlɡa ˈbɔrɨs], born 1 January 1974 in Gubin) is a Polish film, television, theater and dubbing actress.

== Biography ==
She is the daughter of a Polish Land Forces officer. She graduated from the 5th High School in Wrocław. She is a graduate of the National Film School in Łódź (previously she was expelled from the National Academy of Theatre Arts in Wrocław).

She is a laureate of the first prize at the XV Festival of Theatre Schools in Łódź.

She has performed at the Studio Theatre in Warsaw, the Komedia Theatre in Warsaw, the Kwadrat Theatre, the Scena Prezentacje Theatre and as a guest artist at the Juliusz Osterwa Theatre in Lublin. She gained popularity for her role as Zuzia Śnieżanka in the popular comedy series Lokatorzy.

In 2004 she posed for the February issue of the Playboy magazine. In 2007 she won the first edition of the TVP2 show Gwiazdy tańczą na lodzie. She was partnered by Sławomir Borowiecki. In 2016, she participated in the sixth edition of the program Twoja twarz brzmi znajomo, which aired on Polsat television. She took the 7th place.

== Private life ==
Her husband is actor Wojciech Majchrzak, whom she met while studying at the National Academy of Theatre Arts in Wrocław. The couple married on 14 June 1997, the civil ceremony took place in the Rydzyna Castle. On 21 July 2006, the couple's daughter, Mira, was born.

== Filmography ==
- 1999: Klan as Iwona Walczak from Radom
- 1999-2004: Lokatorzy as Zuzia Śnieżanka
- 2000: Twarze i maski as a student (episode 6)
- 2005: Na Wspólnej as Jola
- 2005: Magda M. as Roksana (episode 10)
- 2006: My baby as principal's wife (episode 5)
- 2006: Niania as an actress (episode 16)
- 2006-2007: Na dobre i na złe as receptionist at a clinic (episodes 257, 309 i 313)
- 2008–2010: Klan as Leokadia Szydłowska, Manager of the Financial Department of the District Office of Warsaw
- 2009: Pierwsza miłość as Noemi
- 2010: Samo życie as Liza, wife of Bogdan Wanat
- 2011: Unia serc as kindergarten principal (episode 8)
- 2011-2013: Galeria as Beata Rosiak
- 2012: Ojciec Mateusz as high school principal (episode 106)
- 2012: Ja to mam szczęście! as Helga Schmidt; (episode 20)
- 2014, 2015: M jak miłość as Edyta Ostrowska, Kuba's mother (episodes 1113, 1130)
- 2017: Porady na zdrady as Sylwia
- 2021: Klan as Iwona Walczak

=== Polish dubbing ===
- 1999: Pokémon –
  - Erika (episode 26),
  - Suzy (episode 28),
  - Aya (episode 32),
  - Lara Laramie (episode 33),
  - Duplica (episode 37, 174),
  - Cassandra (episode 44),
  - Jessiebelle (episode 48),
  - Stella (episode 64),
  - Jessie (special episode),
  - Senta (episode 85),
  - Luana (episode 108),
  - Rochelle (episode 120),
  - Arielle (episode 128),
  - Latoya Parker (episode 138),
  - Olesia (episode 148),
  - Anna (episode 165),
  - Temacu (episode 198),
  - Trinity (episode 217),
  - Wendy (episode 231),
  - Tammy (episode 249)
- 2013: The Littlest Pet Shop –
  - Minka,
  - Vi Tannabruzzo,
  - Judi Jo Jamenson

== Theatre roles ==
- Kobieta bez znaczenia – Scena Prezentacje Theatre, Warsaw
- Kto się boi Wirginii Woolf? – Scena Prezentacje Theatre, Warsaw
- Nie teraz, kochanie – Kwadrat Theatre, Warsaw
- Arkadia – Juliusz Osterwa Theatre, Lublin
- Kąpielisko Ostrów – Juliusz Osterwa Theatre, Lublin
- Goło i wesoło
- Boyband – Komedia Theatre, Warsaw

== TV programms ==
- Fort Boyard – second edition (2nd place)
- Śpiewające fortepiany – episode 43
- Mamy Cię! – episode 8
- Ciao Darwin - episode 23
- Gwiazdy tańczą na lodzie – first edition (1st place)
- Kocham Cię, Polsko! – in Katarzyna Zielińska's team
- Twoja twarz brzmi znajomo – sixth edition (7th place)
