= Fille du peuple =

1920 film

- Directed by: Camille de Morlhon
- Starring: Suzanne Herval; Charles de Rochefort; Jean Peyrière
- Release date: 5 November 1920
- Country: France
- Language: Silent film

Fille du peuple (1920) is a French silent film directed by Camille de Morlhon and featuring Charles de Rochefort.

== Cast ==
- Suzanne Herval
- Charles de Rochefort
- Jean Peyrière
