= The Saplings =

1972 film

- Film poster
- Directed by: Rezo Chkheidze
- Written by: Suliko Jgenti
- Produced by: Shota Laperadze
- Starring: Ramaz Chkhikvadze; Kakhi Kavsadze; Mishiko Meskhi; Meri Qoreli
- Cinematography: Abessalom Maisuradze
- Release date: 1972
- Running time: 85 minutes
- Country: Soviet Union
- Languages: Georgian, Russian

The Saplings (Russian: Саженцы, romanized: Sazhentsy, Georgian: ნერგები) is a 1972 Soviet drama directed by Rezo Chkheidze. It was entered into the 8th Moscow International Film Festival where Ramaz Chkhikvadze won the award for Best Actor.

== Plot ==
A grandfather and his grandson set out to find seedlings of very tasty, high-quality pears. They manage to find the seedlings, but the journey home is difficult. Along the way, the grandfather plants a few trees to protect the seedlings from freezing. While hitching a ride, they see a truck nearly fall off a cliff. To save the truck, the grandfather places the seedlings under its wheels for traction. As they return home, he reassures his grandson, saying, "Next year, spring will come again."

== Cast ==
- Ramaz Chkhikvadze as Luka
- Kakhi Kavsadze as Daviti
- Matteo Meskhi as Kakha
- Meri Qoreli as Elisabed, grandma
- Sesilia Takaishvili as Tsitsino
- Zeinab Botsvadze as Mother
- Zura Qapianidze as Cart driver
- Mikheil Vashadze as Dateshidze
- Serafim Strelkov as Mr. Fletcher
