= Aszparuh =

Asparuh
- US video cover
- Directed by: Ludmil Staikov
- Written by: Vera Mutafchieva
- Produced by: Christo Nenov
- Starring: Stoyko Peev; Antoniy Genov; Vanya Tsvetkova; Djoko Rossich; Anya Pencheva; Petar Slabakov
- Cinematography: Boris Yanakiev
- Edited by: Eleanora Ezra; Violeta Toshkova
- Music by: Simeon Pironkov
- Production companies: Studiya za igralni filmi; Kinostudiya no Narodnata armiya; Tvorcheski kolektiv "Sredets"
- Release date: 19 October 1981
- Running time: 323 minutes
- Country: Bulgaria
- Language: Bulgarian

Khan Asparuh (Bulgarian: Хан Аспарух) is a 1981 three-part Bulgarian historical action drama film directed by Ludmil Staikov. It tells the story of Khan Asparuh and the events around the founding of the medieval Bulgarian state in 681 AD. Shot and released on the occasion of the 1300th anniversary of Bulgaria, the film received acclaim and was selected as the Bulgarian entry for the Best Foreign Language Film at the 55th Academy Awards, but was not accepted as a nominee.

In 1984, the film was internationally released as 681 AD: The Glory of Khan in a 92-minute English-language edited version, down from the original 5½ hours. This version earned negative reviews for not presenting the entire plot well and focusing on certain aspects, thus changing the whole feel of the production.

== Cast ==
- Stoyko Peev as Khan Asparuh of Bulgaria
- Antony Genov as Belisarius
- Vassil Mihajlov as Khan Kubrat
- Vania Tzvetkova as Pagane
- Stefan Getsov as The High Priest of Tengri
- Georgi Cherkelov as Belisarius' father
- Iossif Surchadzhiev as Constantine IV

== See also ==
- List of historical drama films
- List of submissions to the 55th Academy Awards for Best Foreign Language Film
- List of Bulgarian submissions for the Academy Award for Best Foreign Language Film
