= My Uncle Benjamin (1969 film) =

1969 film

- Directed by: Edouard Molinaro
- Written by: André Couteaux; Edouard Molinaro; Jean-François Hauduroy
- Based on: My Uncle Benjamin by Claude Tillier
- Produced by: Alain Poiré
- Starring: Jacques Brel; Claude Jade; Bernard Alane
- Cinematography: Alain Levent
- Edited by: Monique Isnardon; Robert Isnardon
- Music by: Jacques Brel
- Production companies: Euro International Films; Gaumont International
- Distributed by: Gaumont Distribution
- Release date: 28 November 1969 (France)
- Running time: 90 minutes
- Countries: France; Italy
- Language: French
- Box office: $20.4 million

My Uncle Benjamin (French: Mon oncle Benjamin) is a 1969 French-Italian historical comedy film directed by Édouard Molinaro and starring Jacques Brel, Claude Jade and Bernard Alane. It was shot at the Billancourt Studios in Paris and on location around Yonne. The film's sets were designed by the art director François de Lamothe. The film is based on a once-popular French comic novel My Uncle Benjamin by Claude Tillier (1843). The 1969 film Don't Grieve, directed by the Georgian Georgi Daneliya, is also based on Tillier's novel as was Francis Bousquet's 1942 comic opera Mon oncle Benjamin. The film was released on 28 November 1969.

== Plot ==
The story is set in 1750 during the time of Louis XV. Benjamin (Jacques Brel) is a country doctor in love with the beautiful innkeeper's daughter, Manette (Claude Jade), but she refuses his advances until he produces a marriage contract. After suffering a humiliating practical joke and condemned to prison, Benjamin escapes with Manette, who realizes she prefers happiness to a marriage contract after all.

== Cast ==
- Jacques Brel as Benjamin Rathery
- Claude Jade as Manette
- Bernard Alane as Pont-Cassé
- Robert Dalban as Innkeeper
- Bernard Blier as Marquis
- Rosy Varte as Bettine
- Paul Frankeur as Minxit
- Lyne Chardonnet as Arabelle
- Armand Mestral as Machecourt
- Paul Préboist as Parlenta
- Daniela Surina as Marquise of Cambyse
- Christine Aurel as Madame Chapelle
- Gérard Boucaron as Le docteur Fata

== Bibliography ==
- Klossner, Michael. The Europe of 1500-1815 on Film and Television: A Worldwide Filmography of Over 2550 Works, 1895 Through 2000. McFarland, 2002.
