= Princess Masha =

1927 film

- Directed by: René Leprince
- Starring: Claudia Victrix; Jean Toulout; Romuald Joubé
- Cinematography: André-Wladimir Reybas; Julien Ringel
- Production company: Société des Cinéromans
- Distributed by: Pathé Films
- Release date: 1927
- Country: France
- Languages: Silent; French intertitles

Princess Masha (French: Princesse Masha) is a 1927 French silent film directed by René Leprince and starring Claudia Victrix, Jean Toulout and Romuald Joubé.

The film's sets were designed by the art director Robert Mallet-Stevens.

== Cast ==
- Claudia Victrix as Masha
- Jean Toulout as Général Tcherkoff
- Romuald Joubé as Roger Lantenac
- André Marnay as Krivoshine
- Andrée Brabant as Juana Gallardo
- Fernande Raynal
- Paul Guidé as Colonel Goubiesky
- Jean Peyrière as Kerdiakoff
- Raphaël Lievin as Vakirschef
- Boris de Fast as Tzerem Lama
- Hugues de Bagratide
- Édouard Hardoux as Piotre Ivanoff

== Bibliography ==
- Rège, Philippe. Encyclopedia of French Film Directors, Volume 1. Scarecrow Press, 2009.
