= 8th Moscow International Film Festival =

Film festival

- Location: Moscow, Soviet Union
- Founded: 1959
- Awards: Grand Prix
- Festival date: 10–23 July 1973
- Website: http://www.moscowfilmfestival.ru

The 8th Moscow International Film Festival was held from 10 to 23 July 1973. The Golden Prizes were awarded to the Soviet film That Sweet Word: Liberty! directed by Vytautas Žalakevičius and the Bulgarian film Affection directed by Ludmil Staikov.

== Jury ==
- Sergei Bondarchuk (USSR – President of the Jury)
- Aleksey Batalov (USSR)
- Julio Bracho (Mexico)
- Paulin Soumanou Vieyra (Senegal)
- Jerzy Hoffman (Poland)
- Antonín Kachlík (Czechoslovakia)
- René Clément (France)
- Gina Lollobrigida (Italy)
- Károly Makk (Hungary)
- Kurt Maetzig (East Germany)
- Toshiro Mifune (Japan)
- Tolomush Okeyev (USSR)
- George Stevens (USA)
- Christo Christov (Bulgaria)
- Kamal El Sheikh (Egypt)

== Films in competition ==
The following films were selected for the main competition:

English title	Original title	Director(s)	Production country
Icheend N'	Icheend N'	Badrahin Sumhu	Mongolia
Explosion	Explozia	Mircea Drăgan	Romania
Tati	Tati, a garota	Bruno Barreto	Brazil
Days of Betrayal	Dny zrady	Otakar Vávra	Czechoslovakia
Home Sweet Home	Home Sweet Home	Benoît Lamy	Belgium
The Thirsties	Al zamioun	Mohamed Shukri Jameel	Iraq
The Promised Land	La tierre prometida	Miguel Littín	Chile
Ripe Cherries	Reife Kirschen	Horst Seemann	East Germany
Tears of Blood	Und der Regen verwischt jede Spur	Alfred Vohrer	West Germany, France
Empire M	إمبراطور ميم Empire M	Hussein Kamal	Egypt
Cuando quiero llorar no lloro	Cuando quiero llorar no lloro	Mauricio Walerstein	Venezuela
Copernicus	Kopernik	Ewa Petelska, Czesław Petelski	Poland, East Germany
Affection	Обич, Obich	Ludmil Staikov	Bulgaria
The Dupes	المخدوعون Al-makhdu'un	Tewfik Saleh	Syria
Oklahoma Crude	Oklahoma Crude	Stanley Kramer	United States
On Own Will	Swayamvaram	Adoor Gopalakrishnan	India
Plot	L'Attentat	Yves Boisset	France, Italy, West Germany
Shinobu Kawa	Shinobu Kawa	Kei Kumai	Japan
The Saplings	Саженцы, Sazhentsy	Rezo Chkheidze	Soviet Union
Lina's Wedding	Jentespranget	Knud Leif Thomsen	Denmark, Norway
17th Parallel, Nights and Days	Vĩ tuyến 17 ngày và đêm	Hải Ninh	North Vietnam
The Office Picnic	The Office Picnic	Tom Cowan	Australia
The Battle of Sutjeska	Sutjeska	Stipe Delić	Yugoslavia
Those Years	Aquellos años	Felipe Cazals	Mexico
The Triple Echo	Triple Echo	Michael Apted	Great Britain
Touki Bouki	Touki bouki	Djibril Diop Mambéty	Senegal
The Assassination of Matteotti	Il delitto Matteotti	Florestano Vancini	Italy
Photography	Fotografia	Pál Zolnay	Hungary
The Man from Maisinicu	El hombre de Maisinicú	Manuel Pérez	Cuba
That Sweet Word: Liberty!	Это сладкое слово — свобода!, Eto sladkoye slovo - svoboda!	Vytautas Žalakevičius	Soviet Union

== Awards ==
- Golden Prize:
  - That Sweet Word: Liberty! by Vytautas Žalakevičius
  - Affection by Ludmil Staikov
- Golden Prize for Direction: Stanley Kramer for Oklahoma Crude
- Special Prizes:
  - The Assassination of Matteotti by Florestano Vancini
  - The Battle of Sutjeska by Stipe Delić
  - Those Years by Felipe Cazals
- Silver Prizes:
  - Photography by Pál Zolnay
  - Copernicus by Ewa Petelska, Czesław Petelski
  - Plot by Yves Boisset
- Prizes:
  - Best Actor: Sergio Corrieri for The Man from Maisinicu
  - Best Actor: Ramaz Chkhikvadze for The Saplings
  - Best Actress: Tra Giang for 17th Parallel, Nights and Days
  - Best Actress: Ingerid Vardund for Lina's Wedding
- Diplomas:
  - Days of Betrayal by Otakar Vávra
  - Home Sweet Home by Benoît Lamy
  - The Saplings by Rezo Chkheidze
  - Explosion by Mircea Drăgan
  - Touki Bouki by Djibril Diop Mambéty
- Prix FIPRESCI: Touki Bouki by Djibril Diop Mambéty
- Special Mention: The Man from Maisinicu by Manuel Pérez
