= Charles de Rochefort =

French actor (1887–1952)

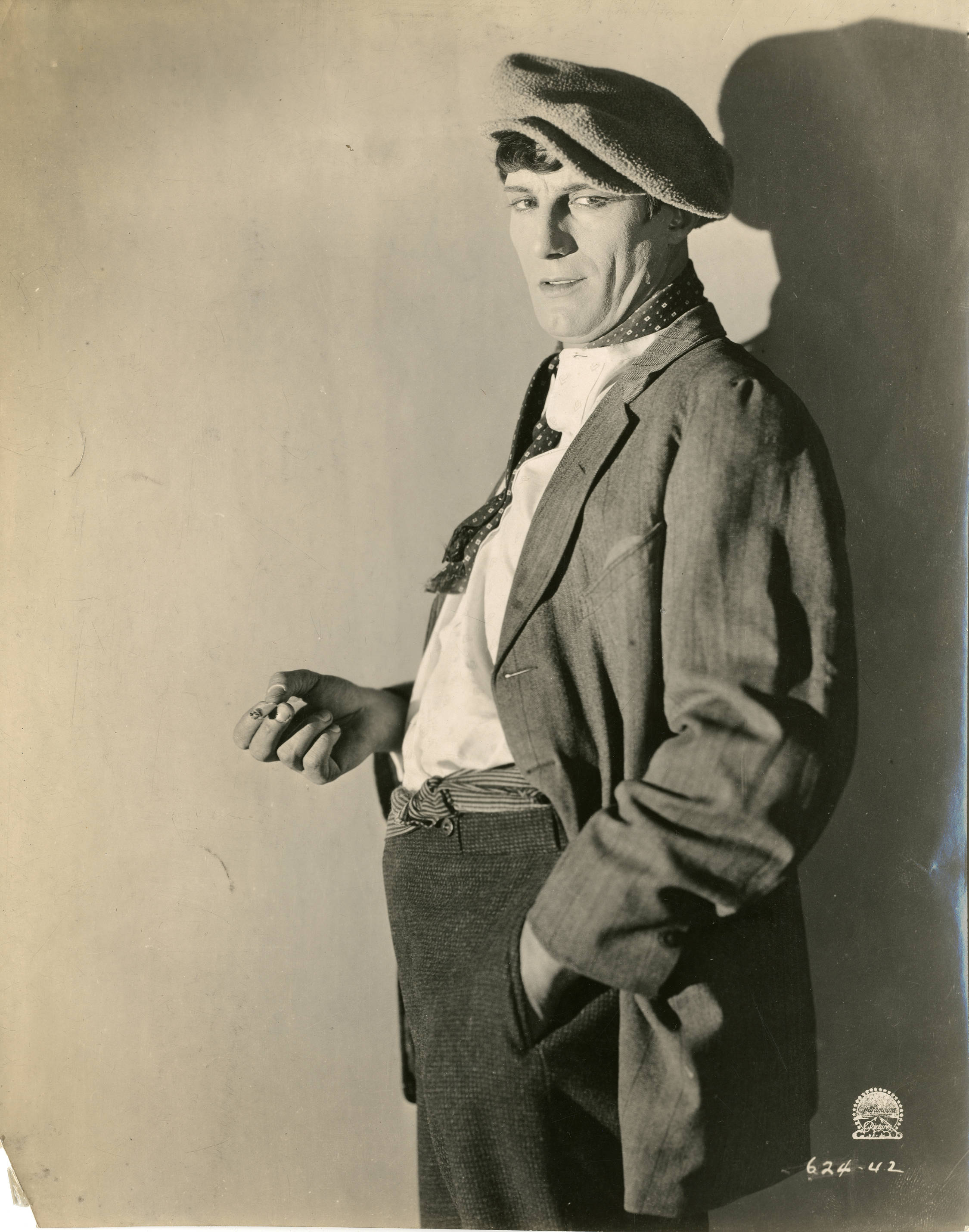
- De Roche in 1924
- Born: Charles d'Authier de Rochefort; 7 July 1887; Port-Vendres, Pyrénées-Orientales, France
- Died: 31 January 1952 (aged 64); Paris, France
- Occupation: Actor
- Years active: 1911–1932

Charles d'Authier de Rochefort (7 July 1887 – 31 January 1952) was a French film actor, principally of the silent era. He appeared in 34 films between 1911 and 1932. He also directed seven films between 1930 and 1931.

== Early life ==
De Rochefort was born in Port-Vendres, Pyrénées-Orientales, France. He was the son of Paul Charles Dominique d'Authier de Rochefort and Camille Caroline Rose Félicité Guelfucci.

== Career ==
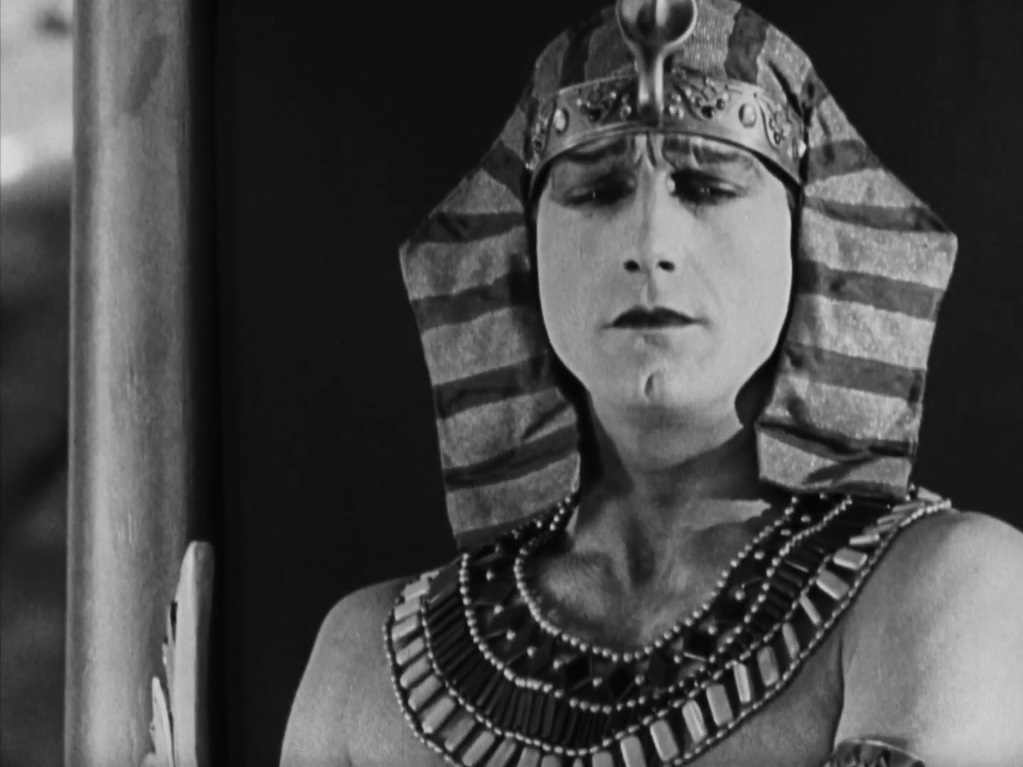
De Roche as Pharaoh Rameses II in The Ten Commandments (1923)

He portrayed Pharaoh Rameses II in the biblical prologue of Cecil B. DeMille's silent film The Ten Commandments (1923).

Among the films he directed was the French-language version of Paramount on Parade (1930), and Magie moderne (1931), a French film about television released as Televisione in Italy, along with five other versions in five different languages. This latter film was produced at the Joinville Studios of Paramount Pictures at Joinville-le-Pont in Paris.

In 1943 he wrote the book Le Film de Mes Souvenirs (Secrets de Vedettes).

== Personal life ==
During the Second World War he was interned by the German occupiers but was released due to the influence of his friend, the actress Michèle Alfa.

== Death ==
He died 31 January 1952 in Paris, France.

== Selected filmography ==
- The Mask of Horror (1912)
- Fille du peuple (1920)
- The Spanish Jade (1922)
- The Black Diamond (1922)
- King of the Camargue (1922)
- Law of the Lawless (1923)
- The Cheat (1923)
- Hollywood (1923) cameo appearance
- The Marriage Maker (1923)
- The Ten Commandments (1923)
- The White Moth (1924)
- Shadows of Paris (1924)
- Love and Glory (1924)
- The Princess and the Clown (1924)
- Madame Sans-Gene (1925) with Gloria Swanson
- Paramount en parade (1930) director; French-language version of Paramount on Parade
- Television (1931)
- Magie moderne (1931) co-director with Dimitri Buchowetzki; other versions released by Paramount: in Dutch (De Sensatie van de Toekomst), Italian (Televisione), Swedish (Tradlost och karleksfullt), Polish (Swiat bez grnic), Czech (Svet bez hranic), and Romanian (Televiziune) versions
- Southern Cross (1932)
