= Face à l'Océan =

1920 film

- Directed by: René Leprince
- Cinematography: Léonce-Henri Burel; Julien Ringel
- Release date: 5 November 1920
- Country: France
- Language: Silent film

Face à l'Océan is a 1920 French silent film directed by René Leprince.

== Cast ==
- Adrienne Duriez ... Hélène d'Argel
- Madeleine Erickson ... Louise Kermarech
- Christiane Delval ... Germaine
- Léone Balme
- Cosette Dacier
- Hélène Darly
- Jean Lorette
- Ernest Maupain
- Jean Salvat
- Schauer
