= René Leprince =

French silent film director

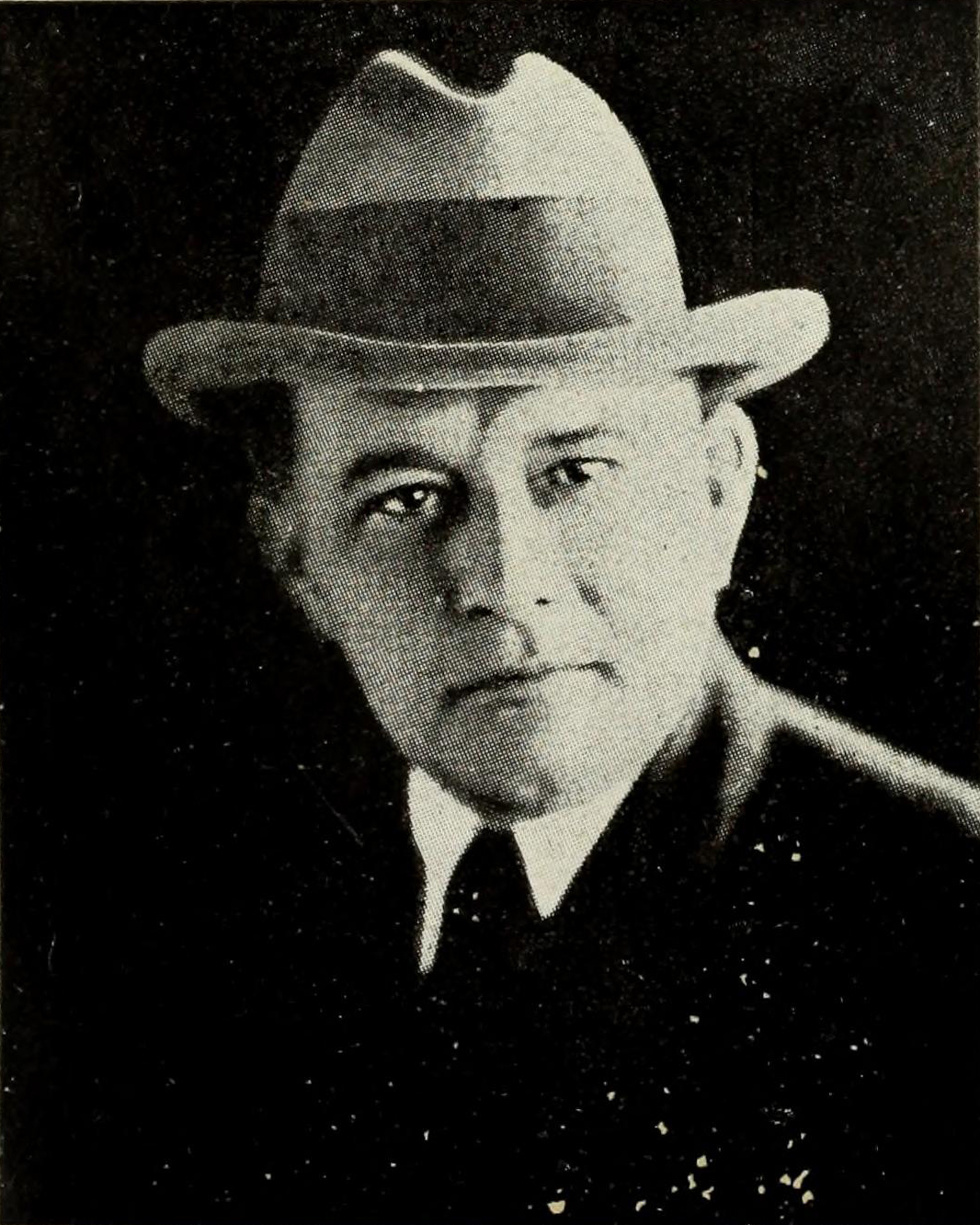
- Born: 1876; Sathonay, Rhône, France
- Died: 25 May 1929 (aged 52–53); France
- Occupations: Film director, silent actor
- Years active: 1908—1929

Un bon petit diable (1923).

Mon Oncle Benjamin (1924).

René Leprince (1876 – 25 May 1929) was an early French silent film director best known for his silent films of the 1910s and 1920s.

In film, Leprince began as an actor in 1908 and dabbled with directing. In 1911 he moved into directing permanently and directed some 70 films between 1908 and 1929.

== Selected filmography ==
- La folie du doute (1920)
- Face à l'Océan (1920)
- My Uncle Benjamin (1924)
- Princess Lulu (1925)
- Fanfan la Tulipe (1925)
- Princess Masha (1927)
- Temptation (1929)
