= Andrzej Kopiczyński =

Polish actor

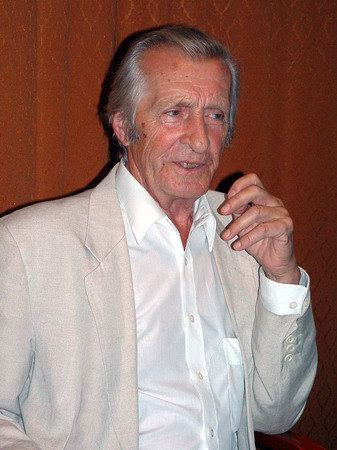
- Born: 15 April 1934; Międzyrzec Podlaski, Poland
- Died: 13 October 2016 (aged 82); Warsaw, Poland
- Occupation: Actor
- Years active: 1955-2016

Andrzej Kopiczyński (15 April 1934 – 13 October 2016) was a Polish actor. He appeared in more than 50 films and television between 1958 and 2016.

== Selected filmography ==
- Copernicus (1973)
- Czterdziestolatek (1974–1977)
- Korczak (1990)
- With Fire and Sword (1999)
