= Francis Bousquet =

French composer (1890–1942)

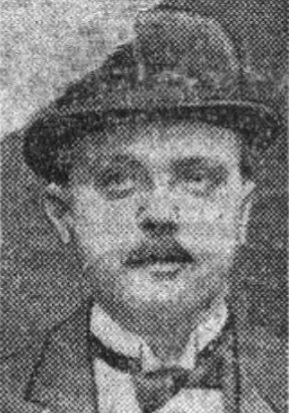
- Bousquet in 1923
- Born: Charles-Francis Bousquet; 9 September 1890; Marseille, France
- Died: 21 December 1942 (aged 52); Roubaix, France
- Occupations: Composer; music pedagogue

Francis Bousquet (9 September 1890 – 21 December 1942) was a French composer. Educated at the Conservatoire de Paris, he won the Prix de Rome in 1923. His compositions included three operas, a ballet, and several symphonic and chamber music works. From 1926 until his death he was also the director of Conservatoire de Roubaix. Bousquet was born in Marseille and died in Roubaix at the age of 52. He had been awarded the Légion d'honneur in 1934.

== Life and career ==
Bousquet was born in Marseille and began his musical studies there before enrolling in the Conservatoire de Paris in 1907 where he studied under Xavier Leroux, André Gedalge and Charles-Marie Widor. He won the conservatory's First Prize in harmony in 1909 and First Prize in counterpoint in 1910. His studies were interrupted for four years by World War I when he served in an engineering regiment of the French Army. From 1915 to 1918, Nadia and Lili Boulanger, both graduates of the conservatory, published Gazette des Classes du Conservatoire with news of French musical life and letters from the conservatory's students who had been dispersed by the war. In a letter published in the 27 November 1916 issue Bousquet wrote from the front:

[The gazette] has brought us back together. Music, dormant for an instant in the depths of memory, begins to sing again, and the musical life evoked in a few pages, with the exquisite recollections that it brings, achieves the miracle of awakening, amid so much desolation, an ardent longing for the future.

A recipient of the Croix de Guerre, Bousquet returned to the conservatoire after the war and continued his studies in composition. He entered the competition for the Prix de Rome three times, gaining the Second Prize in 1921 and 1922 and the First Prize in 1923 for his cantata Béatrix. (Note: In the final round of the Prix de Rome, the competitors were all required to set the same text as a cantata. Béatrix, the text for the 1923 final competition piece, was written by Jean Gandrey-Réty (1901–1962). That year, the Grand First Prize was awarded jointly to Bousquet and Jeanne Leleu.) The First Prize came with a bursary that allowed the recipient to stay at the Villa Medici in Rome for two years and to travel for up to three more years.

On his return from Rome in 1926, Bousquet took up an appointment as the director of the Conservatoire de Roubaix, a position he held until his death. In the 1930s he was a founder of the Association des Directeurs d'Écoles et Conservatoires de Musique Nationaux and later became its honorary president. In 1934 he was awarded the Légion d'honneur for his artistic career and military service. He also worked as journalist for the Parisian arts journal Comœdia during the occupation of France in World War II.

Bousquet continued to compose throughout his career. His first opera, Zorriga, was written for and performed at the Théâtre des Arènes in Béziers in 1925. His second, Sarati le Terrible, premiered at the Théâtre de l'Opéra-Comique in 1928. Both were set in North Africa and contained elements of Arabic music. His last works were the three-act comic opera Mon oncle Benjamin (Note: Mon oncle Benjamin was based on Claude Tillier's 1842 comic novel of the same name. The novel also served as the inspiration for the 1969 French film Mon oncle Benjamin starring Jacques Brel.) and the symphony Hannibal. Mon oncle Benjamin premiered at the Théâtre de l'Opéra-Comique on 10 March 1942 with Roger Bourdin in the title role. Hannibal premiered on 30 November 1942 in Paris. Bousquet died in Roubaix at the age of 52, three weeks after the Hannibal premiere.

In his obituary in Comœdia, Tony Aubin wrote that Bousquet's works reflected "one of the most authentic natures of our time" and displayed an "enlightened art, sober but expressive, traversed by bright lightning or bathed in noble melancholy."

== Works ==
Bousquet's compositions included:

Stage works

- Zorriga, opera in four acts, libretto by Paul Verdert and Jean Camp; premiered at the Théâtre des Arènes, Béziers, 21 June 1925
- L'Esclave, ballet in one act on a subject by Belloni; (Note: "Belloni" may refer to Joseph Belloni, an Italian born dancer and choreographer who choreographed several ballets for the Théâtre des Arènes in Béziers and was the maître de ballet at the Grand Théâtre de Bordeaux during that period.) published by Éditions Max Eschig, 1927
- Sarati le Terrible, opera in four acts, libretto by Jean Vignaud; premiered at the Théâtre de l'Opéra-Comique, Paris, 9 May 1928
- Mon oncle Benjamin, comic opera in three acts, libretto by Georges Ricou; premiered at the Théâtre de l'Opéra-Comique, Paris, 10 March 1942

Instrumental works

- Poeme, chamber music for string quartet and piano, dedicated to the violinist Roger Debonnet; published by Éditions Maurice Senart, 1921
- Soirs d'Afrique, orchestral suite; premiered by the Orchestre Lamoureux, Paris, 3 March 1932. The work is based on Arabic and Spanish folk music collected by Bousquet during a long voyage to North Africa.
- Concerto ibérique, concerto in D minor for solo cello and orchestra; premiered by the cellist Maurice Maréchal and the Concerts Colonne orchestra, Paris, December 1937
- Argotera, concerto for solo horn and orchestra; published by Éditions Charles Gras, 1939. The piece was written for the French hornist Jean Devémy (1898-1969) who recorded it on the Action Artistique label (Note: The Action Artistique label was sponsored by the Vichy Government and from 1942 produced 40 recordings of works by French composers.) in 1943.
- Hannibal, symphony; premiered by the Orchestre de l'Association des Concerts Pierné, Paris, 30 November 1942
