= My Uncle Benjamin (novel) =

1843 novel by Claude Tillier

- 1910 edition of novel
- Author: Claude Tillier
- Language: French
- Genre: Comedy
- Publication date: 1843
- Publication place: France
- Media type: Print

My Uncle Benjamin (French: Mon oncle Benjamin) is an 1843 historical comedy novel by the French writer Claude Tillier. It takes place in the 1750s during the reign of Louis XV.

== Adaptations ==
The novel has been adapted for the screen several times, including a 1924 French silent film My Uncle Benjamin, a 1969 French-Italian film My Uncle Benjamin as well as the 1968 Soviet version Don't Grieve.

== Bibliography ==
- Chances, Ellen. Andrei Bitov: The Ecology of Inspiration. Cambridge University Pressm 1993.
- Goble, Alan. The Complete Index to Literary Sources in Film. Walter de Gruyter, 1999.
- Wells, Benjamin Willis. A Century of French Fiction. Dodd, Mead, 1898.
