= Ramaz Chkhikvadze =

Georgian actor

- რამაზ ჩხიკვაძე
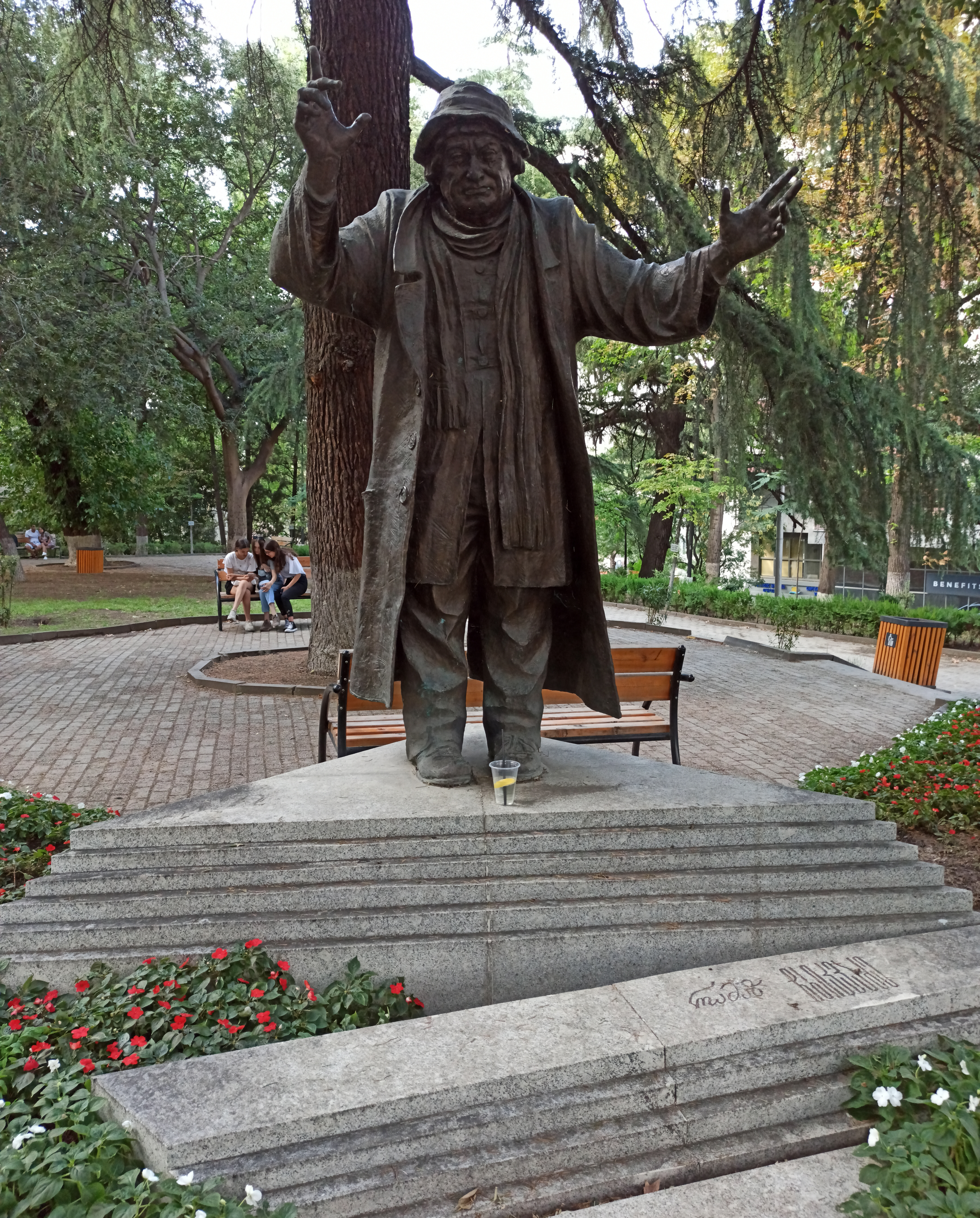
- Chkhikvadze's statue in 9 April Park, Tbilisi
- Born: February 28, 1928; Tbilisi, Georgian SSR, Soviet Union
- Died: October 17, 2011 (aged 83); Tbilisi, Georgia
- Education: Shota Rustaveli Theatre and Film University
- Spouse: Natasha Chkhikvadze
- Parent: Grigol Chkhikvadze

Ramaz Grigolis dze Chkhikvadze (Note: Georgian: რამაზ გრიგოლის ძე ჩხიკვაძე, romanized: Ramaz Grigolis dze Chkhik'vadze; Russian: Рамаз Григорьевич Чхиквадзе, romanized: Ramaz Grigoryevich Chkhikvadze) (28 February 1928 – 17 October 2011) was a Georgian film and theater actor. First appearing in the 1954 film The Dragonfly (Chrichina), he starred in over 60 films during his career. He won the award for Best Actor at the 8th Moscow International Film Festival for his role in The Saplings.

Ramaz Chkhikvadze caused a sensation when he appeared on stage as Richard III at the 1979 Edinburgh Festival in a production of Shakespeare's play by the Rustaveli Theatre Company of Tbilisi, Georgia, then still part of the Soviet Union.

Honoring him posthumously, Georgian President Saakashvili issued a statement in which he said "Mr. Ramaz was a distinguished star of Georgian film and theatre and a creator of an entire epoch. The cultural heritage expressed by his unique talent and originality, on which generations have been brought up, will forever stay in the memories of his audience."

== Selected filmography ==
- The Dragonfly (Chrichina) (1954) – Shota
- Eteris simgera (1956) – Vano
- Tsarsuli zapkhuli (1959) – Zurabi
- Sad aris sheni bedniereba Mzia? (1959) – Agronomist
- Dge ukanaskneli, dge pirveli (1960) – Taksist
- Tkhunela (1962)
- Londre (1966) – Major of town
- The Plea (1967) – Matsili
- Pilatelistis sikvdili (1969) – Vachnadze
- Tskaldidoba (1970) – Antoni
- A Necklace for My Beloved (Samkauli satrfosatvis) (1971) – Daud
- The Saplings (1972) – Luka
- Mtvaris Motatseba (1972) – Shardin Alshibaia
- Melodies of Vera Quarter (1973) – merkant Panke
- Istoki (1974) – Stalin
- Chiriki da Chikotela (1975) – Major Gitar
- Erti nakhvit shekvareba (1975) – Akram
- Gaqtseva gatenebisas (1975) – Daniela
- Namdvili tbiliselebi da skhvebi (1976)
- The Wishing Tree (1976) – Priest Okhrokhine
- Cinema (1977)
- Racha, chemi sikvaruli (1977)
- Sikvaruli, khandzari da pompiero (1977) – Pavle
- Qalaqi Anara (1978) – Antoni
- Srochnyy vyzov (1979) – Georgy Nikolaevich
- XIX saukunis qartuli qronika (1979) – Nachalnik kantselyarii
- Dyuma na Kavkaze (1980)
- Santa Esperansa (1980) – Padre
- Tbilisi, Parizi, Tbilisi (1980)
- Ruki vverkh! (1981)
- Tskheli zapkhulis sami dge (1981)
- Gza shinisaken (1981)
- Richard III (1982) – Richard III
- Gde-to plachet ivolga... (1982) – Jacques
- Ya gotov prinyat vyzov (1983)
- Pobeda (1985) – Stalin
- Mournful Unconcern (Skorbnoye beschuvstviye) (1987) – Captain Shotover
- Kak doma, kak dela? (1987)
- Nazaris ukanaskneli lotsva (1988)
- Ashik Kerib (1988)
- Vozvrashchenie Khodzhi Nasreddina (1989)
- Zakat (1990)
- Tetri bairagebi (1990) – Shoshia
- The Dusk (1990)
- O, ra tkbilia ganshorebis es nazi sevda (1991)
- Amkhanag Stalinis mogzauroba aprikashi (1991)
- Vostochnyy roman (1992)
- Ofitsiant s zolotym podnosom (1992) – Stalin
- Znedatsemuli angelozi (1993)
- Siluet v okne naprotiv (1993)
- A Chef in Love (1996) – Anton Gogoladze
- Midjachvuli raindebi (2000) – Luarsab
- In August of 1944 (2001) – Stalin
- Shoes from America (2001) – Issac
- Chernyy prints (2004) – Gekkeren / Professor
- Artists cuts (ხელოვანთა კადრებიდან, 2005, by Shota Kalandadze)
- The Rainbowmaker (2008) – Grandfather Georgi (final film role)

== Awards ==
- 1972 – People's Artist of Georgia SSR
- 1981 – People's Artist of the USSR; Shota Rustaveli Prize
