= Suliko Jgenti =

Georgian playwright and filmmaker

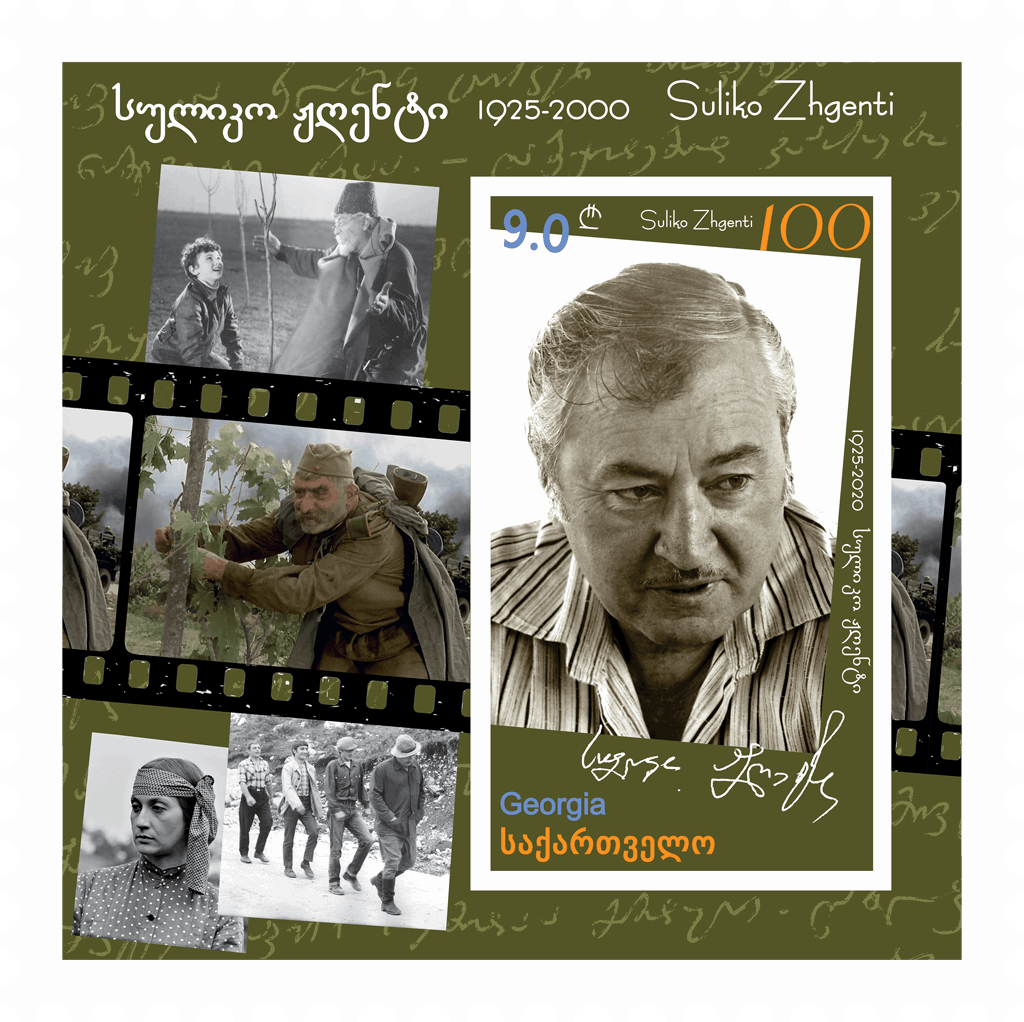
Jgenti on a 2025 stamp of Georgia

Suliko Jgenti (1920–2000), credited also as Suliko Zhgenti, was a famous Georgian playwright and filmmaker. His movie Father of a Soldier became one of the popular movies in the former USSR. The movie tells the tragic story of a father who is searching for his son – a Soviet soldier during World War II.

== Filmography ==
- 1961 — Костры горят – Bonfires Burn
- 1962 — Мяч и поле – Ball and Field
- 1964 — Отец солдата – Father of a Soldier
- 1969 — Ну и молодёжь! – What a Youth!
- 1969 — Свет в наших окнах – Light in Our Windows
- 1971 — Тепло твоих рук – Warm in Your Hands
- 1972 — Саженцы – Young Plants
- 1973 — Сибирский дед – Siberian Grandfather
- 1977 — Рача, любовь моя – Racha, My Love
- 1978 — Мой друг дядя Ваня – My Friend Uncle Vanya
- 1980 — Твой сын, Земля – Your Son, Earth
- 1986 — До луны рукой подать – So Close to the Moon
- 1987 — Корни – Roots
- 1987 — Пляжный разбойник – Gangster at the Beach
- 1988 — Житие Дон Кихота и Санчо – The Lives of Don Quixote and Sancho
