= Julien Ringel =

French cinematographer

- Occupation: Cinematographer
- Years active: 1914-1936 (film )

Julien Ringel was a French cinematographer of the silent and early sound eras.

== Selected filmography ==
- Face à l'Océan (1920)
- La folie du doute (1920)
- The Blaireau Case (1923)
- La gitanilla (1924)
- My Uncle Benjamin (1924)
- Princess Masha (1927)
- Prince Jean (1928)
- Nicole and Her Virtue (1932)
- Love and Luck (1932)

== Bibliography ==
- Powrie, Phil & Rebillard, Éric. Pierre Batcheff and stardom in 1920s French cinema. Edinburgh University Press, 2009.
