= Medea Chakhava =

Georgian actress

- Born: May 15, 1921; Martvili, Georgia
- Died: September 7, 2009 (aged 88); Tbilisi, Georgia
- Education: Shota Rustaveli Theatre and Film University
- Occupation: film actress

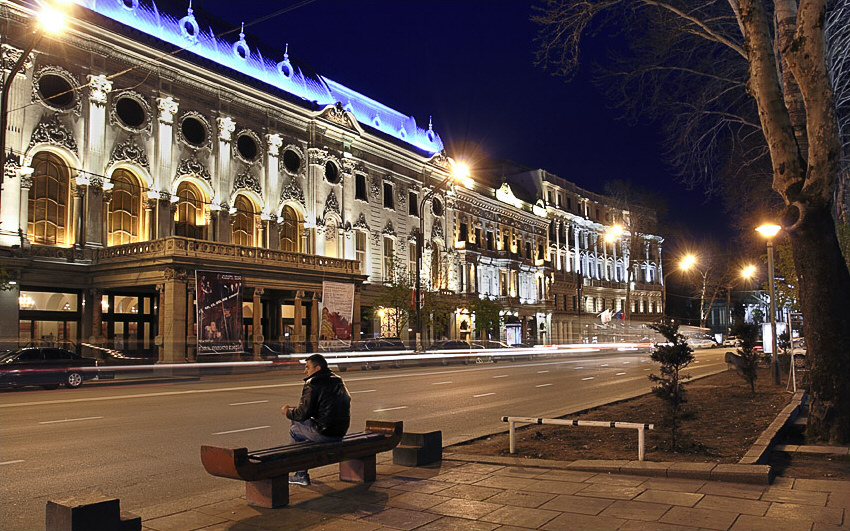
The Rustaveli Theatre where Chakhava made her debut in 1941.

Medea Chakhava (Georgian: მედეა ჩახავა; May 15, 1921 – September 7, 2009) was a Georgian theater and film actress.

== Career ==
Chakhava was born on May 15, 1921, in Martvili, Georgia. Her father was the Georgian doctor, Vasil Chakhava. Chakhava first appeared at the Rustaveli Theatre in 1941 and made her film debut in 1942. Chakhava later graduated from the State University of Theatre and Film in 1944. She joined the Rustaveli Theatre company in Tbilisi following her graduation.

Among the state awards bestowed on Chakhava during her career, which spanned both the Soviet Union and the independent Republic of Georgia, was the title of National Artist.

A star bearing her name was dedicated outside the Rustaveli Theatre in 2006.

Medea Chakhava died on September 7, 2009, at the age of 88.

== Awards ==
- People's Artist of the Georgian SSR (7 March 1960)
- Stalin Prize 3rd class (1951)
- Order of the Badge of Honor (17 April 1958)
- Medal "For Labour Valour" (10 November 1950)
