= Photography (film) =

1973 film

- Directed by: Pál Zolnay
- Written by: Miklós Köllő; Orsolya Székely; Pál Zolnay
- Produced by: Lajos Forgács
- Starring: István Iglódi
- Cinematography: Elemér Ragályi
- Release date: 8 February 1973
- Running time: 82 minutes
- Country: Hungary
- Language: Hungarian

Photography (Hungarian: Fotográfia) is a 1973 Hungarian drama film directed by Pál Zolnay. The film was entered into the 8th Moscow International Film Festival where it won the Silver Prize. Zolnay's film was also selected as the Hungarian entry for the Best Foreign Language Film at the 46th Academy Awards, but was not accepted as a nominee.

== Cast ==
- István Iglódi as retoucher, agent
- Ferenc Sebő as story singer
- Márk Zala as photographer

== See also ==
- List of submissions to the 46th Academy Awards for Best Foreign Language Film
- List of Hungarian submissions for the Academy Award for Best Foreign Language Film
