= Pál Zolnay =

Hungarian film director

- Born: 26 March 1928; Budapest, Hungary
- Died: 17 October 1995 (aged 67)
- Occupations: Film director Screenwriter; Actor
- Years active: 1962 – 1995

Pál Zolnay (26 March 1928 – 17 October 1995) was a Hungarian film director, screenwriter and actor. He directed eleven films between 1962 and 1995. His 1973 film Photography was entered into the 8th Moscow International Film Festival where it won the Silver Prize. He was married to actress Katalin Berek from 1959 to 1974, and their son János Zolnay was born in 1959.

== Selected filmography ==
- Photography (1973 - director)
- Diary for My Children (1984 - actor)
- Diary for My Lovers (1987 - actor)
