= Claude Tillier =

French novelist and pamphleteer

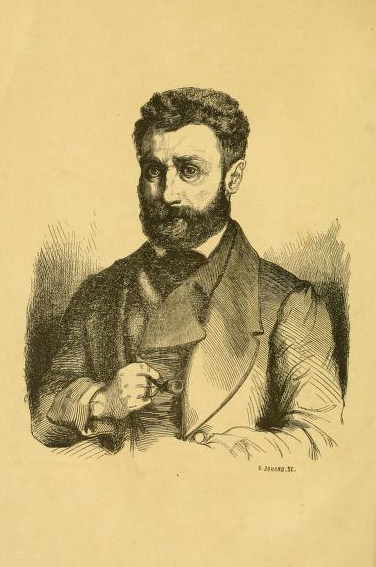
Œuvres de C. Tillier, tome premier, Sionest, Nevers, 1846

Claude Tillier (11 April 1801 in Clamecy – 12 October 1844 in Nevers) was a French novelist and pamphleteer.

== Life and work ==
Tiller was born in Clamecy in the family of an upper class locksmith. He studied in Bourges and later in Soissons and Paris with the help of a scholarship he got from Clamecy.

In 1821 he joined the army and took part in the French expedition in Spain, two years later he was promoted to non-commissioned officer. The result of his six years of service in the army is the memoir "Diary of the Spanish Expedition.

In 1827, he returned to his hometown, married and became a teacher. He became the principal of a public school but later opens a private school when he comes in to conflict with school he previously worked with. Quarrels with the authorities, which even brought him briefly in prison, and the reactionary consequences of the July Revolution led him to found the weekly newspaper L'Indépendant in 1831.

Tillier continued his activities as a private teacher until 1841. In June he left Clamecy to settle in Nevers where he became the editor of L'Association, a democratic newspaper published twice a week, until his death in May 1843.

In March 1842 Mon oncle Benjamin, his humorous-satirical novel was published in the Association, which became his most renowned work, initially in four part. The Parisian publisher Coquebert published a first book edition in 1843. The book has seen numerous editions and translations to this day. The first German translation was done by the democratically minded Swabian Ludwig Pfau in 1866. The anarchist Benjamin Tucker made an English translation.

From 1842 onwards, Tillier wrote numerous pamphlets until his death caused by tuberculosis, a disease which he carried from the time of his military service.

== Works ==
=== Completed novels ===
- Belle-Plante et Cornelius
- Mon oncle Benjamin

=== Collection of pamphlets ===
- Of things and others: twenty-four pamphlets, Nevers, C. Sionest, 1843, c. 670 p.
- Pamphlets (1840-1844) Critical edition published with introduction, historical notes and notes by Marius Gerin, Paris, A. Bertout, Nevers, Mazeron frères, 1906, 688 p.
- Paris, Éditions Jean-Jacques Pauvert, 1967, 175 p. Presentation, choice of texts, notes and index by Jean Guillon
