= Ipolite Khvichia =

- Ipolite Khvichia as Kukush in Mimino
- Born: Ipolite Khvichia; December 31, 1910; Kontuati, Georgia
- Died: February 1, 1985 (aged 74); Tbilisi, Georgia
- Occupation: Actor
- Years active: 1934-1983

Ipolite Khvichia (Georgian: იპოლიტე ხვიჩია; December 31, 1910 – February 1, 1985) was a Georgian actor and People's Artist of Georgia.

== Biography ==
In 1934 he graduated from Tbilisi Industrial-Economic College. In 1932-1936 he was an actor in Tsulukidze and Gegechkori regional theaters. Starring mainly in comedic roles: Quchara and Khariton (Polycarpe Kakabadze's "The Roaring Tulip", "The Marriage of Colmeurn"), Trufaldino and Marquis Floripopolis (Carlo Goldoni's "Servant of Two Masters", "Hotel Hostess"), Natsarkekia (Giorgi Nakhutsrishvili and Boris Gamrekeli's "Natsarkekia"), Kokhtaya (Avksenty Tsagareli's" Other times now") and others.

In 1937 he moved to Kutaisi Lado Meskhishvili Theater. From 1961 to 1966, he performed the roles of Shakro (Otar Mamphoria in "The Shadow of Metekhi") and Spiridon (Natalya Azyan's "The Last Masquerade") at the Shota Rustaveli Theater.

Since 1956 he starred in films.

He died in 1985. He is buried in the Saburtalo Pantheon of public figures in Tbilisi.

== Filmography ==
Year	Title	Role	Film Director
1956	Chveni Ezo	commandant	Revaz Chkheidze
1957	Young One from Sabudara	Almaskhani	Shota Managadze
1958	Manana	Ipolite Nemsadze	Zakaria Gudavadze, Shalva Martashvili
1959	Past Summer	holiday maker	Neli Nenova, Geno Tsulaia
1959	Last day, First day		Siko Dolidze
1960	Papa Gigia		Zakaria Gudavadze
1961	Ball and Field	Kuchkuchi	Karaman (Guguli) Mgeladze
1961	Treasure	Nikifore	Revaz Chkheidze
1962	Dolls Laugh	Meliton	Nikoloz Sanishvili
1962	Tkhunela	Sandro Koridze	Shalva Martishvili
1964	On the Road	hunter	Nana Mchedlidze
1965	Pierre Militia Officer	militia	David Rondeli
1965	Sorry, the death is awaiting you	Karamani Buskivadze	Karaman (Guguli) Mgeladze
1965	I See the Sun	Beglara	Lana Gogoberidze
1966	Meeting in the Mountains	Merab	Nikoloz Sanishvili
1966	Meeting the Past	Ipolite	Siko Dolidze
1967	My Friend Nodar	compère	David Rondeli
1967	Someone's Late on a Bus	Archil	Nana Mchedlidze
1967	Spring Will Come Soon		Otar Abesadze
1967	The City Wakes Up Early	Ipolite	Siko Dolidze
1968	Tariel Goula	Kazhina	Levan Khotivari
1968	Bzianeti		Liana Eliava
1968	Don't Grieve	Sandro	Giorgi Danelia
1968	Gangashi	Narimani	Nikoloz Sanishvili
1969	Smile Boys		Revaz Chkheidze
1969	Philatelist's Death	Shanatava	Giorgi Kalatozishvili
1970	The Star of My Town	Kaflani	Otar Abesadze
1970	Feola	Bondo Dolaberidze	Baadur Tsuladze
1970	The Gardens of Semiramida	Ipolite	Siko Dolidze
1971	Neighbors	Ipolite	Revaz Charkhalashvili
1971	Before dawn	Kolia	Karaman (Guguli) Mgeladze
1972	Funny Novel	Ipolite	Levan Khotivari
1974	Reflection		Otar Abesadze
1975	Wandering Knights		Temur Palavandishvili
1975	The First Swallow	Varlami	Nana Mchedlidze
1976	Like the Morning Fog"		Geno Khojava
1976	Namdvili tbiliselebi da skhvebi		Nana Mchedlidze
1977	Mimino	Kukush	Giorgi Danelia
1977	Gasoline Handler		Bidzina Chkheidze
1977	Racha, My Love	Silibistro	Joseph Medved
1978	Data Tutashkhia	Kazha Bulava	Grigol (Giga) Lortkipanidze, Guram (Gizo) Gabeskiria
1983	Someone Sits In The Fridge		Karaman (Guguli) Mgeladze

== Awards ==
- People's Artist of the Georgian SSR (1960)
