= Dudukhana Tserodze =

Georgian actress (1918–2000)

- დუდუხანა წეროძე
- Dudukhana Tserodze
- Born: 8 November 1918
- Died: 8 May 2000 (aged 81)
- Occupation: Actress
- Years active: 1934–1984

Dudukhana Platonovna Tserodze (Georgian: დუდუხანა წეროძე; 8 November 1918 – 8 May 2000) was a Georgian film and stage actress. She is best remembered for the title role in Magdana's Donkey (1955), and was named a People's Artist of the Georgian SSR in 1965.

== Career ==
Tserodze studied at the Tbilisi State Conservatoire and in 1938 graduated from the film school attached to the Georgian state film studio. From 1949 she was an actress at the Marjanishvili Theatre in Tbilisi, and from 1955 she worked at the Georgian Film Studio, appearing in some thirty films over a career of half a century.

Her best-known role was Magdana in Magdana's Donkey (1955), directed by Tengiz Abuladze and Revaz Chkheidze, which won the prize for best fiction short film at the 1956 Cannes Film Festival. Her other films include The Last Masquerade (1934), Our Courtyard (1956), I See the Sun (1965), Sergei Parajanov and Dodo Abashidze's The Legend of Suram Fortress (1984), and Kukaracha (1982).

== Awards and honours ==
- Honoured Artist of the Georgian SSR (1958)
- People's Artist of the Georgian SSR (1965)
- Order of Honour (1997)

== Death ==
Tserodze died on 8 May 2000.
