= Lika Kavzharadze =

მარიტა
- Lika Kavzharadze as Marita in The Wishing Tree (1976)
- Born: Lika Kavzharadze; October 26, 1959; Tbilisi, Georgian SSR, USSR
- Died: October 11, 2017 (aged 57); Tbilisi, Georgian
- Education: Tbilisi State Conservatoire
- Occupation: actress

Lika Kavzharadze (Georgian: ლიკა ქავჟარაძე, 26 October 1959 – 11 October 2017) was a Georgian film actress best known for her role in Tengiz Abuladze's 1976 drama film The Wishing Tree.

Born in Tbilisi, Kavzharadze was trained as a pianist at the Tbilisi State Conservatoire, from which she graduated in 1973. In 1972, she was invited by the Kartuli Pilmi studio and starred in several films, most notably as Marita in the award-winning The Wishing Tree directed by Tengiz Abuladze in 1976.

She was found dead, at age 57, at her own apartment in Tbilisi on 11 October 2017. Police officials said they were looking into possible suicide.

== Selected filmography ==
- Rotsa akvavda nushi (1972)
- Shadrevani (TV Short, 1972)
- Mshvenieri kostiumi (1973)
- Kavkasiuri romansi (1975)
- The Wishing Tree (1976)
- Pepela (1977)
- Satadarigo borbali (1977)
- Iveria, da sikvaruli (1978)
- Dyuma na Kavkaze (1980)
- Shekhvedramde, megobaro...(1980)
- Dmitry II (1982)
- Blue Mountains (1983)
- Ojakhi (1985)
- Argonavtebi (1986)
- Dakarguli saganzuris sadzebnelad (1987)
- Chidaobas ra unda (1988)
- Tskhovreba Don Kikhotisa da Sancho Panchosi (1988)
- Shemsrulebeli 977 (1989)
- Spirali (1990)
- The Sun of the Sleepless (1992)
- Oqros oboba (1992)
- Mkholod ertkhel (1994)
- Chakluli suli (1994)
- Die kaukasische Nacht (1998)
- Abandoned Don Juan (TV Short, 2000)
- 27 Dragons (TV Series, 2009)
- Medusa Gorgonas (2012)
- Muses of the Artist (2014)
