= Zaza Kolelishvili =

Georgian actor, film director and artist

- Born: January 11, 1957 (age 69); Telavi, Georgia
- Occupations: Actor, film director, artist
- Years active: 1976–present

Zaza Kolelishvili (Georgian: ზაზა კოლელიშვილი; born January 11, 1957, in Telavi, Georgia) is a Georgian film and television actor, film director and artist. He is best known for The Wishing Tree 1977, Garigeba and Kukaracha.

== Biography ==
He studied philology at the Tbilisi State University in 1997. Zaza studied acting at the Shota Rustaveli Theatre and Film University, the same University he studied directing in 1996. In 1981–1984, he worked at the Telavi State Theatre. In 1984–1991, he was working at the Rustaveli Theatre. Since 1985 Zaza has been working at film studio Kartuli Pilmi.

== Filmography ==
As actor

- 3+3 (2015)
- Paradox (2015)
- Garigeba 20 Tslis Shemdeg (2011)
- Street Days (Quchis dgeebi, 2010)
- Mediator (2008)
- Kukaracha (1982), Murtalo
- Isini (1992)
- Omi kvelastvis omia (1990)
- Mama, shvili da niavi (1988)
- Gamotskhadeba (1988)
- Khareba da Gogia (1987)
- Deduna (1987)
- Bravo, Alber Lolish (1987)
- Mamakatsebi (1985)
- Kvelaze stsrapebi msoplioshi (1985)
- Tu girtkamen – gaiqetsi (1984)
- Banditi aguris qarkhnidan (1983)
- Atovda zamtris bagebs (1983)
- The Wishing Tree (1977)
- Mimino (1977)
- Pyl pod solntsem (1977)

As director

- Garigeba 20 Tslis Shemdeg (2011)
- Omi da Qortsili (2010)
- Garigeba (1993)

As production Design

- Ori Khevsuri (2006)
- Kutaiseli Babua (2006)
