= The Plea (film) =

- ვედრება
- Directed by: Tengiz Abuladze
- Screenplay by: Tengiz Abuladze; Revaz Kveselava; Anzor Saluqvadze
- Story by: Vazha-Pshavela
- Based on: Host and Guest
- Produced by: Irakli Gotsiridze; Aleksandre Jagarbekovi; Tina Ochiauri
- Starring: Spartak Bagashvili
- Cinematography: Aleksandr Antipenko
- Edited by: Lusia Vartikyan
- Music by: Nodar Gabunia
- Production company: Kartuli filmi
- Release date: 1967
- Running time: 76 minutes
- Country: Soviet Union
- Languages: Georgian, Russian

The Plea (Georgian: ვედრება translit. Vedreba, Russian: Мольба, romanized: Molba) is a 1967 Soviet art drama film directed by Tengiz Abuladze and co-written with Revaz Kveselava and Anzor Saluqvadze. The film based on the poems of Vazha-Pshavela. It regarded as an influential classic and is an appreciated work of 20th century world cinema.

== Plot ==
Aluda from Khevsureti had killed Mutsali in the combat, but he forgave him and did not cut off his right hand. Therefore Aluda was banished from his community... Jokola got acquainted with Zviadauri when he was hunting. He hosted him and he offered him to stay for the night, but Kists noticed their enemy, they took away Jokola's guest and killed him on the Kist's grave. Jokola as a host didn't manage to keep Zviadauri safe, so he couldn't take the abusing and got killed by the enemies.

== Cast ==
- Tengiz Archvadze as Aluda
- Spartak Bagashvili as Ghvtisia
- Rusudan Kiknadze as Woman
- Ramaz Chkhikvadze as Matsili
- Otar Megvinetukhutsesi as Jokola
- Zurab Kapianidze as Zviadauri
- Nana Kavtaradze as Agaza
- Irakli Uchaneishvili as Musa
- Geidar Palavandishvili as Mutsali

== Awards ==
- San Remo International Film Festival - Grand Prize 1973
