= Vazha-Pshavela =

Georgian poet and writer

Vazha
- ვაჟა
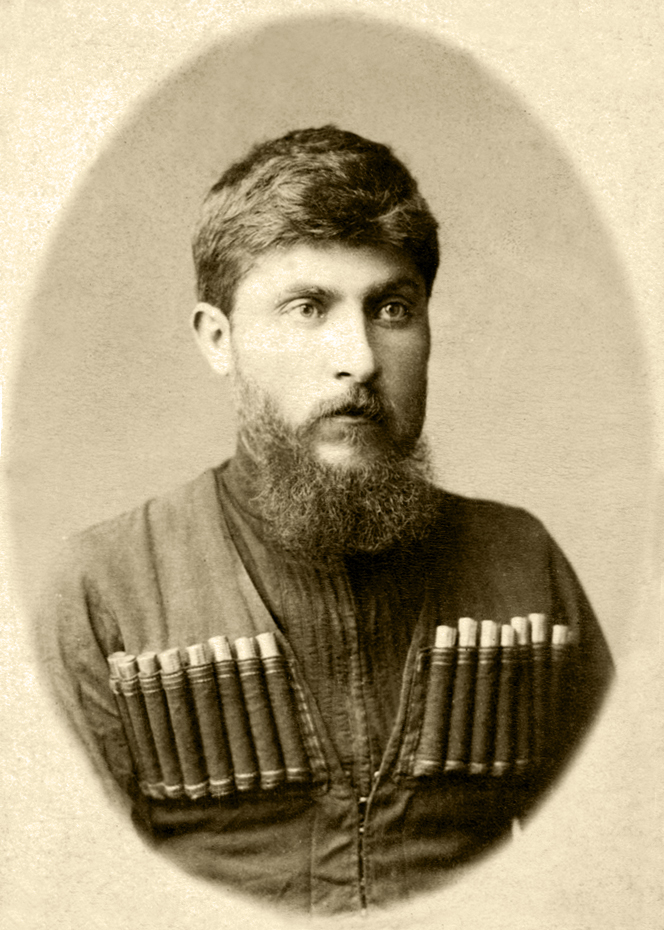
- Vazha in a chokha
- Born: Luka Razikashvili; 14 July 1861; Chargali, Tiflis Governorate, Russian Empire, now Georgia
- Died: 10 July 1915 (aged 53); Tbilisi, Georgia
- Resting place: Mtatsminda Pantheon
- Occupations: Poet, short-story writer, philosopher
- Spouse: Tamar Didebashvili
- Children: Levan; Tamar; Gulkhan; Vakhtang
- Writing career
- Genres: epic, drama, poetry
- Notable works: "Host and Guest" "Aluda Ketelauri" "Bakhtrioni"
- Literary movement: Modernism

Vazha-Pshavela (Georgian: ვაჟა-ფშაველა), simply referred to as Vazha (Georgian: ვაჟა) (14 July 1861 – 10 July 1915), is the pen name of the Georgian poet and writer Luk’a Razik’ashvili (Georgian: ლუკა რაზიკაშვილი).

== Life ==
Vazha-Pshavela was born into a family of clergymen in the small village of Chargali, situated in the mountainous Pshavi province of Eastern Georgia. His appreciation of nature and hunting was influenced by his uncle, Boygar Razikashvili, with allusions to him appearing in Vazha-Pshavela’s literary work. He graduated from the Pedagogical Seminary in Gori in 1882, where he closely associated with Georgian populists (Russian term narodniki). In 1883, he entered the Faculty of Law at St. Petersburg University (Russia) as a non-credit student but returned to Georgia in 1884 due to financial constraints. Upon returning, he worked as a teacher of the Georgian language and gained prominence as a notable representative of the National-Liberation movement of Georgia.

Vazha-Pshavela began his literary career in the mid-1880s. In his works, he depicted the everyday life and psychology of his contemporary Pshavs with remarkable insight. He authored numerous significant literary works, including 36 epics, around 400 poems ("Aluda Ketelauri", "Bakhtrioni", "Gogotur and Apshina", "Host and Guest", "The Snake-Eater", "Eteri", "Mindia", etc.), plays, stories, as well as literary criticism, journalism, and scholarly articles of ethnographic interest. Even in fiction, he portrayed the life of the Georgian highlander with near-ethnographic precision, encompassing an entire mythological worldview. In his poetry, he addressed the heroic past of his people and celebrated their struggle against both external and internal adversaries (poems "A Wounded Snow Leopard" (1890), "A Letter of a Pshav Soldier to His Mother" (1915), etc.).

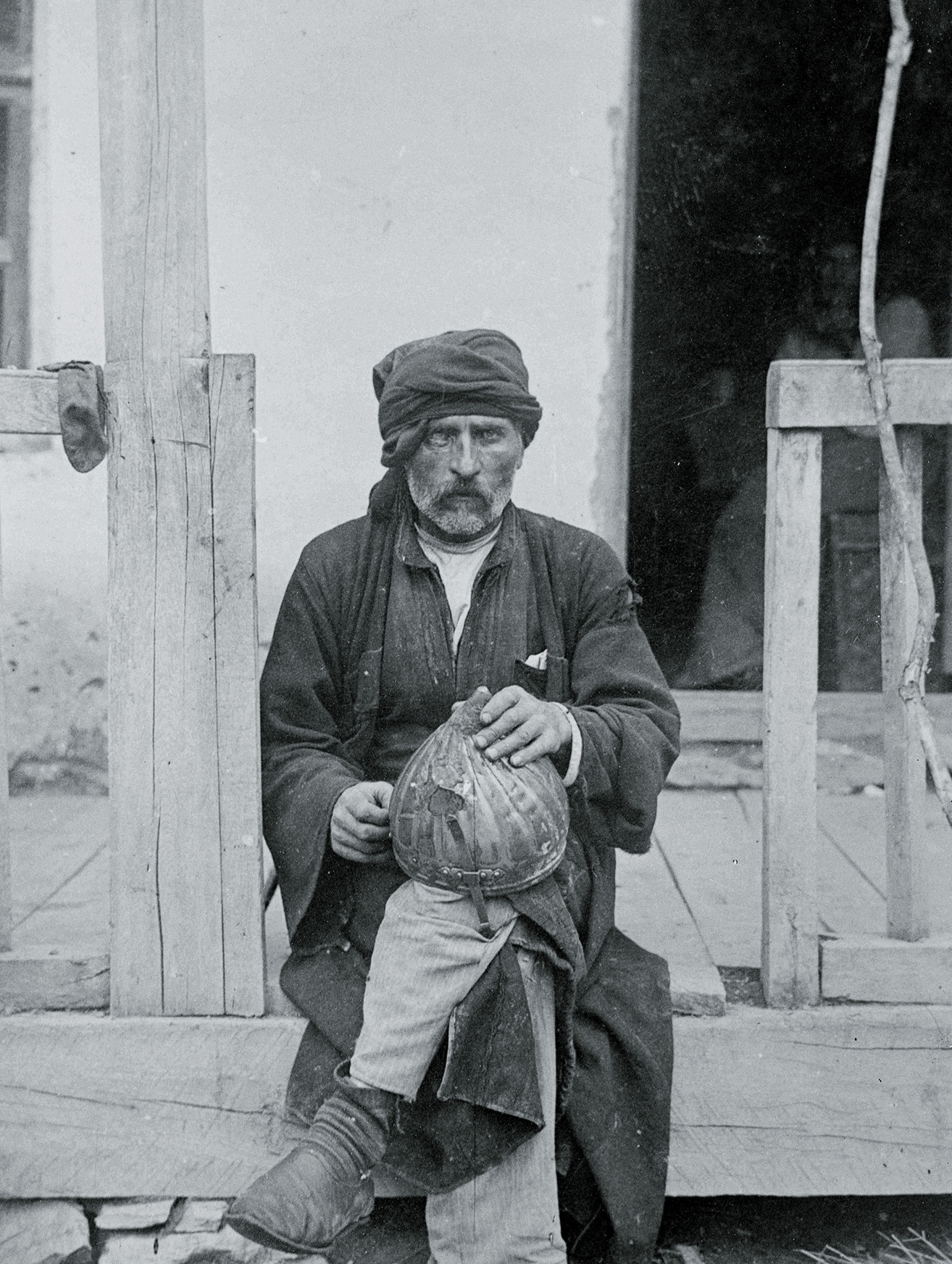
Vazha-Pshavela

In his finest epic works, Vazha-Pshavela explores the interactions of individuals with society, humanity with nature, and human love with love of country. The conflict between an individual and a temi (community) is central in the epics Aluda Ketelauri (1888, Russian translation 1935) and Guest and Host (1893, Russian translation 1935). In both works, the protagonists question and ultimately reject outdated communal laws in their personal journey toward a higher humanity that transcends parochial norms.

A recurring theme in Vazha-Pshavela’s work is the dignity and resilience of a strong-willed people, alongside their zeal for freedom. These ideas are further explored in the play The Rejected One (1894). He idealized the Pshavs’ traditional rituals, moral purity, and 'non-degeneracy', contrasting them with the values of what he considered a 'false civilization'. He asserted that "Every true patriot is cosmopolitan and every genuine cosmopolitan is a patriot".

In the epic Snake-Eater (1901, Russian translation 1934), the wise man Mindia dies because he cannot reconcile his ideals with the demands of his family and society. The central motif of Mindia consuming serpent’s flesh in an attempted suicide — which instead grants him occult knowledge — mirrors the folk tale motif found in The White Snake (Brothers Grimm), corresponding to tale type 673 in the Aarne-Thompson classification system.

The epic Bakhtrioni (1892, Russian translation 1943) recounts the role of the Georgian highland tribes in the uprising of Kakheti (East Georgia) against the Iranian oppressors in 1659.

Vazha-Pshavela also excelled in portraying Nature in Georgian poetry, expressing his profound love through vivid and dynamic landscapes imbued with tension and internal conflict. His poetic language, rich in the nuances of Georgian, achieves remarkable precision. Through translations into Russian (by Nikolay Zabolotsky, V. Derzhavin, Osip Mandelshtam, Boris Pasternak, S. Spassky, Marina Tsvetaeva, and others), English (by Donald Rayfield, Venera Urushadze, Lela Jgerenaia, Nino Ramishvili, and others), French (by Gaston Bouatchidzé), and German (by Yolanda Marchev, Steffi Chotiwari-Jünger), his works have reached an international audience. To date, his poems and narratives have been published in more than 20 languages.

Vazha-Pshavela died in Tiflis on 10 July 1915 and was buried in the ancient capital of his native land. He received the honor of interment in the prestigious Pantheon of Mtatsminda Mountain in recognition of both his literary achievements and his role in Georgia's National Liberation movement.

As Donald Rayfield writes, the mountaineer poet Vazha-Pshavela is "qualitatively of a greater magnitude than any other Georgian writer".

The five epic poems of Vazha-Pshavela ("Aluda Ketelauri" (1888), "Bakhtrioni" (1892), "Host and Guest" (1893), "The Avenger of the Blood" (1897), and "The Snake-Eater" (1901)) are structured according to the Golden ratio, inviting comparison with works by Ancient and Renaissance authors inspired by similar principles.

In 1961, a museum and memorial were established in Chargali to honor Vazha-Pshavela, the village’s most famous son.

== Works ==
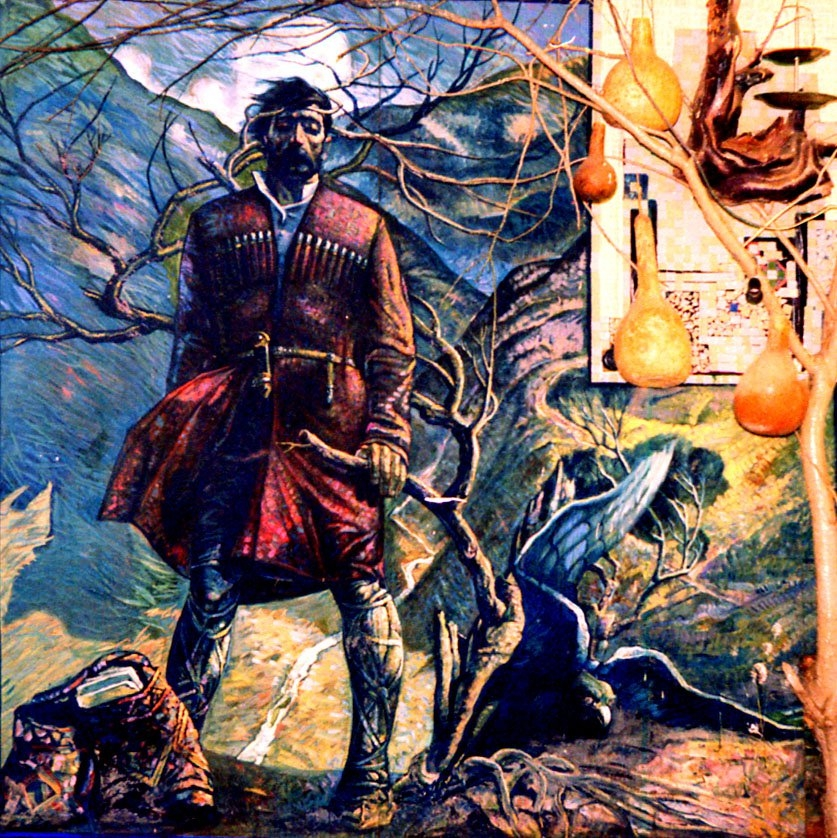
Vazha by Guram Gagoshidze.

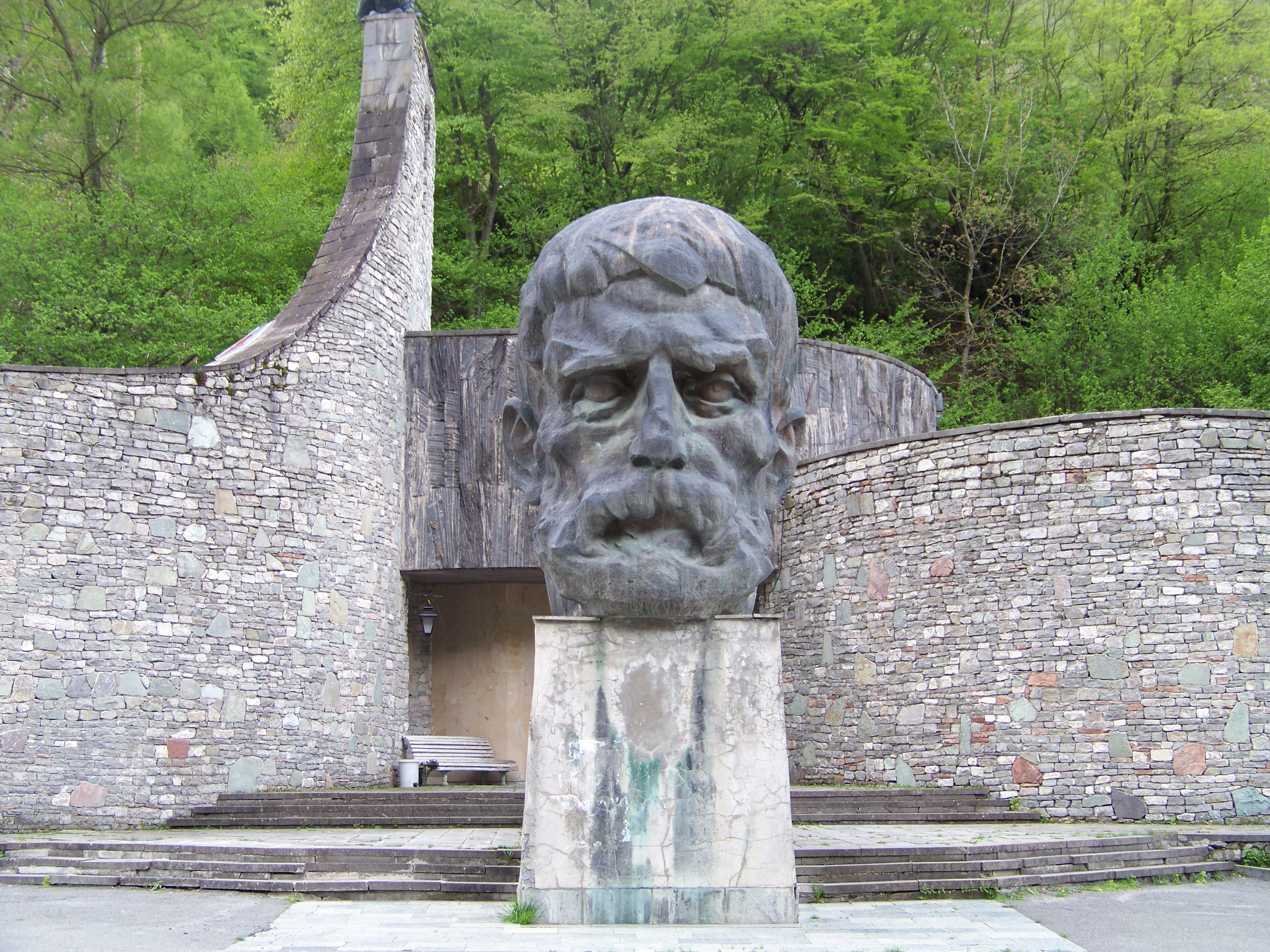
Vazha-Pshavela memorial at his biographical museum in Chargali, Georgia.

=== Selected Epic Poems ===
- Gogotur and Apshina, 1887
- Aluda Ketelauri, 1888
- Bakhtrioni (poem), 1892
- Host and Guest, 1893
- The Snake-eater, 1901

=== Other Selected Poems ===
- A Feast, 1886
- The Ogre's Wedding, 1886
- The Eagle, 1887
- I Was in the Mountains, 1890
- The Rock and the River, 1899
- I Gaze at the Mountains, 1899
- Orphaned Fledglings, 1899
- A Goldfinger's Will, 1891
- A Night in the Highland, 1890
- To the Mountains, 1920

=== Selected Short Stories ===
- The Story of the Roebuck, 1883
- An Old Beech, 1889
- The Mountain's Height, 1895
- Mousetrap, 1908

=== Plays (theatre) ===
- The Scene in the Mountain, 1889
- Hunted of the Homeland (drama), 1894
- The Forest Comedy, 1925

== Movies ==
- Vedreba (The encounter), romantic drama, adapted from the Vazha-Pshavela poems "Aluda Ketelauri" and "Host and Guest", (this movie was awarded the Grand Prix at the 17th San Remo international Festival of Author Films, 1974), the film director Tengiz Abuladze – 1967
- Mokvetili, romantic drama, adapted from the Vazha-Pshavela play Hunted of the homeland, the film director Giorgi (Gia) Mataradze – 1992
- "Host and Guest" Dramatic adaptation of Vazha-Pshavela's epic poem of the same name, devised by Synetic Theater (Arlington, Virginia) – USA – directed by Paata Tsikurishvili – 2002
