= Takaishvili =

Takaishvili (Georgian: თაყაიშვილი) is a Georgian patronymic surname. Notable people with the surname include:

- Ekvtime Takaishvili (1863–1953), Georgian historian and saint
- Sesilia Takaishvili (1906–1984), Georgian actress
