= Young One from Sabudara =

1958 Soviet film

- Russian: Последний из Сабудара
- Directed by: Shota Managadze
- Written by: Giorgi Mdivani
- Produced by: Grigol Svaneli
- Starring: Bela Mirianashvili; Imedo Kakhiani; Givi Tokhadze; Sesilia Takaishvili; Meri Kandelaki
- Cinematography: Giorgi Chelidze
- Music by: Rezo Lagidze
- Release date: 1958
- Country: Soviet Union
- Language: Russian

Young One from Sabudara (Russian: Последний из Сабудара) is a 1958 Soviet romantic comedy film directed by Shota Managadze.

== Plot ==
Almost all the inhabitants of the village of Sabudara moved to the city, but the Kvernadze family wants to stay in their native lands. One guy from this family learns that his lover's family decides to leave and he leaves home...

== Cast ==
- Bela Mirianashvili as Tebrole
- Imedo Kakhiani as Gogita
- Givi Tokhadze as Ushangi
- Sesilia Takaishvili as Elpite
- Meri Kandelaki as Nino (as M. Kandelaki)
- Grigol Tkabladze as Sachino
- Ipolite Khvichia as Almaskhani
- Zurab Laperadze as Giorgi (as Zura Laperadze)
- Nodar Mgaloblishvili
