= Givi Berikashvili =

Georgian actor (1933–2017)

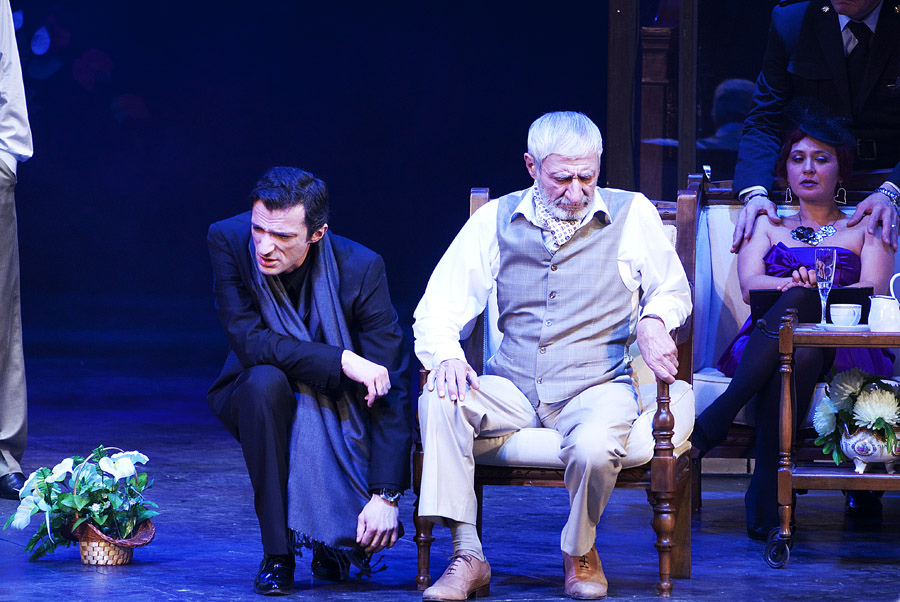
- Berikashvili, seated in a chair, with his son Zurab on stage in 2010
- Born: May 15, 1933; Kolagi, Georgian SSR, USSR
- Died: April 10, 2017 (aged 83); Tbilisi, Georgia
- Education: Shota Rustaveli Theatre and Film University
- Occupation: Actor
- Years active: 1966-2009
- Awards: Shota Rustaveli Prize, People's Artist of the Georgian SSR

Givi Berikashvili (Georgian: გივი ბერიკაშვილი; 15 May 1933 – 10 April 2017) was a Georgian film and theatre actor.

Born in the village of Kolagi, now part of the Gurjaani Municipality, Berikashvili graduated from the Georgian Institute of Theatre in 1956. He subsequently performed at the Drama Theatre of Rustavi, the Drama Theatre of Sukhumi, and finally at the Marjanishvili Theatre in Tbilisi. His notable films include: Londre, Wine Thieves, The Wishing Tree, Data Tutashkhia, Everyone Wants to Love, The Turtledoves of Paradise, and others. Among his many accolades are the title of People's Artist of Georgia (1979) and the Shota Rustaveli Prize. He died of respiratory failure in 2017 and was buried at the Saburtalo Church of the Ascension in Tbilisi.
