= Chokheli =

Chokheli is a surname. Notable people with the surname include:

- Givi Chokheli (1937–1994), Georgian footballer
- Goderdzi Chokheli (1954–2007), Georgian novelist
