= Karlo Sakandelidze =

Georgian actor (1928–2010)

- Born: April 1, 1928; Bzvani, Georgia
- Died: October 29, 2010 (aged 82); Tbilisi, Georgia
- Occupation: Actor
- Years active: 1955–2003

Karlo Sakandelidze (Georgian: კარლო საკანდელიძე; April 1, 1928 – October 29, 2010) was a Georgian film and theatre actor.

Sakandelidze was born in Bzvani, Georgia. He was an actor with the Rustaveli Theatre. Sakandelidze's Important roles included Gogia (Losve Story), Gio (Tariel Golua), Osiko Kharebadze (The Autumn Nobles) Kuchara (Kvarkvare Tutaberi), Toshek (Such a Love), Chinchraka (Chinchraka), Butkhuza (The Old Pipers), Aristo Kvashavadze (The Stepmother of Samanaishvili), Peasant and Husband (The Caucasian Chalk Circle), Catesby (Richard III), and Scrooge in (Christmas Dream).

Karlo Sakandelidze also acted in films. His first film was Magdanas Lurja (1955), directed by Tengiz Abuladze and Rezo Chkheidze, where he played the role of Vano. This film received a Golden Palm at the Cannes film festival, for the best fiction film-short. Another important role for Sakandelidze was in the movie Data Tutashkhia, in which he played Nikandro Qiria.

He died in Tbilisi.
