= Magdana's Donkey =

- Directed by: Rezo Chkheidze, Tengiz Abuladze
- Screenplay by: Carlo Gogodze
- Story by: Ekaterine Gabashvili
- Starring: Dudukhana Tserodze, Akaki Kvantaliani
- Cinematography: Alexander Digmelov
- Edited by: Vasil Dolenko
- Music by: Archil Kereselidze
- Production company: Kartuli filmi
- Release date: 1955
- Running time: 67 minutes
- Country: Soviet Union
- Languages: Georgian, Russian

Magdana's Donkey (Georgian: მაგდანას ლურჯა, Russian: Лурджа Магданы, romanized: Lurja magdani) is a 1955 Soviet-Georgian black-and-white social-themed drama film co-directed by Revaz Chkheidze and Tengiz Abuladze based on a short story of the same name by Ekaterine Gabashvili.

== Plot ==
In a small Georgian village at the beginning of the 20th century, Magdana Sesiashvili, a widow, struggles to support her three children, Sopo, Mikho, and Kato, by selling yogurt in the city. One day, the children discover a sick, abandoned donkey on the road and, nursing it back to health, they name it Lurja (meaning "Blue-eyed"). With Lurja's help, the family's fortunes begin to improve as the donkey becomes an invaluable assistant in their small business.

However, their newfound happiness is short-lived. The donkey's former owner, a wealthy coal merchant named Mitu, recognizes it in the city and decides he wants it back. Mitu, having abandoned the donkey earlier, bribes the court, and through this underhanded tactic, he forces Magdana to surrender Lurja, taking away the family's source of hope and assistance.

== Production ==
This film was the debut feature of Tengiz Abuladze and Revaz Chkheidze. Magdana's Donkey was acclaimed as the start of a “new wave” in Soviet cinema.

The leading role (Magdana) was played by Georgian actress Dudukhana Tserodze. The film won the Best Fiction Short award at the 1956 Cannes Film Festival.

== Cast ==
- Dudukhana Tserodze as Magdana
- L. Moistsrapishvili as Sopo (Magdana's older daughter)
- Mikho Borashvili as Mikho (Magdana's boy)
- Nani Chikvinidze as Kato (Magdana's younger daughter)
- Akaki Kvantaliani as Mitua
- Karlo Sakandelidze as Vano
- Akaki Vasadze as Village Foreman/Landlord
- Aleksandre Omiadze as Gigo (Magdana's Father)
- Aleksandre Takaishvili as Judge

== Prizes and awards ==
- Prix du film de fiction - court métrage - 1956 Cannes Film Festival
- Special prize in Edinburgh International Film Festival (1956)
