= Levan Uchaneishvili =

Georgian actor (born 1958)

- Born: Levan Karlovich Uchaneishvili; December 15, 1958 (age 67); Tbilisi, Georgia
- Education: Tbilisi High School, Shota Rustaveli Theater and Film University
- Occupation: Actor
- Years active: 1979–present

Levan Uchaneishvili, also known as Levani (Georgian: ლევან უჩანეიშვილი; born December 15, 1958), is a Georgian actor, screenwriter and director best known for playing the title character in the 1982 Georgian movie Kukaracha.

== Biography ==
=== Early life ===
He was born on December 15, 1958 in Tbilisi, then part of the Georgian SSR in the Soviet Union. In 1979, he graduated from Tbilisi High School. Since 1976, he approached on the Shota Rustaveli Theatre and Film University and he has been shooting in the cinema, and since 1979 he has been an actor of the film studio "Georgian Film".

=== 1980s: Early film roles and Kukaracha ===
His first film role was in the 1980 movie House on Lesnaya Street (Дом на Лесной) where he played an underground printing house worker. In 1982 he played the title character in Kukaracha. His performance was highly praised and considered his most iconic performance. Ilene Kahn, the producer of the HBO film Stalin, considered him as the "Kevin Costner of Georgia". In 1985 he played Zurab in the art film The Legend of the Suram Fortress.

=== 1990s and 2000s: Worldwide approach ===
Since the 90s, he has been living and working in the United States. One of his first roles was the 1992 HBO TV movie Stalin where he played Soviet politician Lazar Kaganovich. Ilene Kahn loved Levani's performance on Kukaracha and decided to cast him as Lazar. Some of his notable American film roles include Independence Day (1996), Air Force One (1997), Blade (1998), Virus and Wishmaster 2: Evil Never Dies (both 1999), and 25th Hour (2002). In addition to his film work, Uchaneishvili has appeared in various television series, including episodes of The X-Files, JAG and Fastlane.
