= Spartak Bagashvili =

Georgian actor

- Born: 7 December 1914; Tbilisi, Russian Empire
- Died: 1 February 1977 (aged 62); Tbilisi, Georgian SSR, Soviet Union
- Occupation: Actor
- Years active: 1937-1975

Spartak Bagashvili (Georgian: სპარტაკ ბაღაშვილი; 7 December 1914 - 1 February 1977) was a Soviet and Georgian actor. He appeared in more than twenty films from 1937 to 1975. He received a variety of honors, including the title People's Artist of the Georgian SSR.

== Selected filmography ==
Year	Title	Role	Notes
1942	Giorgi Saakadze		
1963	The White Caravan		
1965	Shadows of Forgotten Ancestors		
1967	The Plea		
1968	The Color of Pomegranates		
1969	Pirosmani		

== Awards ==
- Stalin Prize 1st class (1941)
- People's Artist of the Georgian SSR (1963)
- Two Order of the Red Banner of Labour (1 April 1938 and 6 March 1950)
