= Levan Razikashvili =

Levan Razikashvili (Georgian: ლევან რაზიკაშვილი) (1895 – 1923) was a Georgian police officer and victim of Soviet repressions.

He was born into the family of the Georgian poet Luka Razikashvili, better known by his pseudonym Vazha-Pshavela. Razikashvili graduated from the Tbilisi Gymnasium for Nobility and joined the Social-Federalist Party during the Russian Revolution of 1917. Later, he served to the short-lived Democratic Republic of Georgia (1918–1924). After the Soviet takeover of Georgia in 1921, he was appointed a militsiya chief in the Pshavi district, which was a scene of an anti-Soviet guerrilla revolt. Razikashvili was suspected by the Bolshevik government to have sympathized with the insurgents who were led by Kakutsa Cholokashvili, Razikashvili's erstwhile friend. After the rebel leaders managed to escape into Chechnya in September 1922, Razikashvili was arrested on the charges of "participation in banditism." A group of Georgian writers attempted a mediation and urged the Soviet official Sergo Ordzhonikidze to prevent the son of Vazha-Pshavela from being executed, but to no avail. Ordzhonikidze replied to the mediators: "If it were Vazha-Pshavela himself, I would shoot him too". Razikashvili was shot by the Cheka in February 1923.

== See also ==
- August Uprising
