= Me, Grandma, Iliko and Ilarion =

Me, Grandma, Iliko and Ilarioni
- Directed by: Tengiz Abuladze
- Screenplay by: Tengiz Abuladze, Nodar Dumbadze
- Based on: Me, Grandma, Iliko and Ilarion by Nodar Dumbadze
- Narrated by: Soso Ordjonikidze
- Edited by: Vasil Dolenko
- Music by: Archil Kereselidze, Nugzar Vatsadze
- Production company: Kartuli filmi
- Release date: 1962
- Running time: 90 minutes
- Country: Soviet Union
- Languages: Georgian, Russian

Me, Grandma, Iliko and Ilarioni (Georgian: მე, ბებია, ილიკო და ილარიონი translit. Me, bebia, iliko da ilarioni, Russian: Я, бабушка, Илико и Илларион, romanized: Ia, Babushka, iliko i ilarion) is a 1962 Soviet black-and-white social-themed romantic comedy film directed by Tengiz Abuladze based on a novel of same name by Nodar Dumbadze.

== Cast ==
- Soso Ordjonikidze
- Sesilia Takaishvili
- Aleqsandre Jorjoliani
- Grigol Tkabladze
- Manana Abazadze
- Kira Andronikashvili
- Tengiz Daushvili
- Ioseb Gogichaishvili
- Shalva Kherkheulidze
- Aleqsandre Gomelauri
