= The Wishing Tree (1976 film) =

- Directed by: Tengiz Abuladze
- Written by: Revaz Inanishvili; Tengiz Abuladze
- Starring: Lika Kavzharadze; Soso Jachvliani
- Cinematography: Lomer Akhvlediani
- Music by: Bidzina Kvernadze; Iakob Bobokhidze
- Production company: Georgian Film Studio
- Distributed by: Cannon Film (US theatrical); Ruscico (DVD)
- Release date: December 1976
- Running time: 107 minutes
- Country: Soviet Union (Georgian SSR)
- Languages: Georgian, Russian

The Wishing Tree (Georgian: ნატვრის ხე, Natvris Khe, Russian: Древо желания, romanized: Drevo Zhelania) is a 1976 Georgian drama film directed by Tengiz Abuladze. It won the Lenin Prize, the All-Union Film Festival main prize and other prizes. The film is based on Giorgi Leonidze's short stories.

The textures of folk legend and striking visual allegory permeate The Wishing Tree, an episodic pastorale set in a pre-revolutionary Georgian village and spanning four seasons in the lives of various village characters. Some twenty-two stories are woven into the narrative, which centers on a beautiful young woman who is forced to marry a man she does not love; her unsanctioned love for another leads her to ritual disgrace and sacrifice.

== Plot ==
The film is based on the novellas of Giorgi Leonidze and depicts pre-revolutionary life in a Georgian village. The central storyline follows the return of a young woman, Marita, to the village, where she falls in love with a poor villager named Gedia. However, Marita's relatives and the village elder decide to marry her off against her will to a wealthy villager.

Gedia returns to Marita, and they reunite, but their meeting is discovered by her husband’s relatives. Under the direction of the village elder, Marita is publicly humiliated: she is paraded through the village backward on a donkey and pelted with mud. The film ends tragically with the deaths of the lovers.

The film also emphasizes the interior of Georgian pre-revolutionary homes and the unhurried rhythm of rural life. Vivid characters include the village eccentrics: "aristocrat" Fufala and "philosopher" Bumbula, who are mocked by the local boys. The title of the film comes from another holy fool, Elioz, who wanders the snowy forest in vain, searching for the magical “Tree of Desire.”

== Cast ==
- Lika Kavzharadze as Marita
- Soso Jachvliani as Gedia
- Zaza Kolelishvili as Shete
- Kote Daushvili as Tsitsikore
- Sofiko Chiaureli as Pupala
- Kakhi Kavsadze as Rebel Ioram
- Otar Megvinetukhutsesi as Elioz
- Erosi Manjgaladze as Bumbula
- Ramaz Chkhikvadze as Priest Okhrokhine
- Gogi Gegechkori as Chachika
- Sesilia Takaishvili as Maradia
- Giorgi Khobua as Batula
- Givi Berikashvili as Padghula
- Jemal Ghaghanidze as Taghria
- Boris Tsipuria as Koria
- Ia Khobua as Mother of Gedia
- Temina Tuaeva as Nargiza
- Dato Papuashvili as Azaria
- Givi Chichinadze as Ipro
- Dato Abashidze as Gaulatsune
- Tina Burbutashvili as Mother of Shete
- Shota Skhirtladze as Herder

== Music ==
The film score is composed by Georgian composers Bidzina Kvernadze and Iakob Bobokhidze.

== Awards ==
The film won several film festival prizes.

Year	Prize
1977	Main prize of All-Union Film Festival
1977	Golden aurochs at VI Film festival in Tehran
1978	Special prize at Karlovy Vary International Film Festival
1979	Shota Rustaveli Prize
1979	David di Donatello for Best Foreign Film
1988	Lenin Prize for Tengiz Abuladze
