= Host and Guest =

1893 epic poem by Vazha-Pshavela

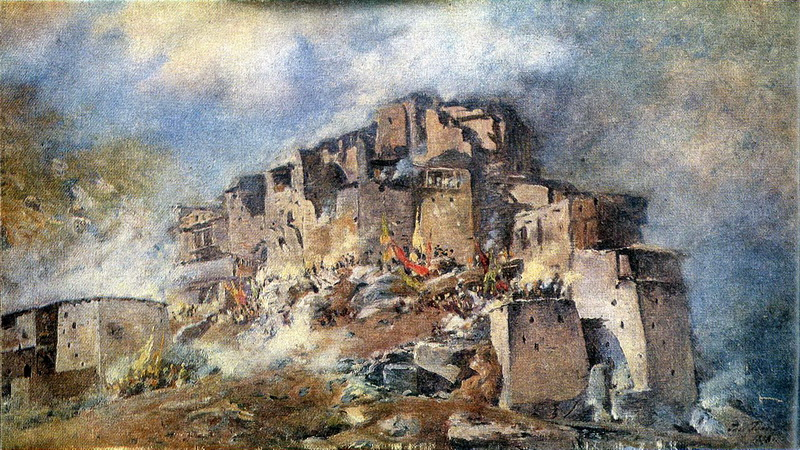
- Author: Vazha-Pshavela
- Original title: სტუმარ-მასპინძელი
- Language: Georgian
- Genre: Epic poem
- Publication date: 1893

Host and Guest (Georgian: სტუმარ-მასპინძელი, St’umar-Masp’indzeli) is an epic poem by the Georgian poet, writer and philosopher Vazha-Pshavela. The poem was first published in 1893 in Tbilisi, and it is considered to be the "masterpiece of the Georgian literature". It is compulsory reading in Georgian schools. A film based on the poem was made in 1967 by Tengiz Abuladze.

== Content ==
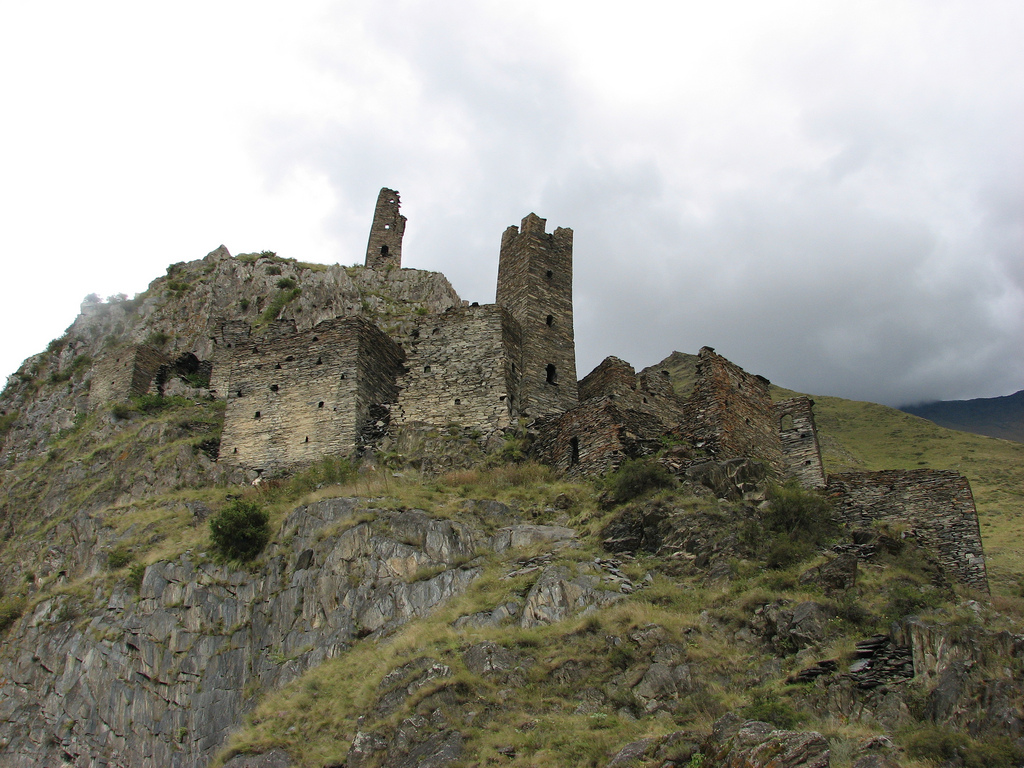
Khevsurian Village

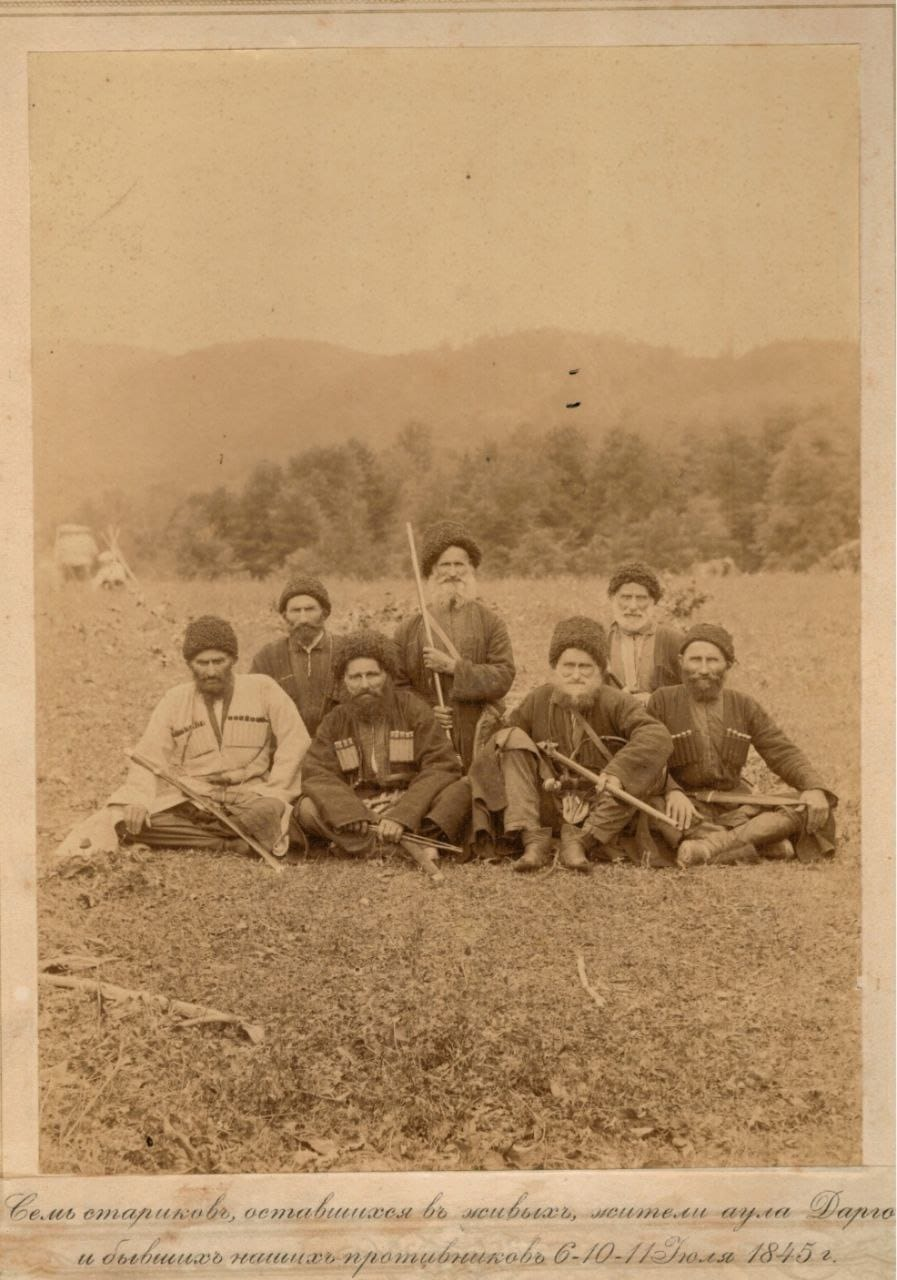
Kist people

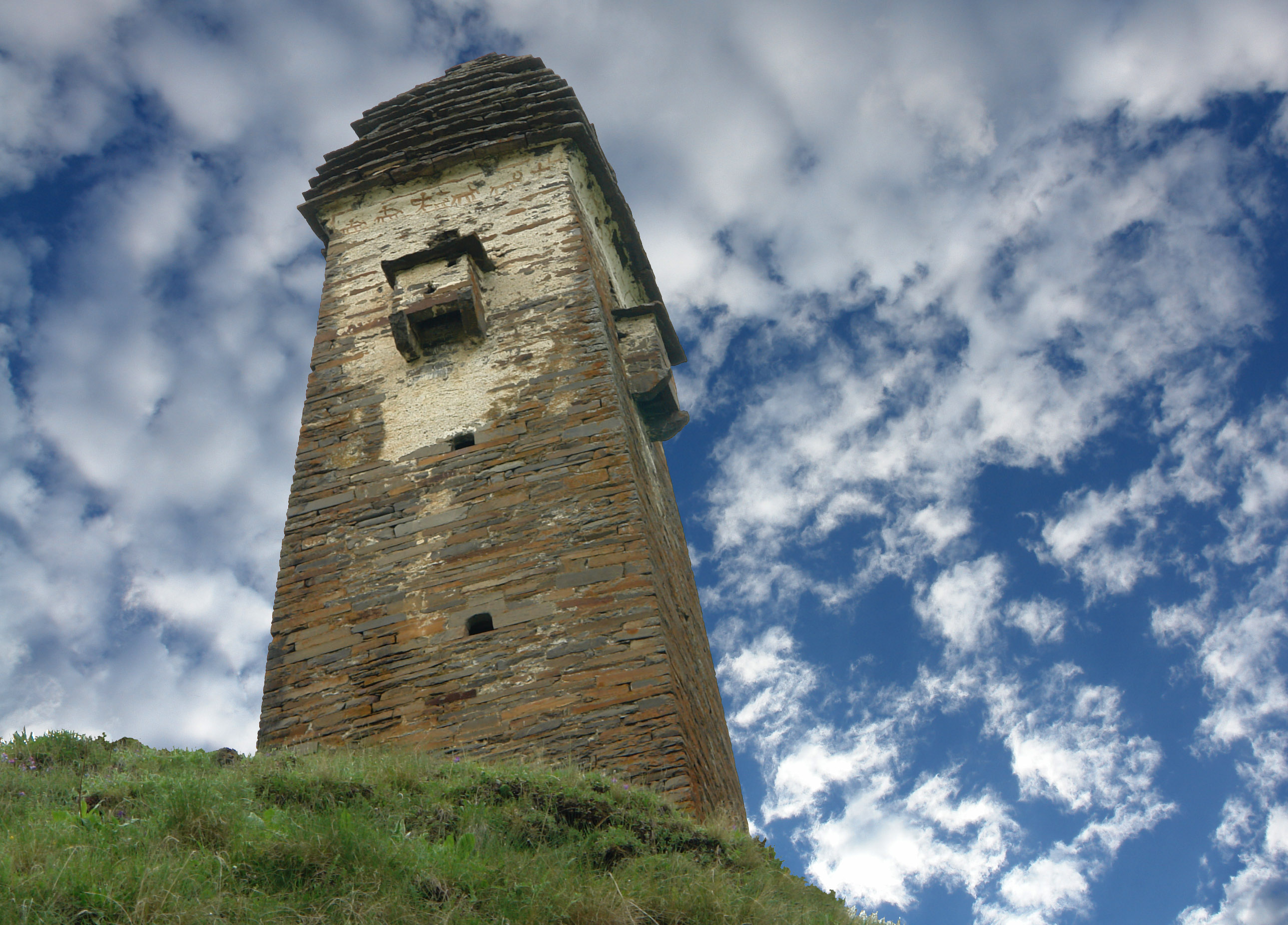
Khevsurian Fortress

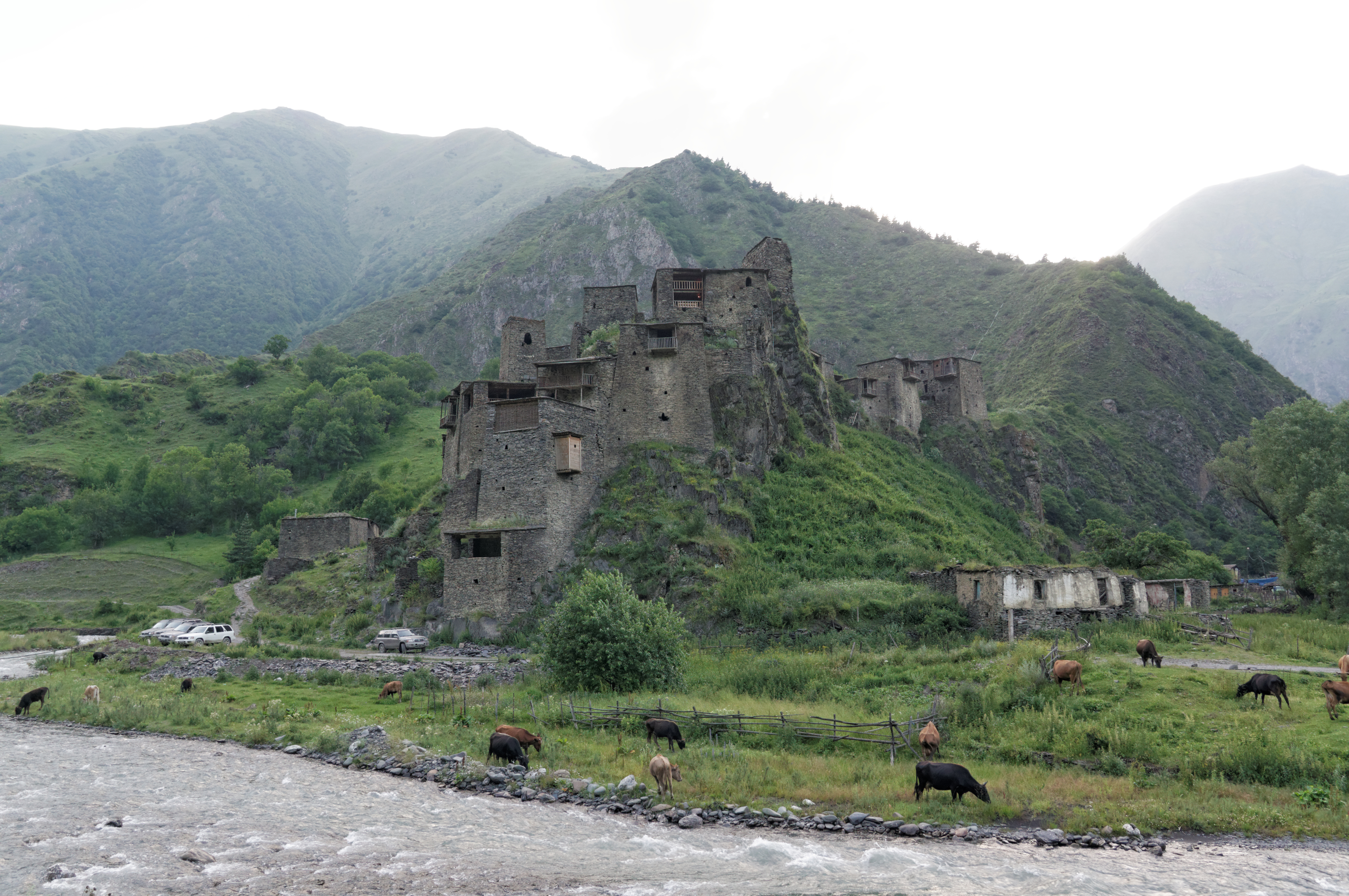
Khevsurian Village

Though the host, Joqola, is Muslim, and his guest, Zviadauri, is Christian, the poem refers only very vaguely to their differing religious and cultural traditions. It is more about the intertwining of their fates – and the great dignity with which they face their inevitable ends – once they've tripped the wire of their communities' savage, mutual loathing.

Joqola and Zviadauri meet by accident in a damp forest – the ensemble, holding treelike poles and swaying in shadow to a sad mountain melody, remains one of Synetic's most mystical images – where both are hunting for deer. These are men who value action over words, so the clipped exchanges Reed writes for them convey an earthy stoicism. After Joqola invites his new companion to his home, to gut and celebrate their kill, their joy is evoked in a virile, ritualized dance.

In the manner of all kinds of knee-jerk vengefulness, things quickly fall apart for them and Joqola's wife, Aghaza. The village, outraged at Joqola's flouting of the taboo against giving comfort to the enemy, rally around the rabble-rousing elder Musa, who demands that Joqola turn over his guest to them. The dissident Joqola, however, citing the revered local mandate for civility and hospitality – "The guest", he recites, "will be the last to die" – refuses. So the fuse is lighted.

The descent into calamity is orchestrated with a paradoxical beauty. From a sacrifice conducted in the village cemetery to the outfitting of combatants in the rival village, each stylized sequence builds hypnotically on the one before. Drumbeats and ethereal recorded voices further cement the tension.

== Text and translations ==
This poem is translated into several languages, including: English (by Donald Rayfield, Venera Urushadze, Lela Jgerenaia, Nino Ramishvili, and others), French (by Gaston Bouatchidzé), Russian (by Nikolay Zabolotsky, V. Derzhavin, Osip Mandelshtam, Boris Pasternak, S. Spassky, Marina Tsvetaeva, and others), German, Spanish, Italian, Japanese and other languages.

The poem begins:

ღამის წყვდიადში ჩაფლული,
გამტკნარებულის სახითა,
მოსჩანს ქისტეთის მიდამო
სალის კლდეების ტახტითა.
ბნელს ხევზე მოჰყეფს მდინარე,
გულამღვრეული ჯავრითა.
გადმოხრილიყვნენ მთანიცა,
ხელ-პირს იბანდენ წყალზედა;

Translation:

Veiled in the gloom of night
The sweet face of Kisteti
Appears, among hills around,
A rocky throne among cliffs.
The river moans in its dark ravine
Turbid, with grief at its heart.
The mountains too are bowed down,
Laving face and hands in the water;

— Translation by Lela Jgerenaia

The poem ends:

ზედ აწევს ჯადოსავითა,
არ დაიმტვრევა კვერითა,
ვერც შეულოცავს მლოცავი,
არც აიხდება ხელითა.
მხოლოდ მდინარის ხმა ისმის,
დაბლა მიქანავს ხველითა
და უფსკრულს დასცქერს პირიმზე
მოღერებულის ყელითა…

Translation:

It shrouds it like an enchantment,
No weapon can pierce it,
No prayer can charm it away,
Nor any hand remove it.
Only the river's noise is heard,
Raging downwards, roaring,
While beauty stares into its depths
Her neck bent, gracefully…

— Translation by Lela Jgerenaia

=== Full text ===
See this for English translation by Lela Jgerenaia: Vazha-Pshavela (1861–1915) - Host and Guest

== Film adaptations ==
The first film version of the poem as a feature was produced in 1967. The film version made by Tengiz Abuladze in 1967 was his great cinematic success in Georgia.

== See also ==
- Kist people
- Khevsurians
- 1893 in poetry
