= Kukaracha =

- Directed by: Siko Dolidze; Keti Dolidze
- Written by: Nodar Dumbadze
- Based on: On story of Nodar Dumbadze "Kukaracha"
- Starring: Levan Uchaneishvili (Kukaracha); Nineli Chankvetadze (Inga); Zaza Kolelishvili (Murtalo); Mari Janashia (Aniko); Lado Tatishvili; Givi Tokhadze; Dudukhana Tserodze; Lia Kapanadze; Tamaz Toloraia; Bondo Goginava; Grigol Tsitaishvili; Ketevan Esaiashvili; Omar Gabelia; Iamze Tkavadze; Jimi Devnozashvili; Dato Kublashvili; Mikheil Kozakov; D. Nafetvaridze; D. Tsetskhladze; L. Lomsadze; Ketevan Murvanidze; Akaki Berdzenishvili; B. Berdzenishvili; Anzor Urdia; Nodar Sulemanashvili; L. Sulemanashvili; Platon Koiava
- Production company: Georgian film
- Release date: 1982
- Running time: 89 minute
- Country: Soviet Union
- Languages: Russian, Georgian

Kukaracha (or Cucaracha; Georgian: კუკარაჩა) is a 1982 Soviet film directed by Siko Dolidze and Keti Dolidze. It is based on a story by Nodar Dumbadze

== Plot ==
Kukaracha was a trustee of the police in one of the districts of Tbilisi. He was loved by the people because he was not just a policeman to them, but also a defender of kindness and morals. One day, Kukaracha receives a threat from a local gang.

== Starring ==
- Levan Uchaneishvili (Kukaracha)
- Nineli Chankvetadze (Inga)
- Zaza Kolelishvili (Murtalo)
- Mari Janashia (Aniko)
- Lado Tatishvili
- Givi Tokhadze
- Dudukhana Tserodze
- Lia Kapanadze
- Tamaz Toloraia
- Bondo Goginava
- Grigol Tsitaishvili
- Ketevan Esaiashvili
- Omar Gabelia
- Iamze Tkavadze
- Jimi Devnozashvili
- Dato Kublashvili
- Mikheil Kozakov
- D. Nafetvaridze
- D. Tsetskhladze
- L. Lomsadze
- Ketevan Murvanidze
- Akaki Berdzenishvili
- B. Berdzenishvili
- Anzor Urdia
- Nodar Sulemanashvili
- L. Sulemanashvili
- Platon Koiava

== Production ==
The film is also Siko Dolidze’s last film.

== Awards ==
it received the Award for the best adaptation at the 1983 All-Union Film Festival.

== Legacy ==
Levan Uchaneishvili’s role in the film was highly praised and considered his most iconic performance. After this, he moved to the United States during the 90s where he portrayed Russian or Eastern European characters, often in action or thriller genres, most notably in the 1997 movie Air Force One where he played one of the terrorists working for Egor Korshunov (Gary Oldman). Other notable roles in American movies are Independence Day, Blade, Virus, Wishmaster 2: Evil Never Dies (Andrew Divoff and Ilia Volok worked with Levan Uchaneishvili before on Air Force One) and 25th Hour.

The film is considered a good example of the production during the Golden Age of Georgian cinema.
