= Synetic Theater =

Physical theater company in Arlington, Virginia

Coordinates: 38.856857°N 77.049485°W

- Theatre logo
- Formation: 2001
- Type: Theatre group
- Location: Arlington County, Virginia / Washington, D.C.
- Artistic director: Paata Tsikurishvili (founder)
- Notable members: Irina Tsikurishvili (founder, choreographer)
- Website: http://www.synetictheater.org/

Synetic Theater is a non-profit physical theater company located in the Washington metropolitan area in the United States. It performs at the Crystal City Theatre in Crystal City in Arlington County, Virginia. Since its founding in 2001, its productions have received numerous awards.

== History ==
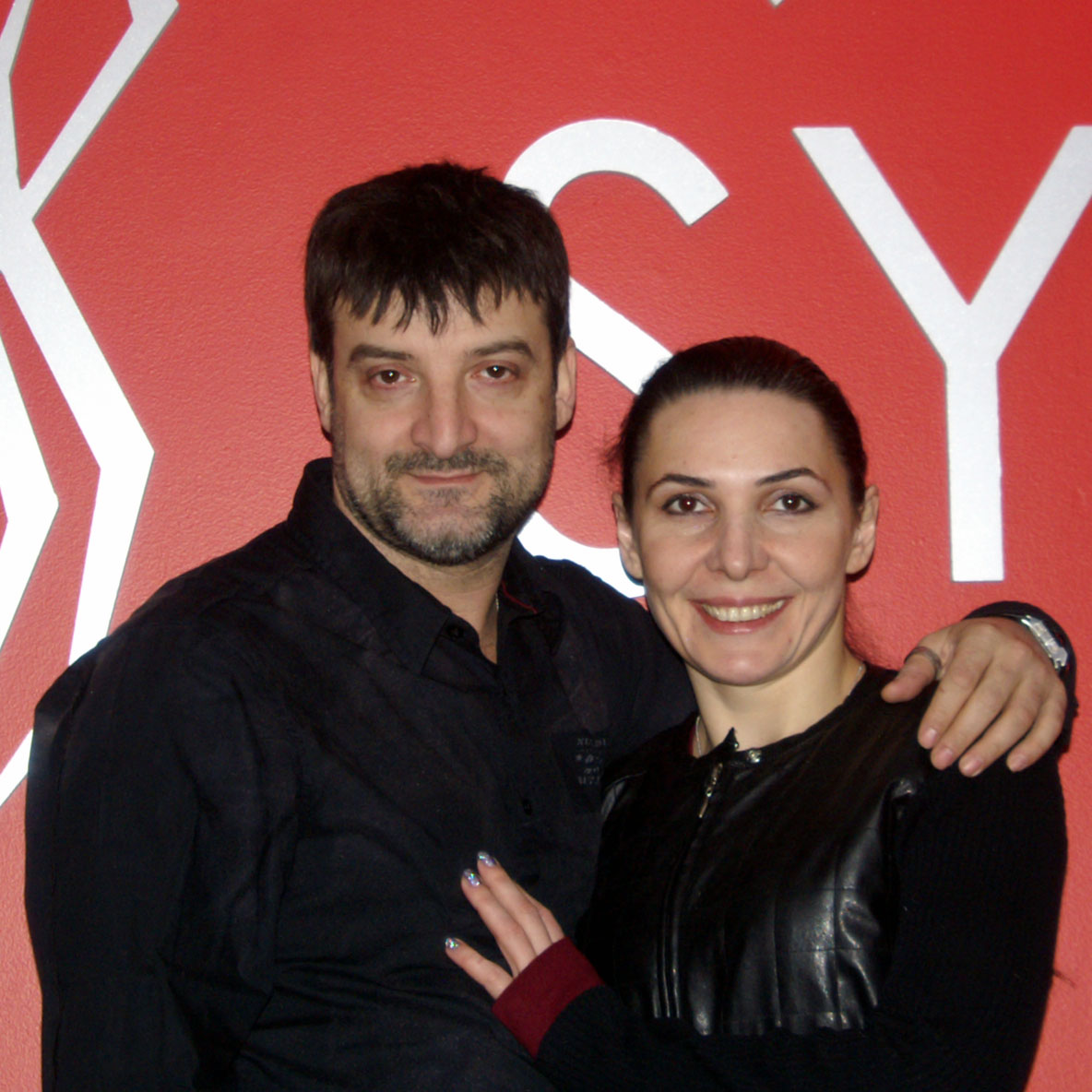
Paata Tsikurishvili and Irina Tsikurishvili, founding artistic director and founding choreographer of Synetic Theater

Founded in 2001, Synetic Theater began as an artistic subgroup within the now defunct Stanislavsky Theater Studio which performed at the Church Street Theater in Washington, D.C., the result of an artistic split by the husband and wife team of Paata and Irina Tsikurishvili from Andrei Malaev-Babel, the other co-head of The Stanislavsky Theater Studio.

In April 2002, the theatre made its artistic debut with a wordless adaptation of William Shakespeare's Hamlet, known as Hamlet…the rest is silence. The production was remounted the following season, receiving the Helen Hayes Award for Outstanding Resident Play, Outstanding Choreography and Outstanding Director.

Despite the artistic split, Synetic Theater and the Stanislavsky Theater Studio continued to share resources and performance space into the following season.

In 2003, after a series of disagreements over financial matters, Synetic set off on its own. The following year, in 2004, it merged with Classika Theater, a children's theater in Shirlington, Virginia.

In 2010, the American Theatre Wing awarded Synetic their National Theatre Company Grant. In 2014, Paata and Irina Tsikurishvili were honored as Washingtonians of the Year by Washingtonian magazine for their contributions to the Washington theater community.

== Facilities ==
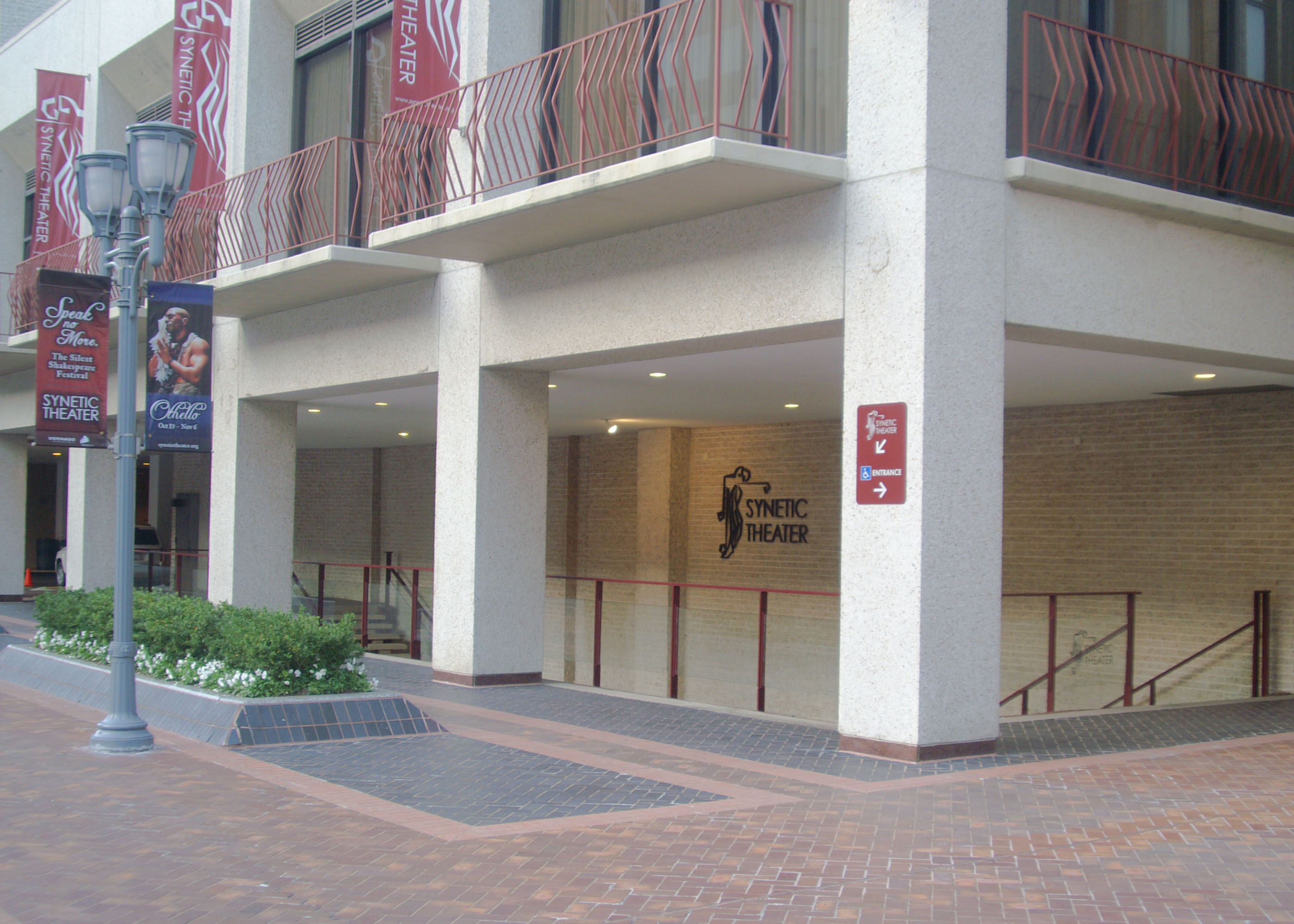
The entrance to Synetic Theater's Crystal City Performance space in Crystal City, Virginia during production of Othello

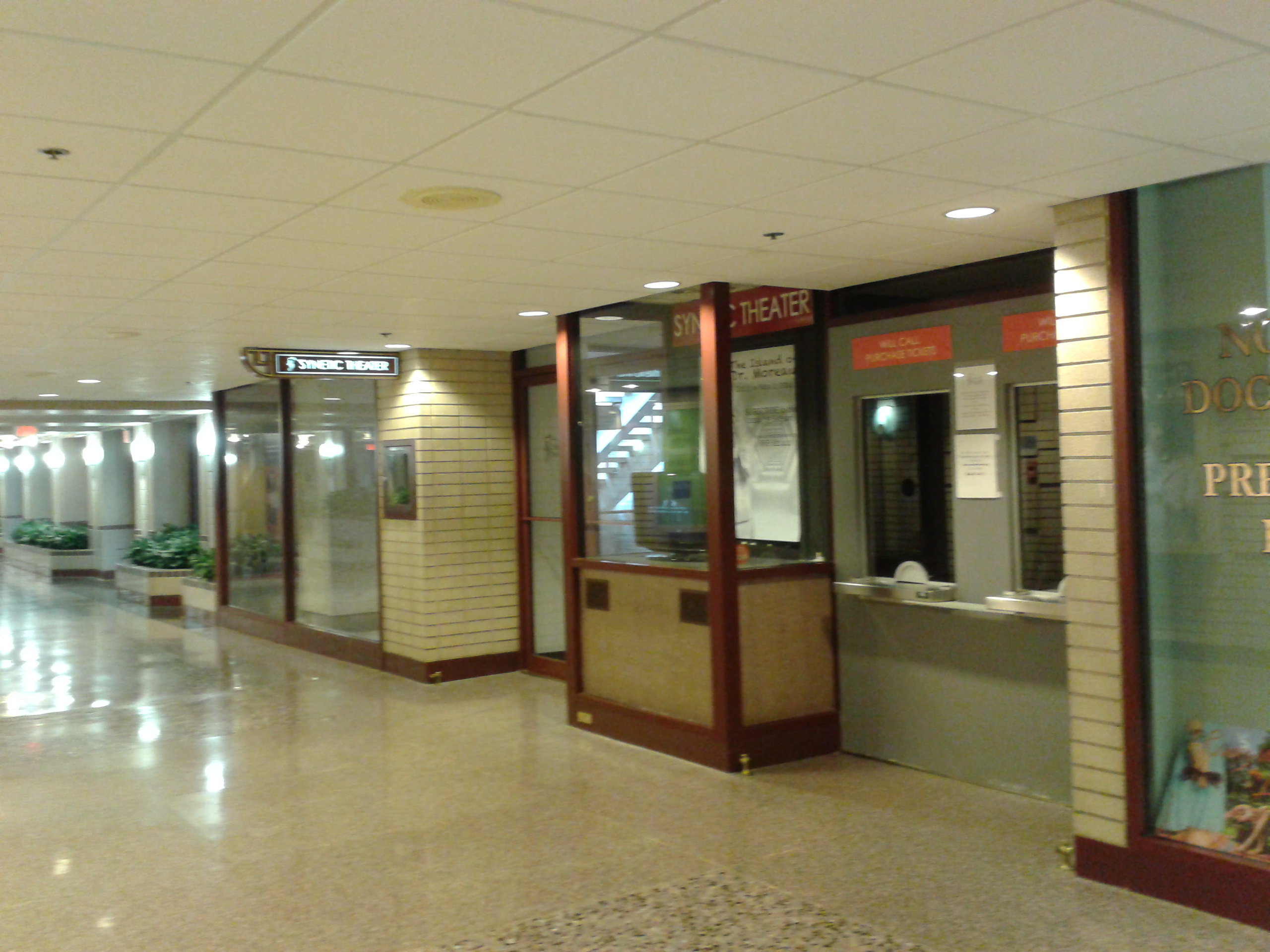
The underground entrance to the Synetic Theater in Crystal City

The Synetic Theater's offices and administrative spaces are located at 2155 Crystal Plaza Arcade in Crystal City, Virginia.

Until 2010, Synetic performed most of its shows in the Arlington County-run Rosslyn Spectrum. In September 2010, it moved into the Crystal City Theatre space outfitted by the Arena Stage after the Arena Stage moved back to its newly renovated spaces in Washington D.C. Between 2006 and 2010, it performed one show each spring in the Kennedy Center.

In the 2009–2010 season, it produced the premiers of its "Silent Shakespeare" series at the Shakespeare Theatre Company's Lansburgh Theatre. With the company's move to Crystal City, the relationship with the Shakespeare Theatre Company and the Lansburgh Theatre ended.

In 2010, Synetic moved into the theater housed in Crystal City Undergound.

In 2018, it was announced that JBG Smith would not renew the lease for Synetic's Crystal City theater. After several extensions on the lease, Synetic left the Crystal City theater in April 2024.

== Productions ==
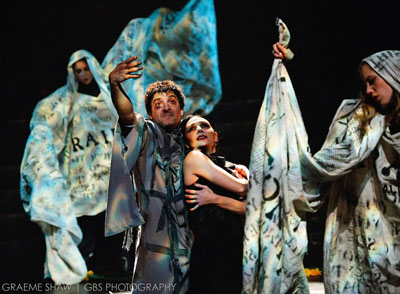
Paata Tsikurishvili as the Master and Irina Tsikurishvili as Margarita, with Sarah Taurchini and Katherine Frattini as manuscript pages. From the 2010/2011 production of The Master and Margarita at the Lansburgh Theatre.

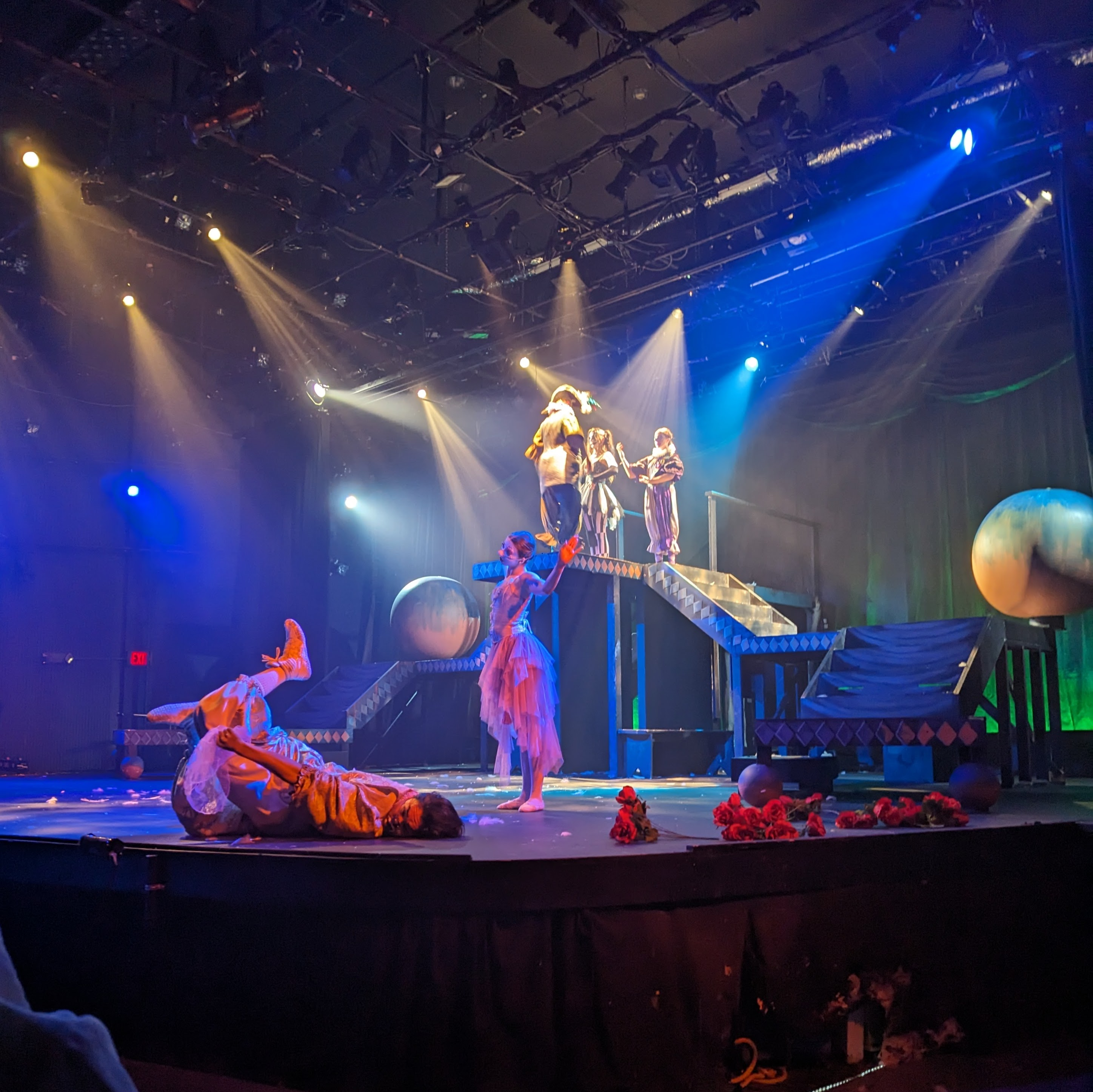
Cyrano de Bergerac (2023)

=== 2015–2016 ===
- Alice in Wonderland, September 30 – November 8, 2015
- As You Like It, December 9, 2015 – January 17, 2016
- Romeo and Juliet,^{†} February 17 – March 27, 2016
- The Man in the Iron Mask, May 11 – June 19, 2016
- Twelfth Night,^{†} July 13 – August 7, 2016

^{†} Remounted

=== 2014–2015 ===
- The Island of Doctor Moreau, October 1 – November 2, 2014
- Beauty and the Beast, December 3, 2014 – January 4, 2015
- Much Ado About Nothing, February 11 – March 15, 2015
- A Tale of Two Cities, May 13 – June 14, 2015
- A Midsummer Night's Dream,^{†} July 15 – August 9, 2015

^{†} Remounted

=== 2013–2014 ===
- The Picture of Dorian Gray, September 26, 2013 – November 3, 2013
- Twelfth Night, January 9, 2014 – February 16, 2014
- Hamlet ... the rest is silence,^{†} March 13, 2014 – April 6, 2014
- Three Men in a Boat, May 8, 2014 – June 8, 2014

^{†} Remounted

=== 2012–2013 ===
- Dr. Jekyll and Mr. Hyde, September 20 – October 21, 2012
- A Trip to the Moon, December 6, 2012 – January 6, 2013
- The Tempest, February 21 – March 24, 2013
- The Three Musketeers, May 9 – June 9, 2013
- A Midsummer Night's Dream,^{†} July 24 – August 4, 2013

^{†} Remounted

=== 2011–2012 ===
- Speak No More: Silent Shakespeare Festival
  - Macbeth,^{†} September 14 – October 2, 2011 at Crystal City
  - Othello,^{†} October 19 – November 6, 2011 at Crystal City
  - Romeo and Juliet,^{†} November 25 – December 23, 2011 at Crystal City
- New Movements – New Works, New Artists Festival
  - Genesis Reboot, February 9 – March 3, 2012 at Crystal City
  - The Voice of Anne Frank, March 14 and March 19, 2012 at Crystal City
- The Taming of The Shrew, March 31 – April 22, 2012 at the Lansburgh Theatre
- Home of the Soldier, May 23 – July 1, 2012 at Crystal City

^{†} Remounted

=== 2010–2011 ===
- King Arthur, September 30 – October 31, 2010 at Crystal City
- The Master and Margarita,^{†} November 11 – December 12, 2010 at the Lansburgh Theatre
- A Midsummer Night's Dream,^{†} January 25–30, 2011 at Crystal City
- King Lear, March 24 – April 24, 2011 at the Lansburgh Theatre
- Don Quixote, June 2 – July 3, 2011 at Crystal City

^{†} Remounted

=== 2009–2010 ===
- A Midsummer Night's Dream,^{†} September 17 – October 10, 2009 at Rosslyn Spectrum
- Dracula,^{†} October 16 – November 15, 2009 at Rosslyn Spectrum
- Antony and Cleopatra, January 28 – February 28, 2010 at Lansburgh Theatre
- Metamorphosis, April 9 – May 22, 2010 at Rosslyn Spectrum
- Othello, June 3 – July 3, 2010 at The John F. Kennedy Center

^{†} Remounted

=== 2008–2009 ===
- Host and Guest,^{†} September 26 – November 9, 2008 at Rosslyn Spectrum
- Dante, February 6 – March 22, 2009 at Rosslyn Spectrum
- Lysistrata, March 27 – April 5, 2009 at Georgetown University, April 11–26, 2009 at Rosslyn Spectrum
- A Midsummer Night's Dream, May 28 – June 15, 2009 at the John F. Kennedy Center for the Performing Arts. Since many of Synetic's company members were from the country of Georgia, Host and Guest was remounted in reaction to the Russian invasion of Georgia in August 2008. The production replaced the originally scheduled stage adaptation of the vintage horror film The Cabinet of Dr. Caligari.

^{†} Remounted

== Significant events ==
In 2010, Synetic Theater moved to the Crystal City Theatre in Crystal City, Virginia.

Synetic Theater was invited to perform in Tbilisi, Georgia. Remount performances of King Lear and Host and Guest were presented at the Rustaveli Theatre from 3 to 19 November 2012. The tour was supported by the U.S. Department of State, the Mid-Atlantic Arts Foundation, and the Trust for Mutual Understanding.

In 2013, Synetic raised funds for new studio space in Crystal City near the theater space. The studio has three classrooms that can be used for camps, classes, and rehearsal space, as well as a green room and a reception area.

In 2014, Synetic Theater produced its 10th "Silent Shakespeare" adaptation, Twelfth Night.

Also in 2014, Synetic Theater's production of A Midsummer Night's Dream was invited to the 10th Festival Internacional in Chihuahua, Mexico. They subsequently performed at Teatro Victor Hugo Rascon Banda, Juarez, Mexico.

== Significant past productions ==
=== Silent Shakespeare series ===
Synetic is noted for performing well-known Shakespeare plays without words. Hours-long plays are pared to 90 minutes of highly stylized dance, movement, acrobatics, pantomime, music, and story, without a word being spoken.

In a letter to patrons in a program, Michael Kahn, the artistic director of the Shakespeare Theatre Company, said, "Synetic's signature blend of music, movement, and dance represents a novel approach to Shakespeare". In the Directors Notes of The Tempest program, Paata Tsisurishvili stated, "Since our first production in 2002, I have often been asked, without the language, is what we do really Shakespeare? I believe it is. Since Shakespeare has been translated into multiple languages, his words having found multiple expressions and becoming a truly universal institution in the process, we believe the language of movement is no less valid method of exploring his work than any other. As Shakespeare himself painted with words, we attempt to paint his words with our images, offering an archetypical Shakespeare that we know, as one reviewer put it, 'in our bones'".

Productions are regularly remounted in the years following their initial production.

The series includes the following well-reviewed and award-winning productions:

Play	Initial production	Reviewed
Hamlet…the rest is silence^{^}	April 2002	The Washington Post
Macbeth^{^}	January 2007	The Washington Post
Romeo and Juliet^{^}	January 2008	The Washington Post
A Midsummer Night's Dream^{^}	May 2009	The Washington Post
Antony and Cleopatra^{†}	January 2010	The Washington Post
Othello	June 2010	The Washington Post
King Lear	March 2011	The Washington Post
The Taming of the Shrew	March 2012	The Washington Post
The Tempest	February 2013	The Washington Post
Twelfth Night	January 2014	The Washington Post
Much Ado About Nothing	February 2015	The Washington Post

^{^} – Helen Hayes Award winner

^{†} – Named one of the year's "10 best" by the Washington Post

In January 2011, A Midsummer Night's Dream was remounted by invitation at the '62 Center for Theatre and Dance at Williams College in Williamstown, Massachusetts.

=== Classic Literature series ===
Play	Initial production	Reviewed
Host and Guest	2002	The Washington Post
Dracula	September 2005	The Washington Post
Frankenstein	September 2006	The Washington Post
The Dybbuk (joint with Theater J)	February 2006	The Washington Post
Faust	June 2006	The Washington Post
Carmen	May 2009	The Washington Post
Don Quixote	June 2011	The Washington City Paper
The Three Musketeers	May 2013	The Washington Post

The Washington Post named Host and Guest as one of the ten best performances of the decade. The Harriman Institute at Columbia University requested its presentation at the university's Miller Theatre.

== Awards ==
Synetic has earned a large number of Helen Hayes Nominations, and won many Helen Hayes Awards in ten seasons. Most of the awards have been for its wordless Shakespearean repertoire. Its more prestigious awards include:

- 2012 Outstanding Sound Design/original music, Resident Production, Konstantine Lortkipanidze, King Lear
- 2012 Outstanding Choreography, Resident Production, Ben Cunis, Irina Tsikurishvili King Lear
- 2012 Outstanding Ensemble, Resident Play, King Lear
- 2011 Outstanding Director: Resident Play, Paata Tsikurishvili, Othello
- 2011 The Canadian Embassy Award for Outstanding Ensemble, Resident Play, Othello
- 2011 Outstanding Costume Designer: Resident Play, Anastasia Simes, Othello
- 2011 Outstanding Lighting Design: Resident Play, Colin Bills, Master & Margarita
- 2010 The Canadian Embassy Award for Outstanding Ensemble, Resident Play, A Midsummer Night's Dream
- 2009 The Canadian Embassy Award for Outstanding Ensemble, Resident Play, Romeo and Juliet
- 2009 Outstanding Director: Resident Play, Paata Tsikurishvili, Romeo and Juliet
- 2009 Outstanding Choreography: Resident Production, Irina Tsikurishvili, Carmen
- 2008 Outstanding Resident Play, Macbeth
- 2008 The Canadian Embassy Award for Outstanding Ensemble, Resident Play, Hamlet … the rest is silence
- 2008 Outstanding Director: Resident Play, Paata Tsikurishvili, Macbeth
- 2008 Outstanding Choreography: Resident Production, Irina Tsikurishvili, Macbeth
- 2008 Outstanding Sound Design: Resident Production, Paata Tsikurishvili, iriakli kavsadze Macbeth
- 2008 Outstanding Supporting Actor: Resident Production, Phillip Fletcher, Macbeth
- 2007 Outstanding Choreography: Resident Production, Irina Tsikurishvili, Frankenstein
- 2005 Outstanding Choreography: Resident Production, Irina Tsikurishvili, The Master and Margarita
- 2003 Outstanding Resident Play, Hamlet … the rest is silence
- 2003 Outstanding Director: Resident Play, Paata Tsikurishvili, Hamlet … the rest is silence
- 2003 Outstanding Choreography: Resident Production, Irina Tsikurishvili, Hamlet … the rest is silence

== Other items of note ==
The name Synetic was coined by founding artistic director Paata Tsikurishvili from the words synthesis (the coming together of distinct elements to form a whole) and kinetic (pertaining to or imparting motion; active ... dynamic ...) yielding "Synetic Theater – a Dynamic Synthesis of the Arts".

Synetic Theater is a member of the League of Washington Theaters.
