= Nana Mchedlidze =

Soviet actor and film director (1926–2016)

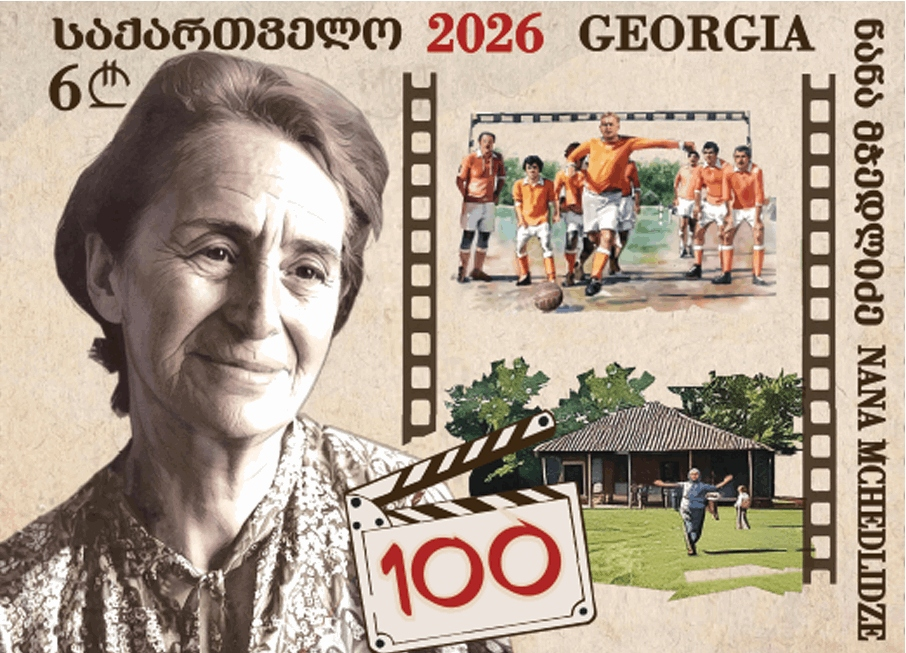
- Mchedlidze on a 2026 stamp of Georgia
- Born: 20 March 1926; Khoni, Georgian SSR, Soviet Union
- Died: 29 March 2016 (aged 90); Tbilisi, Georgia
- Education: Shota Rustaveli Theatre and Film University
- Occupations: Film director, actress, screenwriter

Nana Mchedlidze (Georgian: ნანა მჭედლიძე, Russian: Нана Мчедлидзе; 20 March 1926 – 29 March 2016) was a Soviet and Georgian actress, film director and screenwriter.

From 1950 to 1954 she was an actress with the Tbilisi Rustaveli Theatre. After 1957 she was the director of the film studio Georgia-Film.

She became a People's Artist of the Georgian SSR in 1983.
