= Holly Fields =

American actress (active 1987– )

- Occupations: Actress; singer
- Years active: 1987–present

Holly Fields is an American film, television and theater actress and singer.

== Career ==
Fields was Molly Ringwald's understudy at age 7 in Through the Looking Glass. After touring the country in the national show, she joined the Broadway cast of Annie at age ten. She starred in many other shows, including the National Tour of A Christmas Carol as Tiny Tim for two years. Following success on stage, she transitioned to television, commercials and modeling. Fields, then age 13, was booked for the CBS pilot for CBS Summer Playhouse: Fort Figueroa (1988) and starred alongside Charles Haid.

She then appeared in over 100 commercials and 40 TV shows and films by the end of 1990, including MacGyver, Charles in Charge, Charmed, Quantum Leap, and Growing Pains. For her extensive work during this time, she was presented with two Youth in Film awards for "Best Newcomer" and "Best Female Guest Star." Christopher Guest then cast her in The Big Picture (1989).

She discovered at an early age that she was able to copy voices, and after looping for others when asked, she became a professional voice match artist/looper. She voiced Cameron Diaz's voice and singing in over 60 projects, including Princess Fiona in Shrek. Fields re-voiced stars such as Drew Barrymore, Kate Bosworth, Leslie Mann, Brittany Murphy, Paula Abdul, Gwen Stefani, Britney Spears, Jennifer Love Hewitt, and Hailee Steinfeld.

Fields starred in Wishmaster 2, Seedpeople, and other horror films. She voiced Nadia Grell in the video game Star Wars: The Old Republic and appeared on The OC as Aunt Cindy, Julie Cooper's estranged sister.

In 2014 Fields appeared as a mentor in the reality TV show The Reel Deal alongside Eric Roberts, Don Wilson, Judy Norton, Dustin Diamond, and Tim Russ. The celebrities were paired with new actors, writers, directors and composers to make a movie in 4 days.

Fields sings with bands and does vocal work on albums, including three of her own. She was produced by Robbie Nevil and Joey Carbone and was given a record deal in Japan, where she tours.

== Filmography ==
=== Film ===
Year	Title	Role
1989	The Big Picture	Daughter
1989	Communion	Praying Mantis Girl
1992	Seedpeople	Kim Tucker
1995	Mr. Payback: An Interactive Movie	Gwen
1997	First Encounter	
1999	Interceptor Force	Lucy
1999	Wishmaster 2: Evil Never Dies	Morgana Truscott
2001	Fishes	Bambi
2004	Sunflower	Rachael
2004	Wild Roomies	Holly
2006	The Still Life	Stephanie
2006	The Iron Man	Swedish Girl
2007	Starting from Scratch	Kathy
2013	Four Senses	Esther

=== Television ===
Year	Title	Role	Notes
1987	Hard Copy	Finny	1 episode
1987	Married... with Children	Jenny	1 episode
1987	ABC Afterschool Specials	Lisa Kirk	1 episode
1988	CBS Summer Playhouse	Michell Perry	1 episode
1988	It's Garry Shandling's Show	Madeline	1 episode
1989	MacGyver	Jennifer Reiner, Crystal	1 episode
1989	Quantum Leap	Jill	1 episode
1989	Falcon Crest	Tami	1 episode
1989	A Brand New Life	Tammy	3 episodes
1989	ALF	Joanie	1 episode
1999	Charmed	Jane Franklin	1 episode
2004	The O.C.	Aunt Cindy	1 episode

=== Video games ===
Year	Title	Role	Notes
2004	Shrek 2 Activity Center: Twisted Fairy Tale Fun	Princess Fiona	
2004	Shrek 2	Princess Fiona, Female Citizens	
2004	Spider-Man 2	Black Cat / Felicia Hardy	
2005	Shrek SuperSlam	Princess Fiona	
2006	Shrek Smash n' Crash Racing	Princess Fiona	
2007	Shrek the Third	Princess Fiona, Ogre Baby #1, Witch #3	
2007	Shrek: Ogres & Dronkeys	Princess Fiona, Ogre Babies	
2008	Shrek's Carnival Craze Party Games	Princess Fiona, Puppet Singers	
2010	White Knight Chronicles 2	Additional voices	
2010	Shrek Forever After	Princess Fiona	
2011	DreamWorks Super Star Kartz	Princess Fiona	
2011	Star Wars: The Old Republic	Nadia Grell	
2023	DreamWorks All-Star Kart Racing	Princess Fiona	
