= Other People's Children (1958 film) =

- სხვისი შვილები
- Directed by: Tengiz Abuladze
- Screenplay by: Tengiz Abuladze, Rezo Japaridze
- Cinematography: Levan Paatashvili
- Edited by: Vasil Dolenko
- Music by: Archil Kereselidze
- Production company: Kartuli filmi
- Release date: 1958
- Running time: 77 minutes
- Country: Soviet Union
- Languages: Russian, Georgian

Other People's Children (Georgian: სხვისი შვილები translit. Skhvisi shvilebi, Russian: Чужие дети, romanized: Chuzhiye deti) is a 1958 Soviet black-and-white Social-themed drama film co-written with Rezo Japaridze and directed by Tengiz Abuladze.

== Plot ==
Data is deeply in love with Theo and wants her to be his wife, but Theo is wary of commitment and reluctant to take responsibility for Data’s two children, Gia and Lia, from his previous marriage. She wants to live freely with Data only while they enjoy each other's company. Data, captivated by Theo, neglects his children, who spend their days roaming the streets unsupervised. One day, Gia nearly gets hit by a car and is saved by a passerby, Nato, who notices the children's lack of care and brings them home. Nato tends to Gia’s wounds, tidies their home, and unknowingly leaves a profound impact on the children. When Data returns home, he is surprised to find the children asleep and his apartment in perfect order. Later, the children spot Nato again and eagerly introduce her to their father, who becomes increasingly drawn to her warmth and kindness. On Lia's birthday, the children invite Nato, sparking a deeper connection with Data that eventually leads to their marriage. Nato becomes a nurturing figure for Lia, who embraces her as a new mother, while Gia, struggling to adjust, gradually warms to her as she considers putting her studies on hold to care for the family.

Despite this new stability, Data remains haunted by his feelings for Theo. When she returns, saying she's leaving for good, Nato encourages Data to say his goodbyes, unaware of his lingering attraction. Taking Gia with him as a safeguard, Data accompanies Theo to the station, but in a moment of weakness, impulsively jumps on the departing train, leaving Gia to return home alone. Shattered, Gia approaches Nato, seeking comfort, and asks if he can call her "Mom." Devastated by Data's betrayal, Nato becomes consumed by her sorrow and decides to leave. However, as her train departs, she hears Lia’s desperate cries, which rekindle her spirit. In a moment of resolve, she leaps off the train, returning to the children and fully embracing her role as their mother.

== Cast ==
- Tsitsino Tsitsishvili as Nato
- Otar Koberidze as Dato
- Asmat Qandaurashvili as Teo
- Nani Chikvinidze as Lia
- Mikho Borashvili as Gia
- Sesilia Takaishvili as Elisabedi
- Akaki Kvantaliani as glass container receiver
- Joseph Lagidze as Guram

== Awards ==
- International film festival in Porretta Terme, 1960 — Special Award
- International film festival in Helsinki, 1959 — Diploma
- International film festival in London, 1959 — Diploma
