= Wishmaster 2: Evil Never Dies =

1999 film

- Promotional release poster
- Directed by: Jack Sholder
- Written by: Jack Sholder
- Based on: Characters by Peter Atkins
- Produced by: Tony Amatullo
- Starring: Andrew Divoff; Paul Johansson; Holly Fields; Bokeem Woodbine
- Cinematography: Carlos González
- Edited by: Michael Schweitzer
- Music by: David C. Williams
- Distributed by: Artisan Entertainment
- Release date: March 12, 1999
- Running time: 96 minutes
- Country: United States
- Languages: English; Russian
- Budget: $2.5 million

Wishmaster 2: Evil Never Dies is a 1999 direct-to-video dark fantasy horror film written and directed by Jack Sholder. A sequel to the 1997 film Wishmaster, the film premiered on television on March 12, 1999, and was released on DVD on August 17, 1999, bundled with the first film.

== Plot ==
During the robbery of a museum, a stray gunshot releases an ancient Djinn imprisoned in a fire opal. One of the burglars, a young woman named Morgana Truscott, steals the gem and shoots a museum guard, but is forced to abandon the other burglar during her escape. The Djinn kills the remaining burglar when he wishes he had never been born. As the police enter the museum, the Djinn assumes its human persona, "Nathaniel Demerest," and surrenders to the police.

Morgana has dreams where she sees glimpses of the Djinn in his true form. Later, Morgana goes to Church to visit the priest tending the church, a man named Gregory, a former lover of Morgana's. She tells him that a man named Demerest confessed to the robbery. In prison, Demerest offers wishes to several inmates in exchange for their souls. He is confronted by Butz and his two henchmen, the Tiger brothers. Believing Demerest to be a dealer, Butz asks for drugs on which he can "get wasted ... stomped into the ground." Demerest grants his wish literally, and Butz is savagely beaten by his own underlings. Demerest is temporarily sent to solitary, suspected of instigating a spate of recent troubles at the prison.

Morgana researches Persian mythology, particularly the Persian deity Ahura Mazda, who had bound the Djinn in the past. Morgana opens up to Gregory, telling him about her nightmares in which a voice tells her to "fulfill the prophecy," and she tells of her involvement in the robbery and the murder of a guard. Morgana goes to the prison to visit Demerest and demands to know why he falsely confessed to the robbery. He says it was so she would not have to before showing his true form, driving Morgana away.

Morgana undergoes rituals aimed at purifying her soul, as only someone pure of heart can return the Djinn back into his prison. Meanwhile, Demerest kills the prison warden, Tillaver, and escapes with a Russian inmate he befriended named Osip. As Demerest drinks with Osip, Morgana enters and shoots Demerest, but he is unaffected by the wound. She leaves, in despair.

Gregory finds Morgana praying at the church altar. She laments that her guilt, the blood of the innocent man she killed at the museum heist, can never be washed away, and she can never hope to defeat the Djinn. Gregory has compiled more notes, discovering that the Djinn is seeking 800 souls. He also finds the incantation used by the alchemist who imprisoned the Djinn.

In Las Vegas, the Djinn begins granting wishes to casino patrons to collect the remaining required souls. When Morgana and Gregory confront Demerest, Gregory wishes for the Djinn to be sent back to hell. They are all transported inside the fire opal where Gregory is crucified. Morgana angrily wishes for a world without evil; the Djinn says that evil is half of a perfect circle (the other half presumably being good). Morgana asks the Djinn the meaning of fulfilling the prophecy. The Djinn recites the prophecy to her, that after 800 souls are gathered, the one who wakes the Djinn shall have three wishes. Upon the granting of all three, the race of Djinn will reign over the Earth. Morgana wishes for the guard she killed to be alive again. After receiving a vision of the guard alive and well, her pureness of heart restored, she takes the Djinn's fire opal and speaks the alchemist's chant, "Nib Sugurath Baheim." The Djinn is again banished into the opal, and all the victims are returned to life.

== Cast ==
- Holly Fields as Morgana Truscott
- Andrew Divoff as The Djinn / Nathaniel Demerest
- Paul Johansson as Gregory Valentin
- Bokeem Woodbine as Farralon
- Tommy Lister Jr. as Guard Tillaver
- Rhino Michaels as Butz
- James Kim as James Tiger
- Simon Kim as Simon Tiger
- Oleg Vidov as Osip Krutchkov
- Levan Uchaneishvili as Mr. Pushkin
- Timo Flloko as Moustafa Ransky
- Ilia Volok as Pushkin's Bodyguard

== Production ==
Prior to the release of the first film, pre-release tracking for the film gave Live Entertainment the confidence to begin development on a sequel which would be based on an existing treatment by Andrew Greenberg. In May 1998, it was reported that Holly Fields had signed on to star in the sequel, now with the subtitle Evil Never Dies, with Andrew Divoff slated to return as the Djinn and Jack Sholder attached to write and direct.

== Release ==
Wishmaster 2: Evil Never Dies premiered on cable television on March 12, 1999, before being given a straight-to-video release in the United States on August 17, 1999.

== Reception ==
The film received mainly negative reviews. On Rotten Tomatoes the film has an approval rating of 9% based on reviews from 11 critics.

During his interview for the documentary, Behind the Curtain Part II (2012), writer and director, Jack Sholder, had this to say about the film:
"That's one that I have very mixed feelings about because there are parts of it that I really like, but I think, all in all, it's a little dumb. To tell you the truth, I haven't seen it since I, uh, made it. When I was making it, I thought it was good. I thought a lot of it was kind of funny or clever. I definitely feel it has merit. From what I can gather, it's one of those films that divides people. Some people don't like it, others do. And, you know, it was also a sequel to a movie that I thought wasn't a good movie at all. It's a movie that I did, and I don't regret doing. You know, there's a lot of stuff that I think is pretty good from it. You know, like the scene from the casino I thought was pretty good. Maybe it comes off as being silly."

== Sequel ==
A sequel titled Wishmaster 3: Beyond the Gates of Hell, was released in 2001.
