= Goderdzi Chokheli =

Georgian novelist, scriptwriter, and film director

- გოდერძი ჩოხელი
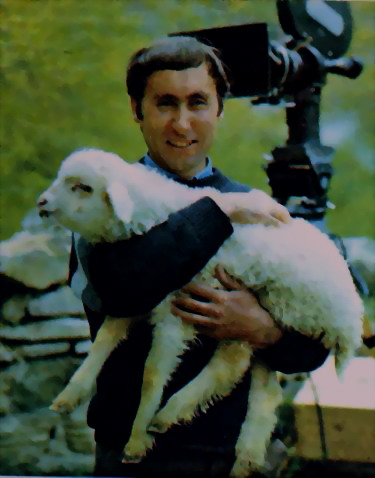
- Born: 2 October 1954
- Died: 16 November 2007 (aged 53); Tbilisi, Georgia
- Occupations: Writer, Film director and Scriptwriter
- Writing career
- Language: Georgian
- Subject: Allegory
- Literary movement: Realism

Goderdzi Chokheli (Georgian: გოდერძი ჩოხელი; 2 October 1954 – 16 November 2007) was a Georgian novelist, scriptwriter, and film director.

Goderdzi Chokheli was born on 2 October 1954 in the village Chokhi of Dusheti region. After finishing eighth grade at the village school, he continued his studies at Pasanauri secondary school. In 1972, he entered Shota Rustaveli Theatre and Film State University, the faculty of film studies. In 1974, he moved to the faculty of film production and graduated in 1979. The same year he started working at a film studio “Georgian Film” as a film director. From 1980, he is a member of Film Union, and from 1981 a member of Writers' Union. Since 1997, his short stories have been published in journals.

His first book was published in 1980. The book was awarded the best debut book prize. From 1981, the book has been published in Russian language. Goderdzi Chokheli has published a collection of verses and short stories: “Village of Twilight Colour”, “Letters of Fish”, “Keep Me Motherland!”, “Elections on Cemetery”; the collection of verses: “Pursuer Fate”, collection of short stories in Italian language “Black Aragvi” which was translated into other languages as well; novels: “Wolf” and “Priest's Sin”.

Goderdzi Chokheli has also directed several films: “Oak Tree Struck by Thunder”, “Mother of a Place”. In 1982 for the film Easter he was awarded grand prize at the International Short Film Festival Oberhausen.

== Bibliography ==
- A Letter to Spruce Trees (1980)
- Gorge of Twilight Colour (1981)
- Human Sadness (1984)
- Wolf, a novel (1988)
- Fish's Letters (1989)
- Priest's Sin (1990)
- Keep Me Motherland (1991)
- The Life of a Grass (1997)

== Filmography ==
- Adgilis Deda (1976)
- Khevsurian from Bakhurkhevi (1980)
- Human Sadness (1984)
- A Letter to Spruce Trees (1986)
- Easter Lamb (1988)
- The Stranger (1988)
- White Flag (1989)
- Children of Sin (1989)
- Gospel of Luke (1998)
- Doves of Paradise (1997)
- Chained Knights (1999)
- Fire of Love (2003)

== Awards ==
- Grand Prize for the film “Easter”, International Short Film Festival Oberhausen (1982)
- “Silver Nymph” and prize of International Catholic Church for the film “Children of Sin”, Monte Carlo Film Festival (1991)
- Special Prize at Japan Film Festival (1991)
- Prizes for the Best Script and Best Film Producing at Tbilisi “Gold Eagle” Festival (1992)
- Grand Prize at Anapa festival for the film “Turtle-Doves of Paradise” (1997)
- Prize for the best script at Anapa Festival for the film “Gospel According to Luke” (1998)
