= Givi Tokhadze =

Georgian actor (1922–2010)

- გივი თოხაძე
- Born: 20 October 1922; Poti, Transcaucasian SFSR, Soviet Union
- Died: 25 November 2010 (aged 88); Tbilisi, Georgia
- Occupation: Actor
- Years active: 1949–2005

Givi Maksimes dze Tokhadze (Georgian: გივი თოხაძე; 20 October 1922 – 25 November 2010) was a Georgian stage and film actor. A prolific performer in Georgian cinema, he was named a People's Artist of the Georgian SSR in 1982.

== Early life and career ==
Tokhadze was born on 20 October 1922 in Poti. He served in the Second World War, during which he was wounded, and in 1949 he graduated from the Shota Rustaveli Theatre Institute in Tbilisi.

From 1949 to 1952 he was an actor of the Rustaveli Theatre, and from 1956 he worked at the Georgian Film Studio, becoming one of the most familiar character actors of Georgian cinema; he was also invited to act at other Soviet studios. Among his film roles were Ushangi in The Lad from Sabudara (1957), Razhden in The Right Hand of the Grand Master (1970), and parts in Sergei Parajanov and Dodo Abashidze's The Legend of Suram Fortress (1984) and Kukaracha (1982).

== Awards and honours ==
- Honoured Artist of the Georgian SSR (1969)
- People's Artist of the Georgian SSR (1982)
- Order of the Patriotic War, 1st class (1985)
- Order of Honour (2000)

== Death ==
Tokhadze died on 25 November 2010 in Tbilisi.
