= Shota Rustaveli Theatre and Film University =

Public university in Tbilisi, Georgia

Shota Rustaveli Theatre and Film Georgia State university
- საქართველოს შოთა რუსთაველის თეატრის და კინოს უნივერსიტეტი
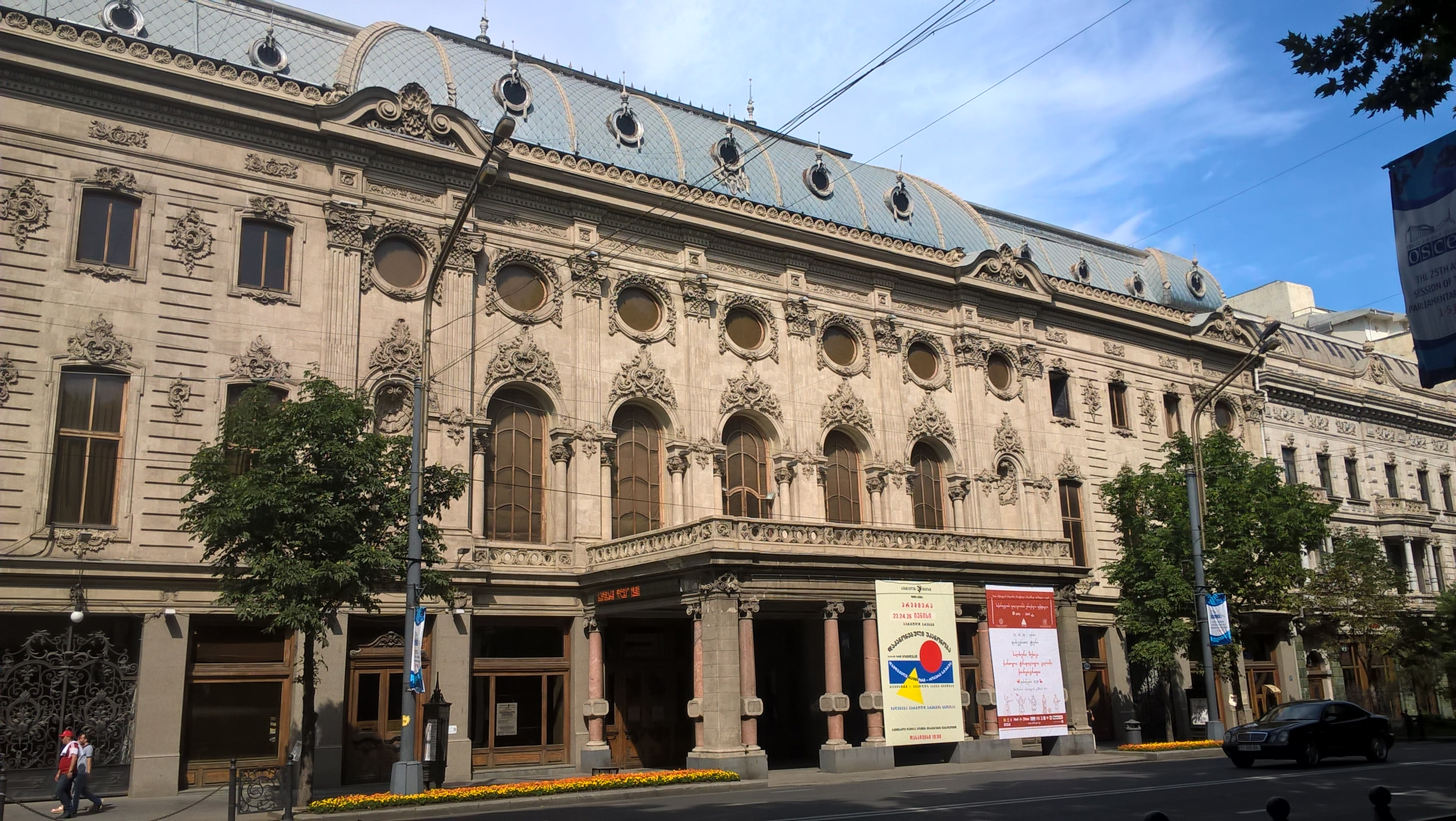
- Motto: Approaching The Century
- Type: Public
- Established: 1885; 141 years ago, 1923; 103 years ago
- Rector: Giorgi Shalutashvili
- Administrative staff: full-time, part-time
- Location: Tbilisi, Georgia; 41°42′18″N 44°48′03″E
- Campus: Urban
- Colours: Black; Blue
- Nickname: Teatraluri
- Mascot: Centaur
- Website: www.tafu.edu.ge

Shota Rustaveli Theater and Georgia State Film University (TAFU) is one of the oldest universities in the Caucasus and Georgia. The Theater and Film University has dedicated solely to the visual and performing arts. The chief founder of the university was a well-known Georgian theater actor and director, Lado Meskhishvili.

== History ==
The first attempt to create a drama school in Georgia related to School Dramas in the Seminaries of Telavi (1782) and Tbilisi (1855), where by law it was possible to play “a comedy or any other conspicuous play once a week.” In 1880, the Statute of the Dramatic Society provided for it to “hold theater classes and temporary courses to prepare and train artists."

In 1912, Lado Meskhishivili attempted to establish drama courses and set up regulations.

In 1918, Giorgi Jabadari founded a studio and brought to it internationally acclaimed actors such as V. Anjaparidze, U. Chkheidze, A. Vasadze and Sh. Ghambashidze.

In 1922, a Drama Studio established under the leadership of A. Pagava, which according to the Resolution of the Council of People's Commissars dated October 10, 1922 (Protocol N 31), became the basis of the "Institute of Performing Arts." Studio participants enrolled to the second year. An additional enlistment for courses also announced.

The first rector of the institute was Akaki Paghava, the artistic director was Kote Marjanishvili, and the teachers were prominent scientists: I. Javakhishvili, D. Uznadze, G. Chubinashvili, A. Shanidze, G. Akhvlediani, A. Natishvili. The theater directors were A. Akhmeteli, M. Koreli, and the writers K. Gamsakhurdia, G. Robakidze, N. Shiukashvili. In 1924, the first 21 graduated from the institute. Among the graduates were: A. Khorava, V. Godziashvili, S. Takaishvili, T. Tsulukidze, M. Mrevlishvili, P. Kobakhidze, P. Kandelaki, P. Murghulia, G.Kuprashvili, N. Shengelaia, S.Chelidze, and others.

In 1927, the Institute ceased to function. New studios formed at the studio of the Rustaveli Theater in 1927–1935, which together with Sandro Akhmeteli was led by Akaki Vasadze, and later in 1935-1939 by Akaki Khorava.

The Training Program of the Studio and the level of graduate specialists is equivalent to other modern colleges. The Studio has trained actors for the theaters of Batumi, Abkhazia, Ossetia, Checheno-Ingushetia.

The Rustaveli Theater Studio taught 152 actors between 1927, and 1939.

A Studio was also established also in the Marjanishvili theater, where D. Janelidze had worked.

In 1933, A. Paghava built “Higher Courses of Performing Arts." Film Actor's Courses founded at the 'State Film Industry.'

On September 1, 1939, by resolution of the Government in the Akaki Khorava and Akaki Pagava initiative, the Theater Institute was reestablished by the Rustaveli Theater and other Studios. The rector was A. Khorava and the deputy minister A. Paghava.

After A. Khorava the rectors were: D. Aleksidze, M. Kveselava, L. Kiknadze, I. Tavadze, E. Gugushvili, G. Zhordania, G. Lortkipanidze, G. Margvelashvili, N. Chkhaidze, G. Margvelashvili. G.Shalutashvili.

In 1992, the Theater Institute was renamed as the State Theater and Film Institute.

In 2002, the institute was transformed into a university.

== Education ==
Graduates of the Shota Rustaveli Theater and the State Film University graduates have had a defining effect on the cultural development and the character of twentieth-century Georgian theater.

In 2005 the Shota Rustaveli Theater and Georgian State Film University was joined by the Ekvtime Takaishvili State University of Culture and Arts.

The university trains actors of drama and film, musical theater, puppetry, marionettes, and pantomime, directors of drama, film, and television, cinematographers, theater and film critics, art historians, specialists of television and other media, choreographers, managers of tourism and experts in the cultural-educational sector.

Students have gained international success and the highest awards in various film and theater festivals and competitions.

The university has the D. Aleksidze theater, a scientific library, laboratories, and an educational, scientific institute, which prepares encyclopedias of Georgian theater and cinema.

The university has faculties of Drama, Film, and Television, Humanities, Social Sciences and Management and Georgian Folk Music and Dance, where over a thousand students study for Bachelor, Master, and Doctoral degrees.

The university played a huge role in training specialists of theater and cinema for the entire Caucasus Region. The university brought together professionals for Russian, Armenian, Azerbaijani, Abkhazian, Ossetian, Ingush, Chechen and other theaters. Some now famous theaters founded by the training and diploma performances of the university (such as the Cinema Actors Theater, Meskhetian Theater, Theater Metekhi, Akhmeteli Theater, Theater of Saingilo, Pantomime Theater, and others).

The university maintains creative and scientific relations with other universities in different countries.

The university traditionally trains specialists who make a significant contribution to the development of Georgian Regional Theaters.

The university publishes a newspaper Duruji. In 2005–2009, its publishing house issued a paper “Culture," which was a joint publication of three art universities. The “Centaur” publishing house produces textbooks, manuals, scientific works and monographs written by professors of the university and also a journal, Art Science Studies.

The university locates in two buildings: the first building at Rustaveli Ave. N 19–23, the second building at David Agmashenebeli Ave. N40.

== Academic programs ==
The Education programs in Shota Rustaveli Theater and Georgia State Film University implement through two certified programs and three Bachelor programs.

=== Drama Faculty ===
The history of the faculty closely links with the history of the university, which established in 1923 as Institute of Performing Arts by the studio founded in 1922 by Akaki Paghava. The studio members enrolled in the institute's second year.

Among the first graduates of the institute in 1924 were A. Khorava, V. Godziashvili, T. Tsulukidze, S. Takaishvili and M. Mrevlishvili. The professors were Akaki Paghava, Kote Marjanishvili, Mikheil Koreli, Sandro Akhmeteli and Niko Shiukashvili.

Kote Marjanishvili was the artistic director of the institute. Instead of faculties, there were studios of drama and opera, and also schools of opera choir, plasticity, and rhythmic gymnastics. Lectures got delivered by I. Javakhishvili, D. Uznadze, G. Chubinashvili, A. Shanidze and others.

In 1926, the institute ceased to function. In 1927-39 only the Rustaveli Theater Studio was working.

In September 1939, the studios of Rustaveli and Marjanishvili Theaters merged with the studio of Film Fabric and the theater Institute has been restored. The members of these studios were accepted in the second, third and fourth courses of the studio.

In 1940, the Faculty of Drama Direction established in the Theater Institute.

Over the years, the department of actor's mastery and drama course was led by Akaki Khorava.

In 1956, the Institute expanded again, Music Department added to the Drama Faculty. In 1970, the Puppet Theater Actors specialization joined the Drama Faculty. Its founders were Shota Tsutsqiridze and Givi Sarchimelidze.

Since 1969, the Pantomime Theater Actor's specialty became he part of the Drama Faculty, in 1978, the Pantomime Theater Actor specialization founded under the guidance of Amiran Shalikashvili

Over the years, the department of actor's skills and stage direction was headed by D. Alexsidze, K. Pataridze.

Since 1973, the department divided, the head of Actor's department became Dmitry Alexsidze, and the head of Stage Direction department - Mikheil Tumanishvili. Since 1997 the department was headed G. Jordania.

At different times the Department of Acting got led by L. Mirtskhulava, Sh. Gatserelia; the Department of Stage Speech was led by Maliko Mrevlishvili and Babulia Nikolaishvili; Heads of the Department of Stage Movement were Constantine (Kotso) Badridze and Yuri Zaretski.

At the Drama Faculty, worked: A. Vasadze, G. Tovstonogov, D. Aleksidze, A. Mikeladze, K. Pataridze, V. Kushitashvili, M. Tumanishvili, A. Dvalishvili, and others.

The older generation of directors formed the core methodological principles of education, which in its essence bases on K. Stanislavski system as a foundation for training actors.

M. Tumanishvili, who was a student of G. Tovstonogov, developed training methodology, conducted bold experiments that subsequently would make it easier for graduates which would help to adjust and adapt to the new theater groups. Thus was created the renowned Film Actors Theater.

In subsequent years on the faculty worked: Shalva Gatserelia, Gaioz Jirdania, Medea Kuchukhidze, Akvsenti Gamsakhurdia, Anzor Kutateladze, Levan Mirtskhulava, Nana Demetrashvili, Konstantine Surmava, Temur Abashidze; head of stage speech department Leila Kapanadze, head of stage movement department Natela Ionatamishvili, masters of artistic reading Zinaida Kverenchkhiladze and Guram Sagaradze and others.

=== Film and TV Faculty ===
Film and TV Faculty of Shota Rustaveli Theater and Film State University established in 1972. Despite resistance from the USSR State Committee for Cinematography, the attempts of prominent Georgian filmmakers - Rezo Chkheidze, Tengiz Abuladze, Lana Gogoberidze, Eldar Shengelaia, Otar Ioseliani was successful, and the Faculty of Filmmaking established at the Theater Institute.

The first two groups of film directors got headed by Tengiz Abuladze, Irakli Kvirikadze, Lana Gogoberidze and Omar Gvasalia.

The first graduation of students included Temur Babluani, Nana Jorjadze, Nana Janelidze, Guram Petriashvili, Goderdzi Chokheli. In 1982 Chokheli's film "Easter" won Grand Prix at the International Short Film Festival Oberhausen.

Notable professors include Eldar Shengelaya, Giorgi Shengelaia, Otar Ioseliani, Rezo Esadze, Soso Chkhaidze, Gela Kandelaki.

Famous directors who were former students at the university: Dito Tsintsadze, Tato Kotetishvili, Aleko Tsabadze, Levan Tutberidze, David Janelidze, David Sikharulidze, David Takaishvili, Lado Sulakvelidze.

=== Humanities, Social Sciences, Business, and Management Faculty ===
The Humanities, Social Sciences, Business and Management Faculty is the biggest faculty of the university regarding some educational programs as well as the number of students.

The priority here is to study History and Theory of Art, including theater, film, visual arts and architecture.

At the same time, the faculty pays particular attention to the development of the specialties that do not belong to the humanitarian sphere but directly link to Arts and Culture. These include journalism – with the focus on culture as well as cultural tourism and arts management. In addition to its specializations, the faculty provides a comprehensive education for the entire university teaching disciplines required for an extensive education in the fields of Arts.

=== Georgian Folk Music and Choreography Faculty ===
The Georgian folk music and dance faculty is the newest addition to the Arts department.

In 2007, the university's drama department poklorisa and traditional Georgian art, Georgian folk and liturgical dance team dirizhorebisa Directors and Choreographers Georgian specialties have been added. Bandmaster of Georgian upbringing laid the foundation for Anzor Erkomashvili, Gomar hopes Badri Toidze the choreographer took responsibility to care Ucha Dvalishvili, lauz Chanishvili, B. Svanidze.

== Notable alumni ==
- Mzia Arabuli, best known for playing the lead role in the 2024 film Crossing.
- Levan Uchaneishvili, best known for playing the title character in the 1982 movie Kukaracha and later achieved worldwide recognition in American movies like Independence Day, Air Force One, Blade and 25th Hour.

Georgian folk music and dance of March 6, 2013, and got separated from her drama pkakultets Georgian folk music, and dance was created by the Faculty of Arts.

== See also ==
- List of modern universities in Europe (1801–1945)
