= Sesilia Takaishvili =

Georgian actress (1906–1984)

- Born: 30 September 1906; Batumi, Kutais Governorate, Russian Empire
- Died: 21 May 1984 (aged 77); Tbilisi, Soviet Union
- Occupation: Actress
- Years active: 1945–1983
- Awards: People's Artist of the USSR; People's Artist of the Georgian SSR

Sesilia Takaishvili (Georgian: სესილია თაყაიშვილი; 30 September 1906 – 21 May 1984) was a Georgian actress who was awarded the title People's Artist of the Georgian SSR in 1950; and People's Artist of the USSR in 1966. She appeared in more than forty films from 1945 to 1983.

== Selected filmography ==
Year	Title	Role	Notes
1958	Other People's Children		
1958	Young One from Sabudara		
1963	Me, Grandma, Iliko and Ilarion		
1970	Don't Grieve		
1972	The Saplings		
1977	The Wishing Tree		
1983	Blue Mountains		
