= Gaston Bouatchidzé =

Georgian-French writer and translator (1935–2022)

Gaston Bouatchidzé (Georgian: გასტონ ბუაჩიძე; 21 October 1935 – 12 July 2022) was a Georgian-French writer and translator.

Bouatchidzé was born in Tbilisi of a French mother and Georgian father who had lived in France for ten years before moving to the Soviet Union in 1934. Bouatchidzé graduated from the Lviv University, Ukrainian SSR, in 1958 and specialized in the French language and literature. He was a professor of French literature at the Tbilisi State University from 1960 to 1990, and an associate professor of comparative literary studies at the University of Nantes from 1991 to 2001. He has translated several pieces of Georgian literature into French, and vice versa. A principal subject of his research is the history of Franco-Georgian literary contacts. He was instrumental in forging sisterly ties between the cities of Nantes and Tbilisi, and in organizing the exhibition of the Georgian painter Pirosmani at the Nantes Museum of Fine Arts in 1999.
