= Revaz Chkheidze =

Georgian film director

- რევაზ ჩხეიძე
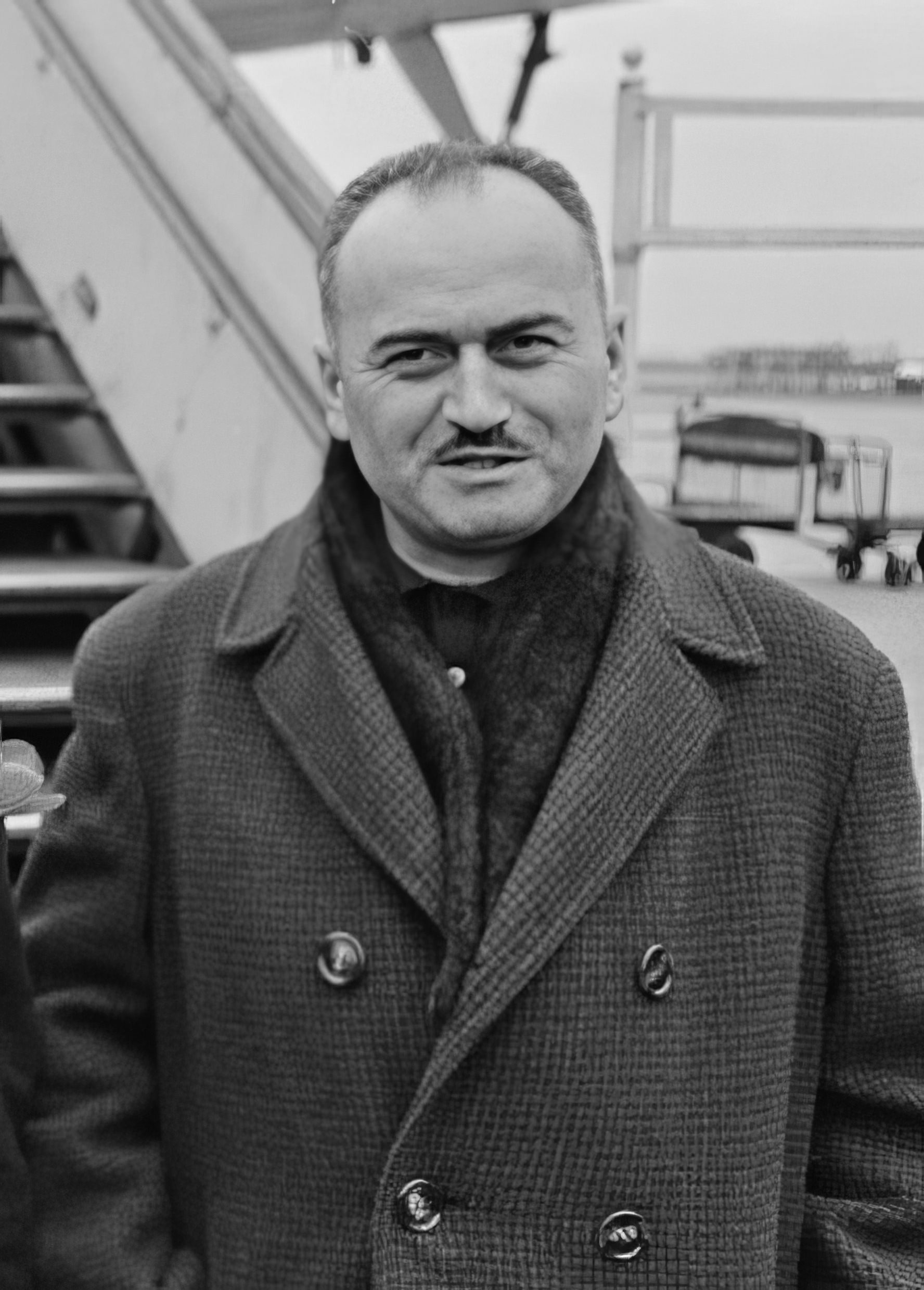
- Chkheidze in 1966
- Born: 8 December 1926; Kutaisi, Georgian SSR (now Georgia)
- Died: 3 May 2015 (aged 88); Tbilisi, Georgia
- Education: Shota Rustaveli Theatre and Film University
- Occupation: Film director
- Years active: 1953–2008
- Awards: People's Artist of the USSR; People's Artist of the Georgian SSR (1966)

Revaz "Rezo" Chkheidze (Georgian: რევაზ "რეზო" ჩხეიძე; 8 December 1926 – 3 May 2015) was a Georgian film director, People's Artist of the USSR, best known for his Soviet-era drama films, including his 1964 World War II-themed Father of a Soldier.

== Biography ==
Born in Kutaisi in the family of the writer Davit Chkheidze (he would be executed during the Great Purge in 1937), Chkheidze studied acting at Tbilisi State Institute of Theatre from 1943 to 1946 and continued his education under Sergei Yutkevich and Mikhail Romm at VGIK in Moscow from 1949 to 1953. Chkheidze directed twelve films and a TV miniseries between 1953 and 2008. He rose to fame with Magdana's Donkey, co-directed with Tengiz Abuladze, which won the Best Fiction Short award at the 1956 Cannes Film Festival. His 1964 film Father of a Soldier was entered into the 4th Moscow International Film Festival. The Saplings of 1972 won a diploma at the 8th Moscow International Film Festival.

During the Soviet era, Chkheidze was a Communist Party member and also served as secretary of Georgian SSR Union of Cinematography, then a top decision-making body in the field, from 1963 to 1981. Also, he was twice elected to the Supreme Soviet of the Soviet Union in 1974 and 1979. He was appointed executive director of Georgia's Kartuli Pilmi studio in 1973, a position he held, intermittently, into the 1990s.

Among Chkheidze's awards and accolades were the title of People’s Artist of the Soviet Union (1980), All-Union Film Festival Prize (1973, 1981), Lenin Prize (1986), Georgia's Order of Honor (1996), and Honorary Citizenship of Tbilisi (2001). A star in his honor was opened by Georgia's Ministry of Culture in front of the Rustaveli Cinema in Tbilisi in 2013.

Revaz Chkheidze died on 3 May 2015. He was buried on 7 May at the Didube Pantheon in Tbilisi.

Chkheidze's daughter Tamar (b. 1960) is a historian and former Soviet-era dissident who was active in Georgia's politics in the 1980s and early 1990s.

== Selected filmography ==
- Magdana's Donkey (1956)
- Father of a Soldier (1964)
- The Saplings (1972)

== Filmography ==
As director

- Boris Paichadze (1953)
- In Our Courtyard (1956)
- Maia Tskneteli (1959)
- Treasure (1961)
- Zgvis biliki (1962)
- Father of a Soldier (1964)
- Look at These Young People! (1969)
- The Saplings (1972)
- Earth, This Is Your Son (1980)
- Tskhovreba Don Kikhotisa da Sancho Pansasi (1988) (TV Mini-Series)
- Matskhovris Saplavze Antebuli Santeli (2008)

As writer

- Qeratmiani qalishvili (1968) (TV Short)
- Earth, This Is Your Son (1980)
- Tskhovreba Don Kikhotisa da Sancho Pansasi (1988) (TV Mini-Series)
- Matskhovris Saplavze Antebuli Santeli (2008)
