= Tengiz Abuladze =

Georgian film director (1924–1994)

- თენგიზ აბულაძე
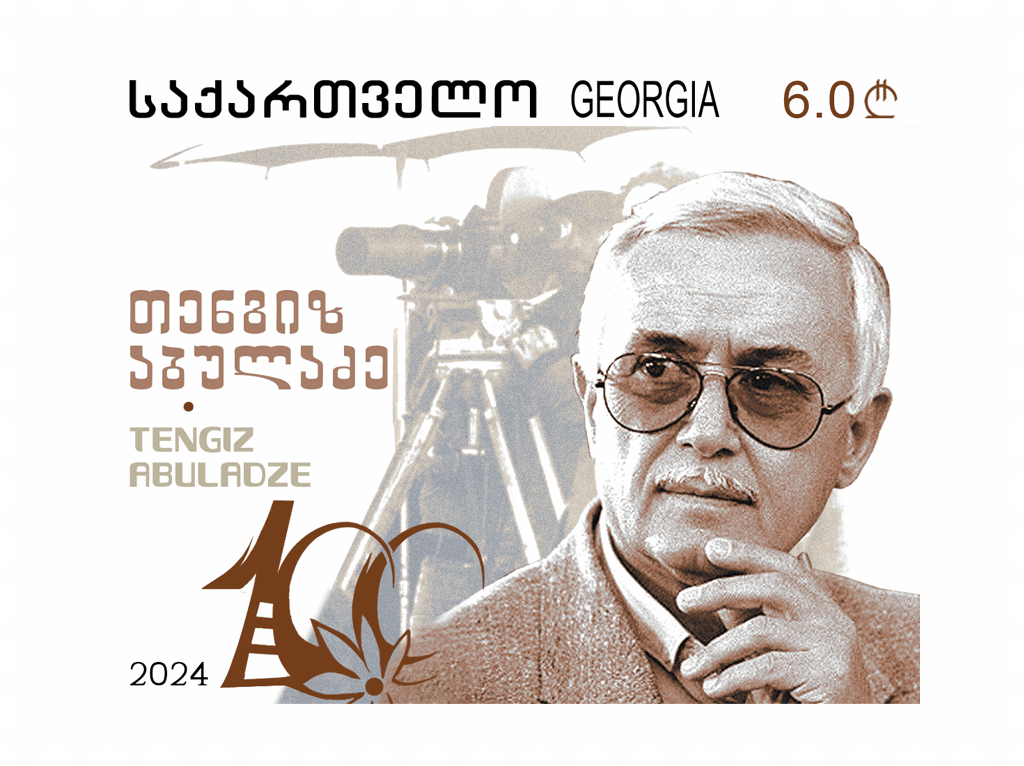
- Abuladze on a 2024 stamp of Georgia
- Born: Tengiz Evgenis dze Abuladze; 31 January 1924; Kutaisi, Georgian SSR, Transcaucasian SFSR, Soviet Union
- Died: 6 March 1994 (aged 70); Tbilisi, Georgia
- Resting place: Didube Pantheon, Tbilisi
- Years active: 1956–1988
- Notable work: The Wishing Tree (1977); Repentance (1984)
- Title: People's Artist of the USSR (1980); People's Artist of the Georgian SSR (1966)

Tengiz Evgenis dze Abuladze (Note: Georgian: თენგიზ ევგენის ძე აბულაძე, romanized: Tengiz Evgenis dze Abuladze) (Georgian: თენგიზ აბულაძე; 31 January 1924 – 6 March 1994) was a Georgian film director, screenwriter, theatre teacher and People's Artist of the USSR. He is regarded as one of the best Soviet directors.

== Biography ==
Abuladze studied theatre direction (1943–1946) at the Shota Rustaveli Theatre Institute, Tbilisi, Georgia, and filmmaking at the VGIK (All-Union State Institute of Cinematography) in Moscow. He graduated from VGIK in 1952 and in 1953 he joined Gruziya-film (Georgia Film Studios) as a director. He was awarded the title of People's Artist of the Georgian SSR in 1966 and subsequently People's Artist of the USSR in 1980.

His first film, Magdana's Donkey (1956), which he directed with Rezo Chkheidze, won the "Best Fiction Short" award at the 1956 Cannes Film Festival. He is most famous for his film trilogy: The Plea (The Supplication) (1968), The Wishing Tree (1977), and Repentance (1984, released 1987), which won him the Lenin Prize (1988) and the first Nika Award for Best Picture. Repentance won the Special Jury Prize at the 1987 Cannes Film Festival. In 1987 he was a member of the jury at the 15th Moscow International Film Festival.

Abuladze came to prominence in the Soviet Union under perestroika when his banned film Repentance, a blistering expose of the Stalinist terror, was released in 1986.

Repentance revolves around the death of an old tyrant, Varlam Aravidze, and the refusal of a woman, Ketevan Barateli, to leave his corpse in peace. She repeatedly disinters the corpse and at the trial disinters also the forbidden secrets of the past. Aravidze is universalised as Adolf Hitler, Benito Mussolini, Joseph Stalin, but most obviously as Stalin's fellow Georgian Lavrentiy Beria.

== Film career ==
Returning to Tbilisi with his fellow Georgian Revaz Chkheidze, Abuladze joined the Gruziafilm studios and together they began their career making documentary films about their country's folklore. In 1955 they made their first non-documentary film, Magdana's Donkey, which won the Best Short Film award at Cannes in 1956. Abuladze's next work was the feature-length Other People's Children (1958), a psychological portrait of life in Tbilisi. This was followed by Me, Grandma, Iliko and Ilarion (1962), a tragicomedy of morals in a mountain village, and the lyrical comedy A Necklace for My Beloved (1973).

Abuladze's reputation is, however, based on a trilogy of films that deal with fundamental questions of good and evil, love and hate, life and death. The first of these, The Plea (1968), was inspired by the poems of Vazha-Pshavela and shot in black-and-white against the severe Georgian landscape familiar from other films of the time. The second film in the trilogy, The Wishing Tree (1971), was an epic tale set in the same landscape and focusing on the hopes and reveries of a young woman and a man's search for the mythical tree that will make dreams come true. The Wishing Tree won festival prizes in Moscow, Czechoslovakia and Italy, and was awarded the State Prize of the Georgian Soviet Socialist Republic. From 1974 Abuladze taught at the Rustaveli Institute from which he had graduated three decades earlier.

In 1978 Abuladze joined the Communist Party of the Soviet Union, a normal career move at that time and in that context. In 1980 he was awarded the title People's Artist of the USSR. By now he was one of the leading Soviet Georgian filmmakers. On the surface, he was the perfect example of the Soviet cultural nomenklatura. Then in 1983–84 he made Repentance, the film (made for Georgian television) that was to catapult him to worldwide attention.

Like so many other films of the "period of stagnation", Repentance was left "on the shelf". So fearful was Abuladze that his film would be destroyed that he is reputed to have kept the only remaining copy under his bed. When Mikhail Gorbachev and glasnost arrived and the old guard in the Soviet filmmakers' union was unanimously ejected in 1986, a Conflict Commission was established to review these shelved films. With encouragement from the then-Soviet Foreign Minister, Eduard Shevardnadze, Repentance was released, first in Georgia and then across the Soviet Union, where it attracted record audiences and became the flagship film of the whole glasnost process.

== Filmography ==
Tengiz Abuladze made 12 films during his career. Five of them were documentaries and seven were fiction. His final film was going to be about Galaktion Tabidze and Ilia Chavchavadze, but it remained unfinished.

Year	English title	Original title	Length	Notes
1953	Chveni sasakhle	ჩვენი სასახლე	Unknown	Documentary
1954	Qartuli tsekvis sakhelmtsipo ansambli	ქართული ცეკვის სახელმწიფო ანსამბლი	Unknown	Documentary
1955	Dimitriy Arakishvili	დიმიტრი არაყიშვილი	Unknown	Documentary
1955	Magdana's Donkey	მაგდანას ლურჯა	63 min	
1958	Other People's Children	სხვისი შვილები	77 min	also screenplay writer with Rezo Japaridze
1962	Me, Grandma, Iliko and Ilarion	მე,ბებია,ილიკო და ილარიონი	92 min	also screenplay writer with Nodar Dumbadze. Based upon his novel Me, Grandma, Iliko and Ilarioni.
1955	Svanur-Tushuri chanakhatebi	სვანური ჩანახატები	Unknown	Documentary
1967	The Plea	ვედრება	72 min	also screenplay writer with Rezo Kveselava and Anzor Salukvadze. Based on the poems of Vazha-Pshavela – Host and Guest and Aluda Ketelauri.
1971	A Necklace for My Beloved	სამკაული ჩემი სატრფოსათვის	70 min	also screenplay writer with Akhmed Abu-Bakar and Tamaz Meliava. Based on a short story of Akhmed Abu-Bakar.
1972	Muzeumi gia tsis qvesh	მუზეუმი ღია ცის ქვეშ	Unknown	Documentary
1976	The Wishing Tree	ნატვრის ხე	87 min	also screenplay writer with Revaz Inanishvili
1984	Repentance	მონანიება	153 min	also screenplay writer with Nana Janelidze and Rezo Kveselava
