= Cinema of Georgia =

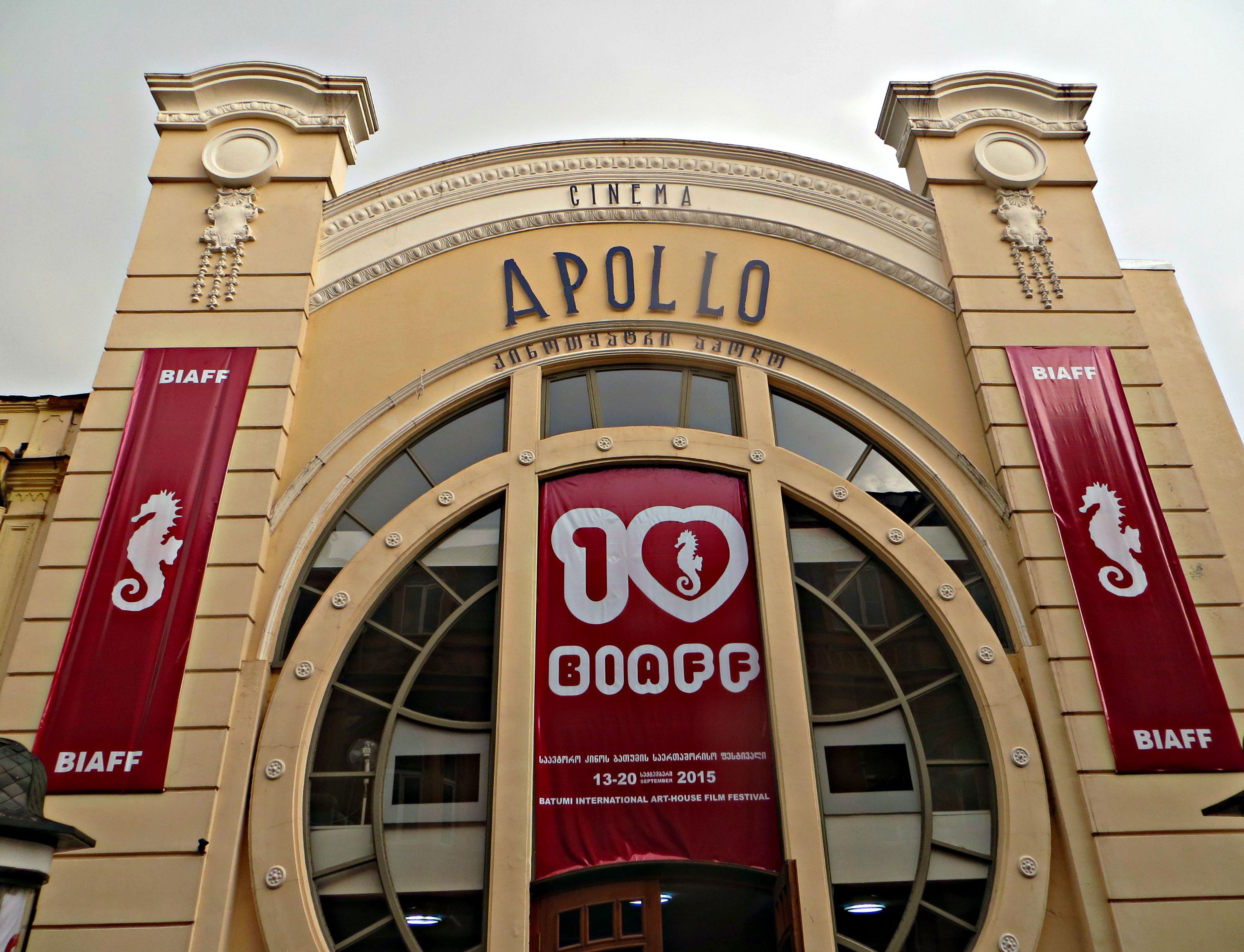
- Apollo Cinema in Batumi
- No. of screens: 23 (2017)
  - Per capita: 0.7 per 100,000 (2017)
- Main distributors: Fox (London) 25.0% Buesta Vista Song Pictures 19.0% Warner Bros 13.0%

Produced feature films (2011)
- Fictional: 12 (85.7%)
- Animated: -
- Documentary: 2 (14.3%)

Number of admissions (2010)
- Total: 144,039
- National films: 66,200 (46.0%)

Gross box office (2010)
- Total: GEL 1.25 million
- National films: GEL 626,000 (50.1%)

The cinema of Georgia has been noted for its cinematography in Europe. Italian film director Federico Fellini was an admirer of the Georgian film: "Georgian film is a completely unique phenomenon, vivid, philosophically inspiring, very wise, childlike. There is everything that can make me cry and I ought to say that it (my crying) is not an easy thing."

== Notable films ==
- 1912
  - Journey of Akaki
- 1942
  - Giorgi Saakadze
- 1947
  - Akaki's Cradle
- 1948
  - Keto and Kote
- 1955
  - Magdana's Donkey
- 1956
  - Bashi-Achuki
  - The Scrapper (film)
- 1958
  - Mamluk
- 1959
  - Maia of Tskneti
- 1960
  - Groom without a Diploma
- 1961
  - The Story of a Destitute
- 1962
  - Me, Grandma, Iliko and Ilarion
- 1964
  - Father of a Soldier
  - Khevisberi Gocha
- 1965
  - Another Time
- 1968
  - Unusual Exhibition
- 1969
  - The Right Hand of the Grand Master
  - Don't Grieve
  - Pirosmani
- 1970
  - Feola
  - Kvevri (film)
- 1973
  - Stealing the Moon
  - The Eccentrics
  - Melodies of Vera Quarter
- 1975
  - The First Swallow
- 1976
  - The Wishing Tree
- 1977
  - Butterfly
  - Mimino
  - Racha, My Love!
  - Stepmother of Samanishvili
- 1978
  - Data Tutashkhia
- 1979
  - Imeretian Sketches
- 1980
  - An Unserious Man
  - Everyone Needs Love (film)
- 1982
  - Kukaracha
- 1983
  - Blue Mountains
- 1984
  - Chiora
- 1987
  - Repentance
- 1990
  - The White Banners
- 1992
  - The Sun of the Sleepless
- 1994
  - Iavnana
- 1996
  - A Chef in Love
- 1998
  - The Lake
- 1999
  - Here Comes the Dawn
- 2000
  - 27 Missing Kisses
- 2001
  - The Migration of the Angel
- 2005
  - A trip to Karabakh
  - Tbilisi, Tbilisi
- 2007
  - The Russian Triangle
- 2008
  - Three Houses
  - Mediator
- 2009
  - The Other Bank
- 2010
  - Street Days
  - Chantrapas
- 2011
  - Salt White
  - Born in Georgia
  - The Watchmaker
- 2012
  - Keep Smiling
- 2013
  - Tangerines
  - Blind Dates
  - In Bloom
- 2014
  - Corn Island
  - Brides
  - Tbilisi, I Love You
  - Line of Credit
  - My Wife's Girlfriends in Cinema
- 2015
  - Moira
  - God of Happiness
  - The Village
  - The Summer of Frozen Fountains
- 2016
  - House of Others
  - Khibula
- 2017
  - My Happy Family
  - Scary Mother
  - Hostages
  - Dede
  - Namme
- 2019
  - And Then We Danced
- 2024
  - Panopticon

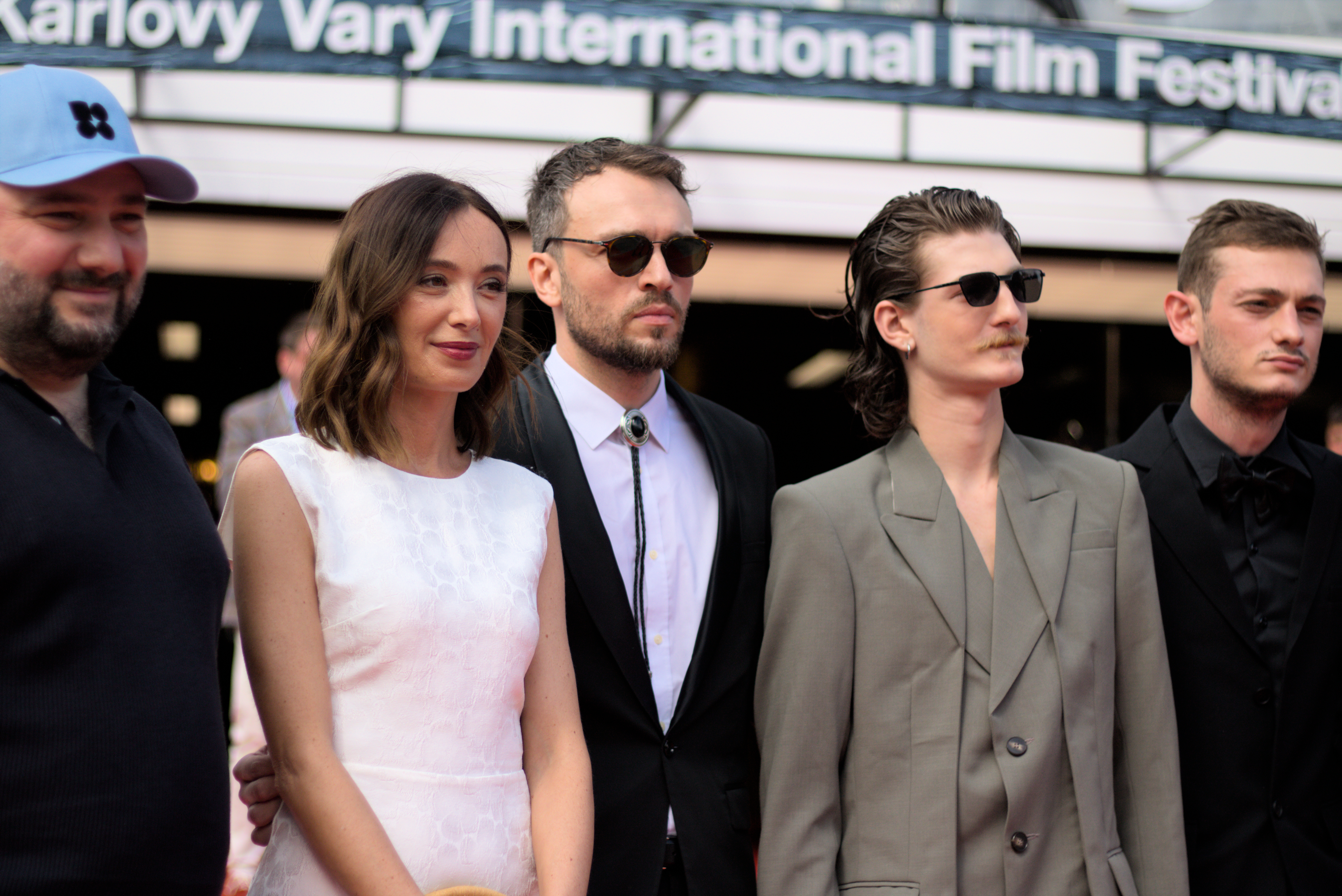
Cast of Panopticon at the 58th Karlovy Vary International Film Festival

== Notable filmmakers ==
Georgian cinematography's reputation has been built by known cinema directors such as:

- Vasil Amashukeli
- Alexandre Tsutsunava
- Nikoloz Shengelaia
- Mikheil Chiaureli
- Mikhail Kalatozov
- Revaz Chkheidze
- Tengiz Abuladze
- Eldar Shengelaia
- Giorgi Shengelaia
- Otar Ioseliani
- Mikheil Kobakhidze
- Sergei Parajanov
- Lana Gogoberidze
- Goderdzi Chokheli
- Temur Babluani
- Dito Tsintsadze
- Nana Jorjadze
- Zaza Urushadze
- Giorgi Ovashvili
- Levan Koguashvili
- Nana Ekvtimishvili
- Rusudan Chkonia
- Zaza Rusadze

From 2012, the main focus of Georgian cinema is supporting script writing and European co-productions.

== See also ==
- Cinema of the world
- List of Georgian submissions for the Academy Award for Best Foreign Language Film

== Bibliography ==
- Lauren Ninoshvili, Ph.D.: Singing between the Words: The Poetics of Georgian Polyphony, New York: Columbia University, 2011, ISBN 978-1-124-33459-2
