= List of Georgian films of the 2010s =

This is a list of the films produced in the cinema of Georgia in the 2010s, ordered by year of release:

Title	Director	Cast	Genre	Studio/notes
2010
Chantrapas	Otar Iosseliani		Drama	
Street Days	Levan Koguashvili		Drama	
2011
Born in Georgia	Tamar Shavgulidze		Drama	
Salt White	Keti Machavariani		Drama	
The Watchmaker	Giorgi Maskharashvili		Crime	
2012
Keep Smiling	Rusudan Chkonia		Comedy	
2013
In Bloom	Nana Ekvtimishvili, Simon Gross		Drama	
Blind Dates	Levan Koguashvili		Drama	
2015
Moira	Levan Tutberidze		Drama	
2016
House of Others	Rusudan Glurjidze		Drama	
2017
My Happy Family	Nana Ekvtimishvili, Simon Groß		Drama	
