= GoEast =

Annual film festival in Germany

GoEast, styled goEast, is an international film festival which has been held annually in the Hessian state capital of Wiesbaden, Germany, since its inception in 2001. The festival is primarily for films with an Eastern European background, and is held by the Deutsches Filminstitut (German Film Institute) for one week every April.

== History ==
The goEast film festival, launched in 2001, was founded by Claudia Dillmann, the Director of the German Film Institute – DIF. Likewise involved in developing the original festival concept was Swetlana Sikora, who has remained the festival's Artist Director until 2010. "The time has come to open ourselves to the thoughts, images, myths and stories of our Eastern neighbours. To their culture. To their films.", wrote Claudia Dillmann in her foreword to the first festival catalogue.

From the beginning, the state capital Wiesbaden and the state government of Hesse has given substantial support to the festival, as it made its home in the Caligari cinemas. Hilmar Hoffmann became patron of the festival.

In late summer 2010 Gaby Babic took over the post of Festival Director, and for the first time a combined role as Artistic Director as well. After Claudia Dillmann, Christine Kopf and Nadja Rademacher she is the fourth front woman of goEast.

The 2021 festival took place in April, mainly online, as well as in the cities of Frankfurt, Darmstadt and Giessen.

Directors and stars who have been guests at the festival includes Krzysztof Zanussi, Jiří Menzel, István Szabó, Hanna Schygulla, Béla Tarr, Jerzy Stuhr, Kira Muratova, Otar Iosseliani, Maria Schrader, Joachim Król, Sergei Loznitsa, Bohdan Sláma, Cristi Puiu and many more.

== Sections ==
=== Competition ===
Ten feature films and six documentaries are nominated for the goEast Competition. Eligibility is restricted to productions completed within the past two years in the applicable countries; in addition, since 2008 documentaries made in Germany or Israel may be nominated if they possess clear thematic relevance to Central and Eastern Europe.

=== Symposium ===
The annual goeast Symposium invites (film) scholars, historians and specialists to examine socially relevant topics within the context of historical artistic developments. This section is built around interdisciplinary debate encompassing a range of aesthetic and theoretical perspectives, and is accompanied by a separately curated series of films. All lectures, discussions and screenings are open to the general public.

=== Young Professionals Programme ===
The goeast Students' Competition presents work by young filmmakers from East and West. The BHF-BANK Foundation finances three audience prizes worth 1,000 EUR respectively as well as an adjudicated supporting prize (1,500 EUR) for the best short film from an Eastern European film school. Since 2007, goEast has hosted the presentation of the Co-Production award of the Robert Bosch Stiftung, which offers support to three projects involving the cooperation of young filmmakers from Eastern and Southeastern Europe as well as from Germany. Awarded in cooperation with ARTE, a grant of up to 70,000 EUR goes to one outstanding project proposal in each of the three categories Documentary, Animation, and Short Film. With a week-long programme geared towards exchange of experience and provision of support for joint proposals, the annual Project Market fosters networking among young filmmakers from Eastern Europe and Germany. The workshops and discussions held during the goeast Young Professionals programme allow upcoming filmmakers to profit from the experience of renowned commissioning editors, producers and directors.

=== Homage/Portrait ===
Dedicated to Otar Iosseliani, Kira Muratova or Sergei Parajanov one year, to Jan Svěrák, Benedek Fliegauf or Fatmir Koci the next – this alternating festival slot pays tribute to the achievements of established masters or highlights the inspiring careers of contemporary filmmakers or actors.

=== Beyond Belonging ===
Beyond Belonging is open to productions from countries outside Central and Eastern Europe but bearing a clear relation to the region.

=== Highlights ===
This section presents hand-picked highlights of Central and Eastern European mainstream cinema.

=== Specials ===
Special events include film archives, school film days, concerts and closing parties.

== Awards ==
An international jury chooses the recipients of the Škoda Prize (10,000 EUR) – the “Golden Lily” – for Best Film, the "Remembrance and Future" documentary prize (10,000 EUR), the prize for Best Director (7,500 EUR) from the City of Wiesbaden, and the prize (2,000 EUR) from the Federal Foreign Office of Germany. A jury dispatched by FIPRESCI awards the International Film Critics' Prize.

- Award winners

=== ŠKODA Film Award (prize name changed in 2013) ===
- 2013 - In Bloom By Nana Ekvtimishvili and Simon Groß

=== The ŠKODA Award "The Golden Lily" for Best Film ===
- 2026 - Clouds Move with Great Speed by Roman Ostrovskyi
- 2025 - Holy Electricity by Tato Kotetishvili
- 2024 - Silence of Reason by Kumjana Novakova
- 2023 - Remember to Blink by Austėja Urbaitė
- 2022 - Vera Dreams of the Sea by Kaltrina Krasniqi
- 2021 - This Rain Will Never Stop by Alina Gorlova
- 2020 - Rounds by Stephan Komandarev
- 2019 - Acid by Aleksandr Gorchilin
- 2018 - November by Rainer Sarnet
- 2017 - Requiem for Mrs J. by Bojan Vuletić
- 2016 - Insight by Aleksandr Kott
- 2015 - No One's Child by Vuk Ršumović
- 2014 - Ida by Paweł Pawlikowski
- 2013 - In Bloom by Nana Ekvtimishvili & Simon Groß
- 2012 - Living By Vassily Sigarev
- 2011 - A Stoker By Alexei Balabanov
- 2010 - Street Days By Levan Koguashvili
- 2009 - The Other Bank By George Ovashvili
- 2008 - Magnus By Kadri Kõusaar
- 2007 - Euphoria By Ivan Vyrypaev
- 2006 - Tbilisi-tbilisi By Levan Zakarejšvili
- 2005 - The Tuner By Kira Muratova
- 2004 - Roads to Koktebel By Boris Khlebnikov and Aleksei Popogrebski
- 2003 - The Key to Determining Dwarfs, Or The Last Travel of Lemuel Gulliver By Martin Šulík
- 2002 - Hi, Tereska By Robert Gliński
- 2001 - The Big Animal By Jerzy Stuhr and Second Class-people By Kira Muratova

=== Award For Best Director Donated By The City Of Wiesbaden ===
- 2026 - Sorella di Clausura by Ivana Mladenović
- 2025 - The Black Hole by Moonika Siimets
- 2024 - Stepne by Maryna Vroda
- 2023 - Parade by Titus Laucius
- 2022 - Gentle by Anna Nemes and László Csuja
- 2021 - Bebia, à mon seul désir by Juja Dobrachkous
- 2020 - Nova Lituania by Karolis Kaupinis
- 2019 - The Gentle Indifference of the World by Adilkhan Yerzhanov
- 2018 - A Woman Captured by Bernadett Tuza-Ritter
- 2016 - The Red Spider by Marcin Koszałka
- 2015 - Koza by Ivan Ostrochovský
- 2014 - Blind Dates by Levan Koguashvili
- 2013 - Circles By Srdan Golubović
- 2012 - AVÉ By Konstantin Bojanov
- 2011 - Morgen By Marian Crişan
- 2010 - Days of Desire By József Pacskovszky
- 2009 - Help Gone Mad By Boris Khlebnikov
- 2008 - Love and Other Crimes By Stefan Arsenijević
- 2007 - The Trap By Srdan Golubović
- 2006 - Garpastum By Aleksei German Jr.
- 2005 - Stranger By Małgorzata Szumowska
- 2004 - Dealer By Benedek Fliegauf
- 2003 - Ballroom Dancing By Lívia Gyarmathy
- 2002 - The Last Supper By Vojka Anzeljc
- 2001 - Passport By Péter Gothár

=== Documentary Award – “Remembrance And Future” Of The Foundation Evz (since 2008) ===
- 2013 - Anton's right here By Lyubov Arkus
- 2012 - Revision By Philip Scheffner
- 2011 - The Last Day Of Summer By Piotr Stasik
- 2010 - OJ Mama Von orna Ben Dor By Noa Maiman
- 2009 - I Love Poland By joanna Sławińska And Maria Zmarz-koczanowicz
- 2008 - The Flower Bridge By Thomas Ciulei

=== Documentary Award By The Hertie Foundation (until 2007) ===
- 2007 - How to Do It by Marcel Łoziński
- 2006 - Facing the Day by Ivona Juka
- 2005 - Pretty Dyana by Boris Mitić
- 2004 - Alphabet of Hope by Stephan Komandarev
- 2003 - Bread Over the Fence by Stephan Komandarev
- 2002 - Joy of Life by Svetozar Ristovski

=== Award Of The Federal Foreign Office For “Artistic Originality Which Creates Cultural Diversity” ===
- 2021 - How I Became a Partisan by Vera Lacková
- 2020 - Immortal by Ksenia Okhapkina
- 2019 - Home Games by Alisa Kovalenko
- 2018 - The Other Side of Everything by Mila Turajlić
- 2016 - Not My Job by Denis Shabaev
- 2015 - Logbook Serbistan by Želimir Žilnik
- 2014 - Little Brother by Serik Aprymov
- 2013 - Celestial Wives of the Meadow Mari By Aleksey Fedorchenko
- 2012 - Mother’s Paradise By Aktan Arym Kubat
- 2011 - Gorelovka By Alexander Kviria
- 2010 - How I Ended This Summer By Alexei Popogrebski
- 2009 - Morphia By Alexei Balabanov
- 2008 - At The River By Eva Nejman
- 2007 - Armin By Ognjen Sviličić
- 2006 - Death Rode Out Of Persia By Putyi Horváth
