= List of Georgian films =

This is a list of the most notable films produced by the cinema of Georgia, ordered according to decade of release.

- List of Georgian films before 1920
- List of Georgian films of the 1920s
- List of Georgian films of the 1930s
- List of Georgian films of the 1940s
- List of Georgian films of the 1950s
- List of Georgian films of the 1960s
- List of Georgian films of the 1970s
- List of Georgian films of the 1980s
- List of Georgian films of the 1990s
- List of Georgian films of the 2000s
- List of Georgian films of the 2010s
- List of Georgian films of the 2020s

== See also ==
- List of Georgian actors
