= List of Georgian submissions for the Academy Award for Best International Feature Film =

Best International Feature Film submissions from Georgia

Highlights
- Debut: 1996
- Submissions: 25
- Nominations: 1
- Oscar winners: none

Georgia has submitted twenty films for Oscar consideration in the Academy Award for Best International Feature Film (Note: The category was previously named the Academy Award for Best Foreign Language Film, but this was changed to the Academy Award for Best International Feature Film in April 2019, after the Academy deemed the word "Foreign" to be outdated.) category since 1996.

As of 2026, Georgia has been nominated once, for A Chef in Love (1996).

== Submissions ==
The Academy of Motion Picture Arts and Sciences has invited the film industries of various countries to submit their best film for the Academy Award for Best International Feature Film since 1956. The International Feature Film Committee oversees the process and reviews all the submitted films. Following this, they vote via secret ballot to determine the five nominees for the award.

Repentance (1987) was the only Georgian film selected to represent the Soviet Union in the category, but it was not nominated.

Corn Island (2014) advanced to the December shortlists, but it was not nominated.

Most of the films submitted are primary in Georgian. Below is a list of Georgian submissions for consideration to the Academy of Motion Picture Arts and Sciences.

Year^{[e]} (Ceremony)	Film title used in nomination	Original title	Language(s)	Director	Result
1996 (69th)	A Chef in Love	შეყვარებული მზარეულის 1001 რეცეპტი	French, Georgian	Nana Jorjadze	Nominated
1999 (72nd)	Here Comes the Dawn	აქ თენდება	Georgian	Zaza Urushadze	Not nominated
2000 (73rd)	27 Missing Kisses	27 დაკარგული კოცნა	Georgian, Russian	Nana Jorjadze	Not nominated
2001 (74th)	The Migration of the Angel	ანგელოზის გადაფრენა	Georgian	Nodar Managadze	Not nominated
2005 (78th)	Tbilisi-Tbilisi	თბილისი-თბილისი	Georgian	Levan Zaqareishvili	Not nominated
2007 (80th)	The Russian Triangle	რუსული სამკუთხედი	Russian	Aleko Tsabadze	Not nominated
2008 (81st)	Mediator	მედიატორი	English, German, Russian	Dito Tsintsadze	Not nominated
2009 (82nd)	The Other Bank	გაღმა ნაპირი	Georgian, Abkhaz, Russian	Giorgi Ovashvili	Not nominated
2010 (83rd)	Street Days	ქუჩის დღეები	Georgian	Levan Koguashvili	Not nominated
2011 (84th)	Chantrapas	შანტრაპა	French, Georgian	Otar Iosseliani	Not nominated
2012 (85th)	Keep Smiling	გაიღიმეთ	Georgian	Rusudan Chkonia	Not nominated
2013 (86th)	In Bloom	გრძელი ნათელი დღეები	Georgian	Nana Ekvtimishvili, Simon Groß	Not nominated
2014 (87th)	Corn Island	სიმინდის კუნძული	Georgian	Giorgi Ovashvili	Made shortlist
2015 (88th)	Moira	მოირა	Georgian	Levan Tutberidze	Not nominated
2016 (89th)	House of Others	სხვისი სახლი	Georgian	Rusudan Glurjidze	Not nominated
2017 (90th)	Scary Mother	საშიში დედა	Georgian	Ana Urushadze	Not nominated
2018 (91st)	Namme	ნამე	Georgian	Zaza Khalvashi	Not nominated
2019 (92nd)	Shindisi	შინდისი	Georgian	Dito Tsintsadze	Not nominated
2020 (93rd)	Beginning	დასაწყისი	Georgian	Déa Kulumbegashvili	Not nominated
2021 (94th)	Brighton 4th	მეოთხე ბრაიტონი	Georgian	Levan Koguashvili	Not nominated
2022 (95th)	A Long Break	დიდი შესვენება	Georgian	Davit Pirtskhalava	Not nominated
2023 (96th)	Citizen Saint	მოქალაქე წმინდანი	Georgian	Tinatin Kajrishvili	Not nominated
2024 (97th)	The Antique	ანტიკვარიატი	Georgian, Russian	Rusudan Glurjidze	Not nominated
2025 (98th)	Panopticon	პანოპტიკონი	Georgian	George Sikharulidze	Not nominated
2026 (99th)	Guria	გურია	Georgian	Levan Koguashvili	Pending

== Notes ==
a^{1} : Each year is linked to an article about that particular year in film history.

== See also ==
- List of Soviet submissions for the Academy Award for Best International Feature Film
