= 2022 Red Sea International Film Festival =

Film festival in Jeddah, Saudi Arabia

Red Sea International Film Festival مهرجان البحر الأحمر السينمائي الدولي
- Location: Arbaeen lagoon, Al Madinah Al Munawarah Road, old town Jeddah, Saudi Arabia
- Founded: 2019
- Awards: The Yusr Awards
- Film titles: 138 from 67 countries
- Hosted by: Red Sea Film Festival Foundation
- Festival date: 1 December 2022–10 December 2022
- Language: Arabic; English
- Website: RSFF

Red Sea International Film Festival
- 2023 2021

The 2022 Red Sea International Film Festival took place from December 1–10, 2022 in Jeddah, Saudi Arabia. It screened 131 films and shorts from 61 countries in 41 languages. The main competition jury president was Oliver Stone, the American film maker.

The Red Sea Souk — a related industry marketplace with a focus on the Middle East, Africa and South Asia — took place concurrently December 3–6, 2025 at the Ritz Carlton Hotel.

== Juries ==
The 2022 Red Sea International Film Festival had three juries, adding VR from the inaugural year.

=== Features competition ===
- Oliver Stone, American film director, screenwriter and documentarian – Jury President
- Nelly Karim, Egyptian actress and former prima ballerina
- Kaouther Ben Hania, Tunisian film director
- Levan Koguashvili, Georgian film director and screenwriter
- Ali Suleiman, Palestinian actor

=== Shorts competition ===
- Joana Hadjithomas and Khalil Joreige, Lebanese filmmakers and visual artists
- Shahad Ameen, Saudi Arabian writer and director
- Ozzy Agu, Nigerian actor, red-carpet host and TV presenter

=== VR competition ===
- May Abdalla, British–Egyptian immersive story director
- Naima Karim, Bangladeshi–Dutch painter and VR artist
- Ana Brzezinska, Polish XR curator and creative producer

== Official Selection ==
=== In Competition ===
The 2022 edition had 16 film in competition.

English title	Original title	Director(s)	Production country
Before Now and Then		Kamila Andini	Indonesia
A Childless Village	قرية بلا أطفال	Reza Jamali	Iran
Dirty Difficult Dangerous	حديد نحاس بطاريات	Wissam Charaf	Lebanon, France
Hanging Gardens		Ahmed Yassin Al Daradji	Iraq, Palestine, Saudi Arabia, Egypt, United Kingdom
Harka		Lotfy Nathan	Tunisia
Last Film Show		Pan Nalin	India
Mountain Onion		Eldar Shibanov	Kazakhstan, China
Next Sohee	다음 소희	July Jung	South Korea
Nezouh		Soudade Kaadan	Syria, France
Our Lady Of The Chinese Shop		Ery Claver	Angola
Raven Song		Mohamed Al Salman	Saudi Arabia
A Summer in Boujad		Omar Mouldouira	Morocco, France
The Last Queen	الملكة الأخيرة	Damien Ounouri and Adila Bendimerad	Algeria, France, Taiwan
The Pit	The Pit	Angela Wanjiku	Kenya
Within Sand	فلم بين الرمال	Moe Alatawi	Saudi Arabia
