= List of Georgian films of the 2000s =

A list of the films produced in the cinema of Georgia in the 2000s, ordered by year of release:

Title	Director	Cast	Genre	Studio/notes
2000
2001
The Migration of the Angel	Nodar Managadze		Drama	
2002
2003
2004
2005
13 Tzameti	Géla Babluani			
A trip to Karabakh				
2006
The Legacy	Géla Babluani and Temur Babluani			
2007
Deshantori				
The Russian Triangle	Aleko Tsabadze			Entered into the 29th Moscow International Film Festival
2008
Three Houses				
