= Guria (film) =

2026 Georgian comedy-drama film

- Promotional teaser poster
- Georgian: გურია
- Directed by: Levan Koguashvili
- Written by: Boris Frumin; Giorgi Kekelidze; Levan Koguashvili
- Produced by: Kanat Dogramaci; Levan Koguashvili; Olena Yershova; Stefan Kitanov
- Starring: Kakhaber Tcholadze; Natia Nikolaishvili; Vamekh Jangidze; Davit Natsvaladze; Anamaria Kamladze; Sergi Kviloria
- Cinematography: Gigi Samsonadze; Giorgi Shvelidze
- Edited by: Pia Dumont
- Music by: Giorgi Gordeladze
- Production companies: Kino Iberica; Cineworx Filmproduktion GmbH; Tarantula Luxembourg; Art Fest
- Distributed by: Cineworx GmbH Distribution
- Release date: 9 September 2026 (Venice)
- Running time: 118 minutes
- Countries: Georgia; Switzerland; Luxembourg; Bulgaria; Norway; Saudi Arabia; Turkey
- Language: Georgian

Guria (Georgian: გურია) is a 2026 comedy-drama film directed by Levan Koguashvili, and co-written with Boris Frumin and Giorgi Kekelidze. Set in 1992 in a post-Soviet Georgian village plagued by poverty and power outages, it follows a stubborn widowed hazelnut farmer as he fights for a fair price for his harvest, and a second chance at love.

The film had its world premiere in the Venice Spotlight section of the 83rd Venice International Film Festival on 9 September 2026. It was also selected as the Georgian entry for the Best International Feature Film at the 99th Academy Awards.

== Synopsis ==
In the Guria region, following the dissolution of the Soviet Union, prosperity remains out of reach in rural region of western Georgia. Electricity is unreliable, and police officers steal trolleybus cables to sell as scrap. Zuriko, a 45-year-old widowed hazelnut farmer, refuses to accept the low prices offered by Italian buyers and asks his best friend Gela to help him find better deals. Gela also tries to help Zuriko find a new wife, but the women he meets fail to impress his demanding former mother-in-law. After surviving a robbery on the highway, Zuriko becomes interested in Maya, the village music teacher. At the same time, Zuriko's son Achi faces a romantic disappointment when Eka, the girl he loves marries his rival, Besso. As Zuriko and his family struggle with everyday life, Guria becomes a place where economic hardship, violence, romance, and beauty exist side by side.

== Cast ==
- Kakhaber Tcholadze as Zuriko
- Natia Nikolaishvili as Maia
- Vamekh Jangidze as Gela
- Davit Natsvaladze as Beso
- Anamaria Kamladze as Eka
- Sergi Kviloria as Achi

== Production ==
Principal photography began on 23 October 2024 at locations in Guria, Georgia. Filming ended on 15 May 2025 after shooting in Georgia.

In December 2024, the project was selected in Red Sea Souk Works in Progress, industry sidebar of the Red Sea International Film Festival. The work-in-progress was presented at the pitching sessions and was evaluated by three different juries. In January 2026, the film participated in First Cut Lab 2026.

== Release ==
Guria had its world premiere in the Venice Spotlight section of the 83rd Venice International Film Festival on 9 September 2026.

It was screened in Signature section of the Zurich Film Festival on 30 September 2026.

It will be screened as part of 'Visions of the East' at the Arras Film Festival on 10 November 2026.

== Accolades ==
Award	Date of ceremony	Category	Recipient(s)	Result	Ref.
Venice International Film Festival	12 September 2026	Armani Beauty Audience Award (Venice Spotlight)	Guria	Nominated	
Asia Pacific Screen Awards	30 October 2026	Best Film	Guria	Won	
Asia Pacific Screen Awards	30 October 2026	Best Cinematography	Gigi Samsonadze and Giorgi Shvelidze	Nominated	

== See also ==
- List of submissions to the 99th Academy Awards for Best International Feature Film
- List of Georgian submissions for the Academy Award for Best International Feature Film
