= 2023 Red Sea International Film Festival =

Film festival in Jeddah, Saudi Arabia

Red Sea International Film Festival مهرجان البحر الأحمر السينمائي الدولي
- Location: Jeddah, Saudi Arabia
- Founded: 2019
- Hosted by: Red Sea Film Festival Foundation
- Festival date: 30 November 2022–9 December 2022
- Language: Arabic; English
- Website: RSFF

Red Sea International Film Festival
- 2024 2022

The 2023 Red Sea International Film Festival took place from November 30 to December 9, 2023, in Jeddah, Saudi Arabia, and marked the third edition of the film festival. The Red Sea jury was headed by Baz Luhrmann; it selected 17 films from Asia, Africa, and the Arab world for competition. In Flames, directed Zarrar Kahn, won the Golden Yusr for best feature film.

In addition to screening films for competition, the film festival also hosted talks and discussions, galas and parties, and other events for the industry, most of which were held at the Ritz-Carlton.

== Jury ==
=== Features ===
- Baz Luhrmann
- Joel Kinnaman
- Freida Pinto
- Amina Khalil
- Paz Vega

=== Shorts ===
- Hana Alomair
- Assaad Bouab
- Fatih Akin

== Official selection ==
The festival lineup was announced on November 6, 2023.

=== Red Sea International Film Festival: In Competition ===
Title	Director(s)	Production country
Inshallah a Boy	Ahmjad Al Rashid	Jordan, Saudi Arabia, Egypt, France, Qatar
Behind the Mountains	Mohamed Ben Attia	Tunisia, France, Belgium, Italy, Saudi Arabia, Qatar
Norah	Tawfik Alzaidi	Saudi Arabia
Backstage	Afef Ben Mahmoud, Khalil Benkirane	Morocco, Tunisia, Belgium, France, Qatar, Norway, Saudi Arabia
The Teacher	Farah Nabulsi	United Kingdom, Palestine, Qatar
Dalma	Humaid Alsuwaidi	United Arab Emirates
Mandoob	Ali Kalthami	Saudi Arabia
Six Feet Over	Karim Bensalah	Algeria, France
Dear Jassi	Tarsem Singh Dhandwar	India
In Flames	Zarrar Kahn	Pakistan, Canada
Wakhri	Iram Parveen Bilal	Pakistan, United States
Sunday	Shokir Kholikov	Uzbekistan
Tiger Stripes	Amanda Nell Eu	Malaysia, Taiwan, Singapore, France, Germany, Netherlands, Indonesia, Qatar
Roxana	Parviz Shahbazi	Iran
Omen	Baloji	Belgium, Netherlands, Democratic Republic of the Congo
Evil Does Not Exist	Ryusuke Hamaguchi	Japan

=== Special Screenings ===
Title	Director(s)	Production country
To My Son	Dhaffer L'Abidine	Saudi Arabia, United Arab Emirates
Jeanne du Barry	Maïwenn	France, Saudi Arabia

=== Red Sea International Film Festival: Arab Spectacular ===
Title	Director(s)	Production country
Four Daughters	Kaouther Ben Hania	France, Saudi Arabia, Germany, Tunisia
Hajjan	Abu Bakr Shawky	Saudi Arabia, Egypt
Khaled El Sheikh Between Two Fires, Art and Politics	Jamal Kutbi	Saudi Arabia
Fever Dream	Farus Godis	Saudi Arabia
Three	Nayla Al Khaja	United Arab Emirates, Thailand
HWJN	Yasir Alyasiri	Saudi Arabia, United Arab Emirates
Back to Alexandria	Tamer Ruggli	France, Switzerland, Egypt
NAGA	Meshal Aljaser	Saudi Arabia
Shamareekh	Amr Salama	Egypt
Yesterday After Tomorrow	Abdulghani Alsaigh	Saudi Arabia
A Nose and Three Eyes	Amir Ramses	Egypt, United Arab Emirates
I Am Al-Ittihad	Hamza Tarzan	Saudi Arabia

== Awards ==
Award	Winner
Golden Yusr Award—Best Feature Film	In Flames, dir. Zarrar Kahn
Silver Yusr Award—Best Feature Film	Dear Jassi, dir. Tarsem Singh
Film AlUla Audience Award—Best Film	Hopeless, dir. Kim Chang-hoon
Film AlUla Audience Award—Best Saudi Film	Norah, dir. Tawfik Alzaidi
Best Documentary	Four Daughters, dir. Kaouther Ben Hania
Chopard Rising Talent Trophy	Nour Alkhadra
Best Cinematic Contribution	Omen, dir. Baloji
Best Actor	Saleh Bakri in The Teacher
Best Actress	Mouna Hawa in Inshallah a Boy
Best Screenplay	Six Feet Over, written by Karim Bensalah and Jamal Belmahi
Best Director	Shokir Kholikov for Sunday
Jury Prize	Farah Nabulsi for The Teacher
Red Sea Honorary Award	Nicolas Cage
Golden Yusr—Best Short Film	Somewhere in Between, dir. Dahlia Nemlich
Silver Yusr—Best Short Film	Suitcase, dir. Saman Hosseinpuor and Ako Zandkarimi
