= 2021 Red Sea International Film Festival =

Film festival in Jeddah, Saudi Arabia

Red Sea International Film Festival مهرجان البحر الأحمر السينمائي الدولي
- Opening film: Cyrano, directed by Joe Wright
- Closing film: 83, directed by Kabir Khan
- Location: Arbaeen lagoon, Al Madinah Al Munawarah Road, old town Jeddah, Saudi Arabia
- Founded: 2019
- Awards: The Yusr Awards
- Film titles: 138 from 67 countries
- Hosted by: Red Sea Film Festival Foundation
- Festival date: Opening: 6 December 2021; Closing: 15 December 2021
- Language: Arabic; English
- Website: RSFF

Red Sea International Film Festival
- 2022 None

The 2021 Red Sea International Film Festival was the inaugural edition a film festival in the Middle East established by the Saudi Arabian government and set in Jeddah, Saudi Arabia. The winner of the Best Film in competition was Brighton 4th (მეოთხე ბრაიტონი), directed by Levan Koguashvili.

The creation of a film festival was considered significant as cinema was officially banned in Saudi Arabia until reforms under Crown Prince Mohammed bin Salman lifted restrictions with a screening of Marvel's Black Panther in April 2018. The Saudi Film Commission then announced a strategy designed to grow the film industry's revenue to $500 million.

The event came after several boycott calls by the critics, who warned that the Saudi authorities were attempting to divert the international attention from the country's poor human rights records. The Kingdom was being accused of using culture to whitewash its image at a global level. One of the critics said that without freedom of speech, the festival descended into propaganda.

The festival was originally conceived in 2019 with a plan to host the first festival in April 2020. However the COVID-19 pandemic pushed back the start by more than a year.’

== Red Sea Souk ==
The Red Sea Souk, an industry marketplace, took place concurrently, attracting over 3,000 professionals. The Souk showcases a number of projects from the Middle East, Africa and other regions to connect them with support and financing. Of the Red Sea Souk slate from 2021, 10 of them were selected for international festivals — including Cannes Film Festival, Venice Film Festival and Locarno Film Festival.

== Juries ==
=== Features competition ===
- Giuseppe Tornatore, Italian director and screenwriter – Jury President
- Hend Sabry, Tunisian actress
- Cherien Dabis, Palestinian-American director, writer, actor and producer
- Daniela Michel, Mexican festival director and founder of the Morelia International Film Festival
- Abdulaziz Alshlahei, Saudi film director

=== Shorts competition ===
- Marwan Hamed, Egyptian director – Jury President
- Ahd Kamel, Saudi Arabian actress and director
- Khadar Ayderus, Finnish-Somali director and writer

== Official Selection ==
The festival screened 138 films from 67 countries with 16 films in the competition section.

It opened on 6 December 2021 with Joe Wright's Cyrano and closed on 15 December with the world premiere of Kabir Khan's film 83.

Red Sea Competition

English title	Original title	Director(s)	Production country
Brighton 4th	მეოთხე ბრაიტონი	Levan Koguashvili	Georgia, Russia, Bulgaria, United States, Monaco
Communion	قربان (Qorban)	Nejib Belkadhi	Tunisia
PAKA (River of Blood)	പാകാ (നദിയുടെ രക്തം)	Nithin Lukose	India
Huda's Salon	صالون هدى	Hany Abu-Assad	Palestine, Netherlands, Germany, Qatar, Egypt
Soula	سولا	Salah Issaad	Algeria, France
Europa	Europa	Haider Rashid	Iraq, Italy, Kuwait
Yuni	Yuni	Kamila Andini	Indonesia, Singapore, France, Australia
Saloum	Saloum	Jean Luc Herbulot	Senegal, France
Rupture	تمزُّق	Hamzah K. Jamjoom	Saudi Arabia
Rehana Maryam Noor	রেহানা মরিয়ম নূর	Abdullah Mohammad Saad	Bangladesh, Singapore, Qatar
Hit the Road	جاده خاکی	Panah Panahi	Iran
Life Suits Me Well	La vie me va bien	Al Hadi Ulad-Mohand	Morocco, France
Neighbours	Neighbours	Mano Khalil	Syria, Switzerland
Farha	فرحة	Darin J Sallam	Jordan
Sharaf	شرف	Samir Nasr	Germany, Tunisia, Egypt, Sweden, Luxembourg
The Alleys	الحارة	Bassel Ghandour	Jordan, Saudi Arabia, Qatar

== Official Awards ==
Winners

Award	Film	Original title	Director(s)	Production country
Best Film	Brighton 4th	მეოთხე ბრაიტონი	Levan Koguashvili	Georgia, Russia, Bulgaria, United States, Monaco
Best Director	Europa	Europa	Haider Rashid	Iraq, Italy, Kuwait
Jury Prize	Hit the Road	جاده خاکی	Panah Panahi	Iran
Best Actor	Europa	Europa	Adam Ali (performance); dir. Haider Rashid	Iraq, Italy, Kuwait
Best Actress	Yuni	Yuni	Arawinda Kirana (performance); dir. Kamila Andini	Indonesia, Singapore, France, Australia
Best Saudi Film	Rupture	تمزُّق	Hamzah K. Jamjoom	Saudi Arabia
Audience Award	You Resemble Me	You Resemble Me	Dina Amer	Egypt, France, United States
Immersive Silver Yusr	Samsara	Samsara	Hsin-Chien Huang	Taiwan
Immersive Gold Yusr	End of Night	End of Night	David Adler	Denmark, France
Short Competition Golden Yusr	Tala’Vision	Tala’Vision	Murad Abu Eisheh	Jordan, Germany
Special Mention	Farha	فرحة	Darin J Sallam	Jordan
Best Cinematic Contribution	Hit the Road	جاده خاکی	(Cinematography by Amin Jafari)	Iran
Best Screenplay	Neighbours	Neighbours	Mano Khalil	Syria, Switzerland
