= List of Kazakhstani European Film Award winners and nominees =

This is a list of Kazakhstani European Film Award winners and nominees. This list details the performances of Kazakhstani actors, actresses, and films that have either been submitted or nominated for, or have won, a European Film Award.

== Main categories ==
Year	Award	Recipient	Status	Note
2008	People's Choice Award for Best European Film	Mongol: The Rise of Genghis Khan	Nominated	Russian-Mongol-Kazakhstani co-production
2008	European Discovery	Tulpan	Nominated	Kazakhstani-German-Italian-Polish-Russian-Mongol-Swiss co-production
2009	European Discovery	The Other Bank	Nominated	Georgian-Kazakhstani co-production

== See also ==
- List of Kazakhstani submissions for the Academy Award for Best International Feature Film
