= Gogita's New Life =

- Directed by: Levan Koguashvili
- Written by: Levan Koguashvili
- Cinematography: Gigi Samsonadze
- Distributed by: Deckert Distribution
- Release date: 2016 (IDFA)
- Running time: 95 minutes
- Country: Georgia
- Language: Georgian

Gogita's New Life (Georgian: Gogitas akhali ckhovreba) is a 2016 Georgian documentary film directed by Levan Koguashvili. It was screened in the Feature-Length Documentary section at the International Documentary Film Festival Amsterdam.

== Synopsis ==
The film is about a middle-aged man, Gogita, who returns to a normal life after 14 years in prison. He meets a girl on the internet, Maka, who has a job baking cakes and lives with her mother on their farm. Gogita soon find outs that Maka is the prettiest woman in the world.

== Production ==
Levan Koguashvili started to develop the idea for the film in early 2012. He was interested in the conditions of prisons in Georgian jails, but it was difficult to make a film in the prison. "The only way to get permission to film inside was through the churches in the jails, and Gogita was one of the guys coming to the church in the jail." Levan did a pause and made his second fiction feature - Blind Dates. After its success he continued working on this documentary. "I became part of their relationship", said the director about his closeness to the film's protagonists - Gogita and Maka.
