= Ia Ninidze =

Georgian actor

- Born: Iya Ninidze; 8 September 1960 (age 65); Tbilisi
- Education: Tbilisi Choreographical School, Gerasimov Institute of Cinematography
- Occupation: actor
- Children: two

Iya Ninidze known as la Ninidze (Georgian: ია ნინიძე; born 8 September 1960) is a Georgian actor who starred in a musical when she was thirteen. She has been called "the Georgian Audrey Hepburn" and starred in films and TV. One of the films was delayed for three years while the Soviet censors considered the way it satirised Joseph Stalin.

== Life ==
Ninidze was born in 1960 in, what is now the capital of Georgia, Tbilisi. Her father was a television director and her mother taught Russian. Ninidze was sent to learn ballet early at Tbilisi Choreographical School where she was spotted as a potential actor. At the age of thirteen she was in Giorgi Shengelaya's iconic Georgian musical Melodies of Vera Quarter where she played, Tsitsino, a girl who wanted to go to ballet school.

She has been called "the Georgian Audrey Hepburn". Her films include the 1968 film, Do Not Worry, and the 1975 film, The First Swallow. This is a film about a Georgian football team who take on national and international football teams. In the 1987 film Repentance, she plays the wife of the leading character. The film was made in 1984 but it took three years of consideration before the Soviet censors agreed to the film being distributed. The film is a satire about the life and crimes of Stalin.

On television she has appeared in Simple Truths and the two part comedy drama Heavenly Swallows. In that popular Russian TV film she stars as a schoolgirl, and would be actress, who is escorted by her singing teacher to an arranged marriage. She moved to Moscow to appear in the theatre.

In 2012 she had a part in the Georgian film Keep Smiling which was a small budget film by Rusudan Chkonia that was put forward as Georgia's entry for the best foreign language film at that year's Oscars. The comedy follows the story as ambitious mothers compete, by proxy, as they enter their daughters into an unscrupulous beauty contest.

== Private life ==
She has two children.
