= Shorena Begashvili =

Georgian actress

Shorena Begashvili (Georgian: შორენა ბეგაშვილი, born July 8, 1982) is a Georgian actress and television host. She graduated from Shota Rustaveli Theatrical Institute in Tbilisi, Georgia and worked in some theatres. After that, she began appearing in movies. She also had her own show Night with Shorena on Imedi TV.

She is divorced and has one child.

She has more than 1.4 million followers on Instagram.

== Filmography ==
- Everything Will Be Alright (2009)
- Dream Town (2010)
- Give Me a Pump (2010)
- I'll Die Without You (2010)
- My Dad's Girlfriend (2011)
- Poker am (2012)
- Keep Smiling (2012 film)
