= Errors of Youth =

1978 Soviet drama film

- Film poster
- Directed by: Boris Frumin
- Written by: Boris Frumin; Eduard Topol
- Starring: Stanislav Zhdanko; Nikolai Karachentsov; Marina Neyolova; Nikolai Penkov; Natalya Varley; Mikhail Vaskov
- Cinematography: Aleksei Gambaryan
- Edited by: Tamara Denisova
- Music by: Viktor Lebedev
- Production company: Lenfilm
- Release date: 1978
- Running time: 87 minutes
- Country: Soviet Union
- Language: Russian

Errors of Youth (Russian: Ошибки юности, Oshibki yunosti) is a Soviet drama film directed in 1978 by Boris Frumin. It was screened in the Un Certain Regard section at the 1989 Cannes Film Festival. The "critical realism" is reported to have delayed the release; Frumin left the Soviet Union in 1979 and was in 1988 invited back to complete it.

== Plot ==
The film recounts the restless life of Dmitri Guryanov after he completes his military service.

== Cast ==
- Nina Arkhipova as mother
- Nikolai Karachentsov as Gena
- Marina Neyolova as Polina
- Nikolai Penkov as Konstantin
- Natalya Varley as Zina
- Mikhail Vaskov as Burkov
- Stanislav Zhdanko as Dimitri Gurianov
- Yuriy Dubrovin as director of sovkhoz
- Yuri Chernov as Pankin
- Afanasy Kochetkov as father
- Antonina Vvedenskaya as Lyusya
