= Brighton 4th =

2021 film

- Directed by: Levan Koguashvili
- Starring: Levan Tediashvili
- Release date: 10 June 2021 (Tribeca)
- Running time: 96 minutes
- Countries: Georgia, Russia
- Languages: Georgian, Russian, English
- Box office: $22,313

Brighton 4th (Georgian: მეოთხე ბრაიტონი meotkhe Brait’oni) is a 2021 Georgian drama film directed by Levan Koguashvili. It was selected as the Georgian entry for the Best International Feature Film at the 94th Academy Awards.

== Plot ==
A former Olympic wrestler from Tbilisi helps his adult son in Brighton Beach to get his life on track.

== Cast ==
- Levan Tediashvili
- Giorgi Tabidze
- Kakhi Kavsadze
- Nadezhda Mikhalkova
- Irakli Kavsadze
- Tornike Bziava
- Anastasia Romashko

== Reception ==
=== Critical response ===
On Rotten Tomatoes, the film holds an approval rating of 89% based on 27 reviews, with an average rating of 7.5/10.

== Awards ==
The film won best picture award at Asian World Film Festival 2021 in Los Angeles. At the Tribeca Film Festival 2021, it won three awards: best international film, best actor for Levan Tediashvili, and best screenplay for Boris Frumin. At FilmFestival Cottbus 2021, the film also won three awards: Outstanding Individual Performance, for Levan Tediashvili; also the FIPRESCI Prize, and the Prize of the Ecumenical Jury.

== See also ==
- List of submissions to the 94th Academy Awards for Best International Feature Film
- List of Georgian submissions for the Academy Award for Best International Feature Film
