= Feola =

Feola is a surname of Italian origin, a derivative of the personal name Feo, which is in turn derived from Maffeo, an Italian equivalent of Matthew. Notable people with the surname include:

- Andrea Feola (born 1992), Italian footballer
- Rosa Feola (born 1986), Italian operatic soprano
- Vicente Feola (1909–1975), Brazilian football manager and coach

== See also ==
- United States v. Feola, a United States Supreme Court case
