= Heavenly Swallows =

- Written by: Leonid Kvinikhidze
- Directed by: Leonid Kvinikhidze
- Starring: Ia Ninidze; Andrei Mironov; Irina Gubanova; Lyudmila Gurchenko
- Music by: Viktor Lebedev
- Country of origin: Soviet Union
- Original language: Russian

Production
- Cinematography: Nikolai Zhilin
- Running time: 126 minutes
- Production company: Lenfilm

Original release
- Release: 1976

Heavenly Swallows (Russian: Небесные ласточки, romanized: Nebesnye lastochki) is a 1976 Soviet two-part musical comedy-drama television film directed by Leonid Kvinikhidze, based on the vaudeville-opérette Mam'zelle Nitouche.

== Plot ==
=== First part. "Boarding house" ===
In a small town there is a variety theater and a military regiment is quartered. Nearby is a monastery with the boarding house "Celestial Swallows", where under the strict eye of nuns girls from noble families learn good manners and etiquette.

Denise de Florigny is one of the best pupils of the monastery, in the opinion of teachers and the abbess, a diligent and modest girl. But in reality she is a mischievous and trouble-making woman, dreaming not about marriage and "fulfilling a family debt," but about a stage career.

Modestly dressed and devout Monsieur Celestin teaches singing in the boarding school. None of the nuns know that he, under the pseudonym of Floridor, composes music for theatrical performances with frivolous and by no means theological plots. Only a few senior pupils, including Denise, are exposed to the mystery of Celestin-Floridor.

One day Denise learns about the decision of her parents to take her away from the boarding house and arrange her to be married to a young officer whom she does not know. Monsieur Celeste is entrusted with taking the girl to the city and to send her by train to Paris.

=== Second part. "Variety" ===
After leaving Denise in the hotel, the maestro is going to decide his theatrical affairs - in the evening is scheduled the premiere of the play which features his music. Frustrated by unexpected changes in her own life that do not coincide with her dreams, the girl is not willing to sit in her hotel room and decides to visit the theater alone - she knows all the roles, all the musical parties in today's performance.

Meanwhile, a grandiose scandal is springing up in the theater - the starring role of Korina, who previously received Celestin's wooing favorably and dismissed the straightforward officer-like courtship of Major Alfred Château-Gibus, after hearing from one of her gossipy girlfriends during an intermission, that the maestro was seen in a hotel with a young girl, she is furious, demonstratively quarrels with the director and leaves with the major, saying that she will not act "in this mediocre play". The play is on the verge of a breakdown, but the situation is saved by Denise who appears in the theater (who introduces herself as "Mademoiselle Nitouche"), whom the lieutenant Fernand Shampleret accidentally meets, and takes her behind the scenes. The director, not seeing another way out, releases her on stage in the second act, the girl saves the production, moreover, the public takes it with great enthusiasm.

Not having sat down as a result of all the events of the previous evening on the train to Paris, Celeste and Denise return to the guesthouse. Lieutenant Shamplatra also appears there soon. It turns out that the lieutenant, who also had to go to Paris to marry on his parents' urging the unknown Denise de Florigny, a pupil of the Pansion of the Swallows, at the first glance fell in love with Mademoiselle Nitush, and now wants to announce that he can not marry Denise. Denise asks the abbess to talk with her fiancé in order to "guide him on the right path," and in a private conversation she reveals her identity to him.

== Cast ==
=== Lead roles ===
- Ia Ninidze - Denise de Florigny, she is also Mademoiselle Nituş (she sounded the role and sings - Elena Driatskaya)
- Andrei Mironov - Celestin, who is also Floridor
- Irina Gubanova - Caroline, abbess of the boarding house of noble maidens "Celestial Swallows"
- Lyudmila Gurchenko - Korina "Coco", prima
- Sergei Zakharov - Fernand Shamplatra, lieutenant (Oleg Basilashvili voiced the role)
- Alexander Schirvindt - Alfred Château-Gibus, major, brother of the prioress of Carolina

=== Supporting roles ===
- Era Ziganshina - Ursula
- Gelena Ivliev - Henrietta
- Boris Leskin - Gustav Cristo, the captain
- Eugene Shpitko - Michel Gutier, Captain
- Ilya Rakhlin - director of the theater-variety show (Vladimir Tatosov was the voice)
- Nonna Dzneladze is married to the director of the theater
- Antonina Aksenova - Sylvia, actress variety show, girlfriend "Coco"
- Lyudmila Davydova - Lydia
- The Ballet Ensemble of the Leningrad State Academic Opera and Ballet Theater. S. M. Kirova
- The Ballet Ensemble of the Leningrad State Theater of Musical Comedy
- Leningrad State Music Hall
  - Artistic director - Ilya Rakhlin

== Production ==
Principal photography took place in Crimea – in Yalta and Alupka. Most of the interiors were shot at the Lenfilm pavilions, some episodes were filmed at the Vorontsov Palace.
