= List of Georgian films of the 1970s =

A list of the films produced in the cinema of Georgia in the 1970s, ordered by year of release:

Title	Director	Cast	Genre	Studio/notes
1970
1971
1972
1973
1974
1975
Pastorale	Otar Iosseliani			
1976
Drevo zhelaniya (The Wishing Tree)	Tengiz Abuladze			
1977
Mimino	Georgiy Daneliya			
Love at First Sight				
1978
1979
