= Shota Managadze =

Georgian film director (1901–1977)

- შოთა მანაგაძე
- Shota Managadze
- Born: 19 March 1901; Kutaisi, Kutaisi Governorate, Russian Empire
- Died: 22 June 1977 (aged 76); Tbilisi, Georgian SSR, Soviet Union
- Resting place: Saburtalo Pantheon, Tbilisi
- Occupations: Film director, screenwriter
- Years active: 1938–1976

Shota Ilias dze Managadze (Georgian: შოთა მანაგაძე; 19 March 1901 – 22 June 1977) was a Georgian film director and screenwriter. He worked at the Georgian Film Studio for several decades and was named a People's Artist of the Georgian SSR in 1966.

== Early life and education ==
Managadze was born on 19 March 1901 in Kutaisi. He studied at Tbilisi State University and at a theatre studio in Tbilisi, and in 1938 graduated from the directing faculty of the Gerasimov Institute of Cinematography (VGIK) in Moscow.

== Career ==
After working in the theatre as an actor and director during the 1920s and early 1930s, Managadze joined the Tbilisi film studio (now Gruziya-Film), where he spent the rest of his career as a director and screenwriter.

His films include The Bridge (1942), Troublesome Neighbours (1945), Masters of Georgian Ballet (1955, with Vakhtang Chabukiani), The Lad from Sabudara (1957), Flower on the Snow (1959), Who Will Saddle the Horse? (1963), Khevsur Ballad (1965), and The Honest Eye (1976). He co-directed Expectation (1970) and Tsutisopeli (1971) with his son, the director Nodar Managadze.

== Awards and honours ==
- People's Artist of the Georgian SSR (1966)
- Komsomol Prize of Georgia (1974)
- Order of the October Revolution (1976)

== Personal life ==
Managadze's son, Nodar Managadze, was also a film director. Shota Managadze died in Tbilisi on 22 June 1977 and was buried at the Saburtalo Pantheon.
