= Kakhi Kavsadze =

Soviet and Georgian actor (1935–2021)

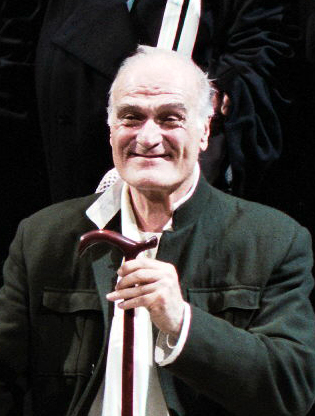
- Kakhi Kavsadze in Ronald Harwood's "Quartet", 2003
- Born: 5 June 1935; Tbilisi, Georgian SSR, Transcaucasian SFSR, Soviet Union
- Died: 27 April 2021 (aged 85); Tbilisi, Georgia
- Occupation: Actor
- Years active: 1955–2021
- Awards: People’s Artist (1981)

Kakhi Kavsadze (Georgian: კახი კავსაძე K’akhi K’avsadze; June 5, 1935 – April 27, 2021) was a Georgian and Soviet film, television and stage actor.

== Early life ==
He was born in Tbilisi. After his birth, his parents moved to Tkibuli. His father David Kavsadze was a choirleader who, while serving in the Red Army during World War II, was taken prisoner, led a choir in the prison camp, and helped to save the lives of many Georgian prisoners, but after the war was charged with treason and exiled to Sverdlovsk Oblast.

Kakhi Kavsadze graduated in 1959 from the Shota Rustaveli Theatre and Film University and the Rustaveli Theatre.

== Career ==
Kavsadze made his debut in cinema in the 1950s. He was awarded the title of People’s Artist (1981) and won the Festival Prize at Dushanbe (1989).

His notable roles include Adam (Divine Comedy), Tavadi Kotsia (Gushindelni), Devdariani (Sabraldebo daskvna), Iliko (Me, Grandma, Iliko and Ilarion), Simon Chachava (The Caucasian Chalk Circle), Lord (Richard III), Kent (King Lear) and Rasputin (Kvachi Kvachantiradze).

He died of complications from COVID-19 in Tbilisi at the age of 85.

== Selected filmography ==
Year	Name	Role
1970	White Sun of the Desert	Abdullah
1971	A Necklace for My Beloved	Zaur
1976	The Saplings	David
1978	Centaurs	Ugo
1982	Melodies of Vera Quarter	Foreigner
1984	Love at First Sight	Selim
1985	White Rose of Immortality	Vodyanoy
1987	Repentance	Mikheil Koresheli
1988	The Crime Has Happened	Andro
1988	The Life of Don Quixote and Sancho	Alonso Quijano
1991	I am the Pele's godfather!	Lado Kavsadze
1992	The Wishing Tree	Rebel Ioram
1994	Iavnana	grandpa
1996	Death of Orpheus	Elizbar, artist
1996	A Chef in Love	Le Président
2013	Blind Dates	Sandro's Father
2021	Brighton 4th	Sergo
