= Inola Gurgulia =

Georgian singer (1929–1977)

Inola Gurgulia (Georgian: ინოლა გურგულია; July 25, 1929 – November 24, 1977) was a Georgian composer, poet, and singer.

== Biography ==
Born on July 25, 1929, Gurgulia grew up in the old districts of Tbilisi. Every summer she would visit Mingrelia in the village of Uchashona. Her aunt taught her to play the guitar, while her nanny taught her how to play on Panduri and chonguri, local folk string instruments.

In 1952, Gurgulia graduated from Tbilisi Ilia Chavchavadze Pedagogical Institute of Foreign Languages. There, together with Giuli Darakhvelidze and Medea Sikharulidze, she founded the women's vocal-keyboard trio "Samaya", which performed songs written by Gurgulia (often on her own lyrics).

In the 1960s, Gurgulia was featured in several films, which also incorporated her songs. She did not issue any official records in her lifetime.

Gurgulia's songs had a distinctive sound and were derived from Georgian folk and partly urban styles.

Gurgulia died in 1977. She is buried in Saburtalo Pantheon in Tbilisi.

== In popular culture ==
In the 2017 film My Happy Family, the leading actress, Ia Shughliashvili, who in real life happens to be Gurgulia's daughter, performs one of her mother's songs on the guitar.
