= List of Georgian films of the 1930s =

A list of the films produced in the cinema of Georgia in the 1930s, ordered by year of release:

Title	Director	Cast	Genre	Studio/notes
1930
Jim Shvante (The salt to Svanetia)	Mikheil Kalatozishvili			
1931
1932
1933
1934
1935
1936
1937
1938
1939
