= Giorgi Kekelidze =

Georgian poet, essayist, and digital librarian

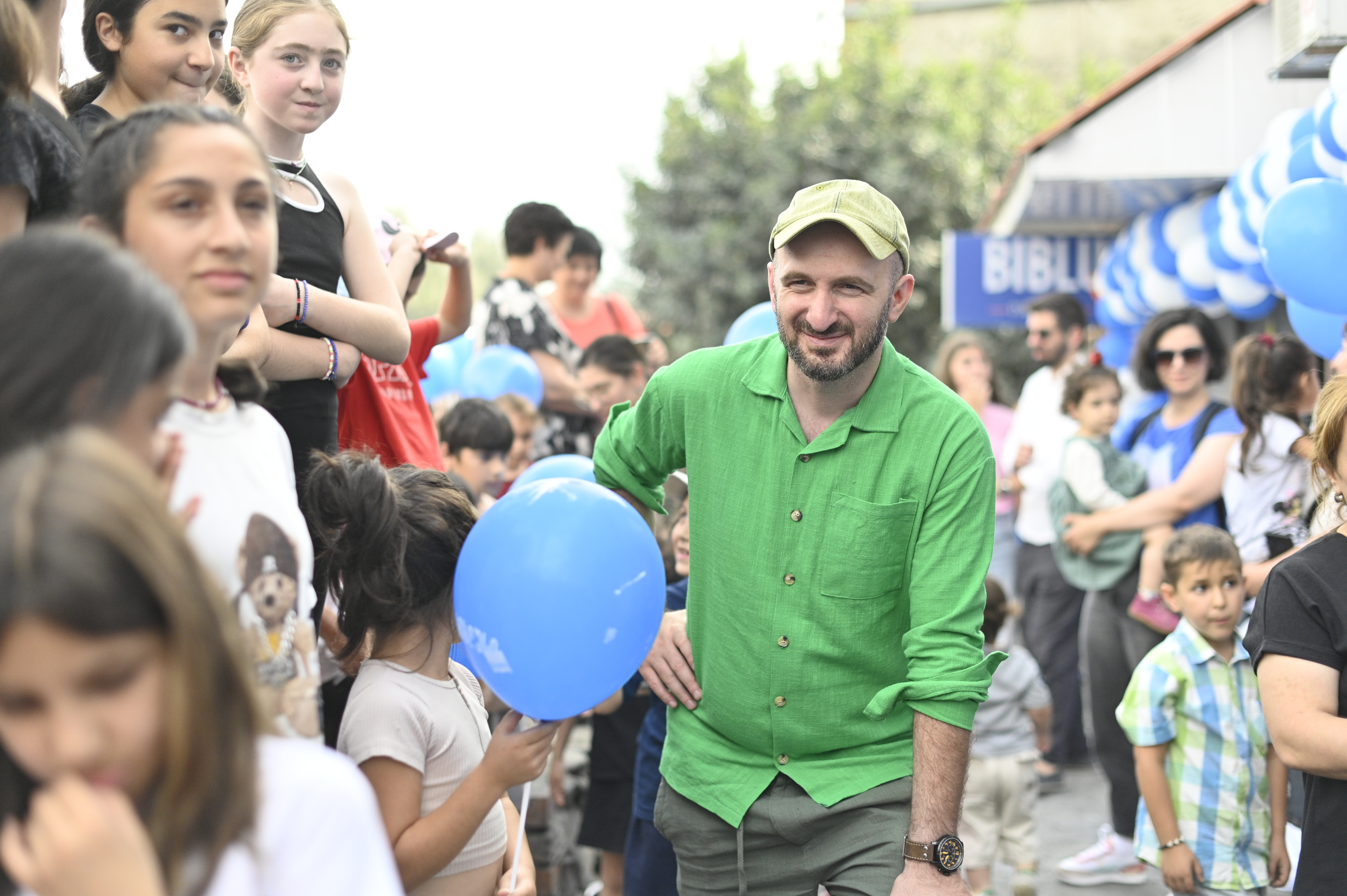
Giorgi Kekelidze, 2024

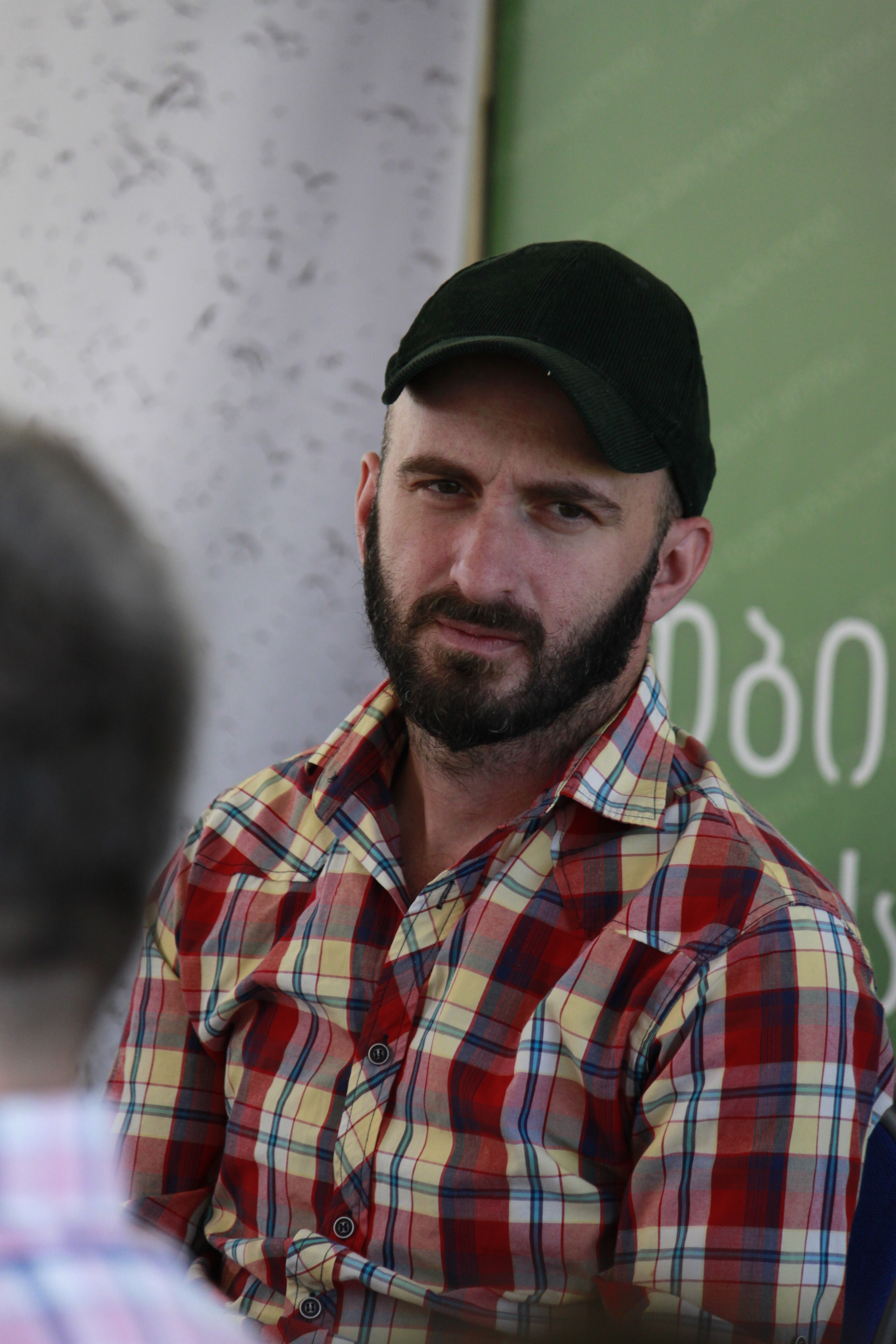
Giorgi Kekelidze, 2020

Giorgi Kekelidze (Georgian: გიორგი კეკელიძე; born April 10, 1984) is a Georgian poet, prose writer, essayist, lecturer and TV presenter. He served as Director General of the National Parliamentary Library in Georgia from 2012 until January 11th 2024. He is the founder of the Book Museum and the Press Museum and the originator and implementor of the concept of public garden libraries in Georgia. He also initiated the esteblishment of Georgian libraries abroad. Mr. Kekeklidze is the Creative Director of Bibles, a Georgian bookstore chain and has served as the founder and chairman of the Literacy Promotion Society since January 2024.

== Life ==
Born in Ozurgeti, Giorgi Kekelidze graduated from the Department of Philology at Tbilisi State University with master's degree in Humanitarian Sciences. From 2006 to 2008 he worked at the penal Institution of Rustavi as a teacher of the Georgian language and literature. Since 2009, he has presented various literary-critical programs at different radio stations.

From 2010 he is a literary columnist for the magazine Tabula. He delivers lectures on Classical literature at the Free University of Tbilisi. Since 2012 he hosts a literary show "Interpretation" on the Akhali Arkhi television channel. In 2012 he founded a charitable organisations "Lib-Equilibrium" and "Lib-Club". In the same year, he became an author and a host of the show program "Litarea".

In 2012, he was appointed as a director of National Parliamentary Library of Georgia. He began reforms in several directions - digitalization, service, TV programs, also opened various thematic corners, including foreign libraries etc. Georgian libraries opened in Istanbul, Kiev, Vienna and other countries' libraries. He created a library of e-learning library syndicate, which united regional libraries. As a result of his activities in 2012, the National Library was awarded with the name of Tolerance of the Year.

In 2013, Kekelidze met in a director of the Library of Congress, James Billington in Washington DC. As a result of their agreement, Georgian digital archives were opened for the archival of the world and the US archives for Georgia. At the same visit, the National Library was handed over to Boston archive of Zaldastanishvili and the New York Archives of Grigol Diasamidze. Giorgi Kekelidze's poetry evening was held in the Library of Congress also in 2012.

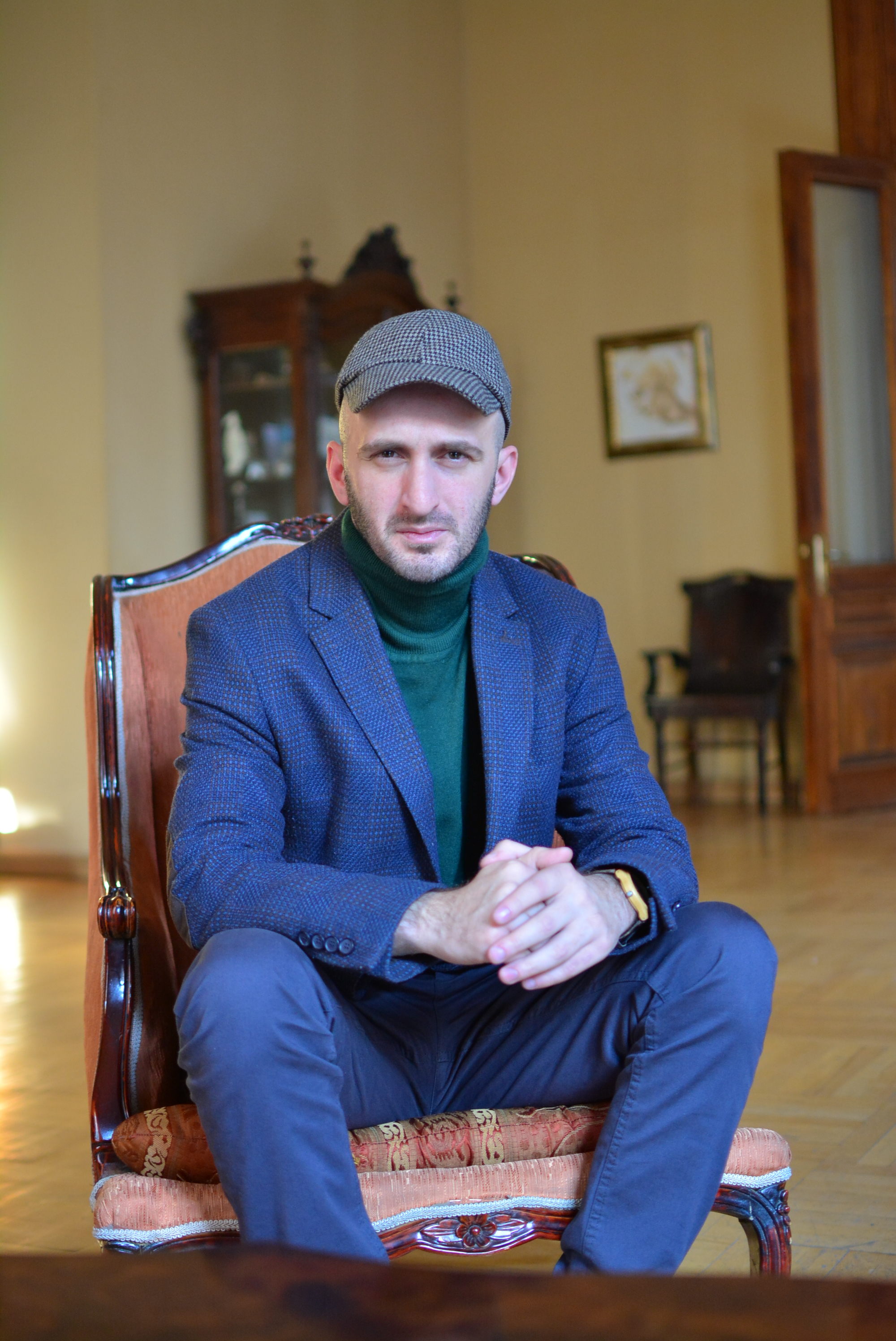
Giorgi Kekelidze at the National Library

Since 2013 he is a TV host of the Maestro morning program and video-blog. With his initiative, the National Library opened a children's room, emigration hall, national digital photo gallery, public library for literacy and literacy. In the same year, the National Library was given a building in Kutaisi, where it was decided to create a home for foreign scholars.

In 2014 he published a publication in the Liberal magazine of Libraries. In 2014, with his initiative, the library and the first Mobile Company in Georgia, Geocell begin to seek and digest family-family photos throughout Georgia. In 2015 the National Library joined the number of developed libraries in the world and raised the American integrated library program Sierra.

In 2015, he became a presenter on TV "Dila Books" - Rustavi 2.

In 2017, with the initiative of Kekelidze, the biggest Book Museum in Georgia was founded. The museum renovation and equipment according to the contemporary standards is supported by the Georgian Industrial Group and David Bezhuashvili Foundation.

Since 2017, Kekelidze has been a full professor in the Georgian Language and Literature. He teaches at the European University Tbilisi and for the Sunday classes at the European School Tbilisi.

== Creative life ==
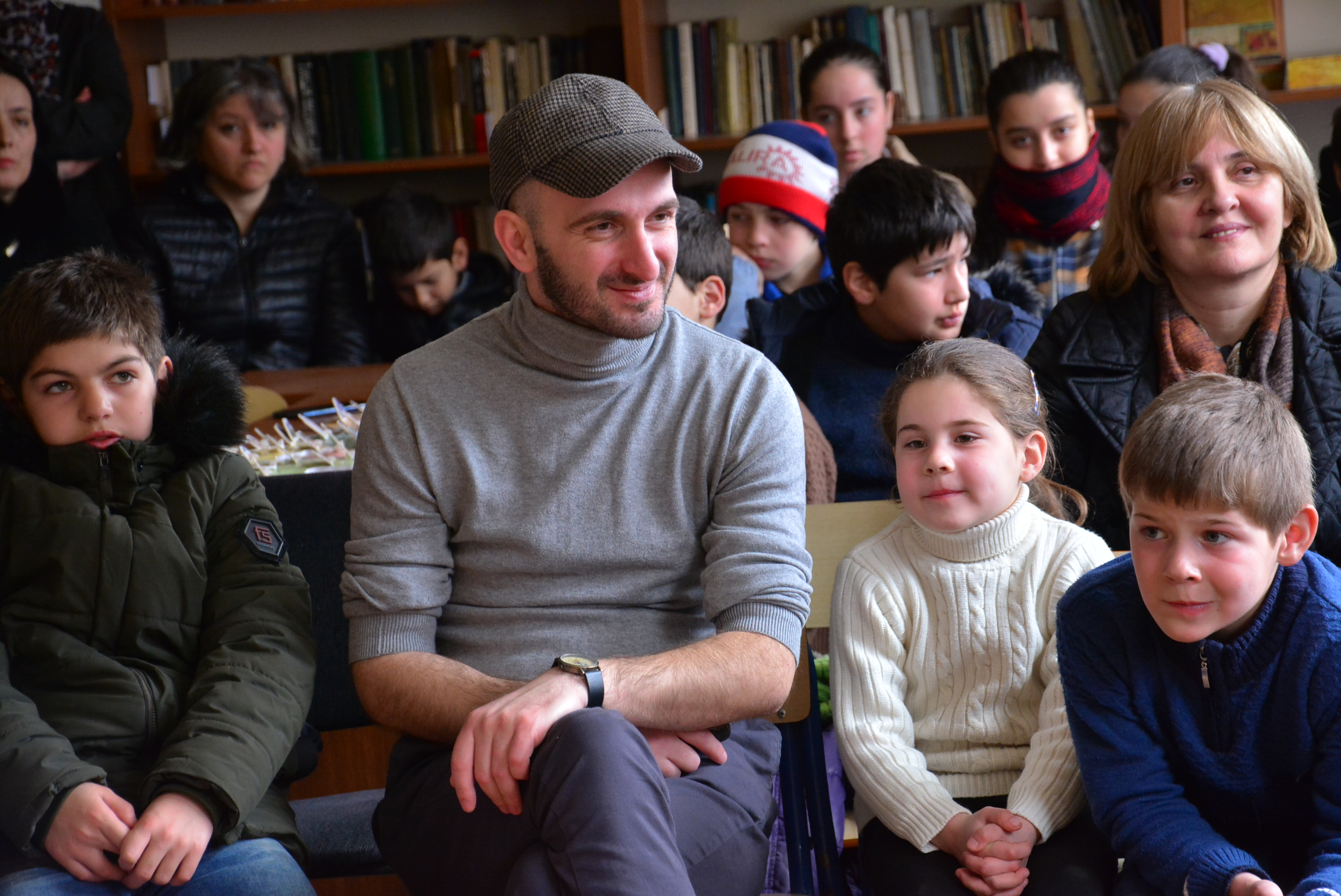
#ekvilibrium

In 2008, Giorgi Kekelidze published his first collection of poems called “Odebi”. In addition to poems, there are marginal notes by several famous critics about the collection and it is decorated (designed) by David Meskhi's photos. In 2010 some of his poems for children were published by the same publishing company in the collection of children poetry.

In 2011, the publishing house “Siesta” published Kekelidze's poem “Korani” (as a part of a series called “Book on a Plate» (Tsigni Tefshze). Instead of standard publishing, books are being brought to the supermarkets, where the papers are placed and “packaged” on plastic plates, which normally are used for packaging frozen chickens, fish, vegetables, fruits or cakes. The idea of these series comes from American writer William S. Burroughs's novel “naked lunch). The idea of the title belongs to Jack Kerouac.

In 2010, Kekelidze’s poems were exhibited in art-installation made by Text/Gallery, in London.

In 2012, Vazha-Pshavela’s “Snake Eater” was published by Giorgi Kekelidze and Gigi Khornauli as an adapted comic-book version.

At the end of the 2012, Kekelidze and Mai Lashauri's combined album called “Miniatures” was published. In 2013t a movie called “Ambiente” based on Kekelidze's works was released. In 2013, a Georgian singer Ketato Charkviani recorded an experimental duet, which was also based on his poem.

In 2013, at the Frankfurt International Book Fair, there was a presentation of translation of Kekelidze's trilingual (English, German, Russian) miniatures. A video-installation by Maia Machaladze and Mai Lashauri was also presented on the same festival.

In 2014, a collection of his poems called “Poetry 2008-2013” was published. (Preface by Zurab Kiknadze). In the same year, he started creating a prosaic work called “Gurian Diaries». At the same time, he was making video-sujet called “The Stories of the Repressed Gurians, a region in Georgia. “Gurian Wedding Stories” which is based on narrations of Gurulebi became a bestseller from the moment of publishing.

Kekelidze translated several works of Austrian poets, world literature tales collection called “magical door”, Sergei Dorenko's “Roman 2008”. His poems are translated in English, Russian and Azeri languages. He is listed in the Azeri anthology of Georgian poets.

== Awards and acknowledgements ==
- 2009-Georgian Literature Prize “Saba”-The best debut of the year for collected stories named “Odebi”
- 2010- Award from Ministry of Sport and Youth Affairs of Georgia- The most successful young man in literature field.
- 2010- Man of the year by the magazine “Hot Chocolate”.
- 2012- Man of the year by the magazine “Hot Chocolate”.
- 2013- 50 most successful graduates of Tbilisi state university.
- 2013- Wins a literature award named after Mushvig.
- 2014- Giorgi Kekelidze “Gurian Diaries” is acknowledged as the national bestseller of the year.
- 2015- Laureate of the Tsinandali award for the collected poems “Poetry 2008-2013”
- 2015- Author of the year in Georgian literature by the statistic of magazine EGO.
- 2015- won the Guram Rcheulishvili's award for the “Gurian Diaries”.
- 2015- Names 2015 for “Gurian Diaries” and for digital photo history (project of the year).
- 2016- Georgian public broadcaster's award for the year's educational project “Ekvilibriumi”, which aims to renew libraries in different Georgian villages.
- 2016- The man of the 2016 year (organization “Amagdari”).
- 2016- an honorary freeman of Ozurgeti, hometown.
- 2016- Georgian public broadcaster's yearly award for the educational project electronic library.
- 2016- “Gurian Diaries” book 2, the bestseller of the year in Georgia.
