= Namme =

- Film poster
- Directed by: Zaza Khalvashi
- Written by: Zaza Khalvashi
- Starring: Mariska Diasamidze
- Cinematography: Giorgi Shvelidze
- Release date: 25 October 2017 (Tokyo)
- Running time: 91 minutes
- Countries: Georgia; Lithuania
- Language: Georgian

Namme (Georgian: ნამე; Namme) is a 2017 Georgian art fantasy drama film directed by Zaza Khalvashi. It had an international premiere in the Tokyo International Film Festival. The film's cast includes theatre actors from Khulo, and director Khalvashi's screenplay is based on national legends and stories. Namme is an international co-production between Georgia and Lithuania. It was selected as the Georgian entry for the Best Foreign Language Film at the 91st Academy Awards, but it was not nominated.

== Plot ==
Plot of Namme is not based on the traditional structure of narration, Zaza Khalvashi shows us mystic experience of slow cinema. There are no protagonists or antagonists, as the director said he wanted to express the atmosphere of the surrounding where he lives.

Namme is the daughter of the village’s healer, Ali, With three mature brothers whose ideologies are completely different. Namme and her father live entirely alone from the other members of the family. One brother of Namme is muslim, the second brother is atheist and a teacher, the third is a Christian Orthodox priest who’s singlehandedly building a church. Unlike the brothers, Ali and Namme perform pagan rituals and heal people with sacralized water, by the mystic fish that was inherited to the family by their ancestors. Namme is obliged to follow her father's path because her brothers decided not to.”

During this silent-rhythmic environment, the director tactically leaves this magical space and shows us urban surroundings and life. Because of the technical development, the water gets polluted and the fish becomes sick. As we continue, we see that Namme isn't allowed to be in love affairs, due to the water's power becoming useless if so. Unfortunately, she does fall in love with a man she cures, as he shows her his favorite spot, a lake surrounded by mountains, which will be important in the end. As said, her power fades away. Namme slowly becomes unable to cure people. She faces the dilemma: her private life and destiny, or the sacralized traditions of her family, curing innocent people.

In the end, she emancipates from the background and lets the fish go. In one of the last scenes, she walks on the water of a lake and then fades away with the fog, after releasing the fish. Some viewers assume that she became one with the universe, or that she continued her private and non-mystic life, that's on the decision of the audience.

== Cast ==
- Mariska Diasamidze as (Namme)
- Aleko Abashidze
- Ednar Bolkvadze as (Giorgi) the priest
- Roman Bolkvadze as (Nuri) the mullah
- Roin Surmanidze as (Lado) the teacher

== Production ==
"Namme" a winner of the National Film Center and is work of Georgian-Lithuanian companies. Zaza Khalvashi started to work on scenery many years before the film's premiere. "I wrote the script in 2010, since I was in search of financing, and that's my turn on the screen. In 2016, I got the funding of the National Film Center and I worked, "recalls Director in interview.

He selected mainly non-professional and debutant actors for the film. Zaza chose for leading role Mariska Diasamidze, which is also young filmmaker and has studied animation in Shota Rustaveli Theatre and Film University.

== See also ==
- List of submissions to the 91st Academy Awards for Best Foreign Language Film
- List of Georgian submissions for the Academy Award for Best Foreign Language Film
