= Nodar Managadze =

Georgian film director (1943–2006)

- ნოდარ მანაგაძე
- Nodar Managadze
- Born: 19 March 1943; Tbilisi, Georgian SSR, Soviet Union
- Died: 27 November 2006 (aged 63); Tbilisi, Georgia
- Occupations: Film director, screenwriter, producer
- Years active: 1965–2001

Nodar Shotas dze Managadze (Georgian: ნოდარ მანაგაძე; 19 March 1943 – 27 November 2006) was a Georgian film director, screenwriter and producer. He directed the 2001 film The Migration of the Angel, which was Georgia's submission for the Academy Award for Best Foreign Language Film, and was named an Honoured Art Worker of the Georgian SSR in 1980.

== Early life and education ==
Managadze was born on 19 March 1943 in Tbilisi, the son of the film director Shota Managadze. In 1965 he graduated from the directing faculty of the Shota Rustaveli Theatre Institute in Tbilisi, where he studied in the workshop of Dimitri Aleksidze and Mikheil Tumanishvili.

== Career ==
From the mid-1960s Managadze worked as a director at the Georgian Film Studio. His first features, The Waiting (1969) and Tsutisopeli (1971), were co-directed with his father Shota Managadze; the latter won prizes at festivals in Tbilisi and Sorrento. He went on to direct films independently, among them The Story of Ivane Kotorashvili (1974, after Vazha-Pshavela), Ascension (1977), Hey, Maestro! (1987) and The Migration of the Angel (2001). He was the co-author of the screenplays of his own films and also worked as a producer. From 1988 he taught at Tbilisi State University and later at the Shota Rustaveli Theatre and Film University.

== Awards and honours ==
- Komsomol Prize of Georgia (1974)
- Honoured Art Worker of the Georgian SSR (1980)

== Death ==
Managadze died in Tbilisi on 27 November 2006.
