= Afef Ben Mahmoud =

Tunisian actress and director

- Occupations: Actress, director

Afef Ben Mahmoud is a Tunisian actress and director. She has acted in films like Round 13 and Streams.

== Early life ==
Mahmoud began acting as a child. In school, he participated in a theater group.

== Career ==
Prior to film, Mahmoud's career spanned dance and theater.

At the 2023 Cairo International Film Festival, she won the Best Actress Award for her performance in Mohamed Ali Nahdi's Round 13.

In the same year, she co-directed the film Backstage with Khalil Benkirane, which was selected for the Venice Film Festival, the Red Sea International Film Festival, and others.
