= Khibula =

2017 Georgian film

- Film poster
- Directed by: Giorgi Ovashvili
- Written by: Giorgi Ovashvili, Roelof Jan Minneboo
- Produced by: George Ovashvili, Guillaume de Seille, Eike Goreczka, Christoph Kukula
- Starring: Hossein Mahjoub, Lika Babluani
- Cinematography: Enrico Lucidi
- Edited by: Sun-min Kim
- Music by: Josef Bardanashvili
- Distributed by: 42film, Alamdary Films, Arizona Films
- Release date: 2 July 2017 (Karlovy Vary International Film Festival)
- Running time: 97 minutes
- Countries: Georgia, Germany, France
- Languages: Georgian, Russian

Khibula (Georgian: ხიბულა, romanized: khibula) is a 2017 Georgian drama film directed by Giorgi Ovashvili about the first democratically elected President of Georgia - Zviad Gamsakhurdia. The film script has written by Giorgi Ovashvili and Roelof Jan Minneboo. Khibula is co-production of director's company Alamdary Films, Germany's 42 Film, France's Arizona Productions and Kino from Kazakhstan.

== Cast ==
- Lika Babluani as Tatia
- Hossein Mahjoub as Zviad Gamsakhurdia
- Lidia Chilashvili as Nia
- Manuchar Shervashidze as Joto
- Nodar Dzidziguri as Zurab
- Galoba Gambaria as Rati
- Qishvard Manvelishvili as Prime minister
- Zurab Antelava as Shalva
