= Andrea Feola =

Italian footballer (born 1992)

Personal information
- Date of birth: 26 June 1992 (age 34)
- Place of birth: Carbonia, Italy
- Height: 1.80 m (5 ft 11 in)
- Position: Midfielder

Team information
- Current team: Fidelis Andria
- Number: 21

Senior career*
Years	Team	Apps	(Gls)
2011–2012	Carloforte		
2012–2013	Selargius	24	(1)
2013–2016	Trapani	30	(0)
2015–2016	→ Arezzo (loan)	31	(1)
2016–2018	Olbia	52	(2)
2018–2019	Bari	20	(1)
2019–2021	Casarano	34	(3)
2021–2022	Casertana	33	(1)
2022–2023	Barletta	21	(0)
2023–	Fidelis Andria	0	(0)
- * Club domestic league appearances and goals as of 7 May 2023

Andrea Feola (born 26 June 1992) is an Italian football player. He plays for Fidelis Andria.

== Club career ==
He made his Serie B debut for Trapani on 8 September 2013 in a game against Empoli.

On 29 August 2019, he signed with Casarano.

On 10 September 2021, he joined Casertana in Serie D.
