= Within Sand =

- Directed by: Mohammed Al-Atawi
- Produced by: Reem Alatawi, Jana Dahlawi
- Starring: Raed Alshammari
- Production company: Alsarid Films
- Release date: 15 February 2024
- Country: Saudi Arabia
- Language: Arabic

Within Sand (فلم بين الرمال) is a Saudi Arabian film directed by Mohammed Al-Atawi. It features an all-Saudi cast led by Raed Alshammari and tells a tale of survival and self-discovery. The film is the first Saudi Arabian film to be shot in Neom.

== Synopsis ==
The film follows Snam, a 23-year-old tobacco merchant, on his journey across the desert after being ambushed and left for dead. Snam's quest to reunite with his pregnant wife turns into a harrowing fight for survival as he travels with a wolf trailing him.

== Production ==
Director Mohammed Al-Atawi aimed to capture a genuine relationship between a man and a wolf, showcasing the mysterious beauty of the north Saudi desert. The film's title, Within Sand, reflects the significance of the desert environment where the story unfolds. The production team included over 60% Saudis, with contributions from more than 20 nationalities and local support from Tabuk.

== Release ==
Within Sand was released in cinemas across Saudi Arabia on February 15, 2024. It received logistical support from NEOM Media Industries and marks Alsarid Films' debut release.
