= Giorgi Maskharashvili =

Georgian actor

- Born: 2 January 1977 (age 49); Tbilisi, Georgia
- Occupations: Actor, film director, Artist
- Years active: 2002–present

Giorgi Maskharashvili (Georgian: გიორგი მასხარაშვილი; born on 18 October 1977 in Tbilisi, Georgia) is a Georgian film, television actor, film director and artist.

== Filmography ==
As actor

- Paradox (TV Series) (2015) - Giorgi
- The Truth (2015) - Sean Foreman
- Tbilisi, I Love You (2014)
- Brides (2014) - Goga
- The Watchmaker (2011)
- Guli + (2011)
- Tbilisi-Tbilisi (2005) - Dato

As director

- The Watchmaker (2011)
- Tbilisuri Love Story (2009)
- Broadway-45 (2007)
- Post punk (2002)
