= Tbilisi-Tbilisi =

2005 film

- Directed by: Levan Zakareishvili
- Written by: Levan Zakareishvili
- Starring: Giorgi Maskharashvili
- Release date: 14 July 2005
- Running time: 87 minutes
- Country: Georgia
- Language: Georgian

Tbilisi-Tbilisi (Georgian: თბილისი-თბილისი) is a 2005 Georgian drama film directed by Levan Zakareishvili. It was selected as the Georgian entry for the Best Foreign Language Film at the 78th Academy Awards, but it was not nominated.

== Cast ==
- Giorgi Maskharashvili
- Eka Nijaradze
- Rusiko Kobiashvili
- Kakha Kintsurashvili

== See also ==
- List of submissions to the 78th Academy Awards for Best Foreign Language Film
- List of Georgian submissions for the Academy Award for Best International Feature Film
