= The Village (2015 film) =

- Film poster
- Directed by: Levan Tutberidze
- Written by: Levan Tutberidze, Aka Morchiladze
- Starring: Crystal Bennett
- Cinematography: George Shvelidze
- Music by: The Shin, Zaza Miminoshvili
- Release date: May 15, 2015 (Seattle)
- Running time: 112 minutes
- Country: Georgia
- Language: Georgian

The Village (Tskhra Mtas Ikit) is a 2015 Georgian drama film, directed by Levan Tutberidze and starring Crystal Bennett and Tornike Bziava. The film premiered on 15 May 2015 at Seattle International Film Festival.

== Cast ==
- Crystal Bennett
- Tornike Bziava
- Mikheil Gomiashvili
- Nugzar Kurashvili
- Eka Molodinashvili
- Tornike Gogrichiani
