= The Russian Triangle =

2007 film directed by Aleko Tsabadze

The Russian Triangle რუსული სამკუთხედი
- Directed by: Aleko Tsabadze
- Written by: Aleko Tsabadze
- Starring: Konstantin Khabensky; Artyom Tkachenko; Pyotr Mironov; Mikhaïl Jonine
- Cinematography: Archil Akhvlediani; Giorgi Beridze
- Edited by: Tania Khodakivska
- Music by: Vakhtang Kakhidze
- Release date: 17 May 2007 (Cannes)
- Running time: 121 minutes
- Country: Georgia
- Language: Russian

The Russian Triangle (Georgian: რუსული სამკუთხედი Rusuli samkudhedi; Russian: Русский треугольник) is a 2007 Russian-language Georgian thriller film directed by Aleko Tsabadze. It was Georgia's submission to the 80th Academy Awards for the Academy Award for Best Foreign Language Film, but was not accepted as a nominee. It was also entered into the 29th Moscow International Film Festival where it won the Special Jury Prize.

== Plot ==
Contemporary Russia. The main characters of the film are victims of the recent war who are lost in a city inhabited by millions. In this megalopolis a series of murders occurs. The investigation gradually leads law student Kolya Vorontsov to the track of the sniper-killer. This is Viktor Alyoshin, a former teacher of Russian language and literature in the Chechen school. Having lost his pregnant Chechen wife during the bombing of Grozny, he adopts Islam and goes to the Chechen fighters ... Vorontsov feels that Aleshin's fate is somehow connected with the Maltsev brothers - Denis and Lev, miraculously surviving after the brutal torture and Chechen captivity. What do these people have in common? And why does the tragedy of 10 years ago completely change the life of Kolya Vorontsov who spent all these years in a city far from military operations? This war demands more and more victims.

== Cast ==
- Artyom Tkachenko as Kolya Vorontsov
- Konstantin Khabenskiy as Denis Maltsev
- Pyotr Mironov as Sniper
- Mikhaïl Jonine as Lev Maltsev
- Oleg Primogenov as Redhead
- Ostap Stupka as Lieutenant Shakalsky
- Oleg Dolin as Philip
- Anatoli Barchuk as Captain Ovcharov
- Ramil Sabitov as Mussa
- Inna Belikova as Polina

== See also ==
- Cinema of Georgia
- List of Georgian submissions for the Academy Award for Best Foreign Language Film
- List of submissions to the 80th Academy Awards for Best Foreign Language Film
