= Hana Alomair =

Saudi director

- Education: King Saud University; Heriot-Watt University
- Occupation: Director
- Years active: 2008–present

Hana Abdullah Alomair is a Saudi writer and director. She is also the chairperson of the Saudi Cinema Association. She has directed films like Dancing On Fire and series like Whispers, the first Saudi thriller original series on Netflix.

In 2020, Alomair was named to the list of Arab Stars of Tomorrow. In 2021, she was named to the Arab Cinema Center's list of the most influential people in the Arab film industry.

== Early life and education ==
Alomair graduated from King Saud University in 1992 with a bachelor's degree in Arabic-English translation. In 1996, she graduated from Heriot-Watt University with a master's degree in the same area.

== Career ==
Prior to her career in film, Alomair worked as a journalist writing film reviews. In 2008, she won the Silver Palm Tree Award for writing Hadaf, a script about a Saudi girl dreaming of being a professional footballer.

In 2013, Alomair served on the jury of the 2013 Saudi Film Festival. One year later, in 2014, her sophomore film, The Complaint, competed in Tessa's Festival for Asian and African Films; in 2015, it won the Golden Palm Tree Award for best short film in the Saudi Film Festival.

In 2019, Alomair's short film Swan Song won the Golden Palm Tree Award for best actor in the Saudi Film Festival.

In 2024, it was announced that Alomair, as creative director at MBC Studios, would direct a horror film adaptation of Osamah Almuslim's Traveler's Hell.
