= The Migration of the Angel =

2001 film by Nodar Managadze

The Migration of the Angel (Georgian: Angelozis gadaprena ანგელოზის გადაფრენა) is a 2001 Georgian film directed by Nodar Managadze. It was Georgia's submission to the 74th Academy Awards for the Academy Award for Best Foreign Language Film, but was not accepted as a nominee.

== See also ==
- Cinema of Georgia
- List of Georgian submissions for the Academy Award for Best Foreign Language Film
- List of submissions to the 74th Academy Awards for Best Foreign Language Film
