= My Happy Family =

2017 Georgian film

- Film poster
- Directed by: Nana Ekvtimishvili; Simon Groß
- Written by: Nana Ekvtimishvili
- Starring: Ia Shugliashvili
- Cinematography: Tudor Vladimir Panduru
- Edited by: Stefan Stabenow
- Distributed by: Memento Film
- Release date: 22 January 2017 (Sundance)
- Running time: 120 minutes
- Country: Georgia
- Language: Georgian
- Box office: $428,468

My Happy Family (Georgian ჩემი ბედნიერი ოჯახი) is a 2017 Georgian drama film directed by Nana Ekvtimishvili and Simon Groß. It was screened in the World Cinema Dramatic Competition section of the 2017 Sundance Film Festival and had its world premiere in the Forum section at the 67th Berlin International Film Festival. Ekvtimishvili and Groß were awarded Best Director at the Sofia International Film Festival, where their film was entered in the International Competition section. The movie was added to Netflix in December 2017 internationally and resided there until December 2022.

== Plot ==
Manana (Ia Shughliashvili), a 50-year-old woman, decides to leave her family, husband, children, and parents. The reasons and rationale for her decision are initially and largely unknown to her family, and remain mysterious to them throughout the story. Her perspective, however, is slowly disclosed to the audience. Manana’s decision to challenge the social expectations of women in her community gives My Happy Family a feminist streak.

A schoolteacher with a career and income of her own, Manana rents a small flat on the outskirts of town. At a local market, she runs into a former high school classmate, who invites her to their 35th high school reunion. At the reunion, a devastating secret is revealed: her husband, Soso, had an affair while married to Manana and fathered a boy who is now 13 years old. Weeks later, posing as a meter-reader for the gas company, Manana visits Soso's ex-lover and her son as a way to see them both in person. Manana also discovers her brother Rezo has spoken to her new neighbors about her life, her decisions, and her situation, and while Rezo seems to believe his actions are an attempt to defend her from strange men, she views his actions as an intrusive violation of her privacy, dignity, and personal agency.

Meanwhile, Manana's son, who still lives with Manana's parents and his father, brings his pregnant girlfriend home to announce their marriage. Manana's daughter is heartbroken to learn her new husband is having an affair (which Manana had accidentally discovered but not disclosed). The film ends as Manana asks Soso several important questions, and the audience is left to wonder what his responses might be.

=== Music ===
In the film, the leading actress, Ia Shughliashvili, performs a song by Inola Gurgulia, who in real life happens to be her mother.

== Cast ==
- Ia Shugliashvili as Manana
- Merab Ninidze as Soso
- Berta Khapava as Lamara
- Tsisia Qumsishvili as Nino
- Dimitri Oragvelidze as Rezo
- Giorgi Khurtsilava as Vakho
- Giorgi Tabidze as Lasha
- Goven Cheishvili as Otar
- Lika Babluani as Tatia Chigogidze
- Mariam Bokeria as Kitsi

== Critical reception ==
After the Sundance Film Festival, the film was screened in Berlinale forum to positive reviews. On review aggregator Rotten Tomatoes, the film holds an approval rating of 100% based on 20 reviews, with an average rating of 8.3/10. On Metacritic, the film has a score of 86 out of 100 from 10 critics, indicating "universal acclaim".

Eric Kohn of IndieWire wrote, "My Happy Family was shot by Romanian cinematographer Tudor Vladimir Panduru, and recalls many of the strengths found in recent Romanian cinema, which often peers into the hectic personal dramas of characters who are smothered by social expectations. The story is laced with lovely melodies and traditional songs that play off Manana’s internal desperation; the camera roams freely around her in crowded scenes that show just how much the groupthink alienates her from her own needs." In The Hollywood Reporter, Jordan Mintzer wrote that the film is "a simple, somewhat mundane scenario that, in the hands of a terrific cast and two talented filmmakers, is transformed into a minor Greek comic-tragedy, with one fearless woman trying to stave off loved ones who smother her with guilt and affection." Village Voice critic Bilge Ebiri called My Happy Family "one of the best films of the year."
