= Chantrapas =

2010 film

- French film poster
- Directed by: Otar Iosseliani
- Written by: Otar Iosseliani
- Produced by: Martine Marignac; Maurice Tinchant
- Starring: Dato Tarielachvili
- Cinematography: Lionel Cousin
- Edited by: Emmanuelle Legendre
- Distributed by: Les Films du Losange (France)
- Release dates: 19 May 2010 (Cannes); 22 September 2010 (Franced)
- Running time: 122 minutes
- Country: Georgia
- Languages: Georgian; French; Russian

Chantrapas (Georgian: შანტრაპა) is a 2010 Georgian drama film written and directed by Otar Iosseliani. The film was selected as the Georgian entry for the Best Foreign Language Film at the 84th Academy Awards, but it did not make the final shortlist.

== Cast ==
- Dato Tarielachvili as Nicolas (as Dato Tarielashvili)
- Tamuna Karumidze as Barbara
- Fanny Gonin as Fanny
- Givi Sarchimelidze as Le grand-père
- Pierre Étaix as Le producteur français
- Bulle Ogier as Catherine
- Bogdan Stupka as L'ambassadeur
- Lasha Shevardnadze as Le mari de Barbara
- Nino Tchkheidze as La grand-mère
- Pascal Bonitzer as Un producteur
- Gela Katamadze as Nicolla
- Alexander Piatigorsky
- Yulian Panich

== See also ==
- List of submissions to the 84th Academy Awards for Best Foreign Language Film
- List of Georgian submissions for the Academy Award for Best Foreign Language Film
