= Red Sea Souk =

Film industry marketplace in Saudi Arabia

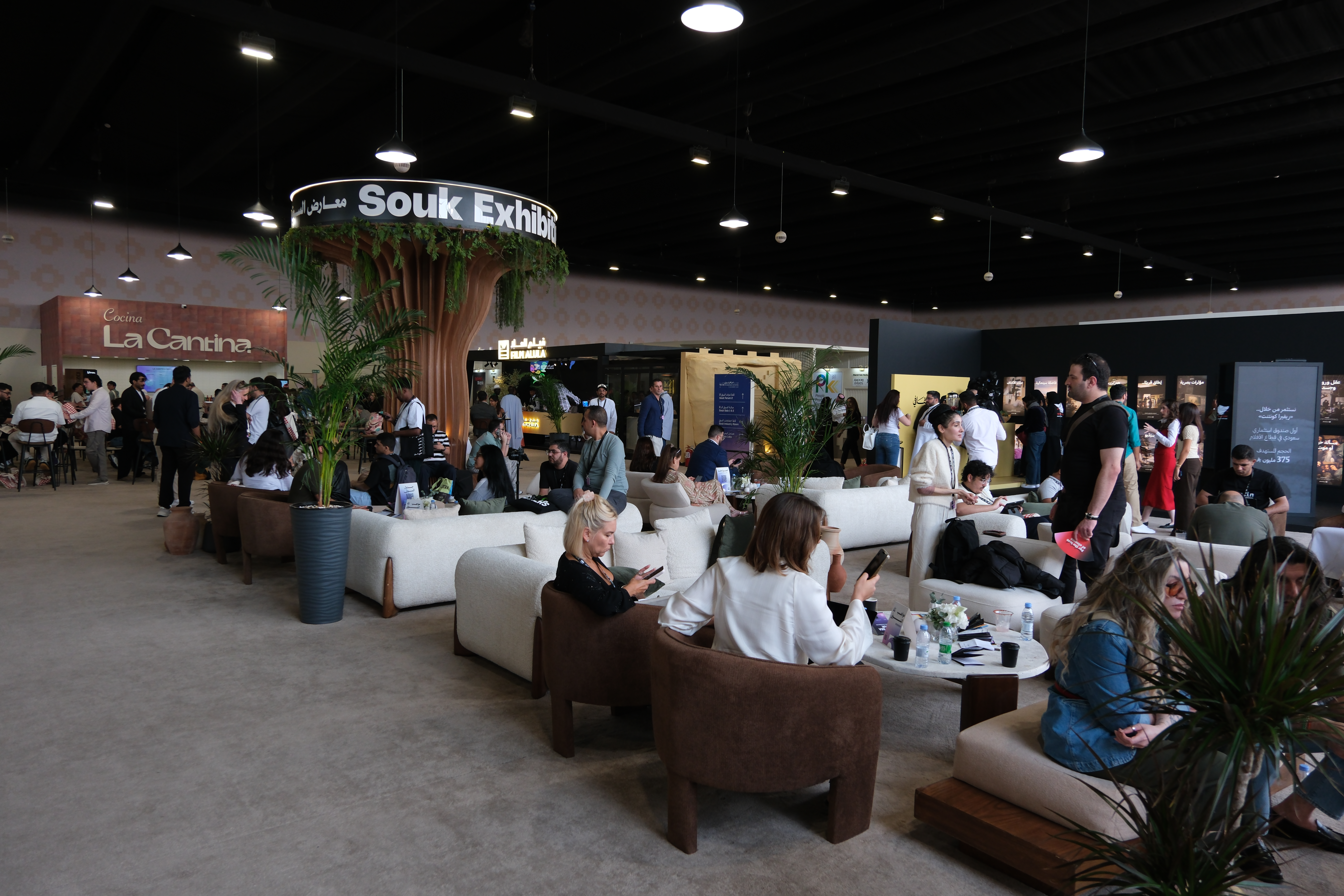
- Red Sea Souk in 2025
- Status: Active
- Genre: Film market
- Date: December
- Frequency: Annual
- Venue: Al-Balad
- Location: Jeddah
- Country: Saudi Arabia
- Inaugurated: 2021
- Organizer: Red Sea Film Foundation
- Website: redseafilmfest.com

The Red Sea Souk is the industry marketplace that takes place concurrent with the Saudi Arabian Rea Sea International Film Festival in Jeddah, Saudi Arabia. It has an emphasis on bringing together producers, financiers and film makers from the Middle East and North African region, as well as South Asia, East Asia, other parts of Africa.

== History ==
The first Red Sea Souk took place in 2021with 19 exhibitors, 11 of which were Saudi Arabian, in two small makeshift halls. It had 65 exhibitors in 2023. And by 2024, the souk hosted 142 exhibitors from 32 countries.

== Components ==
In addition to a trade fair, the souk showcases a number of curated projects in various stages of production that compete for financial grants from the Red Sea Fund and industry partners.

Most recently in 2025, the Red Sea Fund backed 10 jury-granted awards – 2 for works-in-progress, 6 for projects in development, and 2 for series projects, in addition to industry awards, which total around $700,000.
