= Boris Frumin =

Latvian film director

- Born: 24 October 1947 (age 78); Riga, Latvian SSR
- Occupations: Film director Screenwriter
- Years active: 1975-present

Boris Moiseevich Frumin (Russian: Борис Моисеевич Фрумин, Latvian: Boriss Frumins; born 24 October 1947) is a Soviet, American and Latvian film director and screenwriter.

== Career ==
Frumin's film Errors of Youth was screened in the Un Certain Regard section at the 1989 Cannes Film Festival. His project Siberian Triangle was presented at the 32nd Moscow International Film Festival. Frumin is an associate professor at NYU's Tisch School of the Arts, where he shares his passion for neo-realism and Eastern European film.

== Filmography ==
- Diary of a School Director (1975)
- Family Melodrama (1976)
- Errors of Youth (1978)
- Black and White (1992)
- Viva Castro! (1994)
- Nelegal (2006)
- Street Days (2010)
- Blind Dates (2013)
- Blizzard of Souls (2019; screenwriter)
