= Salt White =

2011 film

- Directed by: Keti Machavariani
- Written by: Keti Machavariani
- Produced by: Gia Bazgadze
- Release date: April 2011 (Tbilisi)
- Running time: 80 minutes
- Country: Georgia
- Language: Georgian

Salt White (Georgian: Marilivit tetri) is a 2011 Georgian drama film directed by Keti Machavariani.

== Cast ==
- Nino Koridze
- Gagi Svanidze
- Fea Tsivadze
