= Street Days =

2010 film

- Film poster
- Directed by: Levan Koguashvili
- Written by: Levan Koguashvili; Boris Frumin; Nikoloz Marri
- Produced by: Levan Korinteli; Archil Gelovani; Gia Bazgadze
- Starring: Guga Kotetishvili
- Cinematography: Archil Akhvlediani
- Edited by: Nodar Nozadze
- Music by: Rezo Kiknadze
- Release date: 20 January 2010
- Running time: 86 minutes
- Country: Georgia
- Language: Georgian

Street Days (Georgian: ქუჩის დღეები, translit. Kuchis dgeebi) is a 2010 Georgian drama film directed by Levan Koguashvili. The film was selected as the Georgian entry for the Best Foreign Language Film at the 83rd Academy Awards, but didn't make the final shortlist.

== Cast ==
- Guga Kotetishvili - Chekie
- Zura Begalishvili - Lado
- Gaga Chikhladze - Gurami
- Eka Chkheidze - Zaza's Wife
- Levan Jividze - Vaso
- Paata Khetaguri - Ero
- Dato Kinghuradze - Maca
- Giorgi Kipshidze - Jaba
- Rusiko Kobiashvili - Nini
- Zaza Kolelishvili - Sano
- Irakli Loladze - Givi
- Nikoloz Marri - Nika
- Tamriko Melikishvili - Luiza
- Irakli Ramishvili - Ika
- Zaza Salia - Tengo
- Zura Sharia - Zaza Cheishvili
- Merab Yolbaia - Dito

== Reviews ==
“…in the gritty, low-key realism of its strong performances, "Street" finds an absorbing mix of comic anguish and twisted hope—especially in the devastating self-knowledge of Kotetishvili's gaze.” – The Hollywood Reporter

“Georgian cinema has a new star in director Levan Koguashvili, whose superb neorealist drama, "Street Days," is just the calling card the beleaguered country needs. Stylistically and thematically reminiscent of new Romanian cinema, the pic plumbs the contentious, corrupt and crumbling social landscape of Georgia's capital, Tbilisi, while following a down-at-the-heels heroin addict struggling to protect a friend's son from corrupt cops. Lensed with impressive assurance and boasting powerful perfs from a combo of established pros and non-pros, "Street Days" looks poised to lead a Georgian renaissance spearheaded by fests and advancing into the arthouse circuit.” –Variety

“Mr. Koguashvili and his director of photography, Archil Akhvlediani, use the narrow streets and weathered buildings of Tbilisi, the Georgian capital, to great pictorial effect.” –The New York Times

== Awards ==
- Rotterdam International Film Festival - Tiger Award
- Edinburgh Film Festival - Rosebud Section
- goEast Film Festival - Golden Lily, Best Film
- Montreal World Film Festival - Focus on World Cinema
- European Film Festival Palić - Tolerance Award

== See also ==
- List of submissions to the 83rd Academy Awards for Best Foreign Language Film
- List of Georgian submissions for the Academy Award for Best Foreign Language Film
