= Moira (film) =

2015 film

- Film poster
- Directed by: Levan Tutberidze
- Written by: Levan Tutberidze
- Starring: Paata Inauri
- Release date: 23 September 2015 (San Sebastian)
- Running time: 89 minutes
- Country: Georgia
- Language: Georgian

Moira (Georgian: მოირა) is a 2015 Georgian drama film directed by Levan Tutberidze. It premiered at the 2015 San Sebastián International Film Festival. It was selected as the Georgian entry for the Best Foreign Language Film at the 88th Academy Awards but it was not nominated.

== Cast ==
- Paata Inauri

== See also ==
- List of submissions to the 88th Academy Awards for Best Foreign Language Film
- List of Georgian submissions for the Academy Award for Best Foreign Language Film
