= The Watchmaker =

2011 film

- Directed by: Giorgi Maskharashvili
- Written by: Giorgi Maskharashvili
- Produced by: Levan Bakhia
- Starring: Levan Berikashvili
- Cinematography: Giorgi Shvelidze
- Release date: March 2011
- Running time: 90 minutes
- Country: Georgia
- Language: Georgian

The Watchmaker (Georgian: Mesaate) is a 2011 Georgian crime film directed by Giorgi Maskharashvili.

== Cast ==
- Levan Berikashvili
- Dato Gotsiridze (as Datuna Gotsiridze)
- Giorgi Maskharashvili
- Giorgi Megrelishvili
- Giorgi Nakashidze
- Giorgi Tabidze
- Nino Tsotsoria
