= Born in Georgia =

2011 film

- Directed by: Tamar Shavgulidze
- Written by: Tamar Shavgulidze
- Produced by: Guka Rcheulishvili
- Starring: Nutsa Kukhianidze
- Cinematography: Giorgi Shvelidze
- Release date: 28 April 2011
- Running time: 80 minutes
- Country: Georgia
- Language: Georgian

Born in Georgia (Georgian: დაბადებული საქართველოში, translit Dabadebulebi sakartveloshi) is a 2011 Georgian drama film directed by Tamar Shavgulidze.

== Cast ==
- Nutsa Kukhianidze as Nuca kukhianidze
- Tamar Bziava as Tamri Bziava
- Vano Tarkhnishvili
- Giorgi Giorganashvili
