= Keep Smiling (2012 film) =

2012 film by Rusudan Chkonia

- Georgian theatrical poster
- Directed by: Rusudan Chkonia
- Written by: Rusudan Chkonia
- Produced by: Rusudan Chkonia
- Starring: Ia Sukhitashvili; Gia Roinishvili; Olga Babluani; Tamuna Bukhnikashvili; Nana Shonia; Shorena Begashvili; Maka Chichua; Eka Kartvelishvili
- Cinematography: Konstantine Esadze
- Edited by: Jean-Pierre Bloc; Rusudan Chkonia; Levan Kukhashvili
- Release dates: 6 September 2012 (Venice); 14 August 2013 (France)
- Running time: 91 minutes
- Countries: Georgia; France; Luxembourg
- Language: Georgian

Keep Smiling (Georgian: გაიღიმეთ, Gaigimet) is a 2012 internationally co-produced black comedy–drama written and directed by Rusudan Chkonia. The film was selected as the Georgian entry for the Best Foreign Language Oscar at the 85th Academy Awards, but it did not make the final list. The script was the winner of 2010 GNFC competition of debut full-length feature films and went on to be the most successful release in Georgia of 2012, also enjoying a theatrical run in French cinemas.

== Plot ==
A group of ten very different women are selected for the televised Georgian Mothers Contest, a thinly veiled beauty pageant incorporating a talent round, cooking skills, and even a bikini contest.

All are there with mixed agendas. Five of them, living in virtual poverty are eyeing the prize; USD$25,000 and a family apartment. Elene has been living in a hospital for many years with her family; the option of winning finally being a much needed way out. Feuding neighbours Inga and Gvantsa also are eager to escape their bare surroundings but for Gvantsa it's more of a chance to reignite her failed violinist career and leave behind the gossip of her past. Unfortunately, Gvantsa and fellow contestant Tamuna share a mutual friend that complicates rivalries even further.

Baya, a trophy wife, is the most glamorous of the contestants but also the most dubious entry, living in luxury with her adopted children almost as uninterested in the contest prize as Lizi, participating at the insistence of her mother who is determined to thrust her daughter into the limelight. The only thing they share in common is their reluctance and dismay at the tacky turns the contest takes as at what at first seems hopeful, gradually loses the glitter and the gold under the slow realization that the competition is an exploitative farce with its cold controlling director Otar keen to exploit anything that secures lucrative ratings. Tragic tales of war and poverty are woven in to entertain the audience using the very real tragedies that have befallen the contestants with also the paparazzi and sexual favors entering the mix as well. As conflicts heighten, the competition gradually turns sour behind the scenes with Otar eager to maintain complete control by bullying and humiliating anyone failing to fall in line.

== Production ==
Writer and director Rusudan Chkonia was inspired to write the film after meeting a woman who had been dragged through a humiliating and somewhat questionable beauty contest and the stories she shared. Early drafts of the screenplay had different lead protagonists before she settled on Gvantsa as the pivotal character as she was the most rebellious in nature of the women. The main location for the beauty contest scenes was a working theater, meaning filming could only be done at night when the theater was not in use. The film's financing was assisted by a Georgian state subsidy, which allocated 500,000 Georgian lari (GEL) to finance the film. Also, the film was created with the support of Georgian Ministry of Culture and Protection of Monuments.

== Cast ==
- Ia Sukhitashvili as Gvantsa
- Gia Roinishvili as Otar
- Olga Babluani as Elene
- Tamuna Bukhnikashvili as Irina
- Nana Shonia as Inga
- Shorena Begashvili as Baya
- Maka Chichua as Tamuna
- Eka Kartvelishvili as Alina
- Lela Metreveli as Lizi
- Ia Ninidze as Lizi's Mother
- Beka Elbakidze as Show Host

== See also ==
- List of submissions to the 85th Academy Awards for Best Foreign Language Film
- List of Georgian submissions for the Academy Award for Best Foreign Language Film
