= Giorgi Ovashvili =

Georgian film director, producer and screenwriter

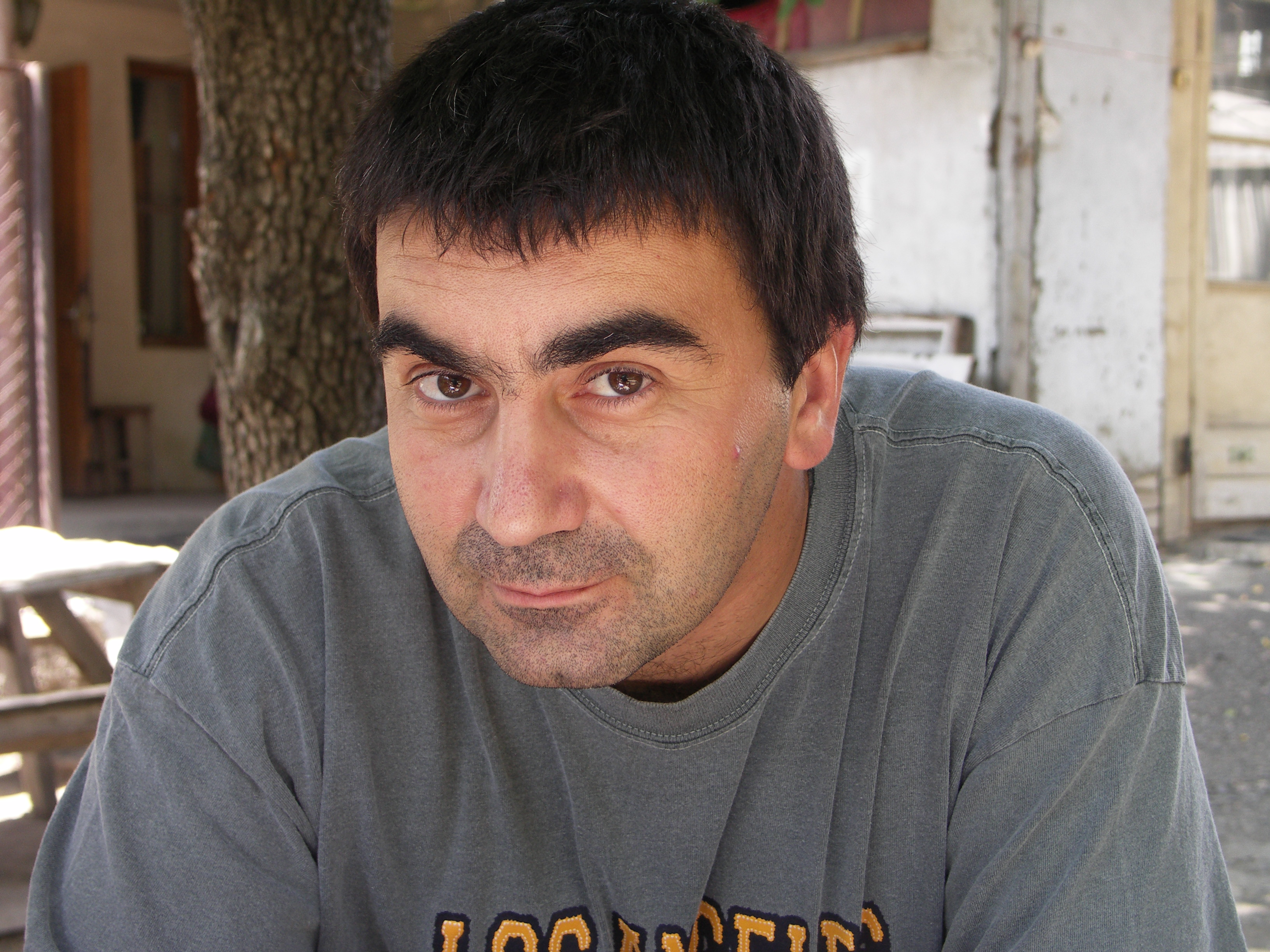

Giorgi Ovashvili (Georgian: გიორგი ოვაშვილი; a.k.a. George) is a Georgian film director and screenwriter, known for his 2014 film Corn Island.

== Early life and education ==
Giorgi Ovashvili is a graduate of the film department of the Georgian State University of Cinema and Theatre (1996) and the filmmaking department of the New York Film Academy at Universal Studios in Hollywood (2006).

== Career ==
Ovashvili made his debut as director with two short films, "Wagonnet" (1997) and "Eye Level" (2005).

His first feature film, The Other Bank, premiered at the Berlin Film Festival's Generation section in 2009 and won over 50 international prizes, and was nominated at European Film Awards in the category "European Discovery".

His second feature, Corn Island, won the Crystal Globe at Karlovy Vary International Film Festival as well as the Grand Prix "Golden Vine" award at Kinoshock in 2014, and in 2015 took a top prize at the Trieste Film Festival and was shortlisted for the Academy's best foreign-language film in 2015.

Khibula (2017) was dedicated to the recent history of Georgia. The film was premiered in the main competition of Karlovy Vary IFF in 2017.

As of 2022 Ovashvili is working on The Moon is a Father of Mine.

== Production company ==
After having produced his own works, Ovashvili established his own film production company in 2016, Wagonnet Films, in Tbilisi.

== Recognition and awards ==
In 2015, Ovashvili received a special award named "High Priest of Culture", along with director Zaza Urushadze, for contributing to and promoting Georgian cinema internationally.

== Filmography ==
=== Director ===
- Beautiful Helen (2022)
- Khibula (2017)
- Corn Island (2014)
- Gagma napiri (2009), The Other Bank
- Eye Level... (2005)
- Wagonette (1997)

=== Screenwriter ===
- Beautiful Helen (2022)
- Khibula (2017)
- "corn island" (2014)
- Gagma napiri (2009) (adaptation), The Other Bank
- Eye Level... (2005)
- Wagonnet (1996)

=== Producer ===
- Beautiful Helen (2022)
- Khibula (2017)
- "corn island" (2014)
- Gagma napiri (2009) (producer), "The Other Bank"
- Eye Level... (2005) (co-producer) (executive producer)
- Wagonnet (1996)

=== Self - TV ===
- Euro Video Grand Prix (2006) (TV) .... Himself - Jury Member
