= In Bloom (film) =

2013 film

- Film festival poster
- Directed by: Nana Ekvtimishvili; Simon Groß
- Written by: Nana Ekvtimishvili
- Produced by: Simon Groß; Marc Wächter
- Starring: Lika Babluani; Mariam Bokeria
- Cinematography: Oleg Mutu
- Edited by: Stefan Stabenow
- Distributed by: Big World Pictures
- Release dates: 19 February 2013 (Berlin); 19 September 2013 (Georgia)
- Running time: 102 minutes
- Country: Georgia
- Language: Georgian

In Bloom (Georgian: გრძელი ნათელი დღეები, romanized: Grdzeli nateli dgheebi) is a 2013 Georgian drama film directed by Nana Ekvtimishvili and Simon Groß. It is a bildungsroman focused on the friendship between two teenage girls in 1992 after the country’s independence from the Soviet Union. The artistic style is influenced by post-communist Romanian cinema, particularly by cameraman Oleg Mutu, who also worked on 4 Months, 3 Weeks and 2 Days (2007).

The film premiered at the 63rd Berlin International Film Festival, winning the C.I.C.A.E. Prize. It was selected as the Georgian entry for the Best Foreign Language Film at the 86th Academy Awards.

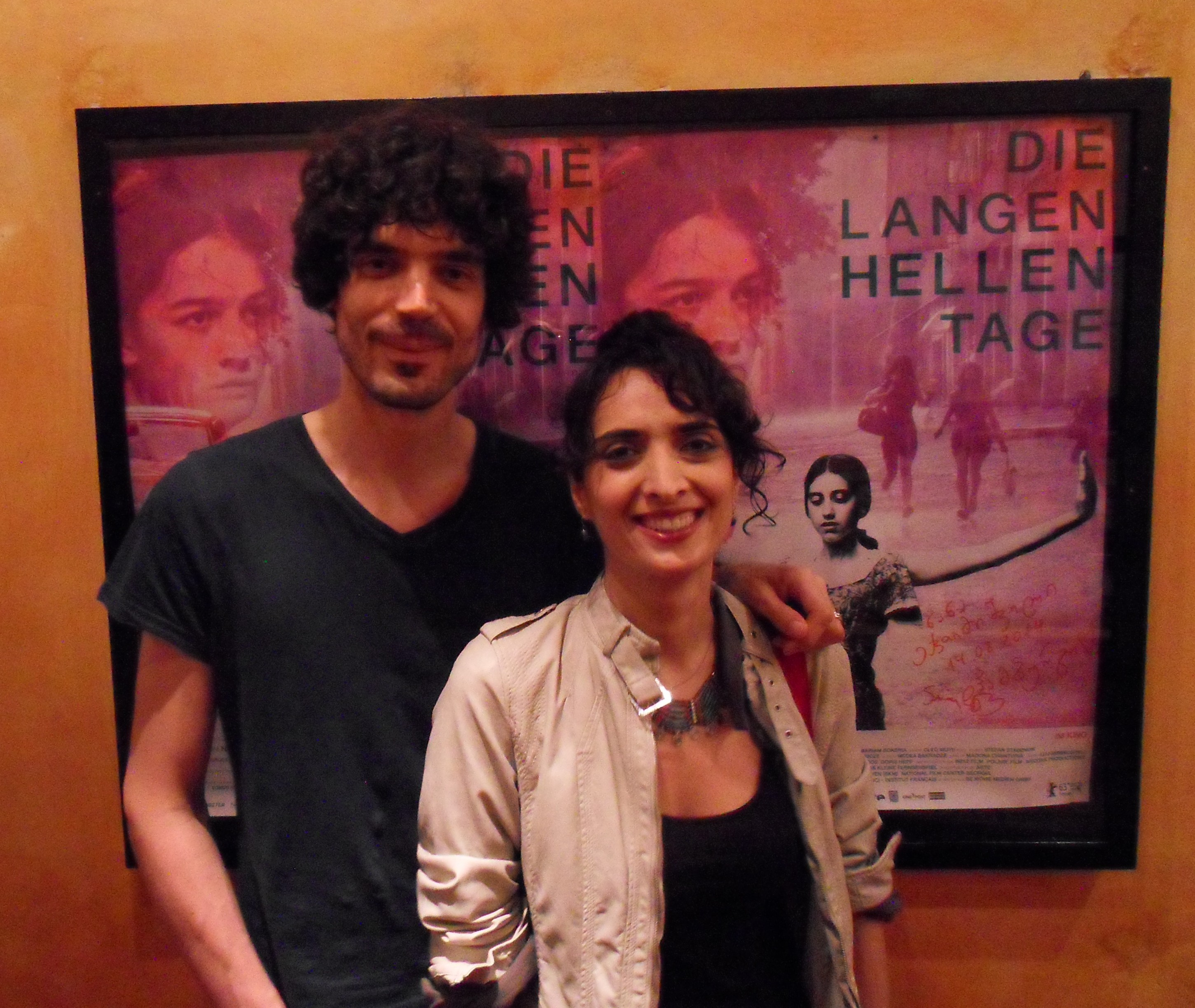
Nana Ekvtimishvili and Simon Groß

== Plot ==
Natia and Eka are two fourteen year old best friends living in Tbilisi in 1992 after Zviad Gamsakhurdia was deposed and during the Georgian Civil War. Natia is the more vivacious of the two girls, though she has an alcoholic and abusive father. Eka lives with her older sister and mother, while her father is in prison.

Natia has two boys who are interested in her, Kote, and Lado. Lado tells her that he is going to Moscow to visit his uncle but, before he leaves, he gives her a gun with a single bullet. Natia is impressed, believing the gift is Lado's way of taking care of her. After witnessing Eka being bullied on her way home by two boys, Natia forces the gun on her and tells her to use it to intimidate the boys as violence is the only language they understand. However, walking home Eka sees two other boys beating up Kopla, one of the boys that bullies her. Initially intending to ignore the situation, she ends up using the gun to threaten the boys.

Later, while Natia is out to buy bread, Kote seizes her and drags her into a car with his friends. Despite Eka's efforts to intervene, they are unsuccessful. Eka then confronts the adults who have failed to prevent Natia's abduction, berating them until one of the men strikes her down. Eka attends Natia's wedding, though she is saddened by her friend's circumstances. She returns the gun to Natia without disclosing her encounter with Kopla.

Natia's initial, tentative happiness in her marriage quickly fades. During a visit from Eka, Natia confesses her longing for school and her dissatisfaction with living among her husband's family, who are overly controlling and discourage her from seeing old friends. After they thwart her plans for a birthday party, Natia sneaks out to spend the day with Eka at her grandmother's house, where she also encounters Lado. She is apprehended by her husband, Kote, who, driven by jealousy, forcibly takes her away. Later he gathers up a group of his friends and attacks Lado, culminating in Lado being stabbed and killed. Hearing of the murder, Natia becomes incensed and goes to get the gun, but Eka beats her to her house and keeps it from her long enough to calm her down and prevent her from going to kill Kote. The two end up going to a pond, where Eka throws the gun in the water. Later Eka, who has always refused to visit her father in jail, goes to see him by herself.

== Cast ==
- Lika Babluani as Eka Khizanishvili
- Mariam Bokeria as Natia Zaridze
- Zurab Gogaladze as Kote
- Data Zakareishvili as Lado
- Ana Nijaradze as Ana - Ekas Mother
- Maiko Ninua as Sophiko - Ekas Sister
- Tamar Bukhnikashvili as Natia's Mother
- Temiko Chichinadze as Natia's Father
- Berta Khapava as Natela - Natia's Grandmother
- Sandro Shanshiashvili as Natia's brother
- Endi Dzidzava as Kote's Mother
- Zaza Salia as Kote's Father

== Reception ==
On review aggregate website Rotten Tomatoes, In Bloom has an approval rating of 90% based on 51 reviews. The website’s critics consensus reads, "A coming-of-age drama entwined with a political statement, In Bloom underscores its well-worn themes with strong performances and palpable real-world tension." Metacritic, which uses a weighted average, assigned the film a score of 72 out of 100, based on 19 critics, indicating "generally favorable" reviews. Variety defined it as "an intimate drama about two very young woman destined by differences of class and character for very different fates, and also as a portrait of a fascinating period in the country's social history".

== See also ==
- List of submissions to the 86th Academy Awards for Best Foreign Language Film
- List of Georgian submissions for the Academy Award for Best Foreign Language Film
