= Blind Dates =

2013 film by Levan Koguashvili

- Film poster
- Directed by: Levan Koguashvili
- Written by: Boris Frumin; Levan Koguashvili
- Starring: Kakhi Kavsadze
- Cinematography: Tato Kotetishvili
- Release dates: 6 September 2013 (TIFF); 2 December 2013 (Georgia)
- Running time: 95 minutes
- Country: Georgia
- Language: Georgian

Blind Dates (Georgian: შემთხვევითი პაემნები Brma Paemnebi) is a 2013 Georgian drama film directed by Levan Koguashvili. It was screened in the Contemporary World Cinema section at the 2013 Toronto International Film Festival. It also won the Best Feature Film award at the 2014 Zagreb Film Festival.

== Cast ==
- Kakhi Kavsadze
- Andro Sakvarelidze as Sandro
- Ia Sukhitashvili as Manana
