= Rusudan Chkonia =

Georgian film director (born 1978)

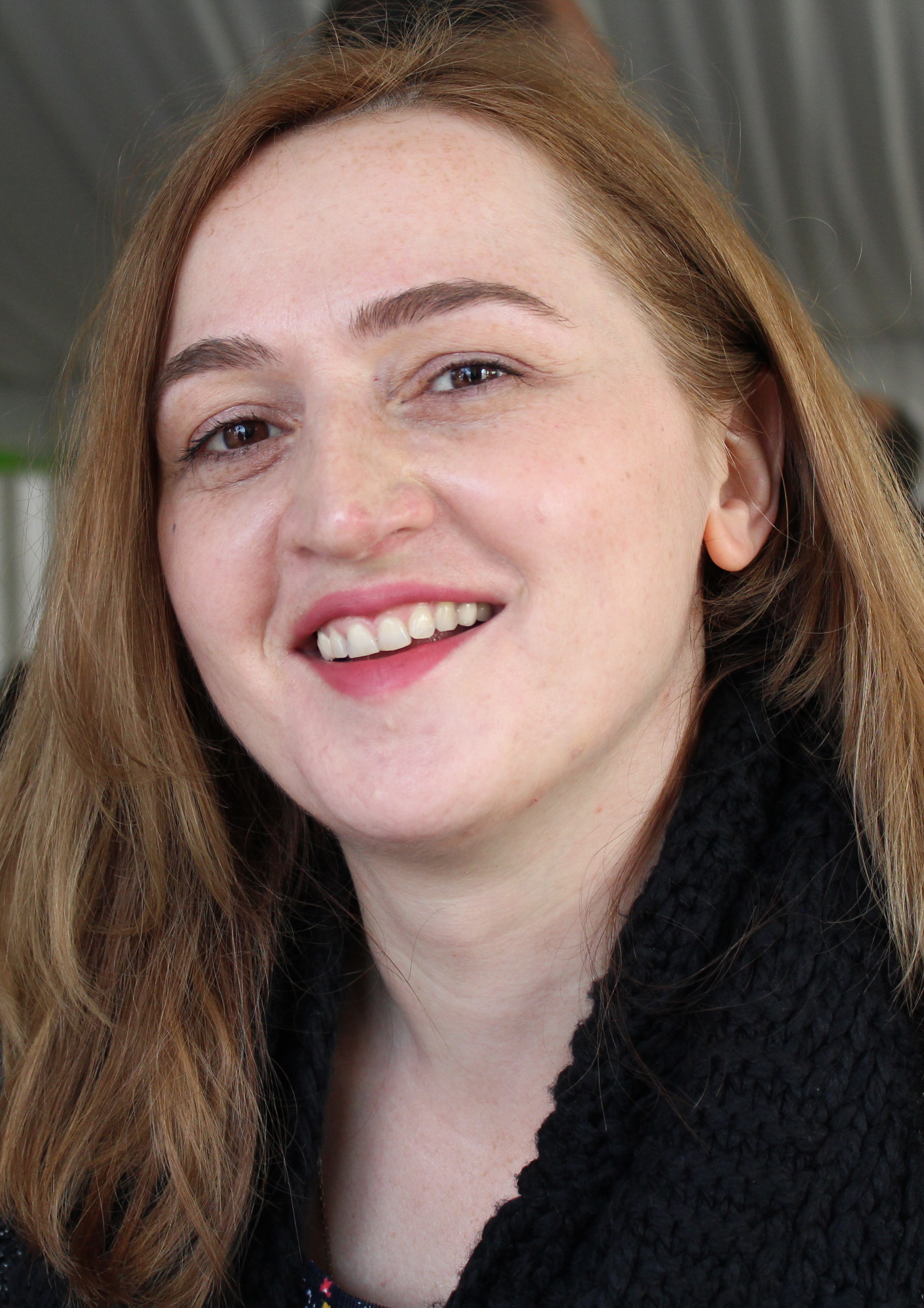
- Born: რუსუდან ჭყონია 25 May 1978 (age 48); Tbilisi, Soviet Union
- Occupation: filmmaker

Rusudan Chkonia (also spelled Rusudan Chqonia; Georgian: რუსუდან ჭყონია; born 25 April 1978) is a Georgian film director, scriptwriter and actress.

== Life ==
Chkonia was born in 1978. In 2001, she graduated in film studies and directed the films Bediani – Lucky Village and Children Without a Name which were both documentaries.

She wrote and then produced and directed the 2012 film Keep Smiling.
