= Nana Ekvtimishvili =

Georgian writer and director

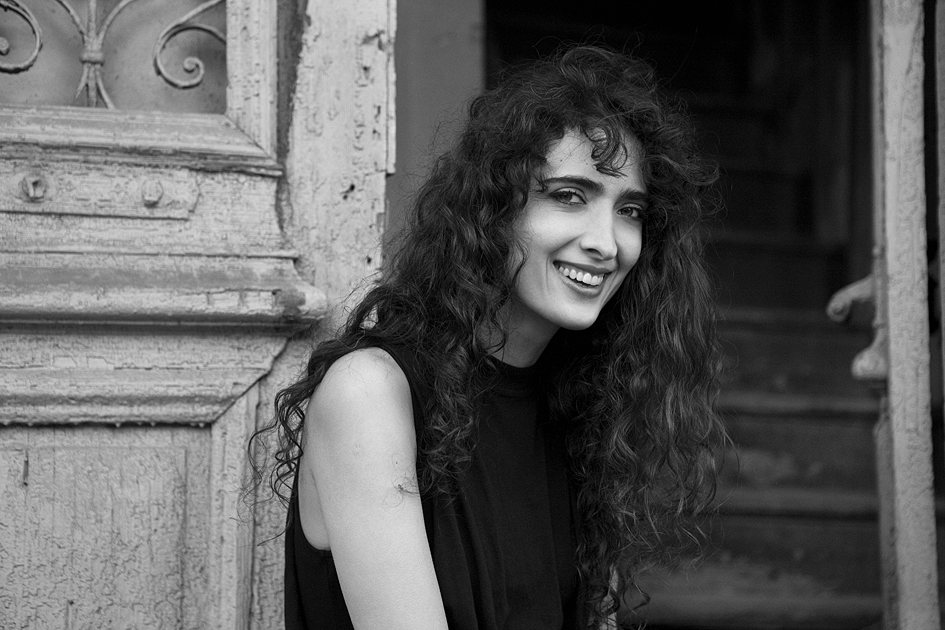
Nana Ekvtimishvili 2013

Nana Ekvtimishvili (Georgian: ნანა ექვთიმიშვილი born 9 July 1978 in Tbilisi, Georgia) is a Georgian writer and director.

== Biography ==
Nana Ekvtimishvili studied philosophy at the Ivane Javakhishvili State University of Tbilisi. She studied screenwriting and dramaturgy at the Academy of Film and Television (HFF) in Potsdam-Babelsberg. Her stories were first published in 1999 in the Georgian literary magazine Arili in Georgia.

After writing prose and screenplays, in 2011 she directed the short film Deda / Waiting for Mum. In 2012, with Simon Groß, she completed her first feature film, In Bloom (გრძელი ნათელი დღეები, Grdzeli Nateli Dgheebi).

In Bloom premiered at the 63rd Berlin International Film Festival in 2013 and won the award of the International Confederation of Art Cinema - the CICAE Award. It also won numerous awards at other international film festivals, including in Hong Kong, Tokyo, Paris, Los Angeles and Sarajevo, and is an Oscar entry for 2014 for the Academy Award for Best Foreign Language Film from Georgia.

In 2013 Ekvtimishvili, with Simon Gross, was chosen among the ten most promising European directors from Varietyʼs Ten Directors to Watch at the 48th Karlovy Vary Film Festival.

At the Berlin International Film Festival in 2013, In Bloom was referred to as the birth of the new Georgian wave. In Hong Kong, the film was named as the spring of Georgian cinema. The International Federation of Film Critics (FIPRESCI) has called the film a sign of the rebirth of Georgian film.

In 2015 Ekvtimishvili's first novel, "The Pear Field", was published by Bakur Sulakauri Publishing in Georgia. In 2018 "The Pear Field" was published in a German translation by Suhrkamp Publishing, Germany, as "Das Birnenfeld". In 2020 "The Pear Field" was published in English translation by Peirene, UK.

== Filmography ==
- My Happy Family (2017)
- In Bloom (2013)
- Waiting for Mum (2011)
- Lost Mainland (2008)
- Fata Morgana (2007)

== Novels ==
- The Pear Field (2015)

== Literary awards ==
- 2016 Saba Award for the debut for the novel "The Pear Field"
- 2016 Ilia University Literary Award for the best Georgian novel of 2014-2015 for "The Pear Field"
- 2016 Litera Award for the debut novel "The Pear Field"
- Longlisted for the 2021 International Booker Prize for "The Pear Field"
- Finalist for the EBRD Literature Prize 2021

== Cinema awards ==
For In Bloom (2013)

- C.I.C.A.E. PRIZE of the International Confederation of Art House Cinemas, the 63rd Berlin Film Festival
- Young Cinema Competition prize the 37th Hong Kong International Film Festival
- FIPRESCI Prize the 37th Hong Kong International Film Festival
- SKODA Film Award the 13th Festival of Central and Eastern Film GOEAST, Wiesbaden, Germany
- Blue Angel Award for Best Director the 21st Art Film Festival in Slovakia
- Grazia Magazine Award the Paris Cinema International Film Festival
- Grand Prix at the 4th Voices Volodga Independent Cinema from European Screen, Béla Tarr, Chairman of the Jury
- Five Lake Film Festival Young Cinema Award, Germany
- The Heart of Sarajevo, 19th Sarajevo Film Festival for Best Film
- Audience Award the Milano Film Festival
- Student Award the Milano Film Festival
- Grand Prix, Eurasia International Film Festival, Almaty, Kazakhstan. Jane Campion, Head of the Jury
- Best Script Award, International Women's Film Festival in Salé (Film Femmes Méditerranée de Salé), Salé, Morocco
- Special Jury Prize, 42nd Festival du nouveau cinéma in Montréal, Canada
- Best Film, Duhok International Film Festival, Iraq
- Special Commendation of Jury, Prix Europa
- Best Film Award, Minsk International Film Festival, Belarus
- New Auteurs Special Award for Personal Storytelling, AFI Fest, Los Angeles, USA
- Golden Goat for the best full-length film for young people, International Young Audience Film Festival Ale Kino in Poznań, Poland
- Golden Star for the Best Film, Cinedays Film Festival in Skopje, Macedonia
- Crystal Apricot for the Best Film, 4th Film Festival, Malatya, Turkey
- Grand Prize the 15th Tokyo Filmex, Mohsen Mahmalbah, Chairman of the Jury
- Best Georgian Film the 16th Tbilisi International Film Festival, Tbilisi, Georgia
- Second Award for Feature Director International Women's Film Festival, Rehovot, Israel
- The Bronze Djed, Luxor Egyptian and European Film Festival, Luxor, Egypt

For Waiting for Mum (2011-2012)

- Best short film Trieste Film Festival, Italy
- Special Mention Tbilisi International Film Festival, Georgia
