= The Other Bank =

- Directed by: Giorgi Ovashvili
- Release date: 7 February 2009 (BIFF)
- Running time: 90 minutes
- Country: Georgia
- Languages: Georgian, Abkhaz, Russian

The Other Bank (Georgian: გაღმა ნაპირი) is a 2009 Georgian drama film directed by Giorgi Ovashvili. It was Georgia's submission to the 82nd Academy Award for the Academy Award for Best Foreign Language Film. It won best film award in 11th Dhaka International Film Festival.
