= Levan Koguashvili =

Georgian film director and screenwriter (born 1973)

- Born: Levan Koguashvili; 18 November 1973 (age 52); Tbilisi, Georgian SSR, Soviet Union
- Occupations: Film director, producer, screenwriter
- Years active: 2006–present
- Notable work: Blind Dates (2013)

Levan Koguashvili (Georgian: ლევან კოღუაშვილი; born 18 March 1973) is a Georgian film director and screenwriter. He studied in Gerasimov Institute of Cinematography after graduating school.

== Biography ==
Levan Koguashvili was born in 1973 in Tbilisi, modern-day Georgia. He began his studies at the State Institute of Film and Theatre in Tbilisi, and then worked as a journalist for independent television after the civil war broke out in Georgia. He studied Film Directing at the Russian State University of Cinematography (VGIK) in Moscow between 1994 and 1999.

He graduated from the Tisch School of Arts' Graduate Film Program in New York City in 2006 and he made several short films and documentaries. His 2006 short film, The Debt, was an official selection of the 2006 Sundance Film Festival, and his documentary, Women from Georgia, was selected for the Panorama section of the 2009 Sarajevo Film Festival.

Levan lived in New York City where he made several short films and documentaries. His first feature film, Street Days, which was made in 2010, won several international prizes including Tiger Award at Rotterdam International Film Festival. The Hollywood Reporter observed that "absurdity and despair, in equal measure, infuse the decaying urban landscape of the Tbilisi-set Street Days."

His second feature Blind Dates, made in 2013, won the Special Jury Award at the 2013 Abu Dhabi Film Festival in "section New Horizons".

His third feature, Brighton 4th, in 2021, won the best picture award at the Asian World Film Festival in Los Angeles, and three awards each at the Tribeca Film Festival and FilmFestival Cottbus.

== Filmography ==
=== Feature films ===
Year	English Title	Original Title	Notes
2010	Street Days	ქუჩის დღეები	
2013	Blind Dates	შემთხვევითი პაემნები	
2021	Brighton 4th	მეოთხე ბრაიტონი	
2026	Guria		

=== Short film ===
- The Debt (2006)

=== Documentary films ===
- Women from Georgia (2009)
- Gogita's New Life (2016)
