= European art cinema =

Film genre in Europe

European art cinema is a branch of cinema that was popular in the latter half of the 20th century. It is based on a rejection of the tenets and techniques of classical Hollywood cinema.

== History ==
European art cinema gained popularity in the 1950s down to the 1970s, with notable filmmakers such as Federico Fellini, Michelangelo Antonioni, and Ingmar Bergman. At this time it was new to the even broader field of art cinema.

== Differences from classical cinema ==
The continuity editing system is not necessarily abandoned but instead is not needed. The cause and effect driven narrative, as well as the goal-oriented protagonist are also not needed. Instead, we may have the protagonist wander around aimlessly for the whole movie, with nothing of real importance happening to drive him from one activity to the other.

Classical Hollywood cinema has a narrative transitivity, in which there is "a sequence of events in which each unit follows the one preceding it according to a chain of causation; this chain is usually psychological". The 'tale over teller' mantra of the classical Hollywood cinema is closely linked to the editing form that classical Hollywood cinema takes, and the rules they impose. For example, the 180-degree rule is followed since crossing the 180-degree line will cause a disturbance or a jarring effect on the viewer, thus calling attention away from story and to the teller. Jump cuts are avoided, since they can cause an ellipsis of the spatial or temporal kind. It is the job of classical Hollywood cinema to get the audience lost and absorbed into the story of the film, so that the film is pleasurable. In contrast the task of European art cinema is to be ambiguous, utilizing an open-ended (and sometimes intertextual) plot, causing the audience to ask questions themselves whilst introducing an element of subjectivity.

Another way they differ in terms of ‘realism’ is that Hollywood classical cinema has characters in full make up all the time, even when just coming out of bed; whereas European art cinema strives for a representation of the 'truth' and may not have characters in costume or make up.

== Notable selected films ==
- Diary of a Country Priest (Robert Bresson, 1951)
- Ordet (Carl Theodor Dreyer, 1955)
- The Seventh Seal (Ingmar Bergman, 1957)
- A Man Escaped (Robert Bresson, 1956)
- Wild Strawberries (Ingmar Bergman, 1957)
- The 400 Blows (François Truffaut, 1959)
- Pickpocket (Robert Bresson, 1959)
- L'Avventura (Michelangelo Antonioni, 1960)
- Breathless (Jean-Luc Godard, 1960)
- Last Year at Marienbad (Alain Resnais, 1960)
- La Dolce Vita (Federico Fellini, 1960)
- My Life to Live (Jean-Luc Godard, 1962)
- La notte (Michelangelo Antonioni, 1961)
- L'eclisse (Michelangelo Antonioni, 1962)
- Alaverdoba (Giorgi Shengelaia, 1962)
- La Jetée (Chris Marker, 1962)
- Cleo from 5 to 7 (Agnès Varda, 1963)
- Ivan's Childhood (Andrei Tarkovsky, 1962)
- 8 1/2 (Federico Fellini, 1963)
- The Leopard (Luchino Visconti, 1963)
- Contempt (Jean-Luc Godard, 1963)
- Gertrud (Carl Theodor Dreyer, 1964)
- The Gospel According to St. Matthew (Pier Paolo Pasolini, 1964)
- Shadows of Forgotten Ancestors (Sergei Parajanov, 1965)
- Persona (Ingmar Bergman, 1966)
- The Battle of Algiers (Gillo Pontecorvo, 1966)
- Pierrot le Fou (Jean-Luc Godard, 1966)
- Au hasard Balthazar (Robert Bresson, 1966)
- Andrei Rublev (Andrei Tarkovsky, 1966)
- The Plea (Tengiz Abuladze, 1967)
- Two or Three Things I Know About Her (Jean-Luc Godard, 1967)
- Weekend (Jean-Luc Godard, 1967)
- Great Green Valley (Merab Kokochashvili, 1967)
- Belle de Jour (Luis Bunuel, 1967)
- Mouchette (Robert Bresson, 1968)
- The Color of Pomegranates (Sergei Parajanov, 1968)
- Pirosmani (Giorgi Shengelaia, 1969)
- The Conformist (Bernardo Bertolucci, 1970)
- Aguirre, the Wrath of God (Werner Herzog, 1972)
- Cries and Whispers (Ingmar Bergman, 1972)
- The Discreet Charm of the Bourgeoisie (Luis Bunuel, 1972)
- Day for Night (François Truffaut, 1973)
- Amarcord (Federico Fellini, 1973)
- Ali: Fear Eats the Soul (Rainer Werner Fassbinder, 1974)
- The American Friend (Wim Wenders, 1977)
- Nosferatu the Vampyre (Werner Herzog, 1979)
- Stalker (Andrei Tarkovsky, 1979)

== Literature ==
- Dobi, Stephen J., Cinema 16: America's Largest Film Society. Unpublished Doctoral Dissertation, New York University, 1984
