= Pirosmani =

Pirosmani may refer to:

- Niko Pirosmani (1862–1918), Georgian painter
- Pirosmani (film), a 1969 Soviet biographical film about the painter
- Pirosmani, an administrative unit of Dedoplistsqaro Municipality, Georgia
