= 1964 Cannes Film Festival =

- Official poster of the 17th Cannes Film Festival, an original illustration by Jean-Claude Moreau.
- Opening film: Greed in the Sun
- Location: Cannes, France
- Founded: 1946
- Awards: Grand Prix: The Umbrellas of Cherbourg
- No. of films: 25 (In Competition)
- Festival date: 29 April 1964 – 14 May 1964
- Website: festival-cannes.com/en

Cannes Film Festival
- 1965 1963

The 17th Cannes Film Festival took place from 29 April to 14 May 1964. Austrian filmmaker Fritz Lang served as jury president for the main competition.

On this edition, the Palme d’Or was renamed "Grand Prix du Festival International du Film", a name that remained in use until 1974, after which it was renamed Palme d'Or again. The Grand Prix went to The Umbrellas of Cherbourg by Jacques Demy.

The festival opened with Greed in the Sun by Henri Verneuil.

== Juries ==
=== Main Competition ===
- Fritz Lang, Austrian filmmaker - Jury President
- Charles Boyer, French-American actor - Vice President
- Joaquín Calvo-Sotelo, Spanish
- René Clément, French filmmaker
- Jean-Jacques Gautier, French writer and journalist
- Alexandre Karaganov, Soviet film critic
- Lorens Marmstedt, Swedish producer
- Geneviève Page, French actress
- Raoul Ploquin, French producer and writer
- Arthur M. Schlesinger Jr., American writer
- Véra Volmane, French journalist

=== Short Films Competition ===
- Jean-Jacques Languepin, French – Vice President
- Jiří Brdečka, Czechoslovak filmmaker
- Robert Ménégoz, French
- Hubert Seggelke, West-German
- Alex Seiler, Swiss

== Official selection ==
=== In Competition ===
The following feature films competed for the Grand Prix du Festival International du Film:

English title	Original title	Director(s)	Production country
Alone Across the Pacific	太平洋ひとりぼっち	Kon Ichikawa	Japan
The Ape Woman	La donna scimmia	Marco Ferreri	Italy, France
Barren Lives	Vidas secas	Nelson Pereira dos Santos	Brazil
Black God, White Devil	Deus e o Diabo na Terra do Sol	Glauber Rocha	Brazil
The Cry	Křik	Jaromil Jireš	Czechoslovakia
Dead Woman from Beverly Hills	Die Tote von Beverly Hills	Michael Pfleghar	West Germany
Drama of the Lark	Pacsirta	László Ranódy	Hungary
The Girl in Mourning	La niña de luto	Manuel Summers	Spain
Greed in the Sun	Cent mille dollars au soleil	Henri Verneuil	France, Italy
Last Night	الليلة الأخيرة	Kamal El Sheikh	Egypt
Me First	Primero yo	Fernando Ayala	Argentina
Mujhe Jeene Do		Moni Bhattacharjee	India
One Potato, Two Potato		Larry Peerce	United States
Passenger	Pasażerka	Andrzej Munk	Poland
The Pumpkin Eater		Jack Clayton	United Kingdom
Raven's End	Kvarteret Korpen	Bo Widerberg	Sweden
The Red Lanterns	Τα κόκκινα φανάρια	Vasilis Georgiadis	Greece
Seduced and Abandoned	Sedotta e abbandonata	Pietro Germi	Italy, France
The Soft Skin	La Peau Douce	François Truffaut	France, Portugal
The Umbrellas of Cherbourg	Les Parapluies de Cherbourg	Jacques Demy	France, West Germany
Walking the Streets of Moscow	Я шагаю по Москве	Georgiy Daneliya	Soviet Union
The White Caravan	თეთრი ქარავანი	Eldar Shengelaia and Tamaz Meliava	Soviet Union
Woman in the Dunes	砂の女	Hiroshi Teshigahara	Japan
The World of Henry Orient		George Roy Hill	United States
The Visit		Bernhard Wicki	United States, France, West Germany, Italy

=== Out of Competition ===
The following films were selected to be screened out of competition:

English title	Original title	Director(s)	Production country
The Fall of the Roman Empire		Anthony Mann	United States
Skoplje '63		Veljko Bulajić	Yugoslavia
White Voices	Le voci bianche	Pasquale Festa Campanile and Massimo Franciosa	Italy

=== Short Films Competition ===
The following short films competed for the Short Film Palme d'Or:

- 1,2,3... by Gyula Macskássy, Gyorgy Varnai
- Age Of The Buffalo by Austin Campbell
- Clair obscur by George Sluizer
- Dawn Of The Capricorne by Ahmad Faroughy-Kadjar
- Flora nese smrt by Jiri Papousek
- Help ! My Snowman's Burning Down by Carson Davidson
- Himalayan Lakes by Dr. Gopal Datt
- Kedd by Mark Novak
- La douceur du village by François Reichenbach
- La fuite en Egypte by Waley Eddin Sameh
- Lacrimae rerum by Nicolas Nicolaides
- Lamb by Paulin Soumanou Vieyra
- Las murallas de Cartagena by Francisco Norden
- Le prix de la victoire (Défi) by Nobuko Shibuya
- Li mali mestieri by Gianfranco Mingozzi
- Marines Flamandes by Lucien Deroisy
- Max Ernst Entdeckungsfahrten ins Unbewusste by Carl Lamb & Peter Schamoni
- Medju oblacima by Dragan Mitrovic
- Memoria Trandafirului by Sergiu Nicolaescu
- Sillages by Serge Roullet
- The Peaches by Michael Gill
- The Raisin Salesman by William Melendez

== Parallel section ==
=== International Critics' Week ===
The following feature films were screened for the 3rd International Critics' Week (3e Semaine de la Critique):

- Before the Revolution (Prima della rivoluzione) by Bernardo Bertolucci (Italy)
- Ganga Zumba by Carlos Diégues (Brazil)
- Goldstein by Philip Kaufman, Benjamin Manaster (United States)
- La Herencia by Ricardo Alventosa (Argentina)
- Joseph Kilian by Pavel Juracek, Jan Schmidt (Czechoslovakia)
- The Parallel Street (Die Parallelstrasse) by Ferdinand Khittl (West Germany)
- Something Different (O necem jinem) by Vera Chytilová (Czechoslovakia)
- Point of Order by Emile de Antonio (United States)
- La nuit du bossu by Farrokh Ghaffari (Iran)
- La vie à l’envers by Alain Jessua (France)

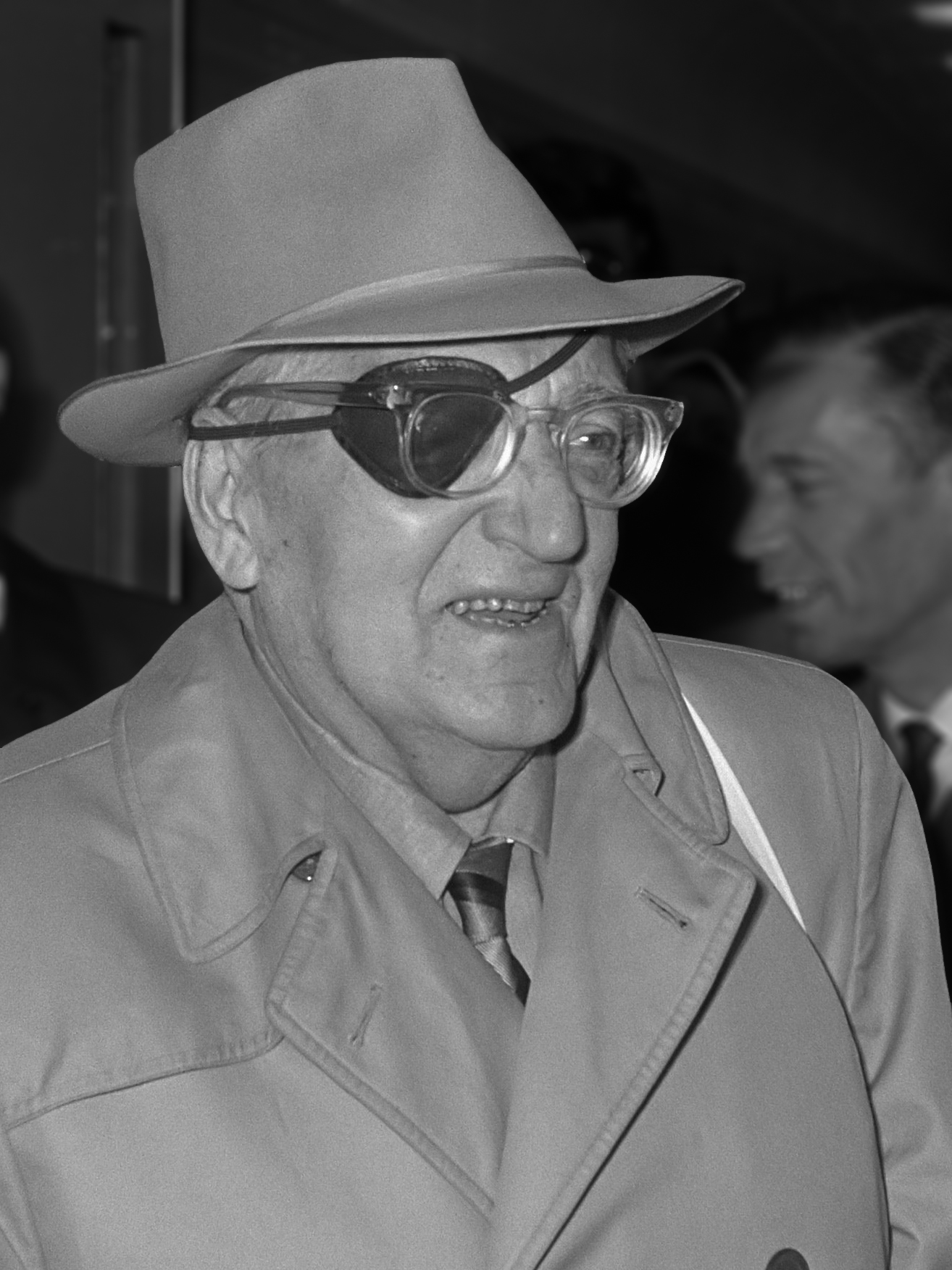
Fritz Lang, Jury President

== Official Awards ==
=== Main Competition ===
- Grand Prix du Festival International du Film: The Umbrellas of Cherbourg by Jacques Demy
- Prix spécial du Jury: The Woman in the Dunes by Hiroshi Teshigahara
- Best Actress:
  - Anne Bancroft for The Pumpkin Eater
  - Barbara Barrie for One Potato, Two Potato
- Best Actor:
  - Antal Páger for Drama of the Lark
  - Saro Urzì for Seduced and Abandoned
- Special Mention: Andrzej Munk for Passenger and his entire work

=== Short Films Competition ===
- Grand Prix du Jury:
  - Le prix de la victoire by Nobuko Shibuya
  - La douceur du village by François Reichenbach
- Prix spécial du Jury:
  - Help! My Snowman's Burning Down by Carson Davidson
  - Sillages by Serge Roullet
- Short Film Technical Prize: Dawn Of The Capricorne by Ahmad Faroughy-Kadjar

== Independent Awards ==
=== FIPRESCI Prize ===
- Passenger by Andrzej Munk

=== Commission Supérieure Technique ===
- Technical Grand Prize:
  - The Umbrellas of Cherbourg by Jacques Demy
  - Dead Woman from Beverly Hills by Michael Pfleghar

=== OCIC Award ===
- The Umbrellas of Cherbourg by Jacques Demy
- Vidas secas by Nelson Pereira dos Santos

=== Kodak Short Film Award ===
- Lacrimae rerum by Nicolas Nicolaides

== Media ==
- INA: Opening of the 1964 festival (commentary in French)
- INA: Arrivée des personnalités au Palais des festivals (commentary in French)
- INA: List of winners of the 1964 Cannes Festival (commentary in French)
