= Alaverdoba =

Religious and folk celebration

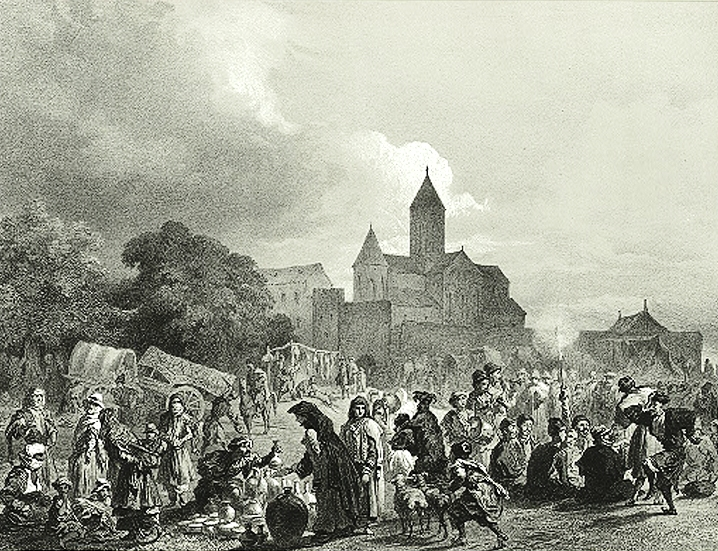
Festival at the Alaverdi Cathedral, by Grigory Gagarin, 1847

Alaverdoba (Georgian: ალავერდობა) is a religious and folk celebration in the eastern Georgian province of Kakheti, with its roots in a harvest festival. It focuses on Alaverdi Cathedral from which it derives its name, with the suffix –oba designating attribution. The festival lasts for several days, climaxing on 28 September, the feast day of St. Joseph of Alaverdi of the Thirteen Assyrian Fathers, the 6th-century founder of the cathedral.

Historically Alaverdoba lasted for three weeks in a three-step cycle, reflecting pre-Christian cults related to the Moon. In the 19th century, a tradition of agricultural fair was added to the festival. It has been a subject of several contemporary ethnological accounts and travelogues as well as the focus of Giorgi Shengelaya’s 1962 semi-documentary Alaverdoba.

Alaverdoba survived the Soviet era and is still widely celebrated in Kakheti, attended by locals as well as visitors from the neighboring communities such as the Kists from the Pankisi Gorge.
