= Mamuka Gongadze =

Deputy Chairman of the State Council of Heraldry at the Parliament of Georgia

Mamuka Gongadze (born 21 October 1963 in Tbilisi) is a Georgian heraldry specialist, architect, artist, author of the Georgian state coat of arms, and Deputy Chairman of the State Council of Heraldry at the Parliament of Georgia.

== Biography ==
Mamuka Gongadze (Georgian: მამუკა გონგაძე) was born on October 21, 1963, in Tbilisi, Georgia. He studied at Tbilisi 48th secondary school and graduated from the Tbilisi State Academy of Arts in 1988. He became a member of the Union of Georgian Designers in 1988. The same year 1988 he became a founder and head of the design studio "Oshki". In the period of 1989–1992 he was employed by "Tbilkalakproekti" Ltd and "Kurortpoekti" Ltd as an architect. Starting in 1993 he worked for The Ministry of Defense of Georgia, where, in 1995, he became a Chief of the Military Design Department. In 1995 he became a member of the Georgian State Heraldry Commission. In 1999 he became one of the founders and the Chairman of the Board of the NGO "Georgian Heraldry Association". In the period of 2005-2008 he was a member of the Georgian State Heraldry Commission at the President's office. In 2000 – he was a founder and a Chairman of the Board at the NGO "Studia Re". Starting from 2008 up to date - he is Deputy Chairman of the State Council of Heraldry at the Parliament of Georgia.

== List of Works ==
- 1992 File:1992 ბანკნოტის ესკიზები.jpg;File:სამხედრო ძალების მოსამსახურეების უნიფორმა.jpg;
- 1993;
- 1995 File:სასაზღვრო ძალების მოსამსახურეების უნიფორმა, ემბლემატიკა და სიმბოლიკა.jpg;
- 1997 File:სამხედრო დროშები.jpg;
- 1999 File:ოქროს საწმისის ორდენი, ესკიზები.jpg;
- 2000;
- 2001 File:სასაზღვრო ძალების დროშები.jpg;
- 2002;
- 2004 The Georgian State Coat of Arms (the initial version for the competition).File:საქართველოს სახელმწიფო გერბის კონკურსი 2004 - 1.jpg File:საქართველოს სახელმწიფო გერბის კონკურსი 2004 - 2.jpg File:საქართველოს სახელმწიფო გერბის კონკურსი 2004 - 3.jpg File:საქართველოს სახელმწიფო გერბის კონკურსი 2004 - 4.jpg File:საქართველოს სახელმწიფო გერბის კონკურსი 2004 - 5.jpg;
- 2005 File:სახელმწიფო გერბი - 1.jpgFile:სახელმწიფო გერბი - 2.jpg;
- 2005 File:„ წმინდა გიორგის გამარჯვების “ ორდენი 2005 St. George's Victory Order 2005.jpg; File:„ ეროვნული გმირის “ ორდენი 2005 Order “ National Hero” 2005.jpg;
- 2006 File:პატრულ-ინსპექტორების უნიფორმა.jpg;
- 2006-2009 File:მონეტა-2 ლარი, 50 თეთრი.jpgFile:ოქროს საწმისი.jpg File:ილორი, სვეტიცხოველი.jpg File:ვაჟა-ფშაველა, ქართული ვაზი, ჯვარი, ეროვნული ბანკი - პროექტი.jpg File:ბაქო-თბილისი-ჯეიჰანი, ლეხ კაჩინსკი, ცეკვა მთიულური.jpg;
- 2007- 2013;
- 1999-2009;
- 2012 File:უცხოეთში მცხოვრები თანამემამულის მოწმობა.jpg
