= Alaverdoba (film) =

1962 film

- Directed by: Giorgi Shengelaia
- Written by: Giorgi Shengelaia; Revaz Inanishvili; Guram Rcheulishvili
- Produced by: Shota Khojava
- Starring: Avto Varazi
- Cinematography: Aleksandre Rekhviashvili
- Music by: Peliks Glonti
- Release date: 1962
- Running time: 42 minutes
- Country: Soviet Union
- Languages: Georgian, Russian

Alaverdoba (Georgian: ალავერდობა, translit. alaverdoba, Russian: Алавердоба) is a 1962 Soviet Art drama film directed by Giorgi Shengelaia. The film story set in around Alaverdi Monastery, Kakheti. Protagonist Guram goes there in order to see firsthand the ancient Georgian religious feast Alaverdoba.

== Cast ==
- Geidar Palavandishvili as Gurami
- Kote Daushvili as Lezghin
- Irakli Kokrashvili as Salesman
- Leo Balisevich as Driver
- Nodar Piranishvili as Hairdresser
- Kote Toloraia as Qisti
