= Eldar Shengelaia =

Soviet-Georgian film director and politician (1933–2025)

- ელდარ შენგელაია
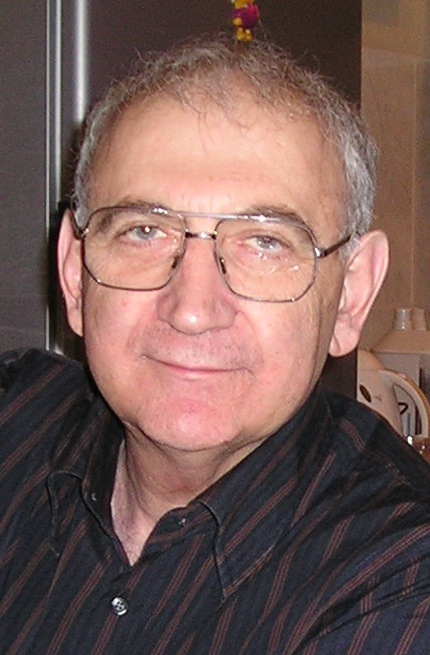
- Shengelaya in 2004

Member of the Parliament of Georgia
- In office 14 November 1990 – 22 April 2004

Personal details
- Born: 26 January 1933 Tbilisi, Georgian SSR, Transcaucasian SFSR, USSR (now Georgia)
- Died: August 2025 (aged 92)
- Occupation: Film director, screenwriter, theater pedagogue

Eldar Shengelaia (Georgian: ელდარ შენგელაია; 26 January 1933 – August 2025) was a Georgian film director and screenwriter who directed ten films between 1957 and 1996. From 1990 to 2004, he was a member of the Parliament of Georgia. He was awarded the title of the People's Artist of the USSR (1988). He was a chairman of the Film-makers' Union of Georgia from 1976. Beginning in 2008, he was chairman of the State Council of Heraldry at the Parliament of Georgia.

== Early life and film career ==
Eldar Shengelaia was born in Tbilisi, the capital of then-Soviet Georgia into the family of the film director Nikoloz Shengelaia and actress Nato Vachnadze. His brother, Giorgi Shengelaia was also a film director.

He graduated from the All-Union State Institute of Cinematography (VGIK) in Moscow in 1958 and then worked for the studio Mosfilm. In 1960, he became a director at the Tbilisi-based Georgian Film Studio. In 1969, Shengelaia gained nationwide acclaim with the satyrical tragicomedy Arachveulebrivi gamopena ("An Unusual Exhibition") socio-political allusions of which caused discontent in the official Soviet cinema establishment. Thereafter, Shengelaia retained a reputation of a highly individual filmmaker.

Shengelaia produced another high-profile tragicomedy about inept bureaucracy Tsisperi mtebi anu daujerebeli ambavi ("Blue Mountains, or Unbelievable Story"), one of the best achievements in the Soviet "social fiction" genre. It won the All-Union Film Festival Prize in 1984 and the USSR State Prize in 1985. After a major success in the 1980s, Eldar Shengelaia distanced himself from the cinema and became involved in the Georgian independence movement which gained a momentum in 1989. In the 1990s, Shengelaia briefly returned to the cinema and produced two films which were positively received by critics but did not attract a broader public attention.

In 1985 he was a member of the jury at the 14th Moscow International Film Festival. In 1992 he was a member of the jury at the 42nd Berlin International Film Festival.

== Political career ==
From 1980 to 1985 and from 1989 to 1990, Shengelaia, then a Communist party member, was elected to the Georgian SSR Supreme Soviet and, from 1989 to 1991, to the Congress of the People’s Deputies of the USSR. He was a member of the Sobchak commission, investigating into the Soviet military crackdown on pro-independence rally in Tbilisi, for which he produced a resonant documentary film. In July 1989, Shengelaia became a founding member of the People’s Front of Georgia, a pro-independence party, and emerged as a leader of its moderate wing. In October 1990, he was elected to the Supreme Council of Georgia in the first multi-party elections in Soviet Georgia and was a signatory to the Act of Independence of Georgia in April 1991. Afterwards, he was in opposition to the Zviad Gamsakhurdia government following whose overthrow in a military coup in January 1992, Shengelaia joined the Eduard Shevardnadze-led State Council of Georgia. In 1992, he became a member of parliament where he held a post of vice-speaker since 1995. He allied, in May 1993, with the pro-Shevardnadze civil movement Unity and Prosperity founded by several high-profile intellectuals.

In 1994, Shengelaia became a founding member of the Union of Citizens of Georgia chaired by Shevardnadze and joined its "reformist" faction led by Zurab Zhvania whom he joined in opposition to Shevardnadze in 2002. In response, Shevradnadze’s loyal members of parliament tried, unsuccessfully, to have Shengelaia removed from the vice-speaker’s position in May 2002. In 2003, he supported the Rose Revolution which ousted Shevardnadze and was reelected to the Parliament of Georgia in 2004 on the National Movement-Democrats alliance ticket. Later that year, he retired from active politics. In 2008, he was appointed a chairman of the State Council of Heraldry.

On 12 April 2009, Shengelaia was awarded St. George's Order of Victory, one of the highest civic awards of Georgia, for "having participating in the investigation of and having shown to the world the truth" about 9 April 1989 events in Tbilisi.

== Personal life and death ==
His first wife was actress Ariadna Shengelaya, with whom he had two daughters, Nato (born 1958) and Katya (born 1967).

His second wife was Nelli Shengelaia, with whom he had one daughter, Yelena, who died in a car accident in 2006.

Eldar Shengelaia died in August 2025, at the age of 92.

== Filmography ==
- Well (2020)
- A Chair (2016)
- Dog Rose (1996)
- Express Information (1993)
- Blue Mountains (1983)
- Samanishvili's Stepmother (1977)
- The Eccentrics (1973)
- Unusual Exhibition (1968)
- Miqela (1965)
- The White Caravan (1963; co-directed with Tamaz Meliava)
- A Snow Fairy Tale (1959; co-directed with Aleksei Sakharov)
- Legend of the Ice Heart (1957)
