= Erlom Akhvlediani =

Georgian writer

- ერლომ ახვლედიანი
- Born: November 23, 1933; Tbilisi, Georgian SSR, USSR
- Died: March 20, 2012 (aged 78); Moscow, Russia
- Education: Tbilisi State University
- Occupations: novelist, scriptwriter
- Writing career
- Notable awards: USSR State Prize; Saba prize

Erlom Akhvlediani (Georgian: ერლომ ახვლედიანი; 23 November 1933 – 20 March 2012) was a Georgian novelist and scriptwriter.

Akhvlediani was born in Tbilisi and graduated from Tbilisi State University in 1957, majoring in history. He took higher education courses at the All-Union State Institute of Cinematography in Moscow from 1962 to 1964. From 1962 to 1999, he wrote scripts for 18 films and starred in four movies. He authored three novels and several short stories, some of which have been translated in Russian, Armenian, Czech, German, Hungarian, and Arabic. Among many accolades Erlom Akhvlediani won were the USSR State Prize (1980) and the Georgian Literary Award SABA (2010).

== Works ==
- Vano and Niko (1950s)
- Aprili (1961)
- Pirosmani (1969)
- The Journey of a Young Composer (1985)
