= The Journey of a Young Composer =

1986 film

- Film poster
- Directed by: Giorgi Shengelaya
- Written by: Giorgi Shengelaya; Erlom Akhvlediani; Otar Chkeidze (novel)
- Starring: Gia Peradze; Levan Abashidze
- Cinematography: Levan Paatashvili
- Release date: 1985
- Running time: 105 minutes
- Country: Soviet Union
- Languages: Georgian, Russian

The Journey of a Young Composer (Georgian: ახალგაზრდა კომპოზიტორის მოგზაურობა, translit. Akhalgazrda kompozitoris mogzauroba, Russian: Путешествие молодого композитора) is a 1985 Soviet comedy drama film directed by Giorgi Shengelaya. It was entered into the 36th Berlin International Film Festival where Shengelaya won the Silver Bear for Best Director.

== Plot ==
The film is set in 1907. The film's protagonist, composer Nikusha (Levan Abashidze), travels to Georgian villages to collect folk songs. His companion is accidentally becomes Tatasheli Leko (Gia Peradze), who mistakes Nikusha for a revolutionary conspirator, and his map illustrating the villages for an insurrection plan.

== Cast ==
- Gia Peradze as Leko Tatasheli
- Levan Abashidze as Nikusha Chachanidze
- Zura Kipshidze as Elizbar Tsereteli
- Rusudan Kvlividze as Tekla Tsereteli
- Ruslan Miqaberidze as Shalva Tsereteli
- Lili Ioseliani as Epemia Tsereteli
- Teimuraz Dzhaparidze as Giorgi Otskheli
- Ketevan Orakhelashvili as Gurandukhti
- Zinaida Kverenchkhiladze as Gulkani
- Chabua Amiredjibi as Davit Itrieli
- Teimuraz Bichiashvili as Rostomi
