= Levan Abashidze =

Georgian actor (1963–1992)

- Born: Levan Abashidze; 22 May 1963; Tbilisi, Georgian SSR, USSR
- Died: 7 September 1992 (aged 29); Sukhumi, Georgia
- Education: Theatre and Film university

Levan Abashidze (Georgian: ლევან აბაშიძე, pronounced [ˈlevan ˈabaʃidze]; 22 May 1963, Tbilisi - 7 September 1992, Sukhumi) was a Georgian actor. In 1985 Levan graduated from Shota Rustaveli Institute of theater and performing arts in Tbilisi. The following year, Levan played a leading role in various Georgian films such as "Steps" (1986), "The Journey of a Young Composer" (1986), "Guest" (1987), and "Roots" (ფესვები) in 1987. His last film ("Bravo, Djordano, Bravo) was in 1993 before he volunteered to fight in the armed conflict in Abkhazia (Georgia). During the separatist offensive on Sukhumi in 1993, Levan Abashidze was killed defending Gumista River entrenchment of the Georgian forces. His death caused a serious outcry in the film and theater studios all across Georgia.
