= April (1961 film) =

1961 film

- Directed by: Otar Iosseliani
- Written by: Otar Iosseliani; Erlom Akhvlediani
- Produced by: J. Sharikadze
- Starring: Tatyana Chanturia; Gia Chiraqadze; Akaki Chikvaidze
- Cinematography: Yuri Fednev
- Music by: Sulkhan Tsintsadze
- Production company: Kartuli Pilmi
- Release date: 1961
- Running time: 46 minutes
- Country: Soviet Union
- Language: Georgian

April (Georgian: აპრილი, romanized: ap'rili; Russian: Апрель, romanized: Aprel) is a short romance-drama film written and directed by Otar Iosseliani. The film was produced in 1961 in Iosseliani's early period while still in his native Georgia.

The film was screened out of competition at the 2000 Cannes Film Festival.

== Cast ==
- Tatyana Chanturia as Mtsiya
- Gia Chiraqadze as Vadzha
- Akaki Chikvaidze as neighbor
