= Dodo Abashidze =

Georgian actor

Dodo Abashidze დავით [დოდო] აბაშიძე
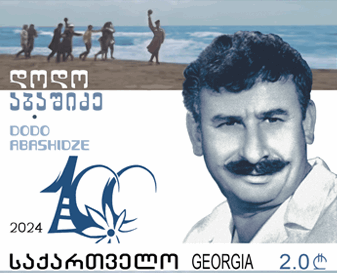
- Abashidze on a 2024 stamp of Georgia
- Born: 1 May 1924; Tbilisi, Georgian SSR, Soviet Union
- Died: 26 January 1990 (aged 65); Tbilisi, Georgian SSR, Soviet Union
- Education: Theatre and Film university
- Occupations: Actor and film director
- Years active: 1954–1988
- Awards: People's Artist of the Georgian SSR (1967)

David 'Dodo' Abashidze (Georgian: დავით [დოდო] აბაშიძე; Russian: Дави́д Ива́нович Абаши́дзе; 1 May 1924 – 26 January 1990) was a Soviet Georgian actor and film director. He was named People’s Artist of Georgia in 1967. After his death a Tbilisi street was named in his honor. He appeared in 50 films between 1954 and 1988.

Abashidze studied at the Shota Rustaveli Theater Institute in Tbilisi, graduating in 1949. He then joined the troupe of the Rustaveli Theater but after a few years dedicated himself fully to cinema. Abashidze’s film debut was the role of Bichiko in Siko Dolidze’s comedy The Dragonfly (1954, from Nikoloz Baratashvili’s Marine), which became a box-office hit throughout the USSR. Over the following three decades, the actor worked with all leading directors of Georgian cinema and worked in a variety of genres ranging from historical adventure to contemporary drama and musical comedy. Tengiz Abuladze and Revaz Chkheidze cast him in their successful joint debut Magdana’s Donkey (1955), Otar Ioseliani in Falling Leaves (1966), Eldar Shengelaia in Unusual Exhibition (1968), and Georgi Danelia in Don't Grieve (1969). Another notable role was of the shepherd Sosana who resists urban modernization in The Grand Green Valley (1968).

One of Abashidze's greatest achievements was the co-direction of two pictures with Sergei Paradjanov: The Legend of Suram Fortress (1984) and Ashik Kerib (1988), where he also acted as well.

== Filmography ==
As an Actor

- The Dragonfly (1954)
- Magdana's Donkey (1956)
- Bashi-Achuki (1956)
- Eteris simgera (1957)
- Me vitkvi simartles (1957)
- Ori odjakhi (1958)
- Tetri gameebi (TV Movie) (1958)
- Chiakokona (1961)
- Udiplomo sasidzo (1961)
- Burti da moedani (Short) (1961)
- Mission (1961) as
- The White Caravan (1963)
- Zgvis shvilebi (1964)
- Khevsuruli balada (1966)
- Falling Leaves (1966)
- Male gazapkhuli mova (1967)
- Great Green Valley (1967)
- Unusual Exhibition (1968)
- Tariel Golua (1968)
- Don't Grieve (1969)
- Pirosmani (1969)
- Didostatis Marjvena (pirveli seria) (1969)
- Sinatle chvens panjrebshi (1969)
- Melodies of Vera Quarter (1973)
- Ar Daijero, Rom agar var (1975)
- Sakme gadaetsema sasamartlos (TV Movie) (1976)
- Ramdenime interviu pirad sakitkhebze (1976)
- Mtsvervali (1976)
- Namdvili tbiliselebi da skhvebi (1976)
- Data Tutashkhia (TV Series) (1977)
- Racha, chemi sikvaruli (1977)
- Qalaqi Anara (1978)
- Kvarkvare (1978)
- Fedia (Short) (1978)
- Qortsineba imerulad (TV Movie) (1978)
- Pokhishcheniye veka (1981)
- Matsivarshi vigats ijda (1983)
- Tsigni pitsisa (1983)
- The Legend of Suram Fortress (1985)
- Pesvebi (1987)
- Ashik Kerib (1987)

As director

- The Legend of Suram Fortress (1985) co-director
- Ashik Kerib (1988) co-director
