= Georgian heraldry =

Coat of arms of Georgia

Georgian heraldry was largely suppressed during the Soviet era, but after Georgia's independence, it has been revived. It draws inspiration from Asian and Western European heraldic traditions as well as its own.

Since 2008, Georgia has the State Council of Heraldry under the national parliament.

== History ==
One of the earliest pieces of heraldry known to be associated with Georgia was designed in the 15th century for the Kingdom of Georgia. Conrad Grünenberg, in his armorial, described several Georgian arms, including those for West Georgia and Abkhazia.

The coat of arms of the Bagrationi dynasty was considered to be a state coat of arms of Georgia. The designs ran with the image of David, from whom the Bagrationis claimed lineage.

Heraldry in Georgia was further developed by Prince Vakhushti of Kartli. In his “Atlas of Georgia”, a geographical work on the Caucasus, he used several early coats of arms for Georgia. Historians today use it not just as a geographical work but also as an armorial due to its significant heraldic content. He used various existing symbols of Georgia, such as Saint George, but this was the first time Archangel Michael had been used as a symbol of Georgia.

In the eighteenth century, the court of Heraclius II, king of Kakheti, and later Qartli and Kakheti. He had a great interest in westernising Georgia, which included introduction of flags and coats of arms of family and country. He used the great royal seal to ratify the Treaty of Georgievsk with the Russian Empire in 1783, which made early use of the Georgian crown as a symbol. Erekle II's older seal, from 1746, was at the time original, though now it contributes greatly towards the flag and coat of arms. It indeed has two lion supporters with a shield, and a Goergian crown atop it. It also has a cross, accompanied by four roundels, known as the Jerusalem cross. It was adopted due to Georgia's adherence to Eastern Orthodox Christianity. Modern Georgia adopted this as a flag based on the significant historical precedent as its use as a banner for Georgia.

Today, the Royal Heraldic college of Georgia is "entrusted with issuing, registering, and regulating armorial bearings and other heraldic matters."

== Examples ==
=== Coat of arms ===
Georgian law describes the coat of arms as follows:

The State coat of arms of Georgia is an heraldic shield, on its pupure field is depicted a silver rider on a silver horse and with a silver spear ending with a golden cross, Saint George with a golden halo, striking a silver dragon. The shield is crowned with the Iverian (Georgian) crown. The supporters are two golden lions, standing on a compartment of stylized grape vine ornament. The compartment is embellished with a silver-purple motto ribbon (face is silver, back is purple). On the silver field of the ribbon with black Mkhedruli letters is written the motto "ძალა ერთობაშია" ("Strength is in unity"). On the ribbon, in the beginning and the end of the inscription, are depicted purpure heraldic crosses.

=== Flag ===
Flag of Georgia

The national flag of Georgia, as described in a decree:

The Georgian national flag is a white rectangle, with a large red cross in its central portion touching all four sides of the flag. In the four corners there are four bolnur-katskhuri crosses (also referred to as a Georgian Cross or a Grapevine cross) of the same color as the large cross.

The current flag was used by the Georgian patriotic movement following the country's independence from the Soviet Union in 1991. By the late 1990s, the design had become widely known as the Georgian historical national flag, as vexillologists had pointed out the red-on-white Jerusalem cross shown as the flag of Tbilisi in a 14th-century map by Domenico and Francesco Pizzigano.
