= Mission (1961 film) =

- Russian: Командировка
- Directed by: Yuri Yegorov
- Written by: Nikolai Figurovsky; Yuri Yegorov
- Starring: Oleg Efremov; Dodo Abashidze; Svetlana Karpinskaya; Valeri Malyshev; Gennadi Frolov; Olga Lysenko; Aleksey Mironov
- Cinematography: Igor Shatrov
- Edited by: Galina Shatrova
- Music by: Mark Fradkin
- Production company: Gorky Film Studio
- Release date: 1961
- Running time: 91 minutes
- Country: Soviet Union
- Language: Russian

Mission (Russian: Командировка) is a 1961 Soviet drama film directed by Yuri Yegorov.

== Plot ==
The film tells about the engineer-designer of agricultural machinery, who suddenly finds out that the tractor that he invented does not work in one village, and he goes to help the collective farmers. Circumstances force him to stay there much longer than he expected.

== Cast ==
- Oleg Efremov
- Dodo Abashidze
- Svetlana Karpinskaya
- Valeri Malyshev
- Gennadi Frolov
- Olga Lysenko
- Aleksey Mironov
- Ivan Lapikov
- Mariya Andrianova
- Yevgeny Vesnik
- Emmanuil Geller
