= The White Caravan =

1963 film

- Film poster
- Directed by: Tamaz Meliava; Eldar Shengelaya
- Written by: Merab Eliozishvili
- Produced by: V. Khutsishvili
- Starring: Imedo Kakhiani
- Cinematography: Leonid Kalashnikov; Giorgi Kalatozishvili
- Edited by: N. Saradova
- Music by: Irakli Gejadze
- Distributed by: Gruziya-film
- Release date: 1963
- Running time: 93 minutes
- Country: Soviet Union
- Languages: Georgian; Russian

The White Caravan (Georgian: თეთრი ქარავანი; Russian: Белый караван, romanized: Belyy karavan) is a 1963 Soviet black-and-white romantic drama film directed by Tamaz Meliava and Eldar Shengelaya. It was entered into the 1964 Cannes Film Festival. In April 2019, a restored version of the film was selected to be shown in the Cannes Classics section at the 2019 Cannes Film Festival.

== Plot ==
Each autumn, a white caravan travels from Georgia to the Caspian lowlands, herding sheep across the vast steppe. Among the shepherds is Gela, the son of the oldest shepherd, Martia Akhlouri. On the shores of the Caspian Sea, Gela meets Maria, a fisherman, and the two fall in love, dreaming of future reunions.

Maria imagines a life where she and Gela live in her late father's house, raise children, and find happiness as a family. However, Gela dreams of a peaceful urban life, weary of the constant wandering. His vision of a settled city life remains steadfast, and not even Maria can take that dream away from him.

== Cast ==
- Imedo Kakhiani as Gela
- Ariadna Shengelaya as Maria
- Giorgi Kikadze as Vajia
- Spartak Bagashvili as Martia
- N. Kalapidini as Petro
- Merab Eliozishvili as Balta
- Kote Toloraya as Siata
- Dodo Abashidze as driver Yagvira
- Gogutsa Kuprashvili as Kivana
- I. Taralashvili as Sero
- Valentin Donguzashvili as Glakho
