= The Eccentrics =

- Film poster
- Directed by: Eldar Shengelaia
- Written by: Revaz Gabriadze
- Starring: Vasili Chkhaidze, Demno Jgenti, Ariadna Shengelaia
- Music by: Giya Kancheli
- Distributed by: Gruziya-film
- Release date: 1974
- Running time: 80 minutes
- Country: Soviet Union
- Languages: Georgian, Russian

The Eccentrics (Georgian: შერეკილები, Sherekilebi; Russian: Чудаки, Chudaki) is a 1974 Soviet satire-comedy film directed by Eldar Shengelaia.

== Plot ==
Ertaoz Bregvadze goes to the city intending to sell a chicken and pay off his father's debts. Upon arrival, he falls instantly in love with a beautiful woman named Margalita and decides to help her dispose of the body of her lover, a policeman. At the cemetery, the policeman unexpectedly regains consciousness and arrests Ertaoz along with the chicken. Ertaoz is sentenced to ten years in prison, while the bird receives seven. In prison, they meet Khristofor, an inventor who has created a flying machine that runs on the power of love instead of fuel.

== Cast ==
- Vasili Chkhaidze as Qristepore
- Demno Jgenti as Ertaozi
- Ariadna Shengelaia as Margalita
- Boris Tsipuria as Khuta, a policeman
- Abrek Pkhaladze as Noshrevani
- Merab Eliozishvili as Triponi
- Akaki Bakradze as Mizana
- Grigol Tkabladze as Priest
