= Greed in the Sun =

1964 film

- French film poster for Greed in the Sun
- Directed by: Henri Verneuil
- Written by: Michel Audiard
- Screenplay by: Marcel Jullian
- Based on: Original story by Claude Veillot
- Produced by: Alain Poiré; Irenee Leriche; Robert Sussfeld
- Starring: Jean-Paul Belmondo; Lino Ventura; Reginald Kernan
- Cinematography: Marcel Grignon
- Edited by: Claude Durand
- Music by: Georges Delerue
- Production companies: Gaumont; Ultra Film; Trianon Movies
- Distributed by: Gaumont Distribution
- Release date: 1964 (France)
- Running time: 122 minutes
- Countries: France; Italy
- Language: French
- Box office: 3.4 million admissions (France)

Greed in the Sun (French: Cent mille dollars au soleil) is a 1964 French-Italian adventure film directed by Henri Verneuil. The film was entered into the 1964 Cannes Film Festival.

== Plot ==
The forwarder Castigliano instructs Steiner to drive a new truck with a payload through the Sahara Desert. Steiner is new to the operation and is viewed with suspicion by the other employees. In the evening Steiner goes out with Rocco, Marec and some colleagues. The next morning the truck is gone. Castigliano is furious and orders Marec to retrieve the truck which was stolen by Rocco. Rocco with his girlfriend Pepa head towards the border. A wild chase begins through the deserts and impassable areas.

Marec travels with Steiner. When crossing a state it turns out that Steiner is actually called Frocht; he was the leader of a band of mercenaries in a coup d'état. Rocco succeeds in shaking off Marec several times. Mitch has to repeatedly come to the aide of Marec. After Rocco’s truck breaks down, he sets a trap for Marec and Steiner. Rocco forces Marec at gunpoint to exchange his roadworthy truck with the defective truck. Steiner tries to fight back and receives a gunshot through his leg. Rocco leaves Marec and Steiner stranded in the desert. Rocco tries to sell the cargo for $100,000 to a fence.

Marec and Steiner finally make it to the next town, where Marec abandons Steiner after expressing his disgust for the man and happens across Rocco in a brothel. A wild brawl erupts between the two, and when they are both too weak to beat each other up further, Rocco admits that he showed up to the rendezvous with the fence but the fence was not there. When he came back to the hotel, he discovered that Pepa had made off with the truck and the payload.

== Cast ==
- Jean-Paul Belmondo as Rocco
- Lino Ventura as Hervé Marec
- Reginald Kernan as John Steiner (alias Peter Frocht)
- Bernard Blier as Mitch-Mitch
- Andréa Parisy as Pepa
- Gert Fröbe as Castigliano
- Anne-Marie Coffinet as Angèle
- Doudou Babet as Khenouche
- Pierre Mirat as Halibi
- Henri Lambert as Robert, a guest at "Chez Zeze"
- Pierre Collet as one of Castigliano's workers
- Christian Brocard
- Paul Bonifas

== Production ==
Director Henry Verneuil said the film was "a Western, but since in France we don't have horses, I use trucks. I give Jean Paul the hat, blue jeans, boots of a cowboy. He's one of the few young actors in France who is young and manly."

== Reception ==
=== Box office ===
The film was a box office hit in France. It was the seventh most popular film of the year at the French box office.

=== Critical ===
New York Times film critic Howard Thompson gave mixed review of the film, stating that "Some interesting ingredients hover in mid-air throughout this overlong film, which lacks real cohesion or impact".

=== Awards ===
The film was nominated for the Palme d'Or at the 1964 Cannes Film Festival.
