= Unusual Exhibition =

Extraordinary Exhibition
- Film poster
- Directed by: Eldar Shengelaya
- Written by: Revaz Gabriadze
- Starring: Guram Lordkipanidze, Valentina Telechkina and Vasil Chkhaidze
- Music by: Giya Kancheli
- Distributed by: Gruziya-film
- Release date: 1968
- Running time: 94 minutes
- Country: Soviet Union
- Languages: Georgian, Russian

Extraordinary Exhibition (Georgian: არაჩვეულებრივი გამოფენა, Russian: Необыкновенная выставка) is a 1968 Soviet black-and-white war drama film directed by Eldar Shengelaya.

To support his family, the sculptor undertook the production of gravestones. Then he was drawn in, he got married, and carried away by everyday life, the betrayed his dreams. He realised this one day, when he was in a cemetery, surrounded by his own works. This explains the title: the only exhibition he had is made of tomb stones.

== Plot ==
The film, presented as a parable, tells the story of sculptor Aguli Eristavi, who returns from the war disabled by an injury. While still at the front, Aguli dreams of carving a statue called Spring from a block of Parian marble in his yard—a slender youth with hands raised to the sky and eyes gazing into the distance.

However, following his father’s advice, Aguli begins crafting gravestones to meet the high demand in the war-torn village. Many neighbors request a monument from the beautiful marble block, but Aguli deflects their requests with various excuses.

Along the way, he meets Glafira Ogurtsova, a police officer who arrests him for violating curfew. Their relationship evolves as she becomes his muse, then his wife, and later the mother of his children. He also takes on a young apprentice, Zaur.

Initially inspired by ancient Greek sculpture, Aguli attempts to create art with deeper meaning, but his clients value only likeness over artistry. Over time, he resigns himself to being a craftsman rather than an artist. In a poignant final monologue at the cemetery, which he mockingly calls his “personal exhibition,” Aguli reflects on his unfulfilled dreams, symbolically burying his creative ambitions.

In the end, Aguli gives the marble block to Zaur, his hopeful young apprentice, seeing in him the potential for a future he once envisioned for himself.

== Cast ==
- Guram Lortkipanidze as Aguli
- Valentina Telichkina as Glafira Ogurtsova
- Vasili Chkhaidze as Pipinia
- Dodo Abashidze as Shavlegi
- Salome Kancheli as Widow
- Julieta Vashakmadze as Tina
- Victor Deisadze as Bonaventuri
- Akaki Doborjginidze as Dimitri
- Aleksandre Kelbalkiani as Pestvianidze
- Nikoloz Miqashavidze as Khurtsidze
- Jaba Tsuladze as Akimi
- Shota Gabelaia as Jincharadze
