= Great Green Valley =

- Directed by: Merab Kokochashvili
- Written by: Giorgi Shengelaia; Merab Eliozishvili
- Produced by: V. Jikia
- Starring: Dodo Abashidze
- Cinematography: Giorgi Gersamia
- Edited by: Dj. Cheishvili
- Music by: Nodar Mamisashvili
- Production company: Qartuli Pilmi
- Release date: 1967
- Running time: 92 minutes
- Country: Soviet Union
- Languages: Russian, Georgian

Great Green Valley (Georgian: დიდი მწვანე ველი, translit. Didi mtsvane veli, Russian: Большая зелёная долина) is a 1967 Soviet art-drama film directed by Merab Kokochashvili, written by Merab Eliozishvili.

== Cast ==
- Dodo Abashidze as Sosana
- Lia Kapanadze as Pirimze
- Mzia Maglakelidze as Sopio
- Ilia Bakakuri a sGiorgi
- Z. Tseradze as Iotami
- Guram Gegeshidze as Geologist
- Grigol Tkabladze as Farm manager
