= Guram Rcheulishvili =

Georgian writer

Guram Rcheulishvili გურამ რჩეულიშვილი
- Born: July 4, 1934; Tbilisi, Georgia
- Died: August 23, 1960 (aged 26); Gagra, Georgia
- Resting place: Vake Cemetery, Tbilisi
- Education: Tbilisi State University, Historical faculty
- Occupation: Writer
- Writing career
- Language: Georgian language
- Period: 1957-1960

Guram Rcheulishvili (Georgian: გურამ რჩეულიშვილი; July 4, 1934, in Tbilisi, Georgia ― August 23, 1960, in Gagra, Georgia) was a Georgian writer.

== Biography ==
Guram Rcheulishvili was born on July 4, 1934, in Tbilisi. In 1957 he graduated from the historical faculty at Tbilisi State University. His first stories, which were printed in the newspaper Tsiskari in 1957, brought him great success. During his life, only some of his works were published. His collected works, Salamura, were published after his death, in 1961. Rcheulishvili's prose attracted readers by its style, dialogues, and ideas. His works remain popular. Guram Rcheulishvili's works have been translated into German, Hungarian, Bulgarian, Lithuanian, Czech, and Russian. He died in Gagra on August 23, 1960, at age 26 while saving an unknown Russian girl in a rough sea. He is buried in Tbilisi, at Vake Cemetery.

== Bibliography ==
- Salamura, a collection of short stories (1961)
- Short Stories (1995)
- Iulon Tragedy I, a dramatic novel, December 1958 (1994)
- Shasha’s Revolution or Revolution in Ortachala on Cotton Row
- Book in Six Volumes (2002–2008)
- Slow Tango, short stories (2005)
