= Pirosmani (film) =

- Directed by: Giorgi Shengelaia
- Written by: Giorgi Shengelaia; Erlom Akhvlediani
- Starring: Avto Varazi
- Cinematography: Levan Paatashvili
- Music by: Nodar Gabunia
- Release date: 1969
- Running time: 81 minutes
- Country: Soviet Union
- Languages: Russian, Georgian, French

Pirosmani (Georgian: ფიროსმანი, translit. Pirosmani, Russian: Пиросмани) is a 1969 Soviet biographical art-drama film directed by Giorgi Shengelaia, about Georgian primitivist painter Niko Pirosmani.

== Cast ==
- Avto Varazi as Niko Pirosmani
- Zurab Kapianidze
- Dodo Abashidze
- Spartak Bagashvili
- Kote Daushvili
- Boris Tsipuria
- Givi Aleksandria

== Prizes and awards ==
- 1973 : Sutherland Trophy at BFI London Film Festival
- 1974 : Grand Prize: Gold Hugo at Chicago International Film Festival
- 1974 : Prize for Best Biographical film at Asolo Art Film Festival
