= State Council of Heraldry =

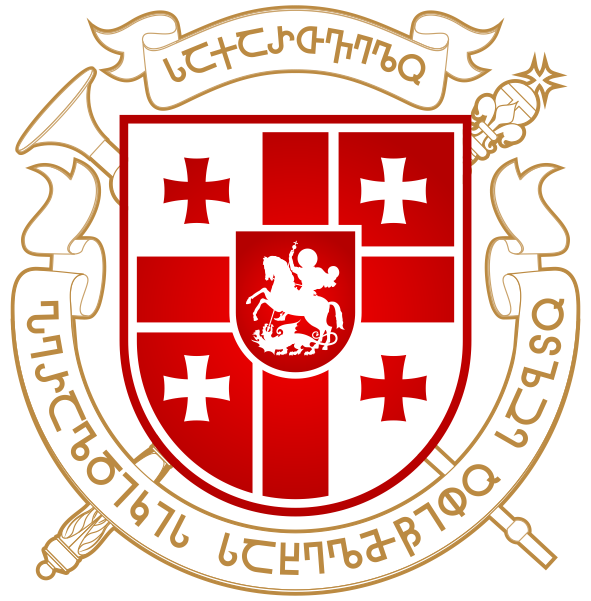
Logo of the State Council of Heraldry at the Parliament of Georgia

Flag of the State Council of Heraldry at the Parliament of Georgia.

The State Council of Heraldry at the Parliament of Georgia (Georgian: საქართველოს პარლამენტთან არსებული ჰერალდიკის სახელმწიფო საბჭო,sakartvelos parlamentan arsebuli heraldikis sakhelmtsipo sabcho) is a heraldic authority in Georgia, established at the Parliament of Georgia on February 29, 2008. Located in Tbilisi, the council advises the government of Georgia on all matters related to heraldry. The council is headed by a chairman who is appointed (and dismissed) by the chairperson of the Parliament of Georgia. Since its creation in 2008, the council has been chaired by Eldar Shengelaya. Mamuka Gongadze is deputy chairman of the State Council of Heraldry at the Parliament of Georgia.

== History of establishment of State Council of Heraldry at the Parliament of Georgia ==
After the passing of the Act of Restoration of State Independence of Georgia in April 1991, the necessity appeared to prepare heraldry and vexillology issues and to establish the relevant survey service. On the basis of the resolution of December 16, 1993, the "Working Group on Proposals for State Symbols of Georgia" was established at the Parliament of Georgia. The aim of the group was to prepare the proposals on issues of alteration of the state symbols.

On February 7, 1994, the "Working Group on Preparation of State Symbols of the Republic of Georgia" was established at the government of the Republic of Georgia. The aim of this group was to submit own considerations and projects on elaboration of the new constitution to the State Constitutional Commission. (The high officials of all ministries and instances were involved in the above-mentioned group on the social basis). Thus, on August 19, 1994, the personal composition of the Commission on Martial Flag and Honor Awards of the Armed Forces of the Republic of Georgia was established and their action plan was ratified. The commission was chaired by the prime minister of the country.

On January 17, 1996, the deputy-chairman of the "Working Group on State Symbols of Georgia", Eldar Shengelaia, in his speech at the Parliament of Georgia, raised the question of establishment of the Standing State Heraldry Board at the president of Georgia.

On August 12, 1996, the president issued the decree "On Establishment of the State Commission on Symbols of Georgia". The commission, chaired by the president of the country, was assigned to prepare and announce the contests on creation of the new state symbols, to provide public consideration and exposition of the contest material, to create the contest juries etc. The commission was also assigned to prepare the issue for provision of United States policy in the sphere of heraldry, also to establish the standing State Heraldry Board in view of definition, usage and protection of the legal status of state symbols.

In 1997, in view of elaboration of the state symbols of Georgia and provision of United States policy in the sphere of heraldry, the Infrastructure Group was established at the Parliament, which was assigned to jointly work with Commission on Symbols on state attributes.

On August 12, 1996, the specialists of the Commission on State Symbols of Georgia established the NGO "Georgian Heraldry Society", working on symbol issues.

On the basis of the decree of the president of March 2, 2004, the "Temporary Commission on State Attributes and Proposals" was established, which provided holding of the contest on the state coat of arms.

On August 14, 2004, in view to provide the unite state policy in the sphere of heraldry, to define the legal status of state symbols, to use and protect thereof, the Heraldry Commission at the president of Georgia was established in accordance with Decree of the President No. 333, on the basis of which, with the resolution of the Parliament of Georgia of February 29, 2008 (№ 5778-IR), the State Heraldry Council at the Parliament of Georgia was established. The council is the standing authority, facilitating conduct of unite state policy on heraldry issues in the country.

== The primary tasks and objectives of the State Heraldry Council ==
The primary tasks of the State Heraldry Council are as follows:

a) elaboration of the proposals on state symbols;

b) elaboration of the proposals on usage of state symbols;

c) participation in creation of the symbols of Abkhazia and Ajara Autonomous Republics and Self-governance Units and definition of usage rules thereof, also elaboration of corresponding recommendations;

d) elaboration of the proposals on creation and usage of the state symbols and the differential signs;

e) heraldic expert examination of the state symbols and the differential signs and preparation of the corresponding conclusions on creation and usage thereof;

f) consideration of the draft normative acts on inculcation of the new state symbols and differential signs and preparation of the corresponding conclusion;

g) issue of heraldic material within the scope of own competence;

h) promotion of state symbols and significance thereof in the country;

i) improvement and support of the official site of the State Heraldry Council;

j) solution of other issues, related to regulation of state symbols;

k) implementation of other tasks, imposed under the legislation of Georgia and the hereby provisions.

== Exhibition ==
- Exhibition of Georgian Contemporary State Symbols in Oni
- Exhibition of Georgian Contemporary State Symbols in Tsageri and Ambrolauri
- Exhibition in Samtshkhe-Javakheti
- Exhibition held in Dmanisi and Bolnisi
- Exhibition of State Symbols and Conference in Batumi
- Exhibition of state symbols in the framework of Diaspora Days in Georgia
- Exhibition in Duisi village
- Exhibition in Dusheti
- Day of the State Flag of Georgia
- Exhibition in Kvareli
