= Niko Pirosmani =

Georgian painter (1862–1918)

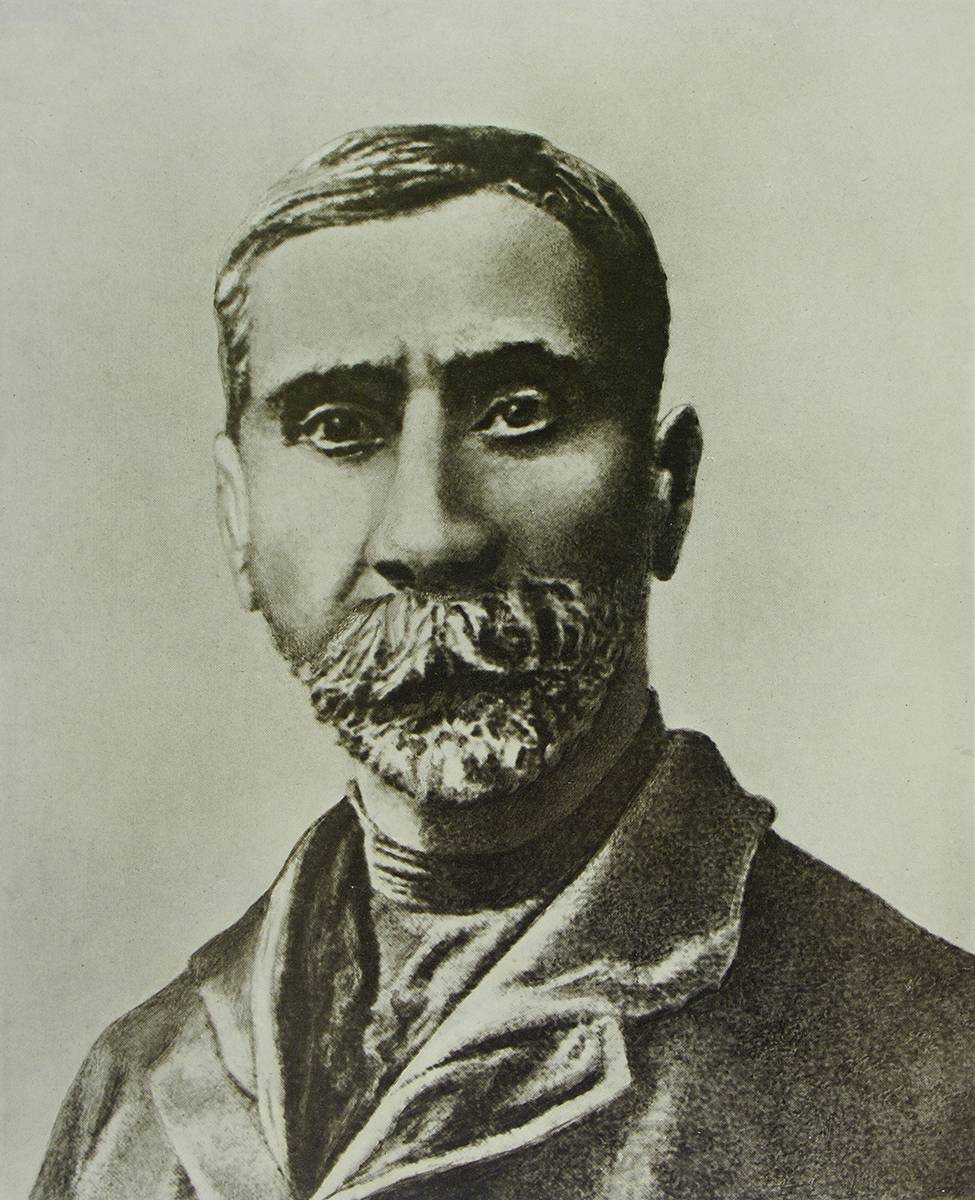
- Pirosmani, 1916
- Born: Nikoloz Aslanis Dze Pirosmanashvili; 5 May 1862; Mirzaani, Tiflis Governorate, Russian Empire
- Died: 9 April 1918 (aged 55); Tbilisi, Transcaucasian Democratic Federative Republic
- Education: Self-taught
- Known for: Painting
- Movement: Naïve art

Nikoloz Pirosmanashvili (Georgian: ნიკოლოზ ფიროსმანაშვილი; 1862–1918) or Niko Pirosmani (Georgian: ნიკო ფიროსმანი), simply referred to as Nikala (Georgian: ნიკალა), was a Georgian painter who posthumously rose to prominence. Relatively poor for most of his life, he worked a variety of ordinary jobs. His rustic, everyday scenes are celebrated today for their depiction of the Georgia of Pirosmani's lifetime, and he has become one of the country's most beloved artistic figures.

== Biography ==
Pirosmani was born in the Georgian village of Mirzaani to a peasant family in modern-day Kakheti province. His parents, Aslan Pirosmanashvili and Tekle Toklikishvili, were farmers, who owned a small vineyard, with a few cows and oxen. He was later orphaned and left in the care of his two elder sisters, Mariam and Pepe. He moved with them to Tbilisi in 1870. In 1872, while living in a little apartment not far from Tbilisi railway station, he worked as a servant to wealthy families and learned to read and write Russian and Georgian. In 1876, he returned to Mirzaani and worked as a herdsman.

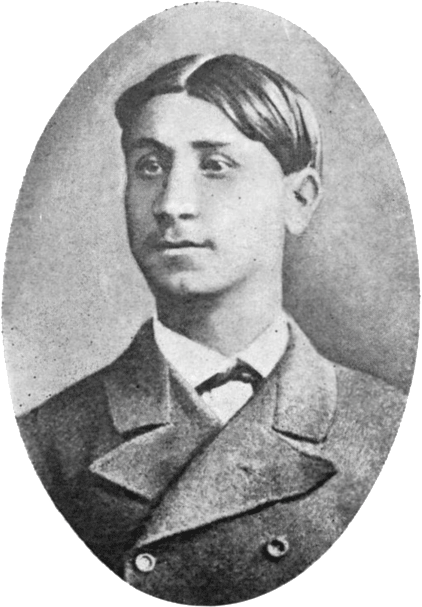
Pirosmani c. 1880

Pirosmani gradually taught himself to paint. One of his specialties was painting directly onto black oilcloth. In 1882, with self-taught George Zaziashvili, he opened a painting workshop, where they made signboards. In 1890, he worked as a railroad conductor. In 1893, he co-founded a dairy farm in Tbilisi, which he left in 1901. Throughout his life, Pirosmani, who was poor, was willing to take ordinary jobs including housepainting and whitewashing buildings. He also worked for shopkeepers in Tbilisi, creating signboards, paintings, and portraits, according to their orders. Although his paintings had some local popularity (about 200 survive) his relationship with professional artists remained uneasy; making a living was always more important to him than aesthetic abstractions.

In April 1918, he died in the 1918 flu pandemic as a result of malnutrition and liver failure. He was buried at the Nino cemetery; the exact location was not registered and is unknown.

== Work ==
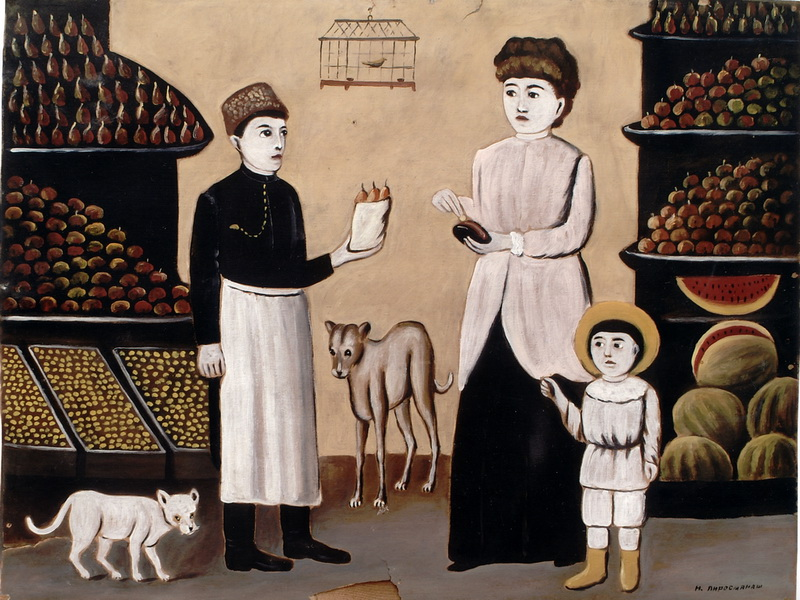
A Tatar Fruiterer, 1910, Georgian National Museum

Pirosmani's paintings were influenced by the social conditions of his time and place. There are many works about merchants, shopkeepers, workmen, and noblemen groups. Pirosmani was fond of nature and rural life. He rarely employed city landscapes. He made many animal paintings. He was the only Georgian animalist. Pirosmani also was attracted by historical figures and themes such as Shota Rustaveli, King Tamar, Giorgi Saakadze, as well as ordinary Georgian people and their everyday lives.

Usually, Pirosmani painted on oilcloth. Unlike other artists, Niko didn't aim at a pure imitation of the nature and paid no attention to details. Some of his paintings are monochrome. His paintings demonstrate the author's sharp compositional consideration. Placements of the figures are frontal, while faces do not demonstrate a specific mood.

In the 1910s, he won the enthusiasm of the Russian poet Mikhail Le-Dantyu and the artist Kirill Zdanevich and his brother Ilia Zdanevich. Ilia Zhdanevich wrote a letter about Pirosmani to the newspaper Zakavkazskaia Rech, which it published on February 13, 1913. He undertook to publicise Pirosmani's painting in Moscow. The Moscow newspaper Moskovskaia Gazeta of 7 January wrote about the exhibition "Mishen" where self-taught painters exhibited, among them four works by Pirosmani: "Portrait of Zhdanevich", "Still Life", "Woman with a Beer Mug", and "The Roe". Critics writing later in the same newspaper were impressed with his talent.

In the same year, an article about Niko Pirosmani and his art was published in Georgian newspaper Temi.

The Society of Georgian Painters, founded in 1916 by Dito Shevardnadze, invited Pirosmani to its meetings and began to take him up, but his relations with the society were always uneasy. He presented his painting "Georgian Wedding" to the Society. One of the members published a caricature of him, which greatly offended him. His continuing poverty, compounded by the economic problems caused by the First World War, meant that his life ended with his work little recognised.

== Posthumous reputation ==
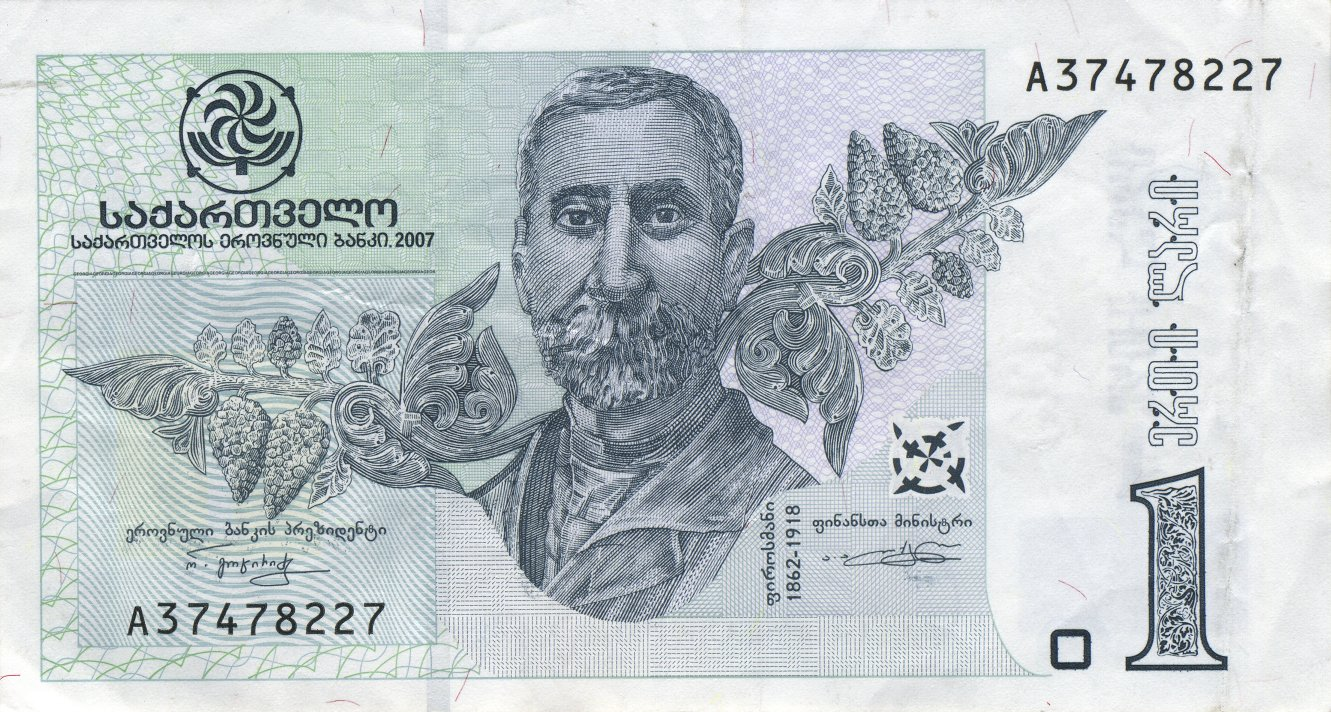
Niko Pirosmani on a Georgian lari banknote of the 2002 series.

After his death, Pirosmani gained international reputation when he became admired as a 'naïve' painter in Paris and elsewhere. His paintings were represented at the first big exhibition of Georgian painters in 1918. From 1920 onwards, a number of articles were published about him. The first monograph on Pirosmani was published in 1926 in Georgian, Russian, and French.

Interest in Pirosmani increased in the 1950s.

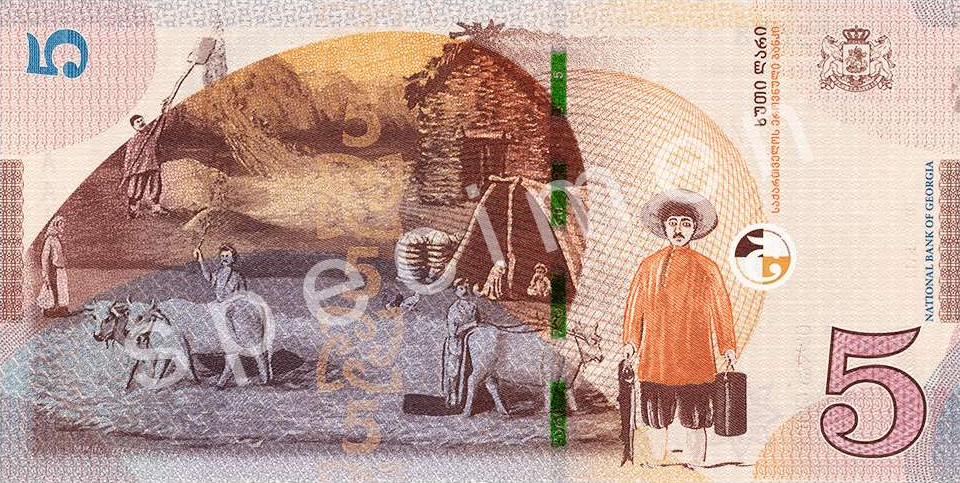
Details from Pirosmani's paintings Threshing and Fisherman in a Red Shirt on the 5 lari banknote of the 2017 series.

In 1969, a film about him was made, titled Pirosmani. He inspired a portrait sketch by Pablo Picasso (1972). Pirosmani is also depicted on a Georgian lari bill (although this bill is rarely seen in circulation today, since 1 lari coins are far more common). A periodic newspaper titled Pirosmani is published in two languages in Istanbul. In 1983 Edward Kuznetsov produced the first catalogue raisonné on Pirosmani's work, entitled Niko Pirosmani, 1862-1918.

Exhibitions of his work have been held in Kyiv (1931), Warsaw (1968), Paris (The Louvre) (1969), Vienna (1969), Nice and Marseilles (1983), Tokyo (1986), Zurich (1995), Nantes (1999), Turin (2002), Kyiv, Istanbul (2008), Minsk, Vézelay and Vilnius (2008–2009), Vienna again (2018–19) and Basel (Foundation Beyeler) (2023–2024).

Today, 146 of his works are shown in the Art Museum of Georgia and sixteen paintings are exhibited in the Historical-Ethnographic Museum of Sighnaghi. Works by Pirosmanashvíli are part of the Zander Collection in Cologne. A monument was installed in Tbilisi. There is also the Niko Pirosmanashvili Museum in Mirzaani, Georgia, in one of his abodes.

Niko Pirosmani is alleged to be the inspiration for the male protagonist portrayed in the Russian song Million Roses.

== Gallery ==
Self-portrait, 1900, Private collection

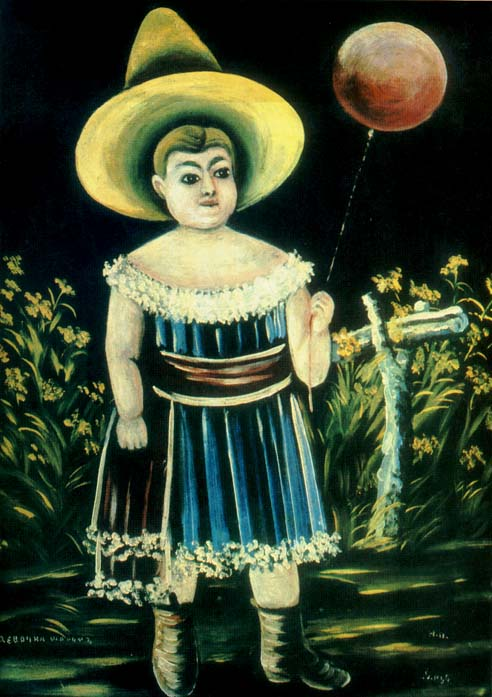
Little Girl with a Balloon, 1900s, Art Museum of Georgia

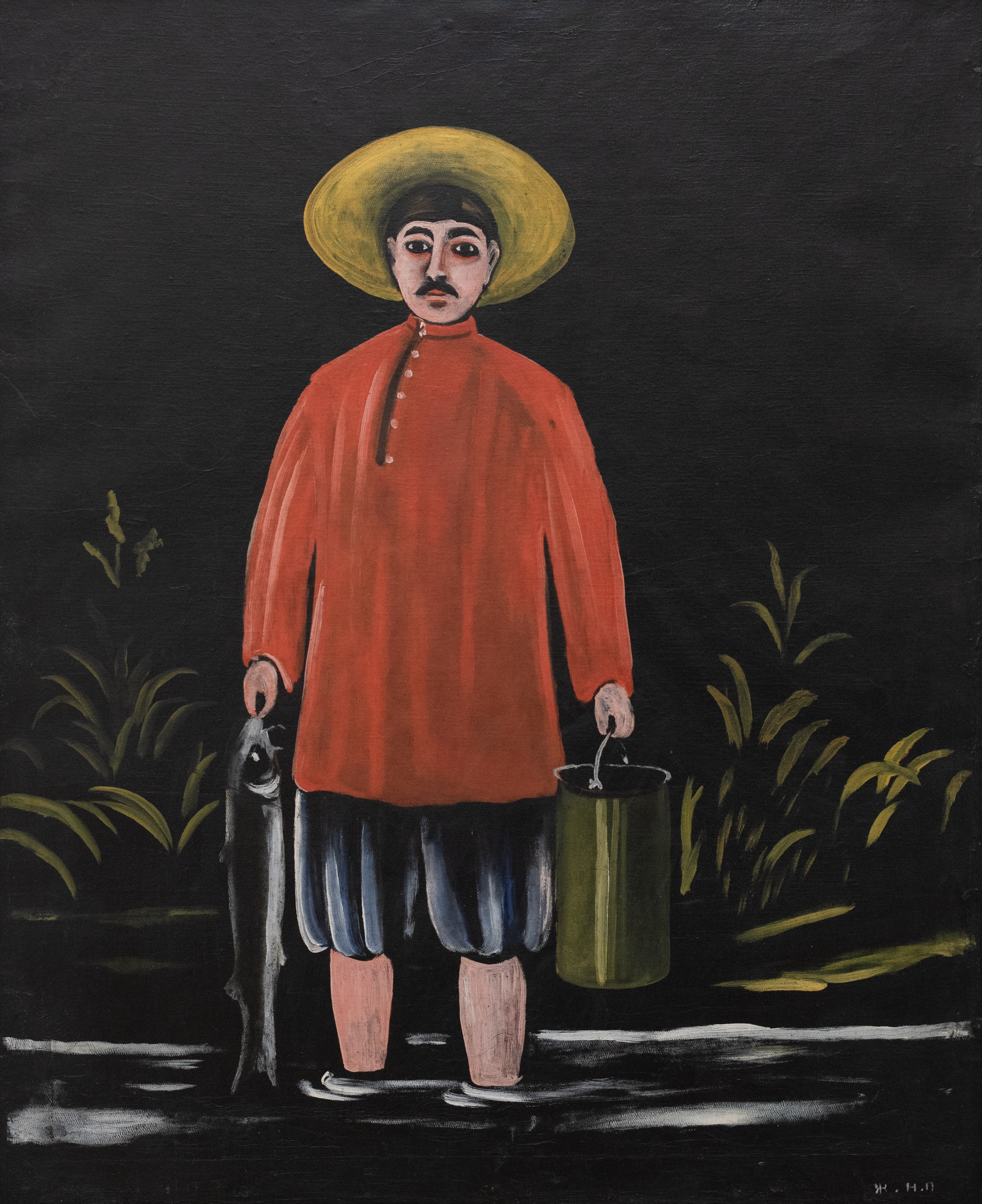
A Fisherman, 1900s, Art Museum of Georgia

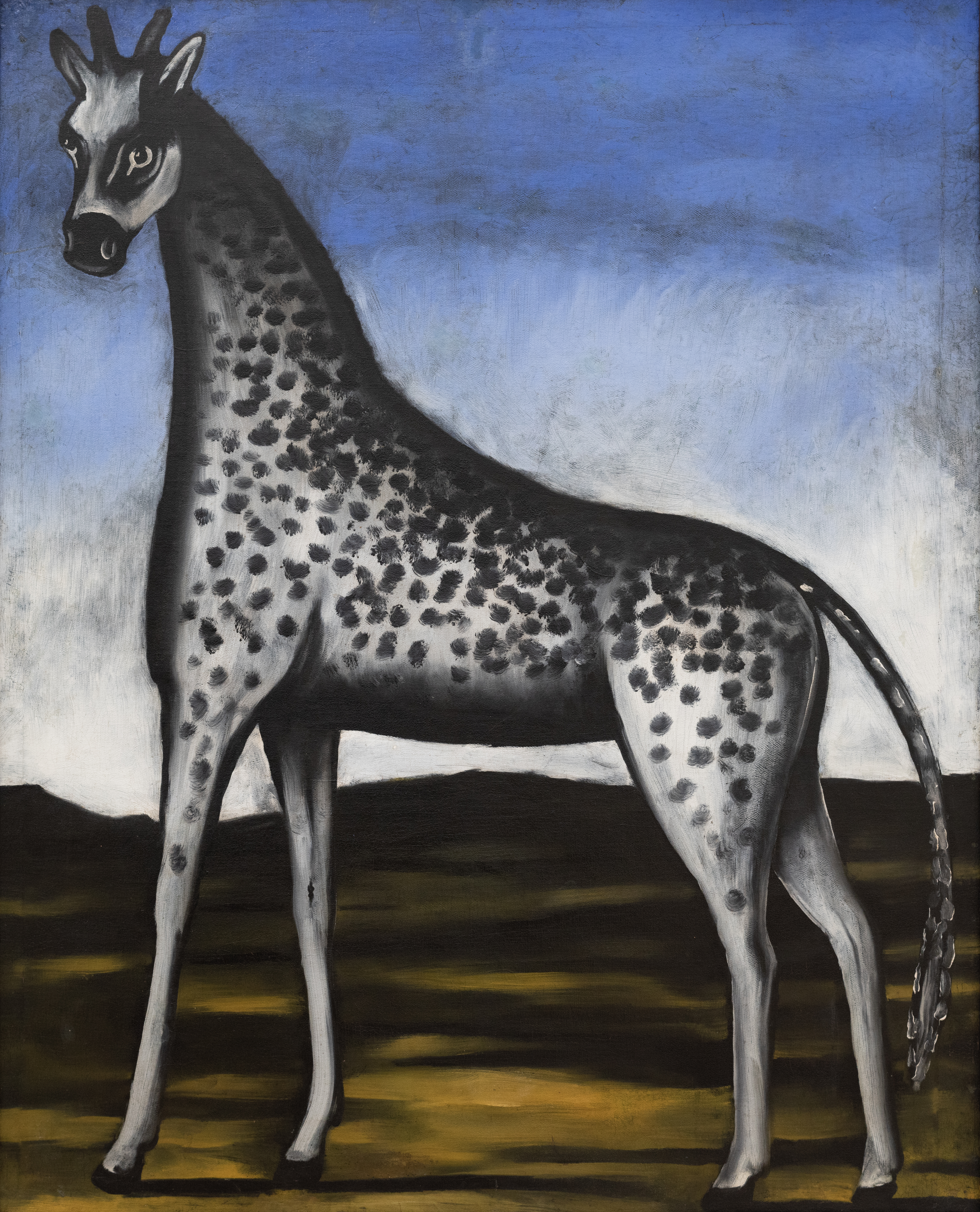
Giraffe, 1900s, Art Museum of Georgia

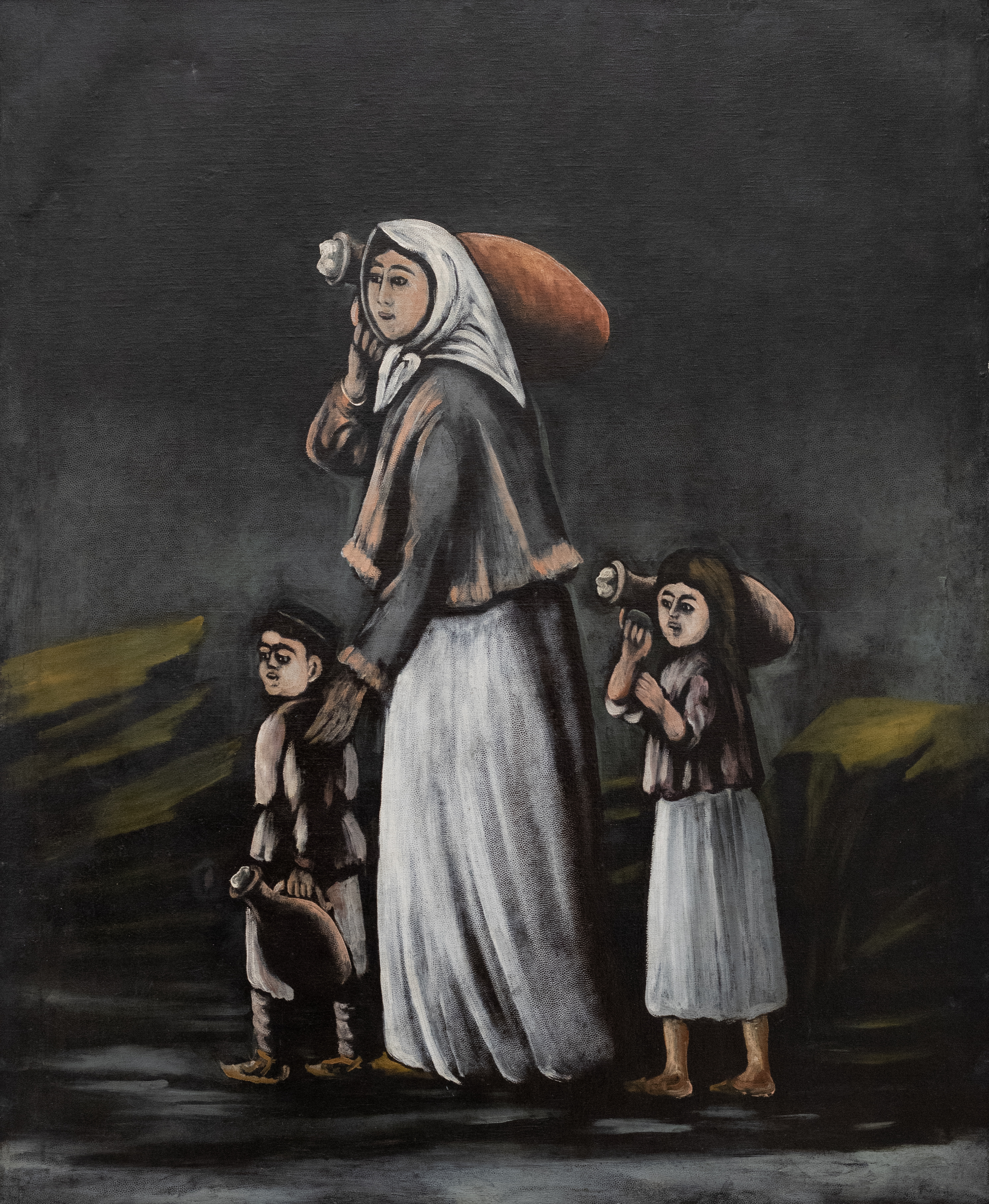
A Peasant Woman with Children Going to Fetch Water, 1900s, Art Museum of Georgia

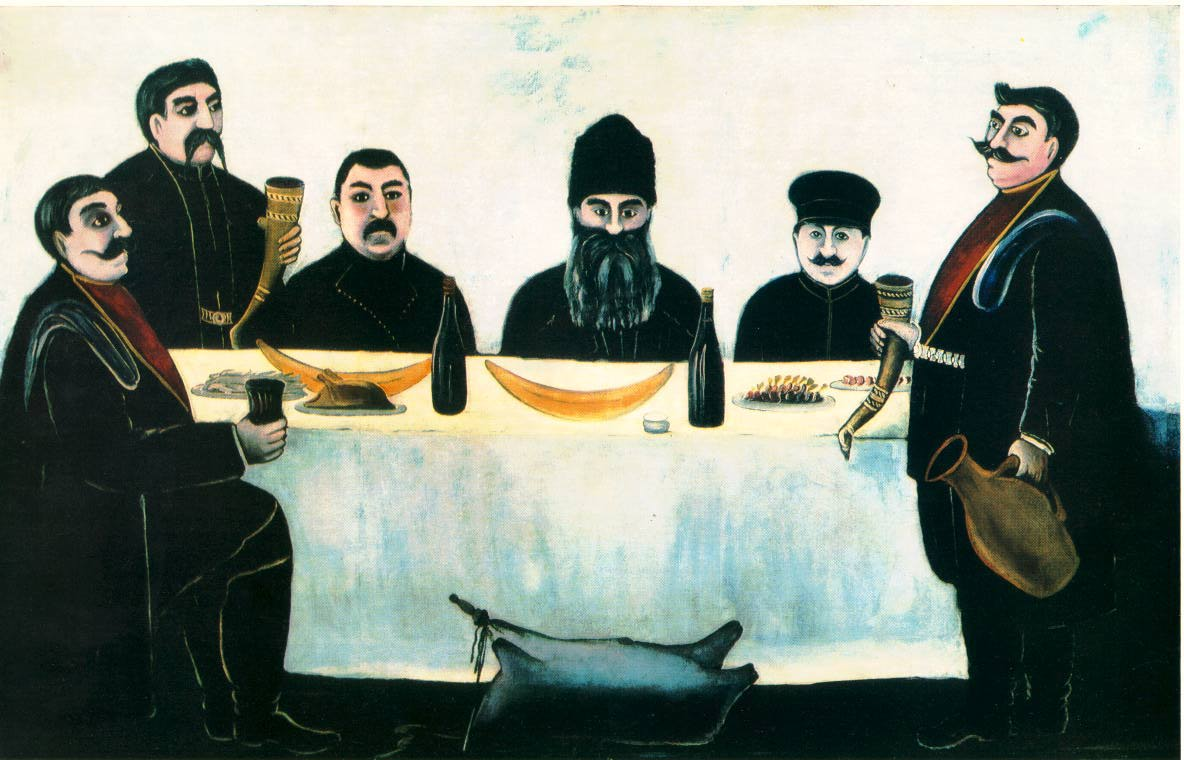
Begos' Friends, 1910s, State Museum of Oriental Art in Moscow

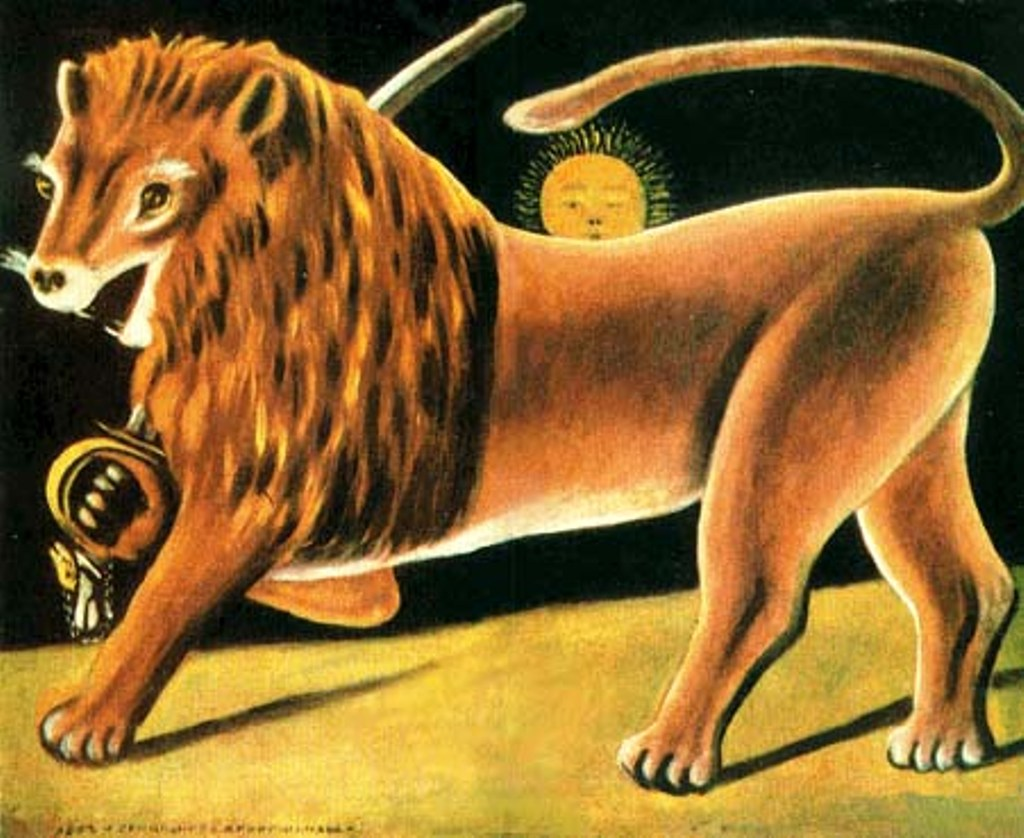
Iranian Lion, from 1862 until 1918, Art Museum of Georgia

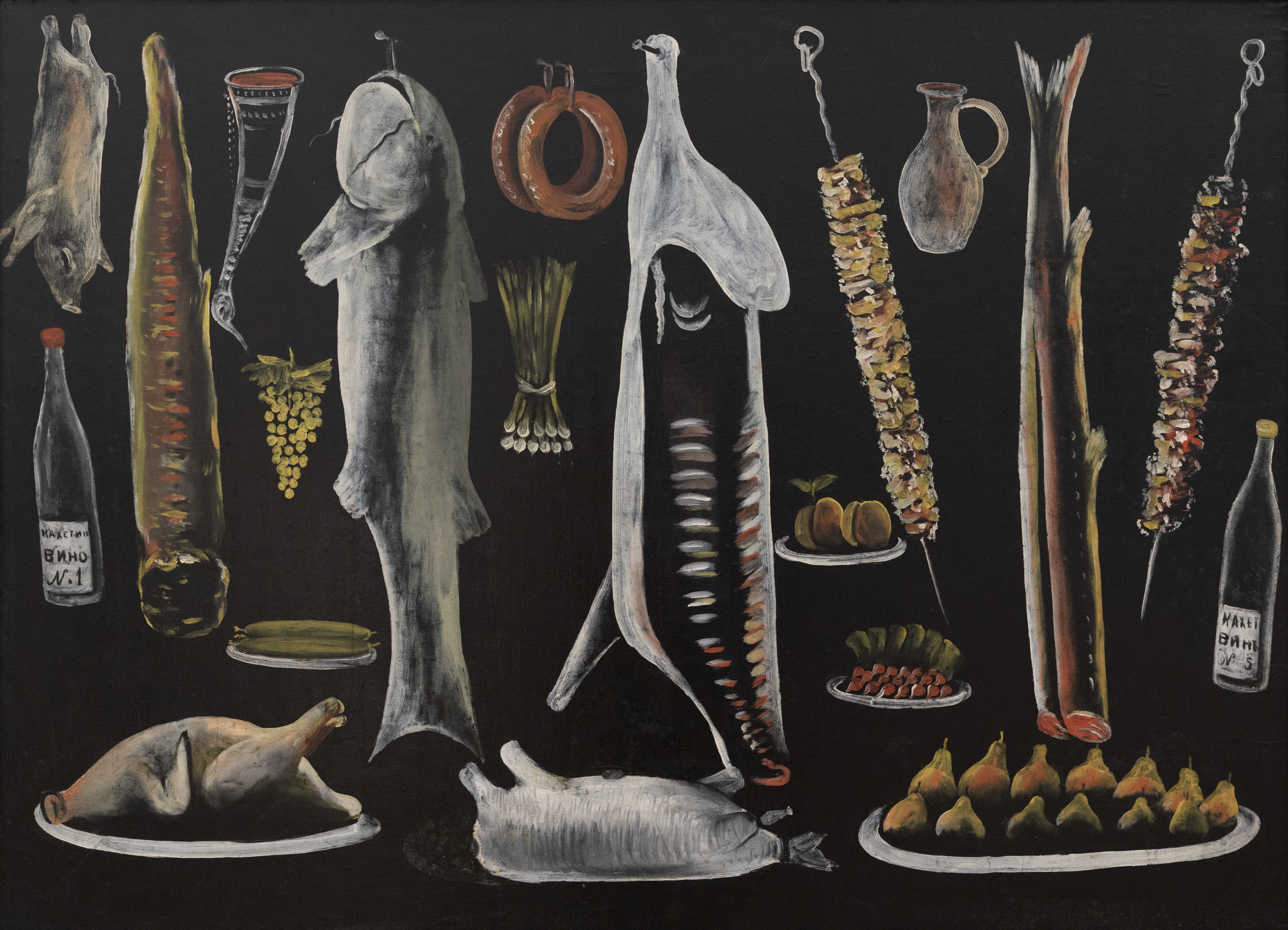
Still-Life, 1900s, Art Museum of Georgia

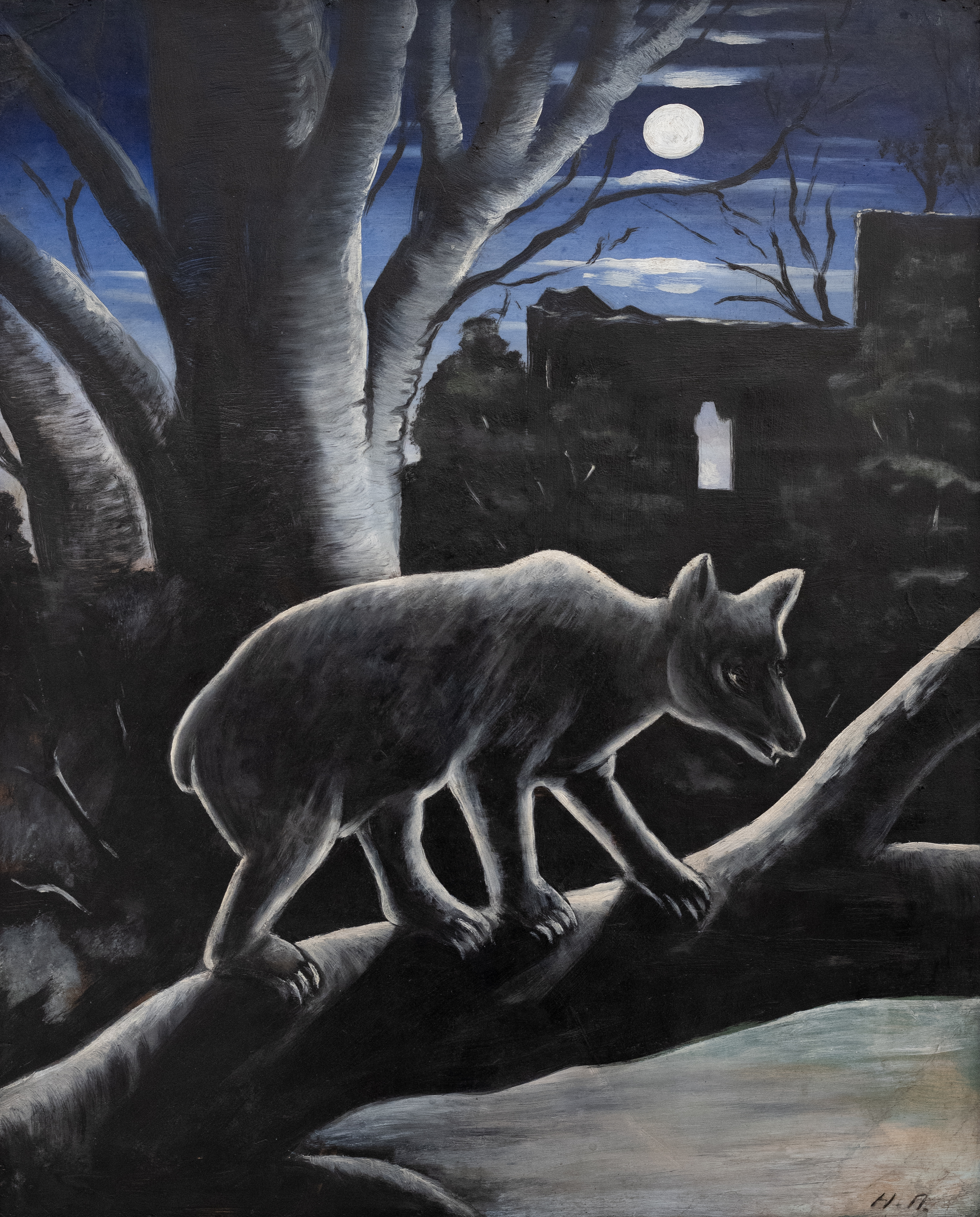
A Bear on a Moonlit night

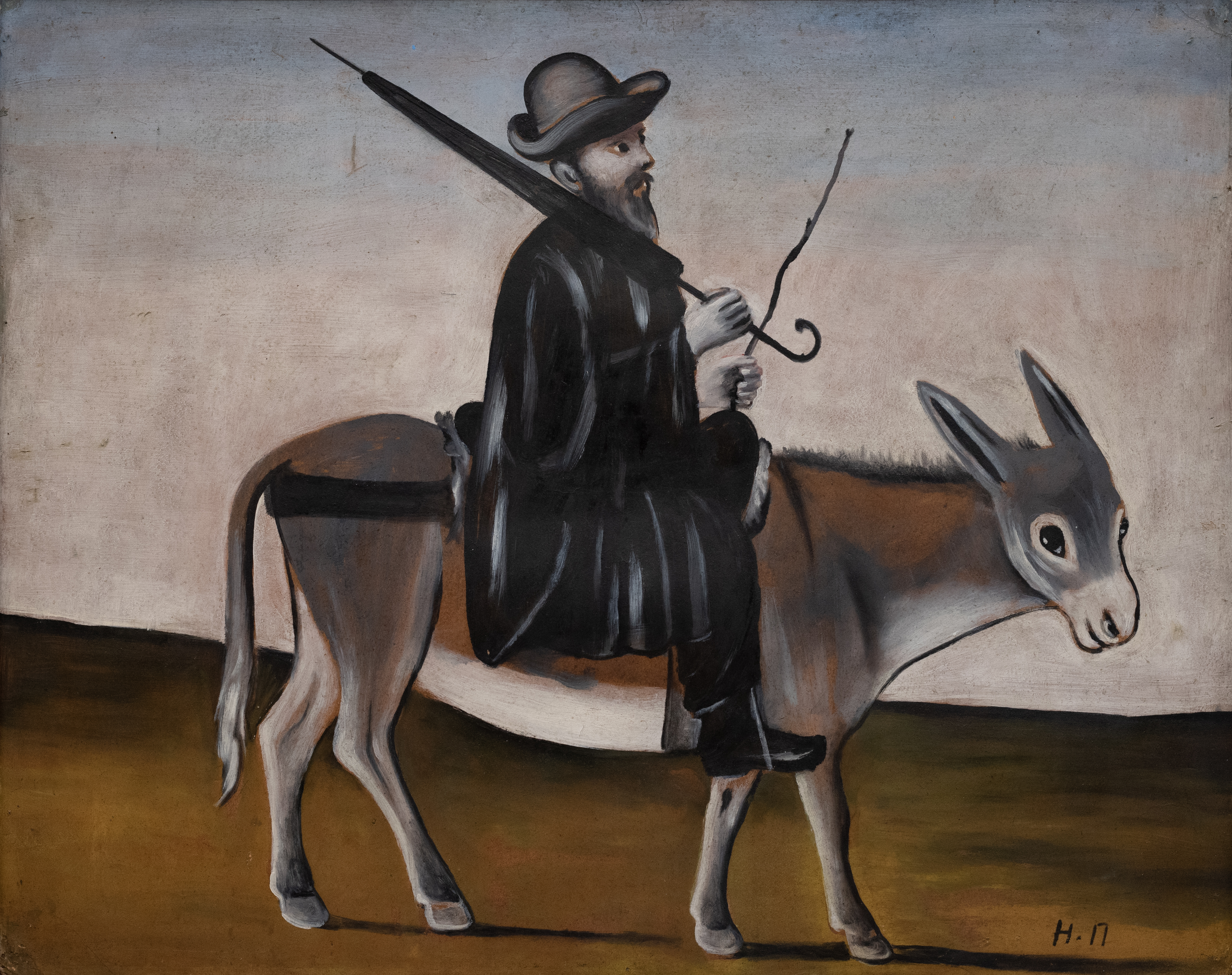
Healer on a Donkey, 1900s, Sighnaghi Museum

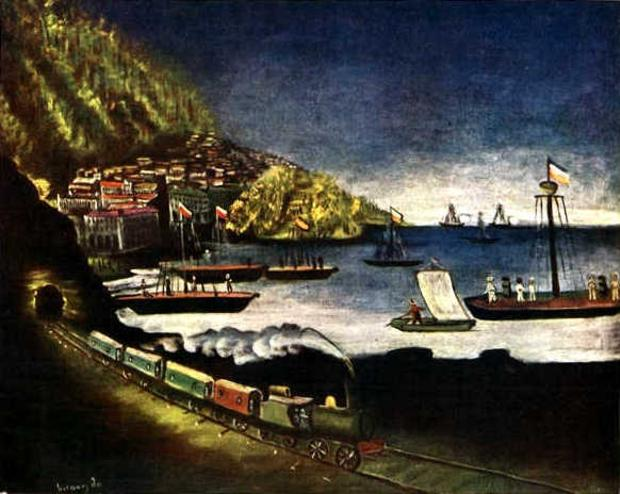
Batumi port, 1900s, Art Museum of Georgia

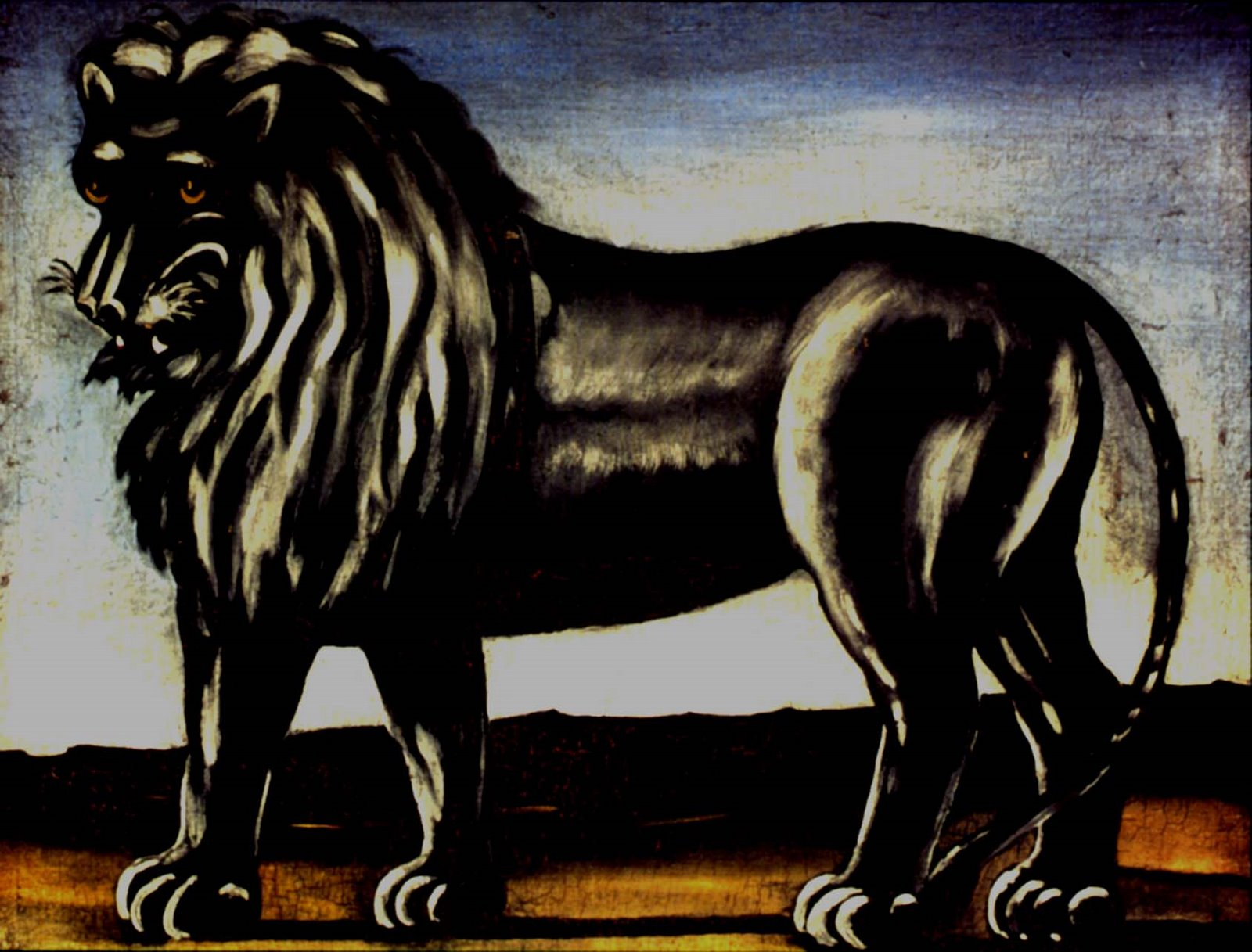
Black Lion, 1905

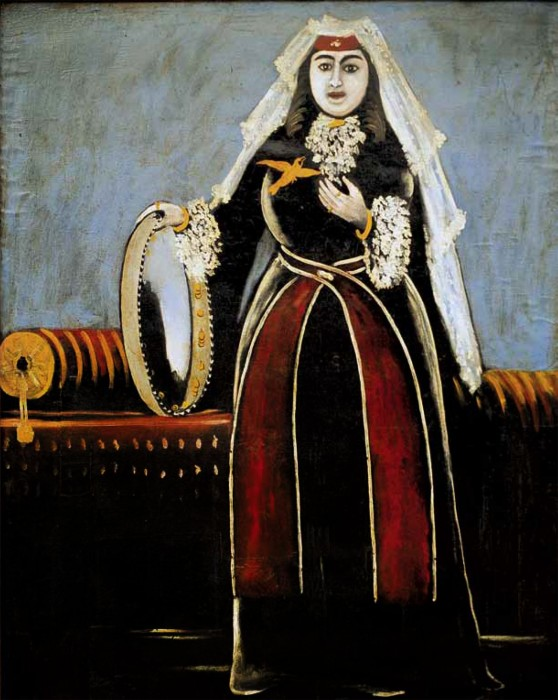
A Georgian Woman with Tambourine / Georgian woman with Lechaki, 1910s, Private collection

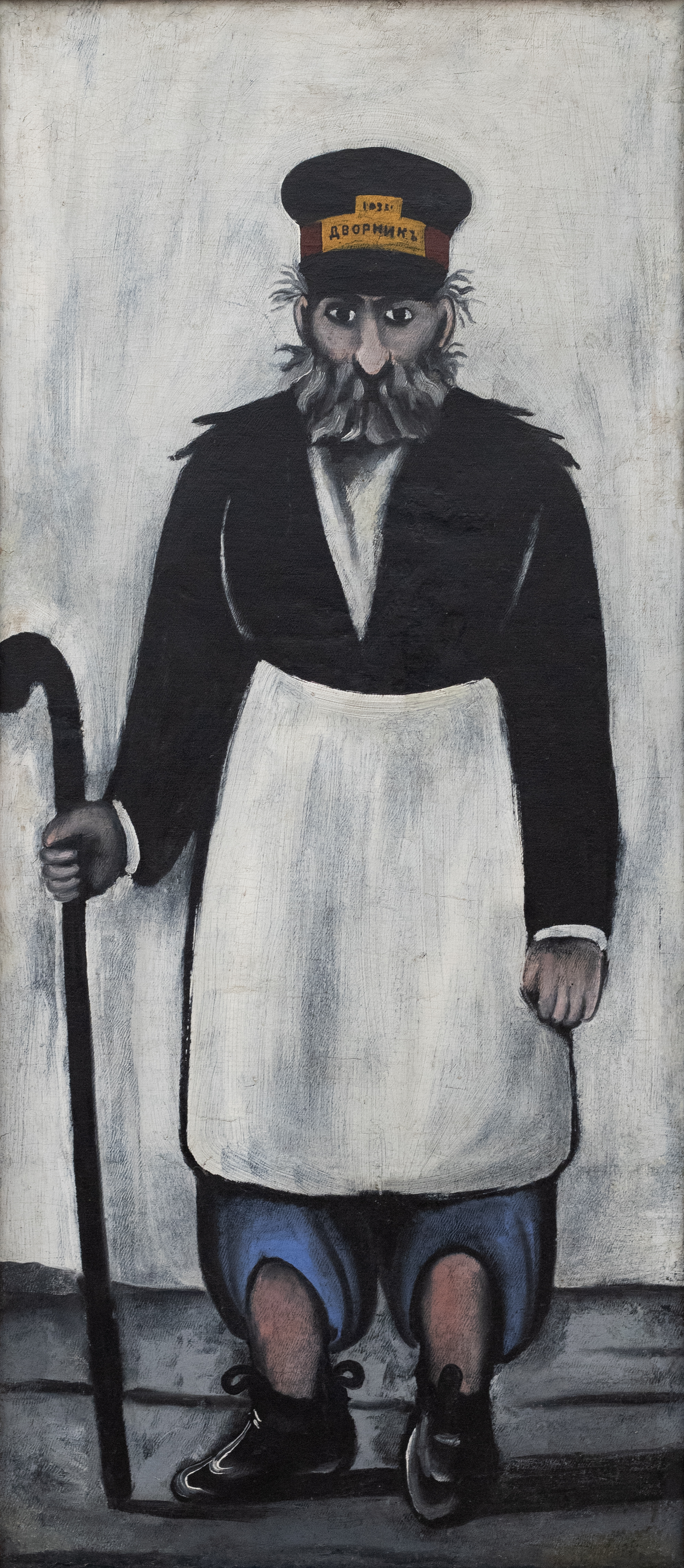
Janitor

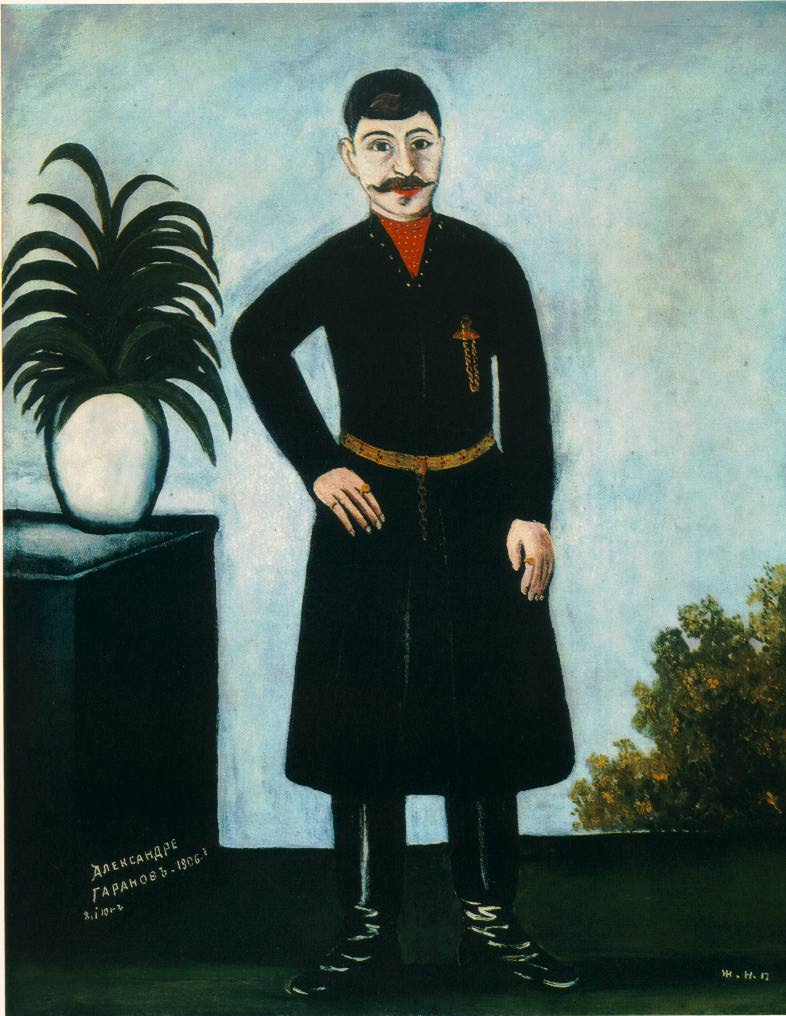
Portrait of Alexander Garanov, 1906, Art Museum of Georgia

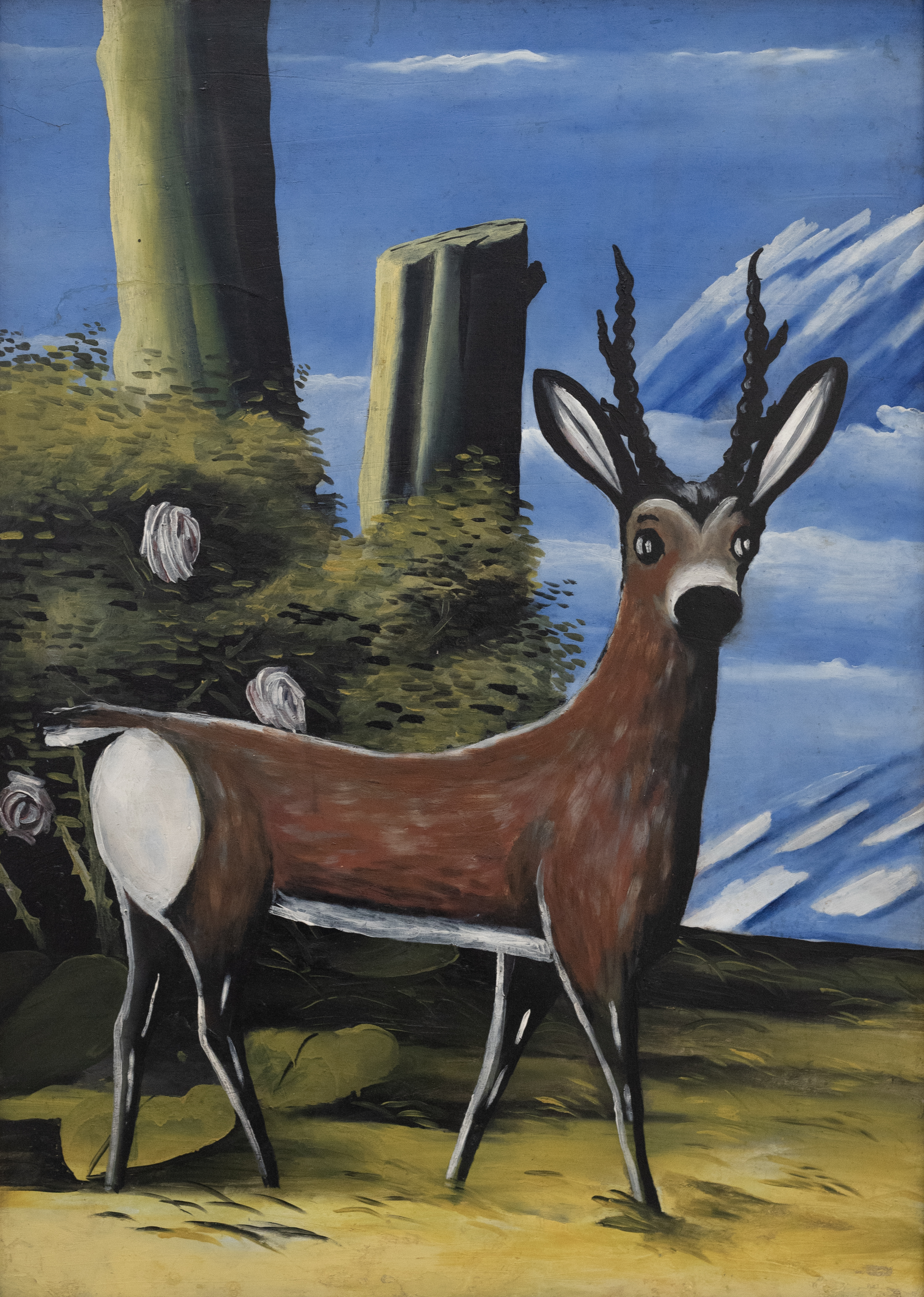
A Doe against Landscape (Stag), 1913, Art Museum of Georgia

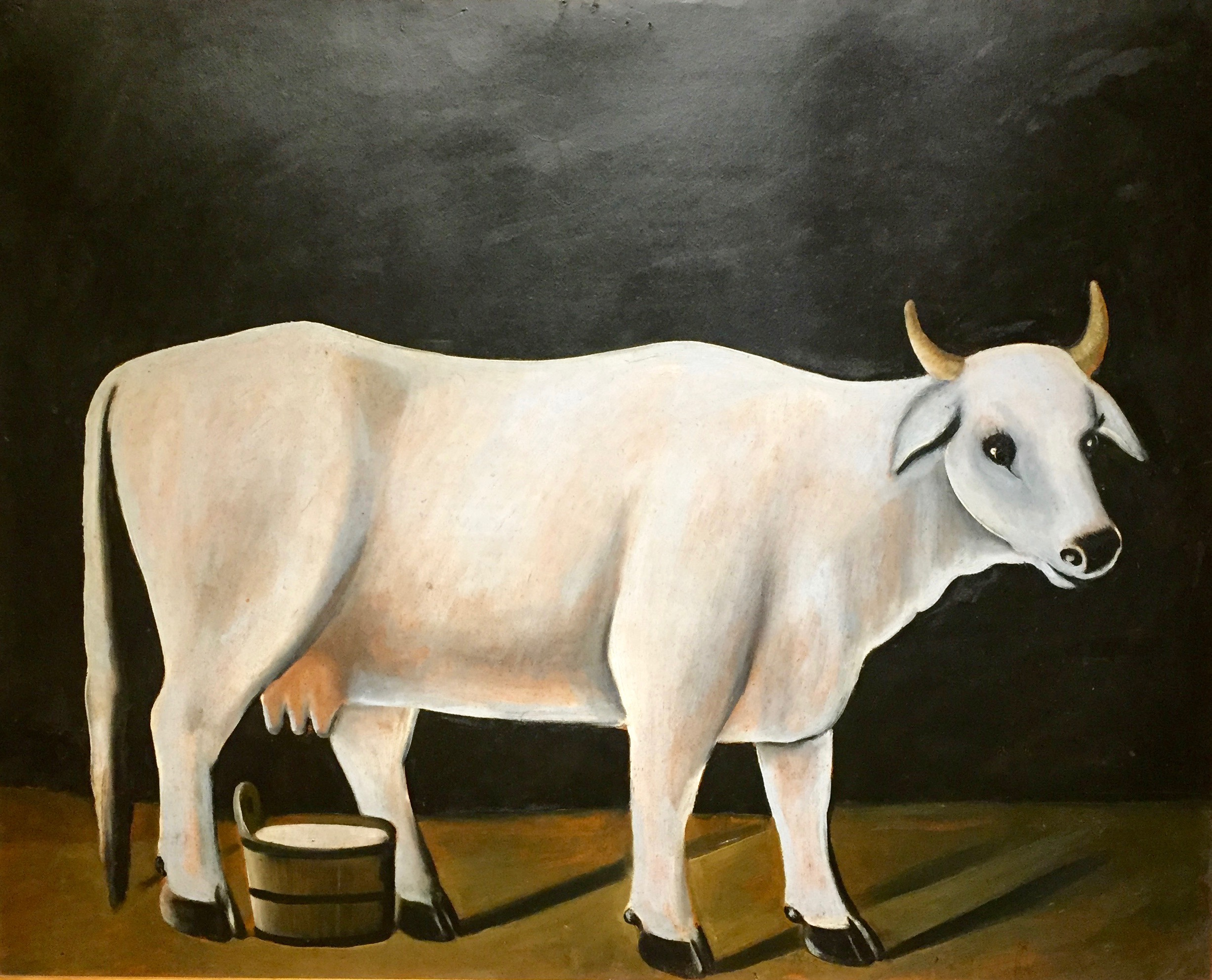
White Cow on a Black Background, 1915, Private collection

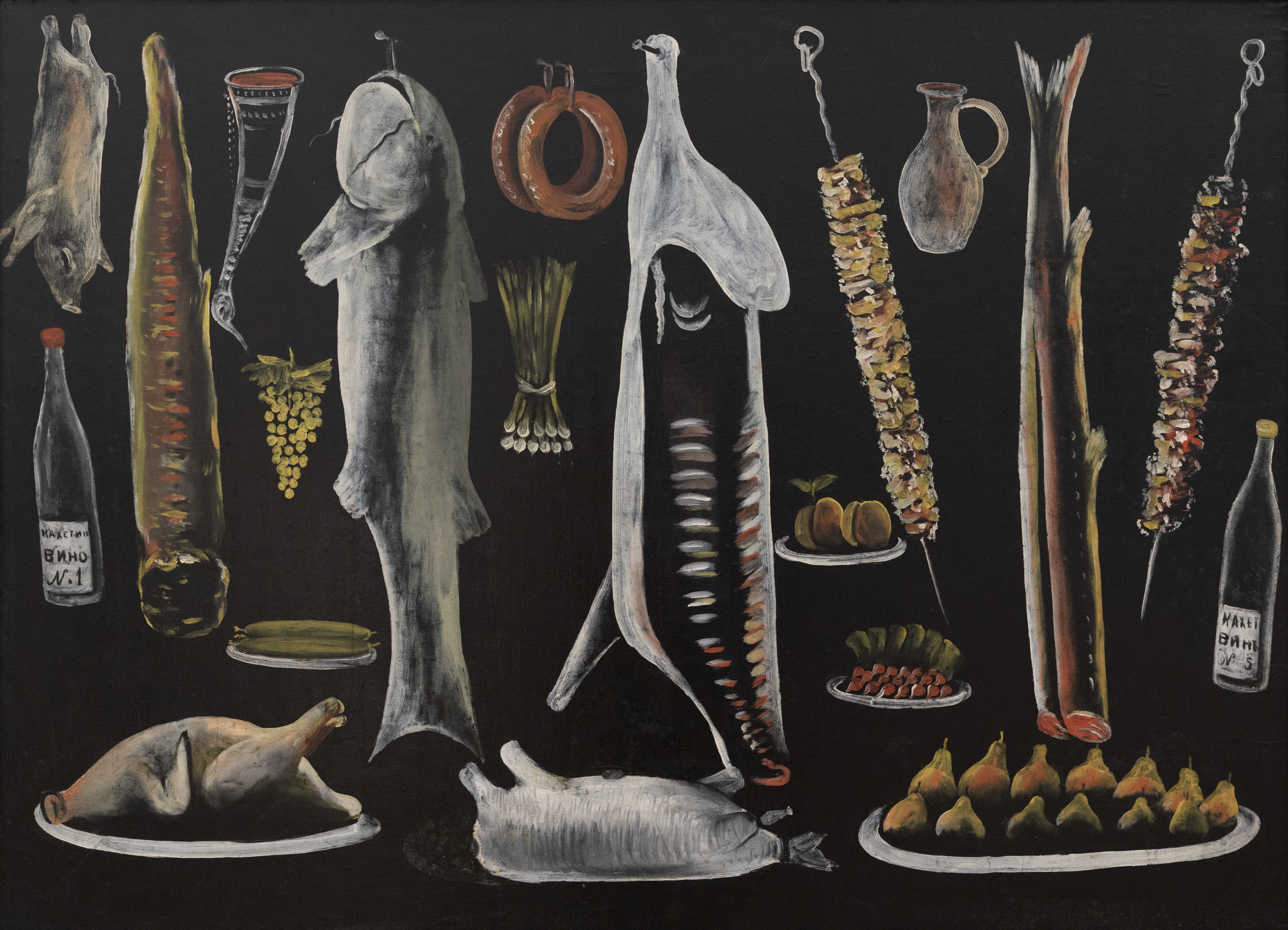
Still Life

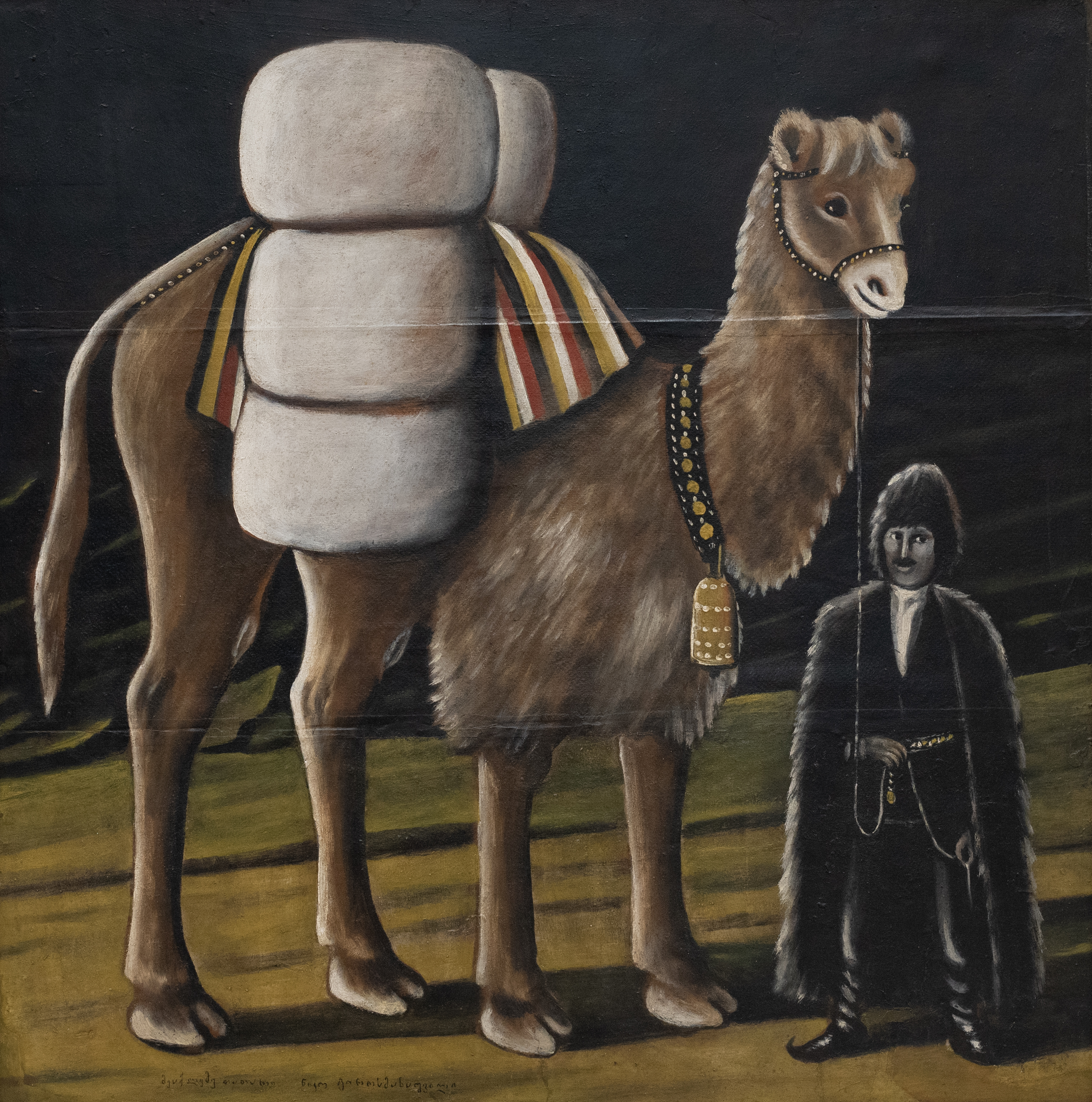
Tatar camel driver

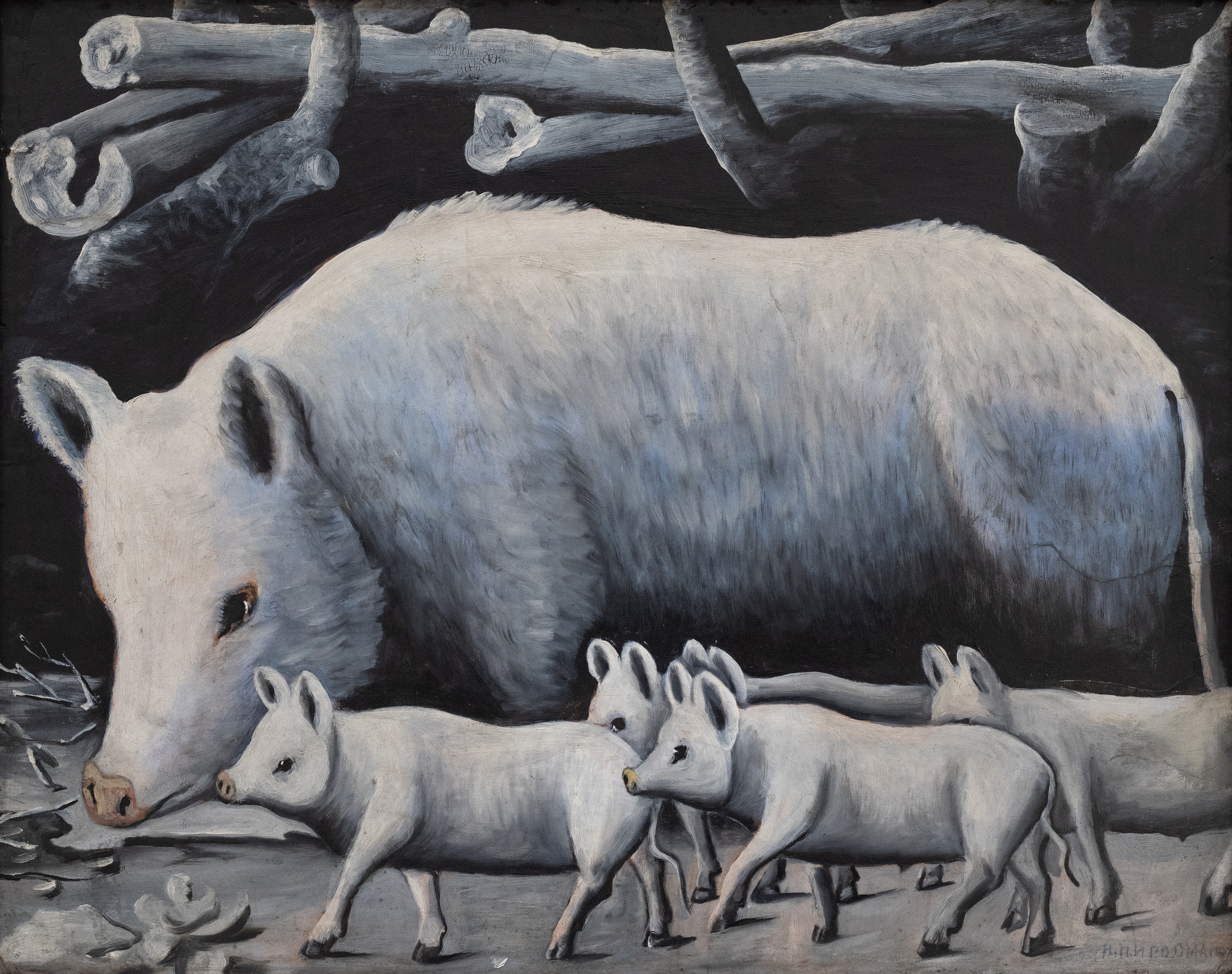
White Sow with Piglets
