= Tamaz Meliava =

Georgian film director

- Born: 23 December 1929
- Died: 27 August 1972 (aged 42)
- Occupations: Film director Screenwriter
- Years active: 1958-1973

Tamaz Meliava (Georgian: თამაზ მელიავა; Russian: Тамаз Георгиевич Мелиава; 23 December 1929 – 27 August 1972) was a Soviet Georgian film director and screenwriter. He directed six films between 1958 and 1973.

== Filmography ==
- Mtvaris motatseba (meore seria) (1973)
- Mtvaris motatseba (pirveli seria) (1972)
- Londre (1966)
- Tetri karavani (1963)
- Prostaya veshch (1958)
- U tikhoi pristani (1958)
