= Avto Varazi =

Georgian artist and painter

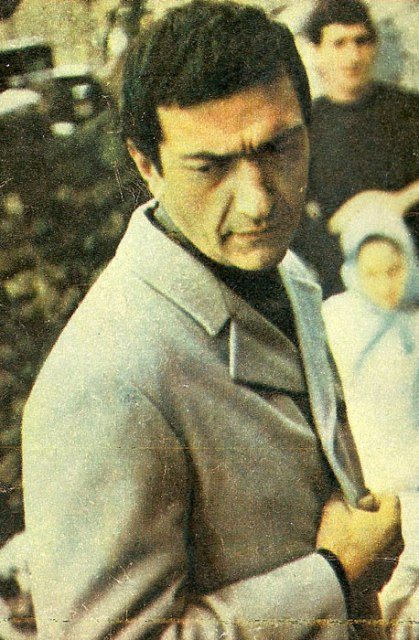
- A still from the film “Pirosmani,” in which Avto Varaz portrays Pirosmani
- Born: Avtandil Varazashvili; 25 October 1926; Tbilisi, Georgia
- Died: 3 March 1977 (aged 50); Tbilisi, Georgia
- Education: Georgian Technical University, Faculty of Architecture
- Known for: Painting, mixed media
- Notable work: The Bull's Head, Bibliopole, Violin and Guitar, The Fish in a Laced Frame

Avto Varazi (Georgian: ავთო ვარაზი) was a Georgian artist and painter.

Avto Varazi occupies a special place in Georgian painting of the 20th century. The artist applied various painting systems and techniques with equal success. Religious motifs also took a significant role in Varazi's work, which was quite unusual for a painter of the Soviet period. His teacher was a Soviet Georgian artist, graphic designer and sculptor Alexander Bazhbeuk-Melikyan.

Varazi was the first among Georgian artists to apply the technique of collage.

Varazi's works are spread among world museums, while the fate of some of them remains unknown. Bull's Head is kept at MoMa. Another one, also named Bull's Head, representing a lamb's head, is displayed in Zimmerli Art Museum at Rutgers University. The other Bull's Head remains with Alexander Glezer in Paris, and The Octopus is in George Costakis' private collection in Greece. His 15 works are exhibited in Georgian National Museum; others are displayed in Kutaisi, Tsageri, Ambrolauri Museum of Fine Arts and Senaki.

- (in Georgian) ქართული საბჭოთა ენციკლოპედია, ტომი 4, გვერდი 297, თბილისი, 1979
