= Giorgi Shengelaia =

Georgian and Soviet film director (1937–2020)

- Born: 11 May 1937; Moscow, Russian SFSR
- Died: 17 February 2020 (aged 82); Tbilisi, Georgia
- Occupations: Film director Screenwriter; Actor
- Years active: 1961–2005
- Spouses: Sofiko Chiaureli (m. 1957; div. 1977) Ketevan Ninua (m. 1985; div. 1990)
- Children: 3, Nikoloz Shengelaya, Alexander Shengelaya, George Shengelaya
- Parents: Nikoloz Shengelaia (father); Nato Vachnadze (mother)
- Awards: Shota Rustaveli Prize (1989)

Giorgi Shengelaia (Georgian: გიორგი შენგელაია; Russian: Гео́ргий Никола́евич Шенгела́я; 11 May 1937 – 17 February 2020) was a Georgian and Soviet film director. He directed 14 films since 1961. His film Pirosmani (a poetic film about the great Georgian primitive artist Niko Pirosmanishvili who worked circa 1915) won the Grand Prize at the Chicago International Film Festival in 1974 and went on to international critical acclaim. His 1985 film The Journey of a Young Composer was entered into the 36th Berlin International Film Festival where he won the Silver Bear for Best Director.

== Filmography ==
| Year | Film | Director | Writer | Actor | Note |
|---|---|---|---|---|---|
| 1956 | In Our Courtyard | | | Yes | |
| 1961 | AOtaraant Widow | | | Yes | |
| 1961 | Ambavi erti kalishvilisa | | | Yes | |
| 1961 | Niko Pirosmanishvili | Yes | Yes | | Documentary |
| 1962 | Alaverdoba | Yes | Yes | | Short film |
| 1965 | Djildo | Yes | | | Short film |
| 1965 | Rats ginakhavs, vegar nakhav | | | Yes | |
| 1966 | Matsi Khvitia | Yes | Yes | | |
| 1969 | Pirosmani | Yes | Yes | | |
| 1973 | Melodies of Vera Quarter | Yes | Yes | | |
| 1976 | Kvishani darchebian | Yes | Yes | Yes | |
| 1980 | Sikvaruli kvelas unda | Yes | | | |
| 1984 | The Journey of a Young Composer | Yes | Yes | | |
| 1987 | Khareba and Gogia | Yes | Yes | | |
| 1996 | Kahdzhi Murat | Yes | Yes | | |
| 1996 | Orpeosis sikvdili | Yes | Yes | | |
| 2000 | Georgian grapes | Yes | Yes | | |
| 2005 | Midioda matarebeli | Yes | Yes | | |
