= Keto and Kote (film) =

- Russian: Кето и Котэ
- Directed by: Vakhtang Tabliashvili; Shalva Gedevanishvili
- Written by: Victor Dolidze (opera); Avksenty Tsagareli (play); Sergo Pashalishvili
- Starring: Medea Japaridze; Batu Kraveishvili; Tamari Chavchavadze; Meri Davitashvili; Shalva Gambashidze
- Cinematography: Aleksandre Digmelovi
- Edited by: Vasili Dolenko
- Music by: Archil Kereselidze
- Production company: Tbilisi Film Studio
- Release date: October 10, 1948
- Running time: 89 min.
- Country: Soviet Union
- Languages: Russian; Georgian

Keto and Kote (Georgian: ქეთო და კოტე) is a 1948 Soviet comedy film directed by Vakhtang Tabliashvili and Shalva Gedevanishvili is based on play Hanuma by Avksenty Tsagareli.

== Plot ==
The rich merchant of Tbilisi dreams of intermarrying with the aristocracy (in order to be known as an aristocrat himself) and is going to give his beautiful daughter Keto (Medea Japaridze) for the old, vicious and ruined prince Levan Palavandishvili (Petre Amiranashvili). The girl is desperate, because she loves the young poet Kote (Batu Kraveishvili), the nephew of the prince, who, in the guise of a teacher, goes to see her.

With the help of friends and matchmaker Khanuma (Tamari Chavchavadze), young lovers manage to outwit old people and achieve their own happiness.

== Cast ==
- Medea Japaridze as Keto
- Batu Kraveishvili as Kote
- Tamari Chavchavadze as Khanuma
- Meri Davitashvili as Qabato
- Shalva Gambashidze as Makari
- Veriko Anjaparidze as princess
- Petre Amiranashvili as Levan
- Tamari Tsitsishvili as Nino
- Vaso Godziashvili as Siko
- Giorgi Shavgulidze as Niko
- Sergo Zakariadze

== Release ==
Vakhtang Tabliashvili's film watched 22.7 million viewers, which is 764 results in the history of Soviet film distribution.

== See also ==
- Khanuma
