= Archil Kereselidze =

Georgian composer (1912–1971)

- არჩილ კერესელიძე
- Archil Kereselidze
- Born: 24 December 1912; Gunib, Dagestan, Russian Empire
- Died: 21 December 1971 (aged 58); Tbilisi, Georgian SSR, Soviet Union
- Resting place: Didube Pantheon, Tbilisi
- Occupation: Composer

Archil Pavles dze Kereselidze (Georgian: არჩილ კერესელიძე; 24 December 1912 – 21 December 1971) was a Georgian composer. Active in opera, operetta, theatre and film music, he was named a People's Artist of the Georgian SSR in 1961.

== Early life and education ==
Kereselidze was born on 24 December 1912 in Gunib, in Dagestan. He graduated from the Tbilisi State Conservatoire in 1934 and from the Moscow Conservatory in 1939, where he studied composition under Nikolai Myaskovsky. As a youth he was encouraged by the composer Zacharia Paliashvili.

== Career ==
From 1940 to 1944 Kereselidze taught polyphony at the Tbilisi State Conservatoire, and in the 1940s he headed the music department of the Marjanishvili Theatre in Tbilisi. From 1953 until his death he worked as a music editor and composer at the Georgian Film Studio.

His works include the opera Bashi-Achuki (1945), the ballet Nazibrola (1947), the musical comedies Under the Tbilisi Sky (1949), Return from the Moon (1963) and Cherry Blossom (1965), a symphony and two piano concertos, as well as music for theatre productions. He also wrote scores for many Georgian films, including Keto and Kote (1948), Magdana's Donkey (1955) and The Right Hand of the Grand Master (1969).

== Awards and honours ==
- Honoured Art Worker of the Georgian SSR (1950)
- Order of the Badge of Honour (1958)
- People's Artist of the Georgian SSR (1961)

== Death ==
Kereselidze died in Tbilisi on 21 December 1971 and was buried at the Didube Pantheon.
