= List of Georgian films of the 1940s =

Georgian films of 1940s

A list of the films produced in the cinema of Georgia in the 1940s, ordered by year of release:

Title	Director	Cast	Genre	Studio/notes
1940
The Friendship	Siko Dolidze	Sergo Zaqhariadze, Tamar Tsitsishvili, Emanuel Apkhaidze		
1941
1942
Giorgi Saakadze	Mikheil Chiaureli	Akaki Khorava, Veriko Anjaparidze		
1943
1944
1945
1946
1947
1948
Keto and Kote	Vakhtang Tabliashvili, Shalva Gedevanishvili	Medea Japaridze		
1949
