= List of Georgian films of the 1950s =

Georgian films of 1950s

A list of the films produced in the cinema of Georgia in the 1950s, ordered by year of release:

Title	Director	Cast	Genre	Studio/notes
1950
The spring in Sakeni	Nikoloz Sanishvili	Edisher Maghalashvili, Liana Asatiani, Ivane Gvinchadze		
1951
1952
1953
1954
1955
Magdana's Donkey	Rezo Chkheidze, Tengiz Abuladze	Dudukhana Tserodze		
1956
Bashi-Achuki	Leo Esakia, Zakaria Gudavadze	Otar Koberidze, Lia Eliava, Medea Chakhava, Dodo Chichinadze, Kote Daushvili, Iusuf Kobaladze. Meri Davitashvili, Guram Saghadze		
The Scrapper	Nikoloz Sanishvili	Leila Abashidze, Tengiz Mushkudiani, Gogi Gegechkori		
1957
Mamluk	Davit Rondeli	Otar Koberidze		
1958
1959
Maia of Tskneti	Revaz Chkheidze	Leila Abashidze		
