= Tamar Tsitsishvili =

Georgian actress (1908–1988)

- თამარ ციციშვილი
- Tamar Tsitsishvili
- Born: 19 December 1908; Odesa, Russian Empire
- Died: 1 September 1988 (aged 79); Tbilisi, Georgian SSR, Soviet Union
- Resting place: Didube Pantheon, Tbilisi
- Occupation: Actress
- Years active: 1936–1986

Tamar Iosebis asuli Tsitsishvili (Georgian: თამარ ციციშვილი; 19 December 1908 – 1 September 1988) was a Georgian film and stage actress. She became one of the best-known faces of Georgian cinema after starring in the film Dariko (1936) and was named a People's Artist of the Georgian SSR in 1981.

== Early life and education ==
Tsitsishvili was born on 19 December 1908 in Odesa, in the Russian Empire. She graduated from the Faculty of Philosophy of Tbilisi State University in 1930.

== Career ==
Tsitsishvili appeared in films from 1936, the year she played the title role in Siko Dolidze's Dariko, a part that made her a star of Georgian cinema. Over the following decades she became one of the most familiar character actresses of Georgian film, often cast in maternal and noblewoman roles. Her many screen credits include Keto and Kote (1948), The Right Hand of the Grand Master (1970), and The Abduction of the Moon (1973), as well as roles in the late films of two leading Georgian directors—Tengiz Abuladze's Repentance and Sergei Parajanov and Dodo Abashidze's The Legend of Suram Fortress (both 1984)—and Nana Jorjadze's Robinsonade, or My English Grandfather (1986).

She also worked in the theatre, performing at the Marjanishvili Theatre in Tbilisi around 1949–1950.

== Awards and honours ==
- Honoured Artist of the Georgian SSR (1953)
- People's Artist of the Georgian SSR (1981)

== Personal life ==
Tsitsishvili was a granddaughter of the writer Ioseb Mamatsashvili. She died in Tbilisi on 1 September 1988 and was buried at the Didube Pantheon.
