= Vaso Godziashvili =

Georgian actor (1905–1976)

- ვასო გოძიაშვილი
- Born: Vasil Godziashvili; 27 November [O.S. 14 November] 1905; Tbilisi, Tiflis Governorate, Russian Empire
- Died: 30 January 1976 (aged 70); Tbilisi, Georgian SSR, Soviet Union
- Resting place: Didube Pantheon, Tbilisi
- Occupation: Actor
- Years active: 1924–1976
- Spouse: Sesilia Takaishvili (divorced)

Vasil "Vaso" Davitis dze Godziashvili (Georgian: ვასო გოძიაშვილი; 27 November [O.S. 14 November] 1905 – 30 January 1976) was a Georgian stage and film actor. For more than four decades a leading actor of the Marjanishvili Theatre in Tbilisi, he was named a People's Artist of the USSR in 1958.

== Early life and career ==
Godziashvili was born on 27 November [O.S. 14 November] 1905 in Tbilisi. From 1922 to 1924 he studied at the Tbilisi drama studio under Akaki Pagava, and was a pupil of Kote Marjanishvili and Sandro Akhmeteli. He was an actor of the Rustaveli Theatre from 1924 to 1930, and from 1930 until his death he worked at the Marjanishvili Theatre, where he became one of the company's leading actors. He was also a prominent figure in Georgian variety theatre and a laureate of the first All-Union competition of variety artists.

Equally at home in dramatic, comic and grotesque roles, Godziashvili created what is regarded as a landmark of the Georgian acting tradition in his portrayal of Luarsab Tatkaridze in Is This a Man?!, based on the story by Ilia Chavchavadze. His other roles included Khlestakov in Gogol's The Government Inspector, Arbenin in Lermontov's Masquerade, the title role in Shakespeare's Richard III, Caesar in Shaw's Caesar and Cleopatra, and Zandukeli in Ietim Mosashvili's His Star, the role for which he received the Stalin Prize.

== Film ==
Godziashvili also worked in cinema. His screen roles included Siko in Keto and Kote (1948) and the Catholicos Melkisedek in The Right Hand of the Grand Master (1970).

== Awards and honours ==
- People's Artist of the Georgian SSR (1947)
- People's Artist of the USSR (1958)
- Stalin Prize, Second Class (1952), for the role of Zandukeli in His Star
- Shota Rustaveli State Prize of the Georgian SSR (1971)
- Order of Lenin (1950)
- Order of the October Revolution
- Order of the Red Banner of Labour (1966)
- Order of the Badge of Honour (1941)

== Personal life ==
Godziashvili was married to the actress Sesilia Takaishvili (1906–1984), with whom he had a son, Davit; the couple later divorced. He died in Tbilisi on 30 January 1976 and was buried at the Didube Pantheon.
