= Levan Khotivari =

Georgian film director (1902–1980)

- ლევან ხოტივარი
- Levan Khotivari
- Born: 4 January 1902; Kutaisi, Kutaisi Governorate, Russian Empire
- Died: 14 December 1980 (aged 78); Tbilisi, Georgian SSR, Soviet Union
- Resting place: Saburtalo Pantheon, Tbilisi
- Occupations: Film director, actor, screenwriter
- Years active: 1924–1980

Levan Iosebis dze Khotivari (Georgian: ლევან ხოტივარი; 4 January 1902 – 14 December 1980) was a Georgian film actor, director and screenwriter. He worked at the Georgian Film Studio, where he directed mainly comedies, and was named a People's Artist of the Georgian SSR in 1980.

== Early life and career ==
Khotivari was born on 4 January 1902 in Kutaisi. He finished the Kutaisi classical gymnasium in 1921 and from 1923 to 1925 studied at a film-actors' studio in Georgia.

From 1924 he appeared as an actor in more than a dozen films, and from 1944 he worked as an assistant and second director at the Georgian Film Studio. He made his debut as a director in 1954 and went on to direct, mostly comedies. His films include Chrichina (1954, with Siko Dolidze), I Will Tell the Truth (1957), Bridegroom Without a Diploma (1961), Tariel Golua (1968) and A Merry Romance (1972); he also co-wrote several of these screenplays.

== Awards and honours ==
- People's Artist of the Georgian SSR (1980)

== Death ==
Khotivari died in Tbilisi on 14 December 1980 and was buried at the Saburtalo Pantheon.
