= Shalva Gambashidze =

Georgian actor (1899–1955)

- შალვა ღამბაშიძე
- Born: 1 August 1899; Zestaponi, Kutaisi Governorate, Russian Empire
- Died: 18 May 1955 (aged 55); Tbilisi, Georgian SSR, Soviet Union
- Resting place: Didube Pantheon, Tbilisi
- Occupations: Actor, theatre director
- Years active: 1920–1955
- Spouse: Ana Donzhashvili

Shalva Ksenophontes dze Gambashidze (Georgian: შალვა ღამბაშიძე; 1 August 1899 – 18 May 1955) was a Georgian stage and film actor and theatre director. A pupil of Kote Marjanishvili and one of the founders of Soviet Georgian theatre, he was a leading actor of the Marjanishvili Theatre and was named a People's Artist of the Georgian SSR in 1939.

== Early life and education ==
Gambashidze was born on 1 August 1899 in Zestaponi. After finishing the Kutaisi Real School in 1917, he trained from 1918 to 1920 at the Jabadari drama studio in Tbilisi.

== Career ==
From 1920 Gambashidze was an actor of the theatre in Batumi, and from 1921 he worked at the Rustaveli Theatre in Tbilisi under Kote Marjanishvili. From 1928 until his death he was an actor of the Marjanishvili Theatre, also serving as its director and artistic head from 1937 to 1947.

Among his stage roles were Esteban in Lope de Vega's Fuenteovejuna, the title role in Shakespeare's Othello, and the Governor in Gogol's The Government Inspector. He also appeared in films, including Dariko (1936), Giorgi Saakadze (1942) and Keto and Kote (1948).

== Awards and honours ==
- People's Artist of the Georgian SSR (1939)
- Order of the Red Banner of Labour (1941)
- Two Orders of Lenin (1946, 1950)

== Personal life ==
Gambashidze was married to the actress Ana Donzhashvili. He died in Tbilisi on 18 May 1955 and was buried at the Didube Pantheon.
