= Petre Amiranashvili =

Georgian operatic baritone (1907–1976)

- პეტრე ამირანაშვილი
- Born: 16 November 1907; Nigoiti, Kutaisi Governorate, Russian Empire
- Died: 26 November 1976 (aged 69); Tbilisi, Georgian SSR, Soviet Union
- Resting place: Didube Pantheon, Tbilisi
- Occupations: Operatic baritone, voice teacher
- Years active: 1930–1976
- Children: Medea Amiranashvili

Petre Varlamis dze Amiranashvili (Georgian: პეტრე ვარლამის ძე ამირანაშვილი; 16 November 1907 – 26 November 1976) was a Georgian operatic baritone and voice teacher. A leading soloist of the Tbilisi Opera and Ballet Theatre for more than four decades, he was named a People's Artist of the USSR in 1950 and was awarded the Stalin Prize for his work on the Georgian operatic stage.

== Early life and education ==
Amiranashvili was born on 16 November 1907 in the village of Nigoiti, in present-day Lanchkhuti Municipality in the Guria region of western Georgia, then part of the Kutaisi Governorate of the Russian Empire. In 1930 he graduated from the Tbilisi State Conservatoire, where he studied in the class of Professor Olga Bakhutashvili-Shulgina.

== Career ==
From 1930 Amiranashvili was a soloist of the Tbilisi Opera and Ballet Theatre, named after Zacharia Paliashvili, a position he held until the end of his life. He became one of the central figures of 20th-century Georgian opera and took part in the premieres of new works by Georgian composers.

Among his Georgian roles were Kako in Andria Andriashvili's Kako the Robber, Avtandil in Shalva Mshvelidze's The Tale of Tariel—a portrayal for which he received the Stalin Prize—Gocha in Shalva Azmaiparashvili's Khevisberi Gocha, and Chalkhia in Otar Taktakishvili's Mindia. In the international repertoire he sang the title role in Tchaikovsky's Eugene Onegin; Gryaznoy in Rimsky-Korsakov's The Tsar's Bride; the title roles in Verdi's Rigoletto and Otello, Amonasro in Aida and Count di Luna in Il trovatore; Escamillo in Bizet's Carmen; Figaro in Rossini's The Barber of Seville; Tonio in Leoncavallo's Pagliacci; and Scarpia in Puccini's Tosca. He appeared on the opera stages of Moscow, Leningrad, Kyiv and Minsk, and from 1955 toured abroad, including in China, Iran, Turkey, Czechoslovakia and Poland. He also performed widely as a concert and chamber singer.

In 1948 Amiranashvili appeared in the Georgian musical film Keto and Kote in the role of Prince Pantiashvili.

From 1962 until his death he taught at the Tbilisi State Conservatoire.

== Awards and honours ==
- People's Artist of the Georgian SSR (1943)
- People's Artist of the USSR (1950)
- People's Artist of the Armenian SSR (1970)
- Stalin Prize, First Class (1947), for the role of Avtandil in The Tale of Tariel
- Zacharia Paliashvili State Prize of the Georgian SSR (1971)
- Order of Lenin (1950)
- Four Orders of the Red Banner of Labour

== Personal life ==
Amiranashvili's daughter, Medea Amiranashvili (1930–2023), was also an opera singer and a People's Artist of the USSR. He died in Tbilisi on 26 November 1976 and was buried at the Didube Pantheon.
