= Dodo Antadze =

Georgian theatre director (1900–1978)

- დოდო ანთაძე
- Dodo Antadze
- Born: Isaak Antadze; 10 October 1900; Vardzia, Kharagauli district, Russian Empire
- Died: 18 April 1978 (aged 77); Tbilisi, Georgian SSR, Soviet Union
- Resting place: Didube Pantheon, Tbilisi
- Occupation: Theatre director
- Years active: 1920–1974

Dodo Antadze (Georgian: დოდო ანთაძე; born Isaak Antadze; 10 October 1900 – 18 April 1978) was a Georgian theatre director. A pupil of Kote Marjanishvili, he led several of the principal theatres of Soviet Georgia and was named a People's Artist of the USSR in 1971.

== Early life and education ==
Antadze was born on 10 October 1900 in the village of Vardzia, in the Kharagauli district of present-day Georgia. From 1919 to 1920 he studied at the drama studio of Giorgi Jabadari in Tbilisi, and he later became a pupil of the director Kote Marjanishvili.

== Career ==
Antadze began at the Rustaveli Theatre as an assistant director and, from 1925, as a director. From 1928 he took part in establishing the company that became the Marjanishvili Theatre, working closely with Marjanishvili, and from 1933 to 1938 he was its director and artistic head. He subsequently led the Lado Meskhishvili Theatre in Kutaisi (1938–1952), the Griboedov Russian Drama Theatre in Tbilisi (1952–1957), and again the Rustaveli Theatre (1957–1962). From 1962 to 1974 he chaired the Theatrical Society of Georgia.

His productions included Shakespeare's Othello (1939) and King Lear (1941) and Gogol's The Government Inspector (1952). He was also the author of memoirs on the history of Georgian theatre, including Days of the Recent Past (two volumes, 1962–1966) and Together with Marjanishvili (1975). He died in 1978.

== Awards and honours ==
- People's Artist of the Georgian SSR (1940)
- People's Artist of the USSR (1971)
- Kote Marjanishvili State Prize of the Georgian SSR (1977), for the book Together with Marjanishvili
- Three Orders of the Red Banner of Labour
- Two Orders of the Badge of Honour

== Death ==
Antadze died in Tbilisi on 18 April 1978 and was buried at the Didube Pantheon.
