= Giorgi Shavgulidze =

Georgian actor (1910–1959)

- გიორგი შავგულიძე
- Giorgi Shavgulidze
- Born: 16 November 1910; Kutaisi, Kutaisi Governorate, Russian Empire
- Died: 13 April 1959 (aged 48); Tbilisi, Georgian SSR, Soviet Union
- Resting place: Didube Pantheon, Tbilisi
- Occupation: Actor
- Years active: 1928–1959
- Spouse: Liziko Vachnadze

Giorgi Vladimeris dze Shavgulidze (Georgian: გიორგი შავგულიძე; 16 November 1910 – 13 April 1959) was a Georgian stage and film actor. A leading actor of the Marjanishvili Theatre in Tbilisi, he was awarded the Stalin Prize in 1952 and named a People's Artist of the Georgian SSR in 1955.

== Career ==
Shavgulidze was born on 16 November 1910 in Kutaisi. He began acting in 1928 in the Kutaisi–Batumi theatre company led by Kote Marjanishvili, and moved with the troupe to Tbilisi, where it became the Marjanishvili Theatre. Equally at home in dramatic and comic roles, he played Nikifor in Ioseb Mosashvili's His Star — the role for which he received the Stalin Prize — and the postmaster Shpekin in Gogol's The Government Inspector.

From 1938 he also acted in films, appearing in Giorgi Saakadze (1943), the title role of Davit Guramishvili (1946), and Keto and Kote (1948), among others. He died in 1959.

== Awards and honours ==
- Stalin Prize, 2nd class (1952)
- People's Artist of the Georgian SSR (1955)
- Two Orders of the Red Banner of Labour (10 November 1955 and 17 April 1958)
- Order of the Badge of Honour

== Personal life ==
Shavgulidze was married to the actress Liziko Vachnadze, an Honoured Artist of the Georgian SSR. He died in Tbilisi on 13 April 1959 and was buried at the Didube Pantheon.
