= Giorgi Sagaradze =

Georgian actor (1906–1980)

- გიორგი საღარაძე
- Born: 25 October 1906; Kutaisi, Kutaisi Governorate, Russian Empire
- Died: 12 April 1980 (aged 73); Tbilisi, Georgian SSR, Soviet Union
- Resting place: Didube Pantheon, Tbilisi
- Occupation: Actor
- Years active: 1920s–1980
- Spouse: Tamar Tarkhnishvili
- Children: Guram Sagaradze

Giorgi Ilarionis dze Sagaradze (Georgian: გიორგი საღარაძე; 25 October 1906 – 12 April 1980) was a Georgian stage and film actor. For more than half a century an actor of the Rustaveli Theatre in Tbilisi, he was named a People's Artist of the Georgian SSR in 1950 and received the Stalin Prize.

== Early life and education ==
Sagaradze was born on 25 October 1906 in Kutaisi. In 1925 he became a student of Tbilisi State University while training at the studio attached to the Rustaveli Theatre under Akaki Pagava, and around the same time he joined the theatre's company.

== Career ==
Sagaradze spent his entire career at the Rustaveli Theatre. The first decade of his work was associated with the director Sandro Akhmeteli, in whose heroic-romantic productions—Anzor, Lamara and The Bandits—he created some of his earliest notable roles. He was also a popular figure in Georgian variety theatre, forming a noted satirical duo with the actor Stepane Japaridze.

Among his many stage roles, his portrayal of Shukri in Ietim Mosashvili's play Sunken Stones brought him the Stalin Prize in 1951. He also appeared in films, including Lost Paradise (1937), The Vow (1946), and the television series Data Tutashkhia (1977).

== Awards and honours ==
- Honoured Artist of the Georgian SSR (1943)
- People's Artist of the Georgian SSR (1950)
- Stalin Prize (1951), for the role of Shukri in Sunken Stones
- Order of the Red Banner of Labour (17 April 1958)
- Order of the Badge of Honour (5 September 1936)

== Personal life ==
Sagaradze was married to the actress Tamar Tarkhnishvili, and their son Guram Sagaradze (1929–2013) was also an actor of the Rustaveli Theatre and a People's Artist of the Georgian SSR. Sagaradze died in Tbilisi on 12 April 1980 and was buried at the Didube Pantheon.
