= People's Artist of the Georgian SSR =

Soviet art award

People's Artist of the Georgian SSR (Georgian: საქართველოს სსრ სახალხო არტისტი; Russian: Народный артист Грузинской ССР) was the highest honorary title in the performing arts of the Georgian Soviet Socialist Republic, awarded to outstanding artists of theatre, music, cinema, and dance. It was officially established on 27 May 1936 as the title "Honored Artist of the Republic" and reformed as People's Artist of the Georgian SSR on April 25, 1940, (Note: Before 1936, republic-level People's Artist awards were given out by various entities with different criteria, and later the procedure was standardized.) after which it remained in use until the dissolution of the Soviet Union.

In the hierarchy of Soviet artistic honorary titles, the title ranked one step above "Honoured Artist of the Georgian SSR" and was the republic-level counterpart of the all-Union title People's Artist of the USSR. It was usually conferred no earlier than five years after the Honoured Artist title, and could in turn lead to the all-Union title. After Georgian independence, it was succeeded by the title "People's Artist of Georgia".

It is not to be confused with the visual arts equivalent of the title (Georgian: საქართველოს სსრ სახალხო მხატვარი, Russian: народный художник Грузинской ССР).

== Recipients (partial list) ==
The list below comprises select recipients of the title. The "People's Artist of the USSR" column indicates whether the artist also held the all-Union title People's Artist of the USSR, with the year of conferral where known; many of them also held that title. The table is sorted by name and may be re-sorted by any column.

Name	Native name	Field	Born	Died	People's Artist of the USSR	Notes
Anastasia Abashidze	ანასტასია აბაშიძე	Theatre	1881	1958	—	Georgian actress
Dodo Abashidze	დოდო აბაშიძე	Film	1924	1990	—	Soviet actor
Leila Abashidze	ლეილა აბაშიძე	Film	1929	2018	—	Georgian actress, film director, and writer
Tamar Abashidze	თამარ აბაშიძე	Theatre	1892	1960	—	Russian actor
Vaso Abashidze	ვასო აბაშიძე	Theatre	1854	1926	—	Georgian theater actor and a founder of a realistic acting tradition in Georgia
Tengiz Abuladze	თენგიზ აბულაძე	Film	1924	1994	1980	Soviet film director
Ramzambei Agrba	რაზამბეი აგრბა	Theatre	1913	1980	—	Abkhazian actor
Shota Agsabadze	შოთა აღსაბაძე	Theatre	1896	1966	—	Actor
Sandro Akhmeteli	ალექსანდრე ახმეტელი	Theatre	1886	1937	—	Georgian theater director
Leon Alaverdiani	ლეონ ალავერდიანი	Theatre	1887	1963	—	Armenian actor
Lado Aleksi-Meskhishvili	ლადო ალექსი-მესხიშვილი	Theatre	1857	1920	—	Georgian theatre actor and director
Dimitri Aleksidze	დიმიტრი ალექსიძე	Theatre	1910	1984	1976	Soviet theatre director
Irina Aleksidze	ირინე ალექსიძე	Ballet	1914	1996	—	Ballerina
Isaak Alikhanian	ისააკ ალიხანიანი	Theatre	1876	1946	—	Actor
Vasil Amashukeli	ვასილ ამაშუკელი	Film	1886	1977	—	Georgian film director and cinematographer
Medea Amiranashvili	მედეა ამირანაშვილი	Opera	1930	2023	1976	Soviet opera singer and music educator
Petre Amiranashvili	პეტრე ამირანაშვილი	Opera	1907	1976	1950	Soviet singer and opera singer
Dori Amirbekyan	არტაშეს ამირბეკიანი	Theatre	1905	1983	—	Actor
Ekaterina Amirejibi	ეკატერინე ამირეჯიბი	Theatre	1889	1975	—	Actress
Tengiz Amirejibi	თენგიზ ამირეჯიბი	Music	1927	2013	—	Musician
Nina Ananiashvili	ნინო ანანიაშვილი	Ballet & dance	1963	—	—	Georgian artist
David Andguladze	დავით ანდღულაძე	Opera	1895	1973	1950	Soviet singer and opera singer
Nodar Andguladze	ნოდარ ანდღულაძე	Opera	1927	2013	—	Georgian operatic tenor and music educator
Veriko Anjaparidze	ვერიკო ანჯაფარიძე	Theatre	1897	1987	1950	Georgian actress
Zurab Anjaparidze	ზურაბ ანჯაფარიძე	Opera	1928	1997	1966	Georgian tenor
Dodo Antadze	დოდო ანთაძე	Theatre	1900	1978	1971	Russian actor and theatre director
Emanuel Apkhaidze	ემანუელ აფხაიძე	Theatre	1899	1970	—	Actor
Dimitri Arakishvili	დიმიტრი არაყიშვილი	Music	1873	1953	—	Georgian composer and ethnomusicologist
Zhaneta Archvadze	ჟანეტა არჩვაძე	Theatre	1930	2017	—	Actress
Ana Argun-Konoshok	ანა არგუნ-კონოშოკი	Theatre	1914	1980	—	Actress
Giorgi Asatiani	გიორგი ასათიანი	Film	1914	1977	1967	Soviet camera operator and film director
Aziz Agrba	აზიზ აგრბა	Film	1912	1991	—	Actor
David Badridze	დავით ბადრიძე	Opera	1899	1987	—	Georgian opera singer
Spartak Bagashvili	სპარტაკ ბაღაშვილი	Film	1914	1977	—	Soviet actor
Irakli Bagrationi	ირაკლი ბაგრატიონი	Dance	1909	1979	—	Choreographer
Olga Bakhutashvili-Shulgina	ოლღა ბახუტაშვილ-შულგინა	Opera	1879	1950	—	Singer
Tamar Bakradze	თამარ ბაქრაძე	Theatre	1908	1995	—	Actress
Andria Balanchivadze	ანდრია ბალანჩივაძე	Music	1906	1992	1968	Georgian composer
Meliton Balanchivadze	მელიტონ ბალანჩივაძე	Music	1862	1937	—	Georgian musician
Vasil Balanchivadze	ვასილ ბალანჩივაძე	Theatre	1867	1957	—	Actor
Aleksandre Basilaia	ალექსანდრე ბასილაია	Music	1942	2009	—	Georgian musician
Mariam Baueri	მარიამ ბაუერი	Theatre	1909	1995	—	Ballet
Nikoloz Belakneli	ნიკოლოზ ბელაქნელი	Music	1897	1978	—	Singer
Olga Belenko	ოლღა ბელენკო	Theatre	1914	1999	—	Actress
Tamara Belousova-Shotadze	თამარ ბელოუსოვა-შოთაძე	Theatre	1924	2013	—	Actress
Artem Beroyan	არტემ ბეროიანი	Theatre	1878	1962	—	Actor
Maria Beroyan	მარიამ ბეროიანი	Theatre	1892	1960	—	Armenian actress
Nani Bregvadze	ნანი ბრეგვაძე	Music	1936	—	1983	Georgian singer
Aleksandre Bukia	ალექსანდრე ბუკია	Music	1906	1976	—	Composer
Paata Burchuladze	პაატა ბურჭულაძე	Opera	1955	—	—	Georgian bass
Natalya Burmistrova	ნატალია ბურმისტროვა	Theatre	1918	2008	—	Actress
Elina Bystritskaya	Էլինա Բիստրիցկայա	Theatre	1928	2019	1978	Soviet-Russian actress
Nina Chabieva	ნინა ჩაბიევა	Theatre	1910	1990	—	Actress
Tamar Chabukiani	თამარ ჭაბუკიანი	Theatre	1907	1978	—	Dancer
Vakhtang Chabukiani	ვახტანგ ჭაბუკიანი	Ballet & dance	1910	1992	1950	Georgian ballet dancer, teacher and choreographer
Anastas Chakalidi	ანასტას ჩაკალიდი	Music	1908	1980	—	Singer
Medea Chakhava	მედეა ჩახავა	Theatre	1921	2009	—	Georgian actress
Tamar Chavchavadze	თამარ ჭავჭავაძე	Theatre	1896	1968	—	Georgian actress
Leon Chedia	ლეონ ჭედია	Theatre	1903	1990	—	Actor and director
Sergo Chelidze	სერგო ჭელიძე	Theatre	1908	1977	—	Actor and director
Mikheil Chiaureli	მიხეილ ჭიაურელი	Film	1894	1974	1948	Film director, screenwriter
Sofiko Chiaureli	სოფიკო ჭიაურელი	Theatre	1937	2008	—	Soviet and Georgian actress
Dodo Chichinadze	დოდო ჭიჭინაძე	Theatre	1924	2009	—	Georgian actress
Mikheil Chikhladze	მიხეილ ჩიხლაძე	Theatre	1902	1973	—	Actor
Archil Chkhartishvili	არჩილ ჩხარტიშვილი	Theatre	1905	1980	1968	Theater director
Nodar Chkheidze	ნოდარ ჩხეიძე	Film	1917	1982	—	Actor
Revaz Chkheidze	რევაზ ჩხეიძე	Film	1926	2015	1980	Film director
Temur Chkheidze	თემურ ჩხეიძე	Theatre	1943	2022	—	Georgian actor
Ramaz Chkhikvadze	რამაზ ჩხიკვაძე	Theatre	1928	2011	1981	Soviet and Georgian actor
Mirian Chkhikvishvili	მირიან ჩხიკვიშვილი	Music	1900	1980	—	Singer, conductor
Lamara Chkonia	ლამარა ჭყონია	Opera	1930	2024	1976	Soviet and Georgian opera singer, music teacher
Elene Chokheli	ელენე ჩოხელი	Theatre	1914	1991	—	Singer and actress
Giuli Chokhonelidze	გიული ჭოხონელიძე	Film	1929	2008	—	Soviet actor and film director
Mikheil Chubinidze	მიხეილ ჩუბინიძე	Theatre	1910	2006	1982	Georgian actor
Shalva Dadiani	შალვა დადიანი	Theatre	1874	1959	—	Georgian actor and writer
Giorgi Darakhvelidze	გიორგი დარახველიძე	Dancer	1914	1982	—	Choreographer
Giorgi Darispanashvili	გიორგი დარისპანაშვილი	Theatre	1905	1985	—	Georgian actor and director
Kote Daushvili	კონსტანტინე დაუშვილი	Theatre	1909	1980	—	Soviet actor
Mariam Davitashvili	მარიამ დავითაშვილი	Theatre	1907	1975	—	Actress
Nino Davitashvili	ნინო დავითაშვილი	Theatre	1882	1958	—	Actress
Odysseas Dimitriadis	ოდისევსი დიმიტრიადი	Music	1908	2005	1958	Georgian-born conductor
Konstantin Dobrzhinsky	კონსტანტინე დობჟინსკი	Theatre	1889	1966	—	Actor
Vasily Dolenko	ვასილ დოლენკო	Film	1902	1998	—	Georgian film editor and director
Olga Dolidze	ოლღა დოლიძე	Theatre	1904	1990	—	Actress
Siko Dolidze	სიმონ დოლიძე	Film	1903	1983	1965	Soviet film director
Elene Donauri	ელენე დონაური	Theatre	1890	1955	—	Georgian actress
Lia Eliava	ლია ელიავა	Theatre	1934	1998	—	Georgian actress
Leo Esakia	ლეო ესაკია	Film	1899	1969	—	Actor
Revaz Gabichvadze	რევაზ გაბიჩვაძე	Music	1913	1999	—	Composer
Mikheil Gagnidze	მიხეილ გაგნიძე	Theatre	1901	1968	—	Actor and director
Zinaida Gagoleva	ზინაიდა გაგლოევა	Theatre	1915	1987	—	Ossetian actress
Shalva Gambashidze	შალვა ღამბაშიძე	Theatre	1899	1955	—	Soviet actor
David Gamrekeli	დავით გამრეკელი	Opera	1911	1977	—	Georgian operatic baritone
Gogi Gegechkori	გიორგი გეგეჭკორი	Theatre	1923	2003	—	Soviet and Georgian actor
Evgenia Gelovani	ევგენია გელოვანი	Dance	1926	2004	—	Ballerina
Mikheil Gelovani	მიხეილ გელოვანი	Cinema	1893	1956	1950	Actor
Grigol Grigorashvili	გრიგოლ გრიგორაშვილი	Music	1905	1962	—	Singer
Vaso Godziashvili	ვასო გოძიაშვილი	Theatre	1905	1976	1958	Georgian actor
Marina Goglidze-Mdivani	მარინა მდივანი	Music	1936	—	—	Soviet Concert Pianist, Canadian Pedagogue
Lana Gogoberidze	ლანა ღოღობერიძე	Film	1928	—	—	Georgian film director and former member of parliament
Shalva Gogolashvili	შალვა გოგოლაშვილი	Film	1887	1972	—	Actor
Elena Gogoleva	ელენე გოგოლევა	Film	1900	1993	1949	Actress
Ivane Gokieli	ივანე გოკიელი	Music	1899	1972	—	Composer
Aleksandre Gomelauri	ალექსანდრე გომელაური	Theatre	1907	1966	—	Actor
Zakaria Gomelauri	ზაქარია გომელაური	Theatre	1890	1964	—	Actor
Archil Gomiashvili	არჩილ გომიაშვილი	Theatre	1926	2005	—	Soviet and Russian actor
Elisabed Gostenina	ელისაბედ გოსტენინა	Music	1904	1988	—	Singer
Leila Gotsiridze	ლეილა გოცირიძე	Music	1924	1988	—	Singer
Valerian Gunia	ვალერიან გუნია	Theatre	1862	1938	—	Soviet linguist, actor and librettist
Nikoloz Gvaradze	ნიკოლოზ გვარაძე	Theatre	1883	1960	—	Actor
Elene Gvaramadze	ელენე გვარამაძე	Theatre	1913	1991	—	Ballerina
Tamara Gverdtsiteli	თამარ გვერდწითელი	Music	1962	—	—	Georgian-Russian singer, actress and composer
Venera Hakobyan	Վեներա Հակոբյան	Theatre	1904	1988	—	Actor
Aleksandre Inashvili	ალექსანდრე ინაშვილი	Opera	1887	1958	1950	Singer
Otar Iosseliani	ოთარ იოსელიანი	Film	1934	2023	—	Georgian film director
Liana Isakadze	ლიანა ისაკაძე	Music	1946	2024	1988	Soviet and Georgian violinist, music educator, conductor
Leon Isetski	Լևոն Իսեցկի	Opera	1888	1946	—	Armenian opera singer
Medea Japaridze	მედეა ჯაფარიძე	Theatre	1923	1994	—	Soviet actor
Stepane Japaridze	სტეფანე ჯაფარიძე	Theatre	1902	1973	—	Actor
Marine Jashvili	მარინე იაშვილი	Music	1932	2012	—	Georgian violinist
Sonia Jatieva	სონია ჯატიევა	Theatre	1896	1980	—	Ossetian actress
Natalia Javakhishvili	ნატალია ჯავახიშვილი	Theatre	1882	1952	—	Actress
David Javrishvili	დავით ჯავრიშვილი	Dance	1894	1971	—	Ballet master
Imeda Kakhiani	იმედა კახიანი	Theatre	1937	—	—	Georgian actor
Jansug Kakhidze	ჯანსუღ კახიძე	Music	1936	2002	1985	Soviet and Georgian conductor
Mikhail Kalatozov	მიხეილ კალატოზიშვილი	Film	1903	1973	1969	Soviet film director and screenwriter
Giya Kancheli	გია ყანჩელი	Music	1935	2019	1988	Soviet and Georgian composer
Salome Kancheli	სალომე ყანჩელი	Film	1921	1985	—	Actress
Irakli Kandelaki	ირაკლი კანდელაკი	Film	1901	1970	—	Film maker
Leuarsan Kaslandzia	ლეუარსან კასლანძია	Theatre	1912	1996	—	Abkhazian actor
Makvala Kasrashvili	მაყვალა კასრაშვილი	Opera	1942	—	1986	Soviet and Russian opera singer (soprano)
Kakhi Kavsadze	კახი კავსაძე	Theatre	1935	2021	—	Soviet and Georgian actor
Vladimer Kavsadze	ვლადიმერ კავსაძე	Music	1886	1943	—	Singer
Archil Kereselidze	არჩილ კერესელიძე	Music	1912	1971	—	Soviet composer
Aram Khachaturian	არამ ხაჩატურიანი	Music	1903	1978	1954	Soviet Armenian composer
Nadezhda Kharadze	ნადეჟდა ხარაძე	Music	1912	1999	—	Singer
Shota Khazhalia	შოთა ხაჟალია	Theatre	1917	1991	—	Actor
Shalva Kherkheulidze	შალვა ხერხეულიძე	Film	1908	1993	—	Actor
Merab Khinikadze	მერაბ ხინიკაძე	Film	1912	1988	—	Actor
Akaki Khorava	აკაკი ხორავა	Theatre	1895	1972	1936	Georgian actor
Levan Khotivari	ლევან ხოტივარი	Film	1902	1980	—	Russian film director
Ipolite Khvichia	იპოლიტე ხვიჩია	Theatre	1910	1985	—	Georgian actor
Vakhtang Kikabidze	ბუბა კიკაბიძე	Film	1938	2023	—	Soviet and Georgian singer, actor, screenwriter, producer, and composer
Zurab Kikileishvili	ზურაბ კიკალეიშვილი	Film	1924	2005	—	Actor
Shota Kiknadze	შოთა კიკნაძე	Music	1920	1998	—	Singer
Iusup Kobaladze	იუსუფ კობალაძე	Theatre	1906	1985	—	Actor
Petre Koberidze	პეტრე კობახიძე	Theatre	1906	1963	—	Actor
Otar Koberidze	ოთარ კობერიძე	Film	1924	2015	—	Soviet actor, film director and screenwriter
Merab Kokochashvili	მერაბ კოკოჩაშვილი	Film	1935	—	—	Soviet actor and film director
Grigol Kostava	გრიგოლ კოსტავა	Theatre	1907	1979	—	Actor
Mikheil Kove	მიხეილ კოვე	Theatre	1914	?	—	Actor
Bartlome Kraveishvili	ბართლომე კრავეიშვილი	Music	1914	1970	—	Singer
Nikoloz Kumsiashvili	ნიკოლოზ ქუმსიაშვილი	Music	1892	1942	—	Singer
Vladimer Kuparadze	ვლადიმერ ყუფარაძე	Dance	1921	1981	—	Dancer
Gogutsa Kuprashvili	გოგუცა კუპრაშვილი	Theatre	1908	1983	—	Actress
Vasil Kushitashvili	ვასილ ყუშიტაშვილი	Theatre	1894	1962	—	Actor and director
Olga Kuznetsova	ოლგა კუზნეცოვა	Music	1928	?	—	Singer
Akaki Kvantaliani	აკაკი კვანტალიანი	Theatre	1907	1967	—	Actor
Mikheil Kvarelashvili	მიხეილ ყვარელაშვილი	Music	1906	1984	—	Singer
Zinaida Kverenchkhiladze	ზინაიდა კვერენჩხილაძე	Theatre	1932	2011	—	Soviet actor
Bidzina Kvernadze	ბიძინა კვერნაძე	Music	1928	2010	—	Soviet composer
Rezo Lagidze	რეზო ლაღიძე	Music	1921	1981	—	Georgian and Soviet composer
Nino Lapachi	ნინო ლაფაჩი	Theatre	1908	1992	—	Actress
Giga Lortkipanidze	გიგა ლორთქიფანიძე	Film	1927	2013	1979	Soviet actor and film director
Nino Lortkipanidze	ნინო ლორთქიფანიძე	Dance	1924	?		Dancer
Artem Lusinyan	არტემ ლუსინიანი	Theatre	1910	1963	—	Soviet Armenian actor
Edisher Maghalashvili	ედიშერ მაღალაშვილი	Theatre	1925	2005	—	Soviet actor
Kote Makharadze	კოტე მახარაძე	Theatre	1926	2002	—	Soviet and Georgian sports commentator, actor and drama teacher
Yadviga Maksimova	იადვიგა მაქსიმოვა	Theatre	1909	?	—	Actress
Dimitri Mamiev	დიმიტრი მამიევი	Theatre	1909	1983	—	Actor
Nodar Managadze	ნოდარ მანაგაძე	Film	1943	2006	—	Soviet actor and film director
Shota Managadze	შოთა მანაგაძე	Film	1903	1977	—	Soviet film director, screenwriter
Erosi Manjgaladze	ეროსი მანჯგალაძე	Film	1924	1982	—	Actor
Kote Marjanishvili	კოტე მარჯანიშვილი	Theatre	1872	1933	—	Russian theatre director
Nikolai Marshak	ნიკოლოზ მარშაკი	Theatre	1902	1962	—	Actor and director
Vakhtang Mataradze	ვახტანგ მატარაძე	Theatre	1908	1982	—	Actor
Dimitri Mchedlidze	დიმიტრი მჭედლიძე	Music	1904	1983	—	Singer
Ioseb Meburishvili	იოსებ მებურიშვილი	Theatre	1887	1975	—	Director
Vakhtang Megrelishvili	ვახტანგ მეგრელიშვილი	Theatre	1919	2004	—	Actor
Akaki Mgeladze	აკაკი მგელაძე	Theatre	1912	1995	—	Actor
Giorgi Mikeladze	გიორგი მიქელაძე	Theatre	1892	1974	—	Actor and director
Aleksandre Mirianashvili	ალექსანდრე მირიანაშვილი	Music	1915	1987	—	Composer
Didim Mirtskhulava	დიდიმ მირცხულავა	Music	1912	1997	—	Conductor
Konstantine Miupke	კონსტანტინე მიუფკე	Theatre	1903	1968	—	Actor
Marina Mkheidze	მარინა მხეიძე	Dance	1917	?	—	Dancer
Maryam Motchoryan	მარიამ მოჯორიანი	Theatre	1904	1972	—	Armenian actress
Shalva Mshvelidze	შალვა მშველიძე	Music	1904	1984	—	Soviet composer
Vano Muradeli	ვანო მურადელი	Music	1908	1970	1968	Composer and conductor
Andria Murusidze	ანდრია მურუსიძე	Theatre	1885	1962	—	Actor
Tengiz Mushkudiani	თენგიზ მუშკუდიანი	Music	1907	2023	—	Singer
Dimitri Mzhavia	დიმიტრი მჟავია	Theatre	1896	1965	—	Actor
Meri Nakashidze	მერი ნაკაშიძე	Music	1914	1986	—	Singer
Viktor Ninidze	ვიქტორ ნინიძე	Theatre	1888	1975	—	Actor
Viktor Ninidze	ვიქტორ ნინიძე	Theatre	1920	2001	—	Actor
Vakhtang Ninua	ვახტანგ ნინუა	Film	1916	1981	—	Actor
Giorgi Nutsubidze	გიორგი ნუცუბიძე	Theatre	1882	1961	—	Actor
Aleksandre Omiadze	ალექსანდრე ომიაძე	Film	1904	1972	—	Actor
Sharakh Pachalia	შარახ ფაჩალია	Theatre	1914	2000	1982	Russian actor
Akaki Pagava	აკაკი ფაღავა	Theatre	1887	1962	—	Director
Levon Paliashvili	ლევან ფალიაშვილი	Music	1895	1976	—	Composer and teacher
Vakhtang Paliashvili	ვახტანგ ფალიაშვილი	Music	1919	1980	—	Conductor
Zacharia Paliashvili	ზაქარია ფალიაშვილი	Music	1871	1933	—	Georgian composer
Konstantine Pipinashvili	კონსტანტინე პიპინაშვილი	Film	1912	1969	—	Director and screenwriter
Ivan Perestiani	ივანე პერესტიანი	Film	1870	1959	—	Soviet film director
Mavr Piasetski	მავრ პიასეცკი	Theatre	1912	1977	—	Actor
Gevorg Pirumyan	გევორგ ფირუმიანი (მსახიობი)	Theatre	1881	1954	—	Armenian actor
Shota Pirveli	შოთა პირველი	Theatre	1914	1986	—	Actor
Pavle Prangishvili	პავლე ფრანგიშვილი	Theatre	1897	1966	—	Actor
Nino Ramishvili	ნინო რამიშვილი	Ballet & dance	1910	2000	1963	Georgian ballet dancer and ballet master
David Rondeli	დავით რონდელი	Film	1904	1976	—	Georgian Soviet film director
Giorgi Sagaradze	გიორგი საღარაძე	Theatre	1906	1986	—	Russian actor
Guram Sagaradze	გურამ საღარაძე	Theatre	1929	2013	—	Georgian actor
Karlo Sakandelidze	კარლო საკანდელიძე	Theatre	1928	2010	—	Georgian actor
Tariel Sakvarelidze	ტარიელ საყვარელიძე	Film	1923	1993	—	Actor
Vakhtang Salaridze	ვახტანგ სალარიძე	Theatre	1911	2001	—	Singer and actor
Nikoloz Sanishvili	ნიკოლოზ სანიშვილი	Film	1902	1995	—	Screenwriter
Mako Saparova-Abashidze	მაკო საფაროვა-აბაშიძე	Theatre	1860	1940	—	Russian actor
Vano Sarajishvili	ვანო სარაჯიშვილი	Opera	1879	1924	—	Georgian opera singer
Ekaterine Satina	ეკატერინე სატინა	Theatre	1892	1974	—	Actress
Elza Shaginian	ელზა შაგინიანი	Theatre	1895	?	—	Actress
Ekaterina Shakirbaya	ეკატერინე შაკერბაია	Theatre	1905	1979	—	Actress
Giorgi Shavgulidze	გიორგი შავგულიძე	Theatre	1910	1959	—	Soviet actor
Serika Shekoyan	სერიკ შეკოიანი	Theatre	1924	2015	—	Georgian actor
Eldar Shengelaia	ელდარ შენგელაია	Film	1933	2025	1988	Soviet and Georgian film director, screenwriter
Giorgi Shengelaia	გიორგი შენგელაია	Film	1937	2020	—	Georgian film director
Irakli Sherazadishvili	ირაკლი შერაზადიშვილი	Theatre	1909	1980	—	Actor and director
Irakli Shushania	ირაკლი შუშანია	Opera	1927	1982	—	Singer
Daniel Slavin	დანიელ სლავინი	Film	1907	1979	—	Actor
Anatoly Smiranin	ანატოლი სმირანინი	Theatre	1892	1971	—	Actor
Ekaterine Sokhadze	ეკატერინე სოხაძე	Opera	1907	1984	—	Soviet opera singer
Sos Sosyan	სოს სოსიანი	Theatre	1928	2008	—	Armenian actor
Zurab Sotkilava	ზურაბ სოტკილავა	Opera	1937	2017	1979	Georgian opera singer
Emma Stepanyan	ემა სტეპანიანი	Theatre	1915	1989	—	Armenian actress
Iliko Sukhishvili	ილიკო სუხიშვილი	Ballet & dance	1907	1985	1958	Georgian dancer
Vakhtang Tablashvili	ვახტანგ ტაბლიაშვილი	Film	1913	2002	—	Director
Aleksandre Takaishvili	ალექსანდრე თაყაიშვილი	Theatre	1895	1958	—	Actor
Mariam Tarkhnishvili	მარიამ თარხნიშვილი	Music	1891	1969	—	Singer
Tamar Tarkhnishvili	თამარ თარხნიშვილი	Theatre	1912	2007	—	Actress
Sesilia Takaishvili	სესილია თაყაიშვილი	Theatre	1906	1984	1966	Georgian Soviet actress
Otar Taktakishvili	ოთარ თაქთაქიშვილი	Music	1924	1989	1974	Georgian composer
Tsisana Tatishvili	ცისანა ტატიშვილი	Opera	1937	2017	1979	Georgian opera singer and music educator
Marine Tbileli	მარინე თბილელი	Film	1920	2002	—	Actress
Georgy Tedeev	გიორგი თედეევი	Dance	1926	1996	—	Ossetian dancer and choreographer
Nunu Tetradze	ნუნუ თეთრაძე	Theatre	1911	1986	—	Actress
Grigol Tkabladze	გრიგოლ ტყაბლაძე	Theatre	1907	1980	—	Actor
Aleksandra Toidze	ალექსანდრა თოიძე	Theatre	1907	1985	—	Georgian Soviet actor
Givi Tokhadze	გივი თოხაძე	Theatre	1922	2010	—	Soviet and Georgian actor
David Toradze	დავით თორაძე	Music	1922	1983		Composer
Georgy Tovstonogov	გიორგი ტოვსტონოგოვი	Theatre	1915	1989	1957	Soviet theatre director
Yakov Tripolsky	იაკობ ტრიპოლსკი	Film	1918	1988	—	Actor
Dudukhana Tserodze	დუდუხანა წეროძე	Theatre	1918	2000	—	Soviet actress
Vera Tsignadze	ვერა წიგნაძე	Ballet & dance	1924	2016	—	Soviet ballet dancer
Sulkhan Tsintsadze	სულხან ცინცაძე	Music	1925	1991	1988	Georgian composer
Tamar Tsitsishvili	თამარ ციციშვილი	Theatre	1908	1988	—	Russian actor
Ioseb Tskhvirashvili	იოსებ ცხვირაშვილი	Theatre	1910	?	—	Actor
Nadezhda Tsomaya	ნადეჟდა ცომაია	Music	1904	1974	—	Singer
Alexandre Tsutsunava	ალექსანდრე წუწუნავა	Film	1881	1955	—	Georgian film director
Sesilia Tsutsunava	ცეცილია წუწუნავა	Theatre	1892	1956	—	Actress
Natela Tugushi	ნათელა ტუღუში	Music	1931	1995	—	Singer
Iosep Tumanishvili	იოსებ თუმანიშვილი	Theatre	1909	1981	—	Director
Mikheil Tumanishvili	მიხეილ თუმანიშვილი	Theatre	1921	1996	1981	Soviet theatre director
Lamara Turmanidze	ლამარა თურმანიძე	Theatre	1912	1986	—	Actor
Iona Tuskia	იონა ტუსკია	Music	1901	1963	—	Composer and teacher
Elvira Uzunyan	ელვირა უზუნიანი	Music	1934	2025	—	Armenian singer, actress
Nato Vachnadze	ნატო ვაჩნაძე	Film	1904	1953	—	Soviet actress
Akaki Vasadze	აკაკი ვასაძე	Theatre	1899	1978	1936	Russian actor
Mikheil Vashadze	მიხეილ ვაშაძე	Theatre	1908	1996	—	Actor
Grigol Venadze	გრიგოლ ვენაძე	Music	1896	1968	—	Singer
Anastasia Virsaladze	ანასტასია ვირსალაძე	Music	1883	1968	—	Pianist
Eliso Virsaladze	ელისო ვირსალაძე	Music	1942	—	1989	Georgian pianist
Eugene Vronsky	ევგენი ვრონსკი	Opera	1883	1942	—	Singer
Aleksandr Zagorsky	ალექსანდრე ზაგორსკი	Theatre	1884	1965	—	Actor
Bukhuti Zakariadze	ბუხუტი ზაქარიაძე	Theatre	1913	1988	—	Soviet Georgian actor
Sergo Zakariadze	სერგო ზაქარიაძე	Theatre	1909	1971	1958	Soviet actor
Yuza Zardalishvili	იუზა ზარდალიშვილი	Theatre	1883	1943	—	Georgian actor
Hasmik Zhamkochyan	ასმიკ ჟამკოჩიანი	Theatre	1924	2011	—	Armenian actress
Aleksandre Zhorzholiani	ალექსანდრე ჟორჟოლიანი	Theatre	1888	1969	—	Actor
Minadora Zukhba	მინადორა ზუხბა	Theatre	1909	1998	—	Abkhazian actress

== See also ==
- People's Artist of the USSR
- Georgian Soviet Socialist Republic
- Culture of Georgia
