= David Rondeli =

Georgian film director (1904–1976)

- დავით რონდელი
- Born: David Tsagareishvili; 11 April 1904; Kutaisi, Kutaisi Governorate, Russian Empire
- Died: 12 March 1976 (aged 71); Tbilisi, Georgian SSR, Soviet Union
- Occupations: Film director, screenwriter
- Years active: 1930–1974
- Children: Alexander Rondeli

David Evgenis dze Rondeli (Georgian: დავით რონდელი; born David Tsagareishvili; 11 April 1904 – 12 March 1976) was a Georgian film director and screenwriter. He directed several films at the Tbilisi film studio over more than four decades, including the acclaimed comedy Lost Paradise (1937), and was named a People's Artist of the Georgian SSR in 1961.

== Early life and career ==
Rondeli was born David Tsagareishvili on 11 April 1904 in Kutaisi, then part of the Kutaisi Governorate of the Russian Empire. He graduated from Tbilisi State University and from 1923 worked as a newspaper correspondent, later serving as chief editor of the journal Proletarian Literature.

In 1928 Rondeli entered the cinema, joining the Georgian state film studio (Goskinprom Gruzii, now Gruziya-Film) as head of its scenario department, then as an assistant director, and from 1930 as a director. He worked as both a director and a screenwriter.

== Films ==
In 1937 Rondeli directed Lost Paradise, a satire adapted from the stories of David Kldiashvili, which brought him wide recognition and has been described as one of the finest Georgian comedies of the 1930s. For the 1944 film Jurgha's Shield, co-directed with Siko Dolidze, the two received the Stalin Prize in 1950. In 1951 he directed Conquerors of the Peaks, the first colour film in Georgian cinema. His other films include Mamluqi (1958) and My Friend Nodar (1967).

In 1953–1954 Rondeli was chief editor of the collegium of the Georgian Ministry of Cinematography, and he also taught at the film school of the Tbilisi studio and at the Shota Rustaveli Theatre Institute.

== Awards and honours ==
- Honoured Art Worker of the Georgian SSR (1945)
- Stalin Prize, First Class (1950), for Jurgha's Shield
- People's Artist of the Georgian SSR (1961)
- Order of the Red Banner of Labour (1966)
- Two Orders of the Badge of Honour (1944, 1958)

== Personal life ==
Rondeli's son, Alexander Rondeli (1942–2015), was a prominent Georgian political scientist and diplomat. David Rondeli died in Tbilisi on 12 March 1976 and was buried at the Saburtalo Pantheon.
