= Dimitri Aleksidze =

Georgian theatre director (1910–1984)

- დიმიტრი ალექსიძე
- Born: 8 March 1910; Tiflis, Tiflis Governorate, Russian Empire
- Died: 4 December 1984 (aged 74); Tbilisi, Georgian SSR, Soviet Union
- Resting place: Didube Pantheon, Tbilisi
- Occupations: Theatre director, pedagogue
- Years active: 1935–1984

Dimitri "Dodo" Aleksandres dze Aleksidze (Georgian: დიმიტრი ალექსიძე; 8 March 1910 – 4 December 1984) was a Georgian theatre director and pedagogue. A leading figure of Soviet Georgian theatre who also worked extensively in Ukraine, he directed at the Rustaveli Theatre and the Marjanishvili Theatre in Tbilisi and at the Ivan Franko Theatre in Kyiv, and was named a People's Artist of the USSR in 1976.

== Early life and education ==
Aleksidze was born on 8 March 1910 in Tiflis, the son of the poet Mariam Tkemaladze-Aleksidze, known by the pen name "Marijani". In 1934 he graduated from the directing faculty of the State Institute of Theatre Arts (GITIS) in Moscow.

== Career ==
From 1935 Aleksidze was a staging director of the Rustaveli Theatre in Tbilisi, serving as its chief director from 1959 to 1964. His 1955 production of Sophocles' Oedipus Rex is regarded as a landmark of his career; among his other Rustaveli stagings were Shakespeare's Hamlet (1960) and Vazha-Pshavela's Bakhtrioni (1960).

From 1964 to 1970 he worked in Kyiv, where he became chief director of the Ivan Franko Theatre and also led the Lesya Ukrainka Russian Drama Theatre. For his Franko Theatre production of Oleksandr Korniychuk's Memory of the Heart, he received the Shevchenko State Prize of the Ukrainian SSR.

After returning to Georgia in 1970, Aleksidze served as chief director of the Marjanishvili Theatre until his death, where his productions included Schiller's Don Carlos (1970) and a staging of Mikheil Javakhishvili's Kvachi Kvachantiradze (1974). From 1974 to 1984 he was chairman of the Theatrical Society of Georgia. He died in 1984.

== Teaching ==
Aleksidze taught for decades at the Shota Rustaveli Theatre Institute in Tbilisi, where he headed the chair of directing and acting from 1939 to 1964 and again from 1970, and served as its rector in 1950–1951; from 1966 to 1970 he was also a professor at the theatre institute in Kyiv. A Doctor of Art Studies, his students included Ramaz Chkhikvadze, Kakhi Kavsadze, Robert Sturua and Temur Chkheidze.

== Awards and honours ==
- People's Artist of the Georgian SSR (1955)
- People's Artist of the Ukrainian SSR (1969)
- Shevchenko State Prize of the Ukrainian SSR (1971)
- People's Artist of the Abkhaz ASSR (1975)
- People's Artist of the USSR (1976)
- Shota Rustaveli State Prize of the Georgian SSR (1985, posthumous)
- Order of Lenin
- Two Orders of the Red Banner of Labour
- Order of Friendship of Peoples (1980)
- Order of the October Revolution

== Personal life ==
Aleksidze's son Giorgi Aleksidze was a noted choreographer, and his son Aleksandre was a literary scholar. Aleksidze died in Tbilisi on 4 December 1984 and was buried at the Didube Pantheon.
