= David Badridze =

Georgian operatic tenor (1899–1987)

- დავით ბადრიძე
- Born: 4 April 1899; Kutaisi, Kutaisi Governorate, Russian Empire
- Died: 26 January 1987 (aged 87); Moscow, Soviet Union
- Resting place: Troyekurovskoye Cemetery, Moscow
- Occupations: Operatic tenor, voice teacher
- Years active: 1923–1948

David "Datiko" Giorgis dze Badridze (Georgian: დავით ბადრიძე; 4 April 1899 – 26 January 1987) was a Georgian operatic tenor and voice teacher. A lyric tenor, he was a soloist of the Bolshoi Theatre in Moscow and was named a People's Artist of the Georgian SSR in 1943.

== Early life and education ==
Badridze was born on 4 April 1899 in Kutaisi, then part of the Kutaisi Governorate of the Russian Empire. He graduated from the medical faculty of Tbilisi State University in 1924 and from the Tbilisi State Conservatoire in 1926, where he studied in the class of Yevgeny Vronsky.

== Career ==
Badridze was a soloist of the Tbilisi Opera and Ballet Theatre from 1926 to 1934, making his debut as the Duke in Verdi's Rigoletto. After singing at the opera house in Sverdlovsk from 1934 to 1936, he returned to Tbilisi until 1944, and was then a soloist of the Bolshoi Theatre in Moscow from 1944 to 1948; from 1937 he was also a soloist of the USSR State Philharmonic. He left the stage in 1948.

His roles included Malkhaz in Paliashvili's Daisi; the Duke in Rigoletto and Alfredo in La traviata (Verdi); the title role in Gounod's Faust; Gérald in Delibes's Lakmé; Hoffmann in Offenbach's The Tales of Hoffmann; the title role in Massenet's Werther; and Lensky in Tchaikovsky's Eugene Onegin. He also appeared in the 1944 film Jurgha's Shield, directed by Siko Dolidze and David Rondeli, the roles for which he received the Stalin Prize.

== Teaching ==
From 1952 Badridze taught at the Gnessin Institute in Moscow. In 1957–1958 he was sent as a vocal pedagogue to North Korea and to North Vietnam, where he helped establish a national opera company and staged Tchaikovsky's Eugene Onegin, the first opera production in Vietnam. From 1962 he taught at the Tbilisi State Conservatoire, becoming a professor in 1972, and from 1967 to 1970 he worked at the Cairo Conservatory in Egypt to help develop national vocal training there.

== Awards and honours ==
- Honoured Artist of the Georgian SSR (1943)
- People's Artist of the Georgian SSR (1943)
- Stalin Prize, First Class (1950), for the film Jurgha's Shield

== Personal life ==
Badridze's son, Gia Badridze (1928–1999), was a Georgian actor, screenwriter and journalist. Badridze died in Moscow on 26 January 1987 and was buried at the Troyekurovskoye Cemetery.
