= Giorgi Asatiani =

Georgian documentary film director (1914–1977)

- გიორგი ასათიანი
- Born: 10 June 1914; Borzya, Russian Empire
- Died: 17 November 1977 (aged 63); Tbilisi, Georgian SSR, Soviet Union
- Resting place: Saburtalo Pantheon, Tbilisi
- Occupations: Documentary film director, cinematographer
- Years active: 1937–1977

Giorgi Iraklis dze Asatiani (Georgian: გიორგი ასათიანი; 10 June 1914 – 17 November 1977) was a Georgian documentary film director and cinematographer. Known especially for his travel and expedition documentaries, he was named a People's Artist of the USSR in 1967.

== Early life and career ==
Asatiani was born on 10 June 1914 in Borzya, in the Transbaikal region of the Russian Empire. In 1936 he graduated from the Leningrad Institute of Cinema Engineers and from 1937 worked in film.

During the Second World War he served as a front-line cameraman from 1943, and his footage was used in wartime documentaries such as The Capture of Novorossiysk (1943). After the war he worked as a documentary correspondent and director at the Georgian Film Studio, and from 1965 to 1977 was artistic director of the Georgian studio of documentary and popular-science films.

Asatiani directed many travel documentaries, among them Journey to Nepal (1959), Country of Ancient Culture (1963), In the Land of the Incas (1968) and At the Sources of the Nile (1972); for Country of Ancient Culture he received the Lomonosov Prize in 1964.

== Awards and honours ==
- People's Artist of the Georgian SSR (1961)
- People's Artist of the USSR (1967)
- Order of the Red Banner (1945)
- Order of the Patriotic War, 2nd class (1944)
- Order of the Red Banner of Labour (1964)
- Two Orders of the Red Star (1943, 1944)
- Lomonosov Prize (1964)

== Death ==
Asatiani died on 17 November 1977 and was buried at the Saburtalo Pantheon in Tbilisi.
