= Aleksandra Toidze =

Georgian actress (1907–1985)

- ალექსანდრა თოიძე
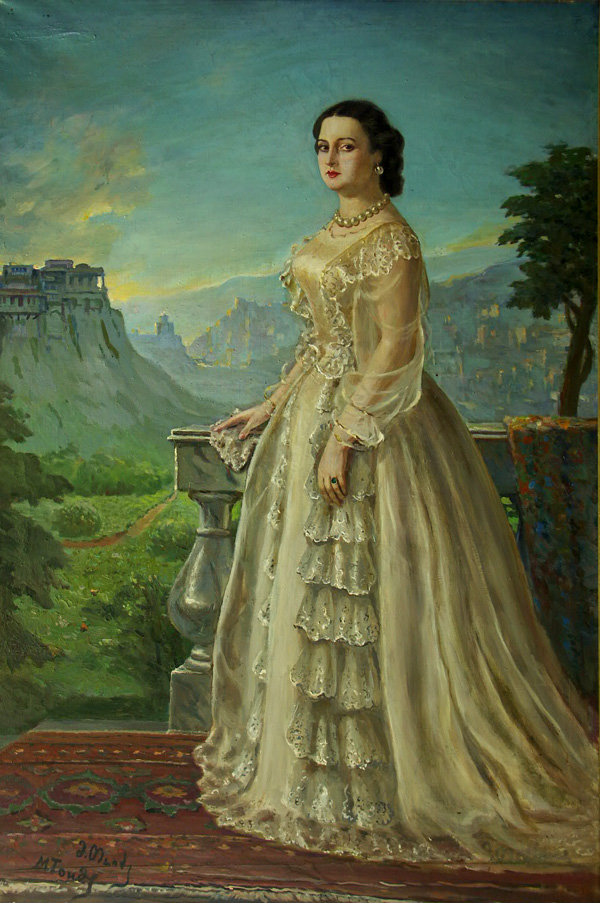
- Toidze as Ekaterine Chavchavadze, in a 1953 portrait by her father Mose Toidze
- Born: 11 March 1907; Tiflis, Tiflis Governorate, Russian Empire
- Died: 30 May 1985 (aged 78); Tbilisi, Georgian SSR, Soviet Union
- Resting place: Didube Pantheon, Tbilisi
- Occupation: Actress
- Years active: 1925–1964

Aleksandra "Shura" Toidze (Georgian: ალექსანდრა თოიძე; 11 March 1907 – 30 May 1985) was a Georgian stage and film actress. A longtime actress of the Rustaveli Theatre in Tbilisi, she was named a People's Artist of the Georgian SSR in 1950.

== Early life and education ==
Toidze was born on 11 March 1907 in Tiflis, the daughter of the painter Mose Toidze. After finishing a girls' gymnasium in Tbilisi in 1924, she studied at the ballet studio of Maria Perini and at a film-actors' studio.

== Career ==
Toidze appeared in films from the mid-1920s, making her breakthrough in the title role of Dina Dza-Dzu (1926). From 1937 to 1964 she was an actress of the Rustaveli Theatre, where she played more than fifty roles, among them Desdemona in Shakespeare's Othello, Cordelia in King Lear, and Ekaterine Chavchavadze in Mikheil Mrevlishvili's Nikoloz Baratashvili. Her later film appearances included a role in Keto and Kote (1948). From 1971 until her death she was director of the Mose Toidze House-Museum in Tbilisi.

== Awards and honours ==
- Honoured Artist of the Georgian SSR (1943)
- People's Artist of the Georgian SSR (1950)

== Personal life ==
Toidze came from a noted artistic family: her father was the painter Mose Toidze and her brother the poster artist Irakli Toidze. She was married to the literary scholar Vladimer Machavariani. She died in Tbilisi on 30 May 1985 and was buried at the Didube Pantheon.
