= Giga Lortkipanidze =

Georgian theatre and film director (1927–2013)

- გიგა ლორთქიფანიძე
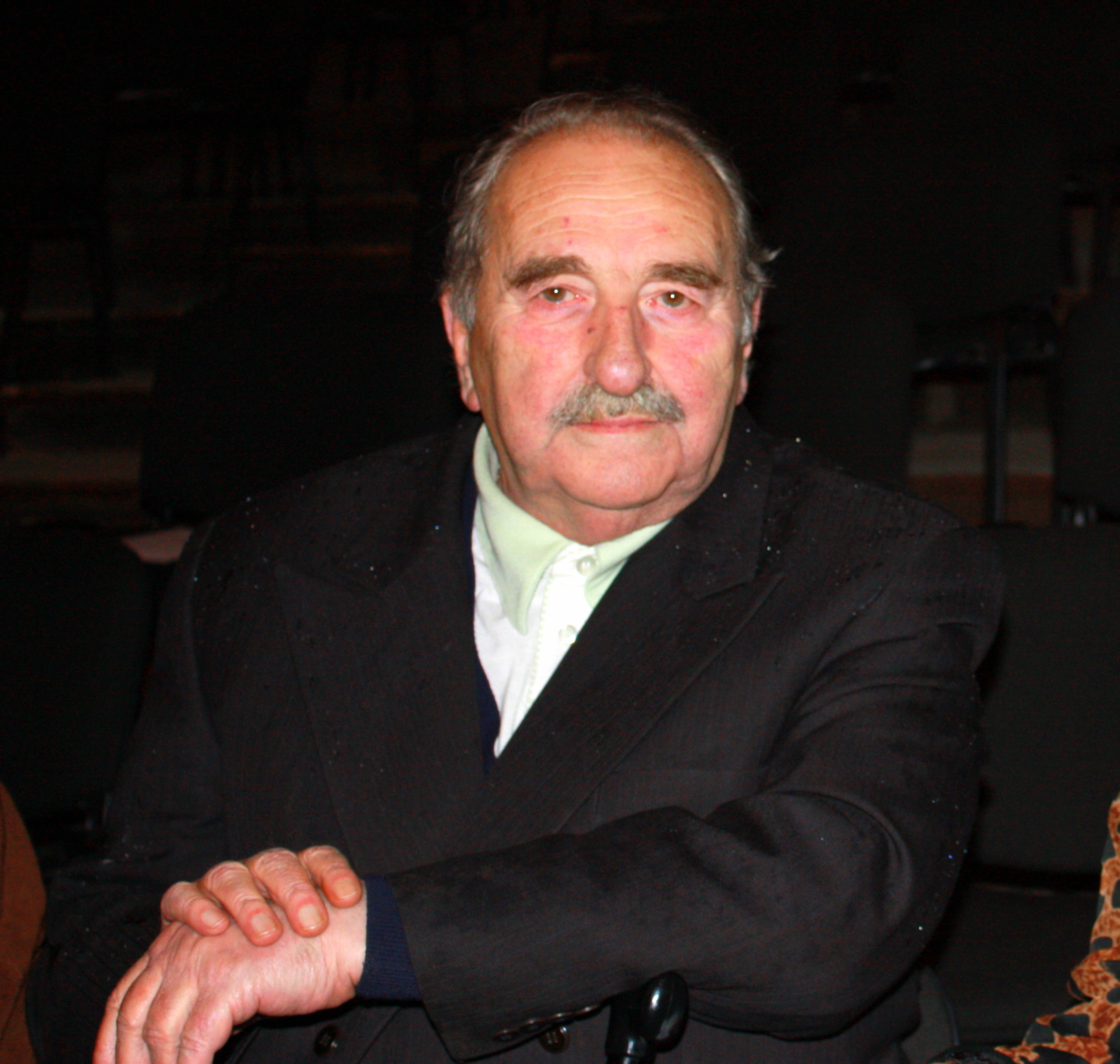
- Giga Lortkipanidze
- Born: Grigol Lortkipanidze; 19 October 1927; Tbilisi, Transcaucasian SFSR, Soviet Union
- Died: 13 June 2013 (aged 85); Tbilisi, Georgia
- Resting place: Didube Pantheon, Tbilisi
- Occupations: Theatre and film director
- Years active: 1950–2003
- Spouse: Ketevan Kiknadze

Grigol "Giga" Davitis dze Lortkipanidze (Georgian: გიგა ლორთქიფანიძე; 19 October 1927 – 13 June 2013) was a Georgian theatre and film director. A leading figure of Georgian theatre—long associated with the Marjanishvili Theatre—and the director of the acclaimed television series Data Tutashkhia, he was named a People's Artist of the USSR in 1979.

== Early life and education ==
Lortkipanidze was born on 19 October 1927 in Tbilisi. He studied at the Shota Rustaveli Theatre Institute in Tbilisi and in 1950 graduated from the directing faculty of the State Institute of Theatre Arts (GITIS) in Moscow.

== Career ==
Lortkipanidze directed at several of Georgia's principal theatres. He was for many years a director and artistic head of the Marjanishvili Theatre in Tbilisi, led the Lado Meskhishvili Theatre in Kutaisi and the Griboedov Russian Drama Theatre, and in 1967 founded the State Drama Theatre in Rustavi, which he led until 1976. He later served as artistic director of Georgian Television (1984–1986) and of the Vaso Abashidze Musical Theatre, and he also staged productions in Moscow, including at the Sovremennik.

In cinema, Lortkipanidze directed the seven-part television series Data Tutashkhia (1977, with Gizo Gabeskiria), based on the novel by Chabua Amirejibi, for which he received the USSR State Prize in 1981. His other films include The Land of Our Ancestors (1979, with Giuli Chokhonelidze) and White Flags (1990).

== Public life ==
Lortkipanidze was rector of the Shota Rustaveli Theatre and Film University in 1999–2000 and, from 1985, chairman of the Union of Theatre Workers of Georgia. He was a member of the Parliament of Georgia in the 1990s and was made an honorary citizen of Tbilisi in 1996.

== Awards and honours ==
- People's Artist of the Georgian SSR (1970)
- People's Artist of the USSR (1979)
- USSR State Prize (1981), for the television series Data Tutashkhia
- Shota Rustaveli State Prize of the Georgian SSR (1985)
- State Prize of Georgia (1995)
- Order of Honour (1996)
- Order of the Red Banner of Labour
- Order of the Badge of Honour (1958)

== Personal life ==
Lortkipanidze was married to the actress Ketevan Kiknadze; his sister was the historian Marika Lortkipanidze. He died in Tbilisi on 13 June 2013 and was buried at the Didube Pantheon.
