= Mikheil Chubinidze =

Georgian actor (1910–2006)

- მიხეილ ჩუბინიძე
- Born: 28 February 1910; Tiflis, Tiflis Governorate, Russian Empire
- Died: March 2006; Tbilisi, Georgia
- Resting place: Saburtalo Pantheon, Tbilisi
- Occupations: Actor, theatre director
- Years active: 1929–2006

Mikheil Dimitris dze Chubinidze (Georgian: მიხეილ დიმიტრის ძე ჩუბინიძე; 28 February 1910 – March 2006) was a Georgian stage and film actor and theatre director. A pupil of Kote Marjanishvili and a leading actor of the Georgian theatre in Sukhumi, he was named a People's Artist of the USSR in 1982.

== Career ==
Chubinidze began his stage career in 1929 and worked in the 1930s at theatres in Chiatura, Gori and elsewhere. From 1940 he was an actor of the Georgian company of the State Drama Theatre in Sukhumi, where he made his debut in the major role of Giorgi Saakadze in Sandro Shanshiashvili's Uncrowned Kings.

Among his stage roles were the title role in Aleksandre Kazbegi's Khevisberi Gocha, the President in Schiller's Intrigue and Love, the title role in Shakespeare's Othello, and the title role in Sophocles' Oedipus Rex. He also worked as a theatre director. In cinema, he played Nugzar Eristavi in the film Khevisberi Gocha (1964).

== Awards and honours ==
- Honoured Artist of the Georgian SSR (1946)
- People's Artist of the Abkhaz ASSR
- People's Artist of the Georgian SSR (1958)
- People's Artist of the USSR (1982)
- Order of Honour (1998)

== Death ==
Chubinidze died in Tbilisi in March 2006, aged 96, and was buried at the Saburtalo Pantheon.
