= Mako Saparova-Abashidze =

Georgian actress (1860–1940)

- მაკო საფაროვა-აბაშიძე
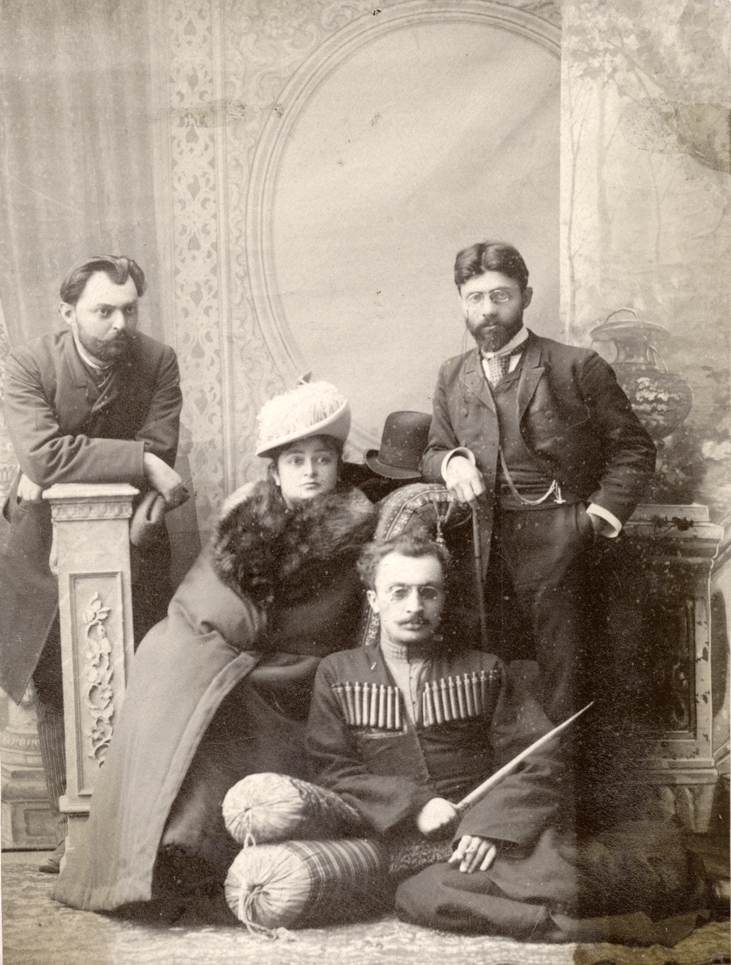
- Mako Saparova-Abashidze
- Born: Mariam Saparova; 18 February 1860; Telavi, Tiflis Governorate, Russian Empire
- Died: 25 May 1940 (aged 80); Tbilisi, Georgian SSR, Soviet Union
- Occupations: Actress, translator
- Years active: 1878–1923
- Spouse: Vaso Abashidze

Mariam "Mako" Saparova-Abashidze (Georgian: მაკო საფაროვა-აბაშიძე; 18 February 1860 – 25 May 1940) was a Georgian stage actress. One of the founders of the first Georgian professional theatre company, she was a leading actress of the Georgian stage for several decades and was named a People's Artist of the Georgian SSR in 1925.

== Early life ==
Saparova was born on 18 February 1860 in Telavi, in eastern Georgia, into an impoverished noble family. Her family's home was a gathering place for Georgian writers, among them Ilia Chavchavadze and Akaki Tsereteli, and it was at Tsereteli's encouragement that she went on the stage.

== Career ==
Saparova-Abashidze made her stage debut in 1878 and in 1879 became a founding member of the first permanent Georgian professional theatre company, established with the support of Ilia Chavchavadze and Akaki Tsereteli. Over her long career she played a wide range of roles, including Ophelia in Shakespeare's Hamlet, Liza in Griboedov's Woe from Wit, and Maria Antonovna in Gogol's The Government Inspector. She also translated Russian and French plays into Georgian and worked for a time as a theatre manager. Her last stage appearance was in 1923, at the Rustaveli Theatre.

== Personal life ==
Saparova-Abashidze was married to the actor Vaso Abashidze; their daughter, Anastasia "Taso" Abashidze, was also a noted actress. She died in Tbilisi on 25 May 1940 and was buried at the Vake Cemetery.
