= Ekaterine Sokhadze =

Georgian opera singer (1907–1984)

- ეკატერინე სოხაძე
- Born: 16 March 1907; Kutaisi, Kutaisi Governorate, Russian Empire
- Died: 22 May 1984 (aged 77)
- Occupation: Opera singer
- Years active: 1930–1953

Ekaterine Sokhadze (Georgian: ეკატერინე სოხაძე; 16 March 1907 – 22 May 1984) was a Georgian opera singer (lyric soprano). A longtime soloist of the Tbilisi Opera and Ballet Theatre, she was named a People's Artist of the Georgian SSR and was a Stalin Prize laureate.

== Career ==
Sokhadze was born on 16 March 1907 in Kutaisi. After studying music there, she graduated in 1930 from the Tbilisi State Conservatoire, in the class of Olga Bakhutashvili-Shulgina. That same year she joined the Tbilisi Opera and Ballet Theatre as a soloist, making her debut as Marguerite in Gounod's Faust, and she remained with the company until 1953. She was also twice invited as a guest soloist to the Bolshoi Theatre in Moscow.

Her repertoire included Eteri and Maro in Zacharia Paliashvili's Abesalom da Eteri and Daisi, Micaëla in Bizet's Carmen, Desdemona in Verdi's Otello, Tatiana in Tchaikovsky's Eugene Onegin, Cio-Cio-San in Puccini's Madama Butterfly, and Nestan-Darejan in Shalva Mshvelidze's The Legend of Tariel.

She died in 1984.

== Awards and honours ==
- Honoured Artist of the Georgian SSR (1936)
- Order of the Red Banner of Labour (1937)
- People's Artist of the Georgian SSR (1941)
- Order of Lenin (1946)
- State Stalin Prize, 2nd class (1947)
