= Keti Khitiri =

Georgian actress (born 1982)

Keti khitiri
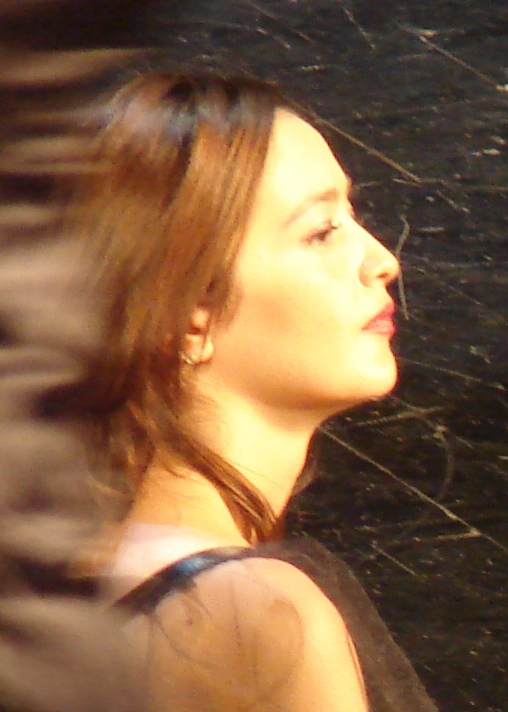
- Portrait of Georgian actress Keti Khitiri
- Born: Ketevan (Keti) Khitiri; May 20, 1982 (age 44); Tbilisi, Georgia, U.S.S.R.
- Occupation: Actress

Ketevan (Keti) Khitiri (Georgian: ქეთევან (ქეთი) ხიტირი) (born May 20, 1982, in Tbilisi) is a Georgian actress. She is based at the Shota Rustaveli Dramatic Theater in Tbilisi since 2005.

== Biography ==
Ketevan (Keti) Khitiri was born in Tbilisi, (Georgia). In 1999 she graduated from Tbilisi First Experimental Public School. The same year she was admitted to the Drama Faculty of the Theatre and Film Georgian State University. Her talent was already noticed and appreciated when she still was a student: in 2002 Ketevan Khitiri has been awarded the prize of "The Best Actress of the Year" for her interpretation of Mary Warren in Arthur Miller's play The Crucible, dedicated to the Salem witch trials and directed by Dimitri Khvtisiashvili.

In 2003 Keti graduated from the Theatre and Film Georgian State University. In 2005 she became an actress of the most celebrated Georgian academic theatre: Shota Rustaveli Dramatic Theater. The same year the Georgian Theatrical Society awarded to Keti Khitiri another prestigious prize - the distinction "The Best Actress of the Year" - for the interpretation of Kato in David Khvtisiashvili's production of Lali Roseba's "Premiere".

In the ongoing repertoire of the Shota Rustaveli Dramatic Theater Keti Khitiri is starring in several productions. It is noteworthy to emphasize that her artistic range is impressively wide, encompassing different genres. The roles interpreted by her are of sharply different character. In particular, her success and popularity is related with the memorable character of Karojna, played by Keti Khitiri in Robert Sturua's and Zaza Papuashvili's production of the "Misfortune of Darispan" by David Kldiashvili's classic play.

== Theatre roles ==
- Manina - Otar Chialdze's "Red Shoes of Tsate", director: Giga Lortkipanidze - 2006
- Karojna - David Kldiashvili's "Misfortune of Darispan", directors: Robert Sturua and Zaza Papuashvili - 2006
- Anano – "Soulful Creatures" by Lasha Bugadze, director: David Sakvarelidze – 2007
- Baia – Archil Sulakauri's ”Salamura”, director: Robert Sturua – 2007
- Keti – George Mgeladze's "Say Cheese", director: George Mgeladze – 2009
- Charlotte Sowerberry – Lionel Bart's "Oliver!", director: David Sakvarelidze – 2012
- Lulu (Anna) – Samuel Beckett's "First Love", director: Nikoloz Heine-Shvelidze – 2013

== Film roles ==
- "Good Lord, Why... Ungrateful" – director: Giga Lortkipanidze - 2003
