= Guram Sagaradze =

Guram Sagaradze may refer to:

- Guram Sagaradze (actor) (1929–2013), Georgian actor
- Guram Sagaradze (wrestler) (born 1939), Georgian wrestler
