= Akaki Vasadze =

Georgian actor and theatre director (1899–1978)

- აკაკი ვასაძე
- Born: 6 August 1899; Kutaisi, Kutaisi Governorate, Russian Empire
- Died: 23 March 1978 (aged 78); Tbilisi, Georgian SSR, Soviet Union
- Resting place: Didube Pantheon, Tbilisi
- Occupations: Actor, theatre director
- Years active: 1916–1978

Akaki Aleksis dze Vasadze (Georgian: აკაკი ალექსის ძე ვასაძე; 6 August 1899 – 23 March 1978) was a Georgian stage actor, theatre director and acting teacher. A leading actor of the Rustaveli Theatre in Tbilisi, where he also served as artistic director, he was named a People's Artist of the USSR in 1936 and was a three-time recipient of the Stalin Prize. He also appeared in films from the 1920s onward.

== Early life ==
Vasadze was born on 6 August 1899 in Kutaisi, then part of the Kutaisi Governorate of the Russian Empire. He began working in the theatre in Kutaisi in 1916, and in 1920 graduated from the Tbilisi drama studio of Giorgi Jabadari.

== Theatre career ==
From 1920 to 1958 Vasadze was an actor of the Rustaveli Theatre in Tbilisi, and from 1935 to 1955 he was also its artistic director. He subsequently served as artistic director of the Lado Meskhishvili Theatre in Kutaisi from 1958 to 1968, and from 1969 worked as an actor and director at the State Drama Theatre in Rustavi. He worked as a stage director from 1926.

Among his stage roles were Mengo in Lope de Vega's Fuenteovejuna, Franz Moor in Schiller's The Robbers, Iago in Shakespeare's Othello, and the title role in King Lear. Several of his performances and productions were honoured with State (Stalin) Prizes, including the title role in Kombrig Kikvidze (1942), Vasily Shuisky in The Great Sovereign (1946), and his staging of Sunken Stones (1951).

== Film ==
Vasadze appeared in films from 1923. His screen roles included Shah Abbas in Mikheil Chiaureli's Giorgi Saakadze (1943), a village elder in Tengiz Abuladze's Magdana's Donkey (1955), and Farsman the Persian in The Right Hand of the Grand Master (1970).

== Teaching ==
Vasadze taught acting from 1926, initially at the drama studio attached to the Rustaveli Theatre and, from 1939, at the Shota Rustaveli State Theatre Institute in Tbilisi, where he became a professor in 1947.

== Awards and honours ==
- People's Artist of the Georgian SSR (15 June 1934)
- People's Artist of the USSR (6 September 1936)
- Stalin Prize (1942, 1946, and 1951)
- Shota Rustaveli State Prize of the Georgian SSR (1975)
- Two Orders of Lenin (24 February 1946, 10 November 1950)
- Two Order of the Red Banner of Labour (22 March 1936 and 17 April 1958)

== Death and legacy ==
Vasadze died in Tbilisi on 23 March 1978 and was buried at the Didube Pantheon. A house-museum dedicated to him is located in Tbilisi.
