= Giuli Chokhonelidze =

Georgian actor (1929–2008)

- გიული ჭოხონელიძე
- Chokhonelidze as Pyotr Bagration
- Born: 10 April 1929; Tbilisi, Transcaucasian SFSR, Soviet Union
- Died: 24 December 2008 (aged 79); Tbilisi, Georgia
- Occupations: Actor, film director, screenwriter
- Years active: 1953–2001

Giuli Iasonis dze Chokhonelidze (Georgian: გიული ჭოხონელიძე; 10 April 1929 – 24 December 2008) was a Georgian stage and film actor, film director and screenwriter. He is best known for playing General Pyotr Bagration in Sergei Bondarchuk's film War and Peace, and was named a People's Artist of the Georgian SSR in 1983.

== Early life and education ==
Chokhonelidze was born on 10 April 1929 in Tbilisi. He graduated from the Shota Rustaveli Theatre Institute in Tbilisi in 1951 and then spent a year at the Gerasimov Institute of Cinematography (VGIK) in Moscow, in the workshop of Sergei Gerasimov.

== Career ==
From 1953 to 1958 Chokhonelidze was an actor at the Marjanishvili Theatre in Tbilisi, and from 1958 he worked in cinema. One of his early notable screen roles was Ibrahim in Fatima (1958).

His best-known role was General Pyotr Bagration in Sergei Bondarchuk's film epic War and Peace (1965–1967), which won the Academy Award for Best Foreign Language Film. He returned to the same historical figure in 1985 as the director, screenwriter and star of the film Bagrationi.

As a director, Chokhonelidze also made Kochora (1967), Spring Evening (1972), The Land of the Ancestors (1979), Spiral (1990) and Antimoz Iverieli (2001).

== Awards and honours ==
- Honoured Artist of the Georgian SSR (1961)
- People's Artist of the Georgian SSR (1983)
- Order of Honour (1999)

== Death ==
Chokhonelidze died in Tbilisi on 24 December 2008.
