= Dori Amirbekyan =

Armenian actor (1905–1983)

- Դորի Ամիրբեկյան
- Dori Amirbekyan
- Born: Artashes Beglari Amirbekyan; 8 May 1905; Tiflis, Tiflis Governorate, Russian Empire
- Died: 25 January 1983 (aged 77); Tbilisi, Georgian SSR, Soviet Union
- Occupation: Actor
- Years active: 1929–1983

Artashes Beglari Amirbekyan (Armenian: Արտաշես Ամիրբեկյան; Georgian: არტაშეს ამირბეკიანი; 8 May 1905 – 25 January 1983), known professionally as Dori Amirbekyan, was an Armenian actor. For many years the leading actor of the Armenian theatre in Tbilisi, he was named a People's Artist of the Georgian SSR in 1958 and a People's Artist of the Armenian SSR in 1964.

== Early life ==
Amirbekyan was born on 8 May 1905 in Tiflis. After completing his schooling in Tbilisi in the 1920s, he trained in the Armenian section of a Proletkult theatre studio.

== Career ==
Amirbekyan made his stage debut in 1929 with the Armenian company of the theatre in Sukhumi. He then acted at the Tbilisi Armenian Drama Theatre (1929–1932) and the Maxim Gorky Workers' Theatre in Yerevan (1932–1936), and from 1936 he was an actor of the Tbilisi Armenian Drama Theatre (now the Petros Adamian Tbilisi State Armenian Drama Theatre), where he became the leading actor.

Over his career he played more than 200 roles, among them Arbenin in Lermontov's Masquerade, Iago in Shakespeare's Othello, Franz Moor in Schiller's The Robbers, and various roles in Sundukyan's Pepo and Khatabala. He also wrote short fiction and was a noted master of artistic recitation. In cinema he appeared in Gikor (1934) and Granada (1969).

He died in January 1983.

== Awards and honours ==
- Honoured Artist of the Georgian SSR (1947)
- People's Artist of the Georgian SSR (1958)
- People's Artist of the Armenian SSR (1964)

== Personal life ==
Amirbekyan's brother, Aram Amirbekyan, was also an actor. He died in Tbilisi on 25 January 1983.
