= Order of Queen Tamara (2009) =

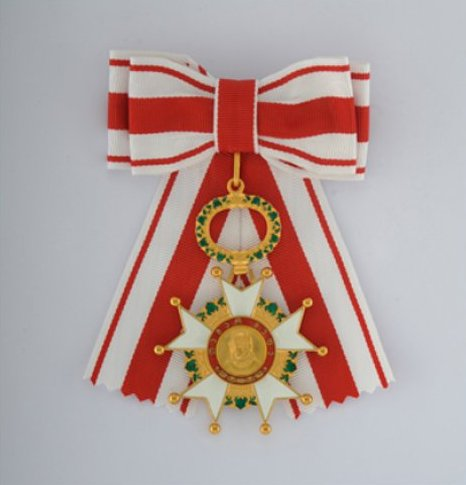

Awarded by Georgia
- Type: Single grade order
- Established: 31 July 2009
- Ribbon bar

The Order of Queen Tamara (თამარ მეფის ორდენი), a state award of Georgia, was established by the decision of the Parliament of Georgia № 1553 of July 31, 2009, to award only female representatives for outstanding services to the people and the homeland.

The Order of Queen Tamara is awarded with a cash prize of 4,000 lari.

== Recipients ==
- Lamara Chkonia, soprano (2011)
- Eka Kvesitadze (2013)
- Maya Asathiani, Georgian TV presenter (2013)
- Nana Zhorzholiani, Georgian TV presenter and journalist (2013)
- Inga Grigolia (2013)
- Nino Shubladze (2013)
- Khatia Buniatishvili (2013)
- Kristijna Ojuland, Estonian statesman and politician, Minister of Foreign Affairs from 2002 to 2005 (2013)
- Irina Yenukidze, public figure (2015).
- Medea Amiranashvili, opera singer (2021).

== See also ==
- Orders, decorations, and medals of Georgia
- Order of Queen Tamara (1918)
