= Victor Dolidze (composer) =

Georgian classical composer

Victor Isidores dze Dolidze
- ვიქტორ ისიდორეს ძე დოლიძე
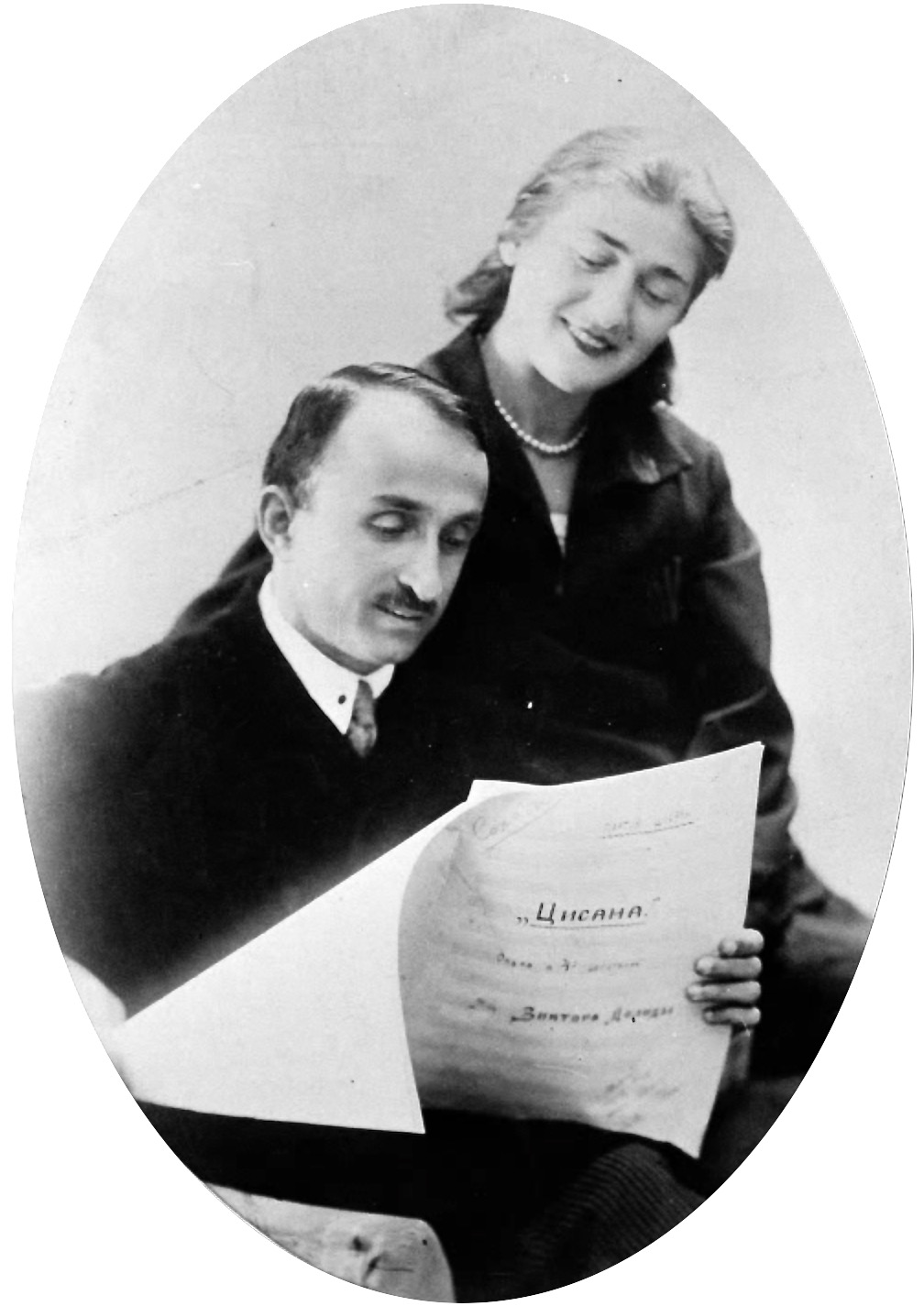
- Victor Dolidze posing with his wife and one of his scores in 1928
- Born: July 30, 1890; Ozurgeti, Kutais Governorate, Russian Empire
- Died: May 24, 1933 (aged 42); Tiflis
- Burial place: Didube Pantheon
- Occupation: Composer

Victor Isidores dze Dolidze (Georgian: ვიქტორ ისიდორეს ძე დოლიძე, 30 July 1890 – 24 May 1933) was a Georgian classical composer.

Practically unknown in the West, in his home country Dolidze is best remembered for his opera Keto and Kote, which premiered in 1919 during the First Republic. The composition, which remains popular to this day, follows the story of forbidden love between an impoverished prince and a wealthy commoner's daughter.

== Biography ==
Victor Dolidze was born on 30 July 1890 in the city of Ozurgeti, Kutais Governorate, in what is now Georgia, then part of the Russian Empire. He came from a poor peasant family.

In 1902 Dolidze's family moved to Tiflis, where entered a commercial school. In 1910, he won his first prize at a local mandolin contest.

After his high-school graduation in Georgia, he attended the Kiev Commercial Institute, and concurrently began to work in a music school for violin and composition. In 1917 he graduated from college and returned to Georgia and dedicated himself to music full time.

Victor Dolidze is the author of several operas, including the first Georgian opera buffa Keto and Kote, with his own libretto based on the comedy Khanuma by Avksenty Tsagareli.

Following the forced absorption of Georgia into the Soviet Union, some of Dolidze's later compositions faced scrutiny from Soviet censors. For example, Dolidze's lesser known opera, "Leila", was removed from repertory because one of its main characters was a Georgian monarch, which the Soviet authorities feared would encourage "monarchist sentiments".

Victor Dolidze died on 24 May 1933 in Tiflis and is buried at the Didube Pantheon.

== See also ==
- Heraclius Djabadary
- Zacharia Paliashvili
- Dimitri Arakishvili
