= Vera cemetery =

Cemetery in Tbilisi

- ვერის სასაფლაო, Վերայի գերեզմանատուն
- Interactive map of Vera cemetery

Details
- Location: Tbilisi
- Country: Georgia
- Coordinates: 41°42′08″N 44°46′43″E

Vera cemetery (Georgian: ვერის სასაფლაო, Armenian: Վերայի գերեզմանատուն) is cemetery in Vera district in Tbilisi, Georgia.

== History ==
The cemetery in Tbilisi Vera district was founded in 1836. In 1844 an Armenian church, Holy Cross (Surb Khach), was built inside the cemetery with David Tamashev's financial support. Later, the territory of the cemetery was expanded. Many famous Armenians of Tiflis were buried in the cemetery, including General Yeremia Artsuni, the first mayor of Tiflis; Harutyun Tumanyan, writer and teacher; landowner Natalia Skhhoyan; the businessman, industrialist and tobacco manufacturer Mikhail Bozarchyants; linguist, educator and armenologist Shahan Jrpetyan; the first zincographer of Tiflis Sarkis Soghomonyan; architect Gavril Ter-Mikelov; doctor Nikoghayos Khudadyan, etc.

== Georganisation ==
In 1992, with coming to power of Zviad Gamsakhurdia, the cemetery was vandalized. Gamsakhurdia followers began to destroy the cemetery. During the reconstruction of the church of the Holy Cross (Surb Khach) on the initiative of Georgian composer Nodar Gigauri, it was renamed the Church of Saint Pantaleon and turned into a Georgian Orthodox church. Tombstones inside the church, under which were stored the urn with the ashes of the dead, were covered with Turkish tiles. In the cemetery, space for new graves for Georgians were created by destroying the graves of Armenian burials.

The cemetery of Vera was known with its familial tombs: Ananovs, Yenikolopovs, Tsurinovs, Kamoyans, Babanasovs, Avan Yuzbashyans, Argutyans, etc. Today, the graves of many famous Armenians are without tombstones.

== See also ==
- Armenians in Tbilisi
- List of cemeteries in Georgia (country)
