= List of cemeteries in Georgia (country) =

This is a list of cemeteries in Georgia.

- Didube Pantheon
- Khojivank Pantheon of Tbilisi
- Mtatsminda Pantheon
- Saburtalo Pantheon
- Vera cemetery

== See also ==
- Burials in Georgia (country)
