= Gevorg Pirumyan =

Armenian actor (1881–1954)

- Գևորգ Փիրումյան
- Born: 18 October 1881; Tiflis, Tiflis Governorate, Russian Empire
- Died: 10 November 1954 (aged 73); Tbilisi, Georgian SSR, Soviet Union
- Occupation: Actor
- Years active: 1898–1954

Gevorg Nikoghayosi Pirumyan (Armenian: Գևորգ Փիրումյան; Georgian: გევორგ ფირუმიანი; 18 October 1881 – 10 November 1954) was an Armenian actor. One of the founders of the Armenian state drama theatre in Tbilisi, he was named a People's Artist of the Georgian SSR in 1947.

== Career ==
Pirumyan was born on 18 October 1881 in Tiflis and studied at the Nersisian School there. He made his stage debut in 1898 and performed in the people's theatres of Tiflis, and between 1904 and 1918 organised and led Armenian–Georgian drama and operetta companies.

In 1921 he became one of the founders of the Armenian State Drama Theatre in Tbilisi (now the Petros Adamian Tbilisi State Armenian Drama Theatre), where he worked for the rest of his life, playing dramatic and character roles in both Armenian and Georgian. Among his roles were several parts in Sundukyan's Pepo and Khatabala, Shmaga in Ostrovsky's Guilty Without Guilt, and Luka in Gorky's The Lower Depths.

== Awards and honours ==
- People's Artist of the Georgian SSR (1947)
