= Marina Goglidze-Mdivani =

Georgian–Canadian pianist and educator (born 1936)

Marina Goglidze-Mdivani მარინა გოგლიძე-მდივანი
- Born: 6 October 1936 (age 89); Tbilisi, Georgian SSR, USSR
- Education: Tbilisi State Conservatoire; Moscow Conservatory
- Occupations: Pianist; educator
- Instrument: Piano
- Awards: People's Artist of the Georgian SSR, 1976

Marina Goglidze-Mdivani (Georgian: მარინა გოგლიძე-მდივანი; born 6 October 1936) is a Georgian–Canadian pianist and educator.

== Early life and education ==
Marina Goglidze-Mdivani was born on 6 October 1936 in Tbilisi, Georgian SSR (present-day Georgia) to Victor Goglidze, a chess player.

In 1955, Mdivani graduated from the Tbilisi State Conservatoire. The same year Mdivani enrolled at the Moscow Conservatory, where she studied under Jacob Milstein. Graduating in 1960, Mdivani continued her studies under Emil Gilels and completed her postgraduate studies in 1963.

== Career ==
In 1961, she participated in and won Le Premier Prix at the Concours International Marguerite Long-Jacques Тhibaud in Paris. In 1962, she competed in the Second International Tchaikovsky Competition, where she was awarded the 4th prize. The competition that year is known as one of the stiffest piano competitions in history.

Upon graduation, she commenced an eight-week tour of the United States, culminating on November 27, 1963, at Carnegie Hall in New York City. At that time Mdivani’s impresario was the renowned Sol Hurok. For the next twenty-five years, she was a principal soloist of the Moscow Philharmonic Society. Mdivani's career as orchestral soloist and recitalist took her throughout Europe, Russia and North and South America.

Mdivani has taught at institutions in Eastern Europe and the Middle East and has also served on the juries of international competitions.

In 1992 Mdivani joined the faculty of the Schulich School of Music of McGill University in Montreal. Throughout her career, Mdivani mastered a very large repertoire including approximately 40 concertos, a vast number of chamber works, and countless solo piano works. Often, her programs were unusual; for example, on January 24, 1986, in the Great Hall of the Moscow Conservatory, Mdivani performed all five piano concertos of Sergei Prokofiev in one concert. She has had a long and esteemed music career, performing in more than 3,000 recitals. In 1976, Mdivani was awarded the title of the People's Artist of the Georgian SSR.

== Personal life ==
Mdivani has lived in Montreal since 1992 with her family Ekaterina and Anna Mdivani.

== Premieres ==
Date	Venue	Composer	Composition	Orchestra	Conductor	Source
1966-03-13	Moscow	Sofia Gubaidulina	Chaconne			

== Repertoire ==
Concertos: Arensky – F minor; Bach – D minor; Beethoven – No. 1, 2, and 3; Brahms – No. 1, 2; Haydn – D Major, G Major; Liszt – No. 1, 2; Mendelssohn – G minor; Prokofiev – No. 1, 2, 3, 4, 5; Rachmaninoff – No. 1, 2, 3, 4, Rhapsody on a Theme of Paganini; Schumann – A minor; Shostakovich – No. 1; Taktakishvili – No. 1, 2, 4; Tchaikovsky – No. 1; Stravinsky – Concerto for Piano and Wind Instruments;

Solo repertoire: Works by Bach, Beethoven, Brahms, Busoni, Chopin, Debussy, Gubaidulina, Haydn, Hindemith, Kefadis, Liszt, Mendelssohn, Mussorgsky, Mozart, Ovchinnikov, Prokofiev, Rachmaninoff, Reger, Schnittke, Schubert, Schumann, Scriabin, Stravinsky, Taktakishvili, Tchaikovsky and many other composers.

== Partial discography ==
- Tchaikovsky Concerto N1 en si bemol mineur. Concerts Colonne Pierre Dervaux. 1962, Pathe Marconi
- Mussorgsky Les Tableaux D'Une Exposition, Mendelssohn Variations Serieuses. 1963, Pathe Marconi
- Weinberg, Schubert, Haydn. 1964, Melodiya
- Prokofiev Concerto N3, Conductor G.Rozhdestvensky, 1963, Melodiya
- Taktakishvili Concerto N1, Conductor Taktakishvili, 1968, Melodiya
- Ovchinnikov Chorus, Prelude & Fugue, 1962, Melodiya
