= Dodo Chichinadze =

Georgian actress

- Born: 28 December 1924; Kutaisi, Georgia
- Died: 3 November 2009 (aged 84); Tbilisi, Georgia
- Occupation: Actress
- Years active: 1946-2009

Dodo Chichinadze (Georgian: დოდო ჭიჭინაძე; 28 December 1924 – 3 November 2009) was a Georgian film and theater actress. She appeared in a number of Georgian and Soviet era films, including The Suspended Song, Bashi Achuki, The Cricket, and Davit Guramishvili. She was awarded the title People's Artist of the Georgian SSR in 1976.

Chichinadze appeared as a lead actress at the Kote Marjanishvili Drama Theatre in Tbilisi for approximately 10 years. The Tbilisi city government honored Chichinadze with a star bearing her name outside the Rustaveli Theatre in 2009.

== Death ==
Dodo Chichinadze died on 3 November 2009, aged 84, from undisclosed causes.
