= Kote Daushvili =

Georgian actor (1909–1980)

- კოტე დაუშვილი
- Born: Konstantine Daushvili; 19 March 1909; Baku, Russian Empire
- Died: 5 July 1980 (aged 71)
- Resting place: Tbilisi
- Occupation: Actor
- Years active: 1927–1980

Konstantine "Kote" Davidis dze Daushvili (Georgian: კონსტანტინე (კოტე) დავითის ძე დაუშვილი; 19 March 1909 – 5 July 1980) was a Georgian stage and film actor. One of the early figures of Georgian cinema, he appeared in more than forty films over five decades and was named a People's Artist of the Georgian SSR in 1958.

== Early life and stage career ==
Daushvili was born on 19 March 1909 in Baku, in the Russian Empire. He began his stage career in 1927, working in the late 1920s at the Red Army Theatre in Tbilisi and, from around 1930, at the Kote Marjanishvili State Theatre, where he became one of the company's leading actors. He also performed at the Georgian theatre in Baku in the mid-1930s.

His stage roles included Knurov in Alexander Ostrovsky's Without a Dowry and Gela in a stage adaptation of Alexander Kazbegi's The Patricide.

== Film career ==
Daushvili appeared in films from 1931 and is regarded as one of the figures who stood at the origins of Georgian cinema. Among his notable screen roles were Tripili in Giorgi Saakadze (1942), Bodokia in The Right Hand of the Grand Master (1970), and Tsitsikore in Tengiz Abuladze's The Wishing Tree (1976). He also appeared in Georgiy Daneliya's Mimino (1977).

== Awards and honours ==
- Honoured Artist of the Georgian SSR (1946)
- Order of the Badge of Honour (1950)
- People's Artist of the Georgian SSR (1958)
- People's Artist of the Armenian SSR (1979)

== Death ==
Daushvili died on 5 July 1980 and was buried in Tbilisi.
