= Isaak Alikhanian =

Armenian actor and theatre director (1876–1946)

- ისააკ ალიხანიანი
- Isaak Alikhanian
- Born: 7 February 1876; Dusheti, Tiflis Governorate, Russian Empire
- Died: 15 March 1946 (aged 70); Tbilisi, Georgian SSR, Soviet Union
- Resting place: Khojivank Pantheon, Tbilisi
- Occupations: Actor, theatre director
- Years active: 1897–1946

Isaak Semyonovich Alikhanian (Armenian: Իսահակ Ալիխանյան; Georgian: ისააკ ალიხანიანი; 7 February 1876 – 15 March 1946) was an Armenian actor and theatre director. A leading figure of Armenian theatre in the Caucasus, he was named a People's Artist of the Armenian SSR in 1923 and a People's Artist of the Georgian SSR in 1941.

== Early life and education ==
Alikhanian was born on 7 February 1876 in Dusheti, then in the Tiflis Governorate of the Russian Empire. In 1896 he graduated from the Nersisian Armenian seminary in Tiflis.

== Career ==
Alikhanian began his stage career in 1897 and worked as an actor and director with Armenian theatre companies in Baku, Tiflis and Rostov-on-Don; from 1910 to 1921 he performed at the Armenian Drama Theatre in Tiflis. In 1921 he was one of the organisers of the First State Theatre of Armenia in Yerevan (now the Sundukyan Theatre), and from 1922 he worked at the Armenian theatre in Tbilisi (now the Petros Adamian Tbilisi State Armenian Drama Theatre) until the end of his life.

A follower of the psychological school of acting, he staged about 25 productions. Among his roles were Khlestakov in Gogol's The Government Inspector, Oswald in Ibsen's Ghosts, and Prince Myshkin in an adaptation of Dostoevsky's The Idiot.

== Awards and honours ==
- People's Artist of the Armenian SSR (1923)
- People's Artist of the Georgian SSR (1941)

== Personal life ==
Alikhanian was the father of the geneticist Sos Alikhanian. He died in Tbilisi on 15 March 1946 and was buried at the Khojivank Pantheon; a street in the Avlabari district of Tbilisi is named after him.
