= Leila Abashidze =

Georgian actress and film director

Leila Abashidze ლეილა აბაშიძე
- Born: Leila Mikhailovna Abashidze; August 1, 1929; Tbilisi, Georgian SSR, Soviet Union
- Died: April 8, 2018 (aged 88); Tbilisi, Georgia
- Occupation: Actress
- Years active: 1941–2018

Leila Abashidze (Georgian: ლეილა აბაშიძე; August 1, 1929 – April 8, 2018) was a Georgian actress, director and writer. She was awarded the titles Honored Artist of the Georgian SSR, People's Artist of the Georgian SSR, a recipient of Order of the Red Banner of Labour, as well as of awards of European and Asian film festivals, and has her own honorary star in front of Rustaveli cinema on Rustaveli Avenue in Tbilisi, Georgia. During her career she was widely considered as the "Mary Pickford of the USSR". She is one of the most popular Georgian and Soviet actresses.

== Biography ==
In 1951, Abashidze graduated from Rustaveli Theatrical Institute in Tbilisi, Georgia. She worked in the film studio "Georgian film" since 1940 and was a member of the cinematographer's union since 1958.

Abashidze made her screen debut as a child alongside Nato Vachnadze in Kajana (1941), but it was the hit romantic comedy The Dragonfly (1954) which made her popular throughout the Soviet Union and Europe. Then she appeared in another popular comedy The Scrapper (1956). After all that, she was associated with comedies, but this stereotype was destroyed after she starred in the critically acclaimed historical drama Maia Tskneteli (1959). She has had one of her biggest commercial successes with the drama Meeting Past (1966), for which, in 1968, she was awarded on Leningrad Film Festival as a Best Actress. Also she achieved wider fame after her appearance in the tragic drama Khevisberi Gocha (1964) and in one of the most popular romantic comedies Meeting in Mountains (1966).

She was the writer of Anticipation (1970), Silence of Towers (1978). She was the director, writer and leading actress of Tbilisi-Paris-Tbilisi (1980).

== Death ==
On April 8, 2018, Abashidze's health conditions got worse and she was sent to the hospital after suffering a stroke: she was pronounced dead on arrival, the cause of death was ruled as an ischemic stroke of the brain.

== Filmography ==
- Kajana (1941)
- Golden Path (1945)
- Cradle of Poet (1947)
- Keto and Kote (1948)
- Spring in Sakeni (1951)
- They Came from Mountains (1954)
- The Dragonfly (1954)
- Our Courtyard (1956)
- The Scrapper (1956)
- Where is Your Happiness Mzia? (1959)
- Maia Tskneteli (1959)
- I Shall Dance (1963)
- Khevisberi Gocha (1964)
- Wreck (1965)
- Meeting Past (1966)
- Meeting in Mountains (1966)
- Anticipation (1969)
- The Right Hand of the Grand Master (Episode One) (1969)
- The Right Hand of the Grand Master (Episode Two) (1970)
- Walking in Tbilisi (1976)
- Cinema (1977)
- Tbilisi-Paris-Tbilisi (1980)
- Commotion (1986)
- Zvaraki (1990)

== Dignities and awards ==
- Honored Artist of the Georgian SSR (1958)
- People's Artist of the Georgian SSR (1964) (Note: The Great Soviet Encyclopedia mistakenly says she was awarded the title People's Artist of the Georgian SSR in 1965; however, the decree awarding her the title was issued on 5 November 1964.)
- People's Artist of Chechnya-Ingushetia (1964)
- Order of the Red Banner of Labour (1960)
- Best actress at the Leningrad Film festival, 1968.
- Prize of 2 world festivals, Tokyo, 1997.
