= Medea Amiranashvili =

Georgian opera singer and teacher (1930–2023)

Medea Amiranashvili მედეა ამირანაშვილი
- Amiranashvili c. 1983

Background information
- Born: 10 October 1930; Shorapani, Transcaucasian SFSR, Soviet Union (present-day Georgia)
- Died: 2 December 2023 (aged 93) Tbilisi, Georgia
- Occupations: Operatic soprano; Academic teacher

Medea Petres asuli Amiranashvili (Note: Georgian: მედეა პეტრეს ასული ამირანაშვილი, romanized: Medea P’et’res asuli Amiranashvili) (10 October 1930 – 2 December 2023) was a Georgian operatic soprano and academic teacher. She appeared in leading roles of both Georgian and international operas, such as Revaz Lagidze's Lela, Verdi's Leonora in Il trovatore and Puccini's Madama Butterfly, credited with portraying them with "fierce inner expression". She was honoured as a People's Artist of the USSR in 1976 and the Order of Queen Tamara in 2021.

== Life and career ==
Medea Amiranashvili was born on 10 October 1930, in the village of Shorapani (now in Imereti, Georgia) (according to other sources, in Tbilisi) in a family of opera singers, USSR People's Artist and singer Peter Amiranashvili (1907–1976) and singer and teacher Nadezhda Tsomaia (1904–1973).

In 1953, she graduated from the Sarajishvili Tbilisi State Conservatoire, where she had studied under Alexander Inashvili and Olga Bakhutashvili-Shulgina, the latter of whom had also taught both her parents. From 1951 to 1954 she was a soloist of the opera studio at the Conservatory, and from 1954 onwards, soloist of Tbilisi Opera and Ballet Theatre.

=== Singer ===
She made her debut as a soloist in 1954 as Margarita in Gounod's Faust. Her roles included leading characters of a wide vocal range, such as lead roles in Zacharia Paliashvili's Abesalom da Eteri and Daisi (Twilight), the title role in Revaz Lagidze's Lela, Tatiana in Tchaikovsky's Eugene Onegin, Zemfira in Rachmaninoff's Aleko, Verdi's Leonora in Il trovatore, the title role of La traviata, and Desdemona in Otello, Elsa in Wagner's Lohengrin, Puccini's Mimi in La bohème and the title role of Madama Butterfly. She sang the main characters in three operatic films, Daisi, Abesalom da Eteri, and Christina. She was credited with portraying her characters with "fierce inner expression".

Amiranashvili also performed in concerts and recitals. She won the Glinka International Vocal Competition in 1960. She toured Poland, Czechoslovakia, Romania, East Germany, Hungary, Bulgaria, Australia, New Zealand, France and Canada. In 1970 in Japan she won a competition as best Cio-Cio-San.

=== Teaching and other functions ===
From 1967 to 1970, Amiranashvili was a deputy of the Supreme Soviet of the Georgian Soviet Socialist Republic, 7th Convocation. From 1972 onwards, she taught at the Conservatory of Tbilisi, from 1982 as a professor. She was artistic director of the Kutaisi opera house from 1991 to 2006.

=== Awards ===
Amiranashvili was an honorary citizen of Kutaisi. She was awarded the Order of the Badge of Honour, the Order of Friendship of Peoples, and the Medal "For Distinguished Labour". She was awarded People's Artist of the Georgian SSR in 1965, and People's Artist of the USSR in 1976. She was awarded the Order of Queen Tamara in 2021 by the President of Georgia, Salome Zourabichvili, for her special personal contribution to the development and popularization of Georgian opera" in 2021.

=== Personal life ===
Amiranashvili was married to the sculptor Otar Parulava; they had a daughter, Marine Parulava, who also became a singer.

Medea Amiranashvili died on 2 December 2023, at age 93. Georgia's Prime Minister, Irakli Garibashvili, sent a message of condolence, calling her "an unrivaled performer of Georgian and European opera and a dedicated champion of Georgian music". A civil funeral was held at the Tbilisi Opera and Ballet Theater, where Thea Tsulukiani, Minister of Culture, Sports and Youth, acknowledged the merits of the "legendary soprano".
