= Shalva Mshvelidze =

Georgian composer (1904–1984)

- შალვა მშველიძე
- Born: 28 May 1904; Tiflis, Tiflis Governorate, Russian Empire
- Died: 5 March 1984 (aged 79); Tbilisi, Georgian SSR, Soviet Union
- Resting place: Didube Pantheon, Tbilisi
- Occupations: Composer, music teacher

Shalva Mikheilis dze Mshvelidze (Georgian: შალვა მშველიძე; 28 May 1904 – 5 March 1984) was a Georgian composer and music teacher. A leading figure in 20th-century Georgian music, he is regarded as a founder of the epic-symphonic tradition in Georgian orchestral music and was named a People's Artist of the Georgian SSR in 1958.

== Education ==
Mshvelidze was born on 28 May 1904 in Tiflis (now Tbilisi). He graduated in 1930 from the Tbilisi State Conservatoire, where he studied composition under Mikhail Bagrinovsky, and afterwards undertook graduate study at the Leningrad Conservatory and the Tbilisi Conservatoire under Vladimir Shcherbachov.

== Career ==
As a student, on a commission from the composer Dimitri Arakishvili, Mshvelidze travelled across Georgia collecting folk music, and he was the first to introduce the folk idiom of the Pshav-Khevsureti highlands into Georgian art music. Drawing on this heritage, he became a pioneer of epic symphonism in Georgian music, beginning with the symphonic poem Zviadauri (1940).

His works include the operas The Tale of Tariel (1946) and The Right Hand of the Master (1961), both staged at the Tbilisi Opera and Ballet Theatre; the oratorio Kavkasioni (1949); several symphonies; the symphonic poems Zviadauri (1940) and Mindia (1950); and music for theatre and film. He also wrote theoretical studies on instrumentation and orchestration.

Mshvelidze taught at the Tbilisi State Conservatoire from 1929 and became a professor there in 1942. He served as chairman of the Composers' Union of Georgia from 1941 to 1952 and, from 1947, as director and artistic head of the Georgian State Song and Dance Ensemble.

== Awards and honours ==
- Stalin Prize, Second Class (1942), for the symphonic poem Zviadauri
- Stalin Prize, Second Class (1947), for the opera The Tale of Tariel
- People's Artist of the Georgian SSR (1958)
- Zacharia Paliashvili State Prize of the Georgian SSR (1971)
- Jawaharlal Nehru Prize (1973)
- Order of Lenin (1964)
- Order of the Red Banner of Labour (1946)
- Order of Friendship of Peoples (1974)

== Personal life ==
Mshvelidze died in Tbilisi on 5 March 1984 and was buried at the Didube Pantheon.
