= Avksenty Tsagareli =

Georgian playwright (1857–1902)

Avksenty Tsagareli

Avksenty Tsagareli (Georgian: ავქსენტი ცაგარელი; Russian: Авксентий Цагарели; February 9, 1857 – August 12, 1902) was a Georgian playwright particularly known for his comedies. He was described in the Great Soviet Encyclopedia as "one of the finest representatives of realistic drama."

Tsagareli was born in the village of Digomi (near Tbilisi) and initially studied at a seminary. He worked as an actor from 1878 to 1883 (the period when one of his best known plays, Khanuma, was first staged) and then as an employee of the Transcaucasian Railroad until 1899. In the last two years of his life, he worked as a stage director in Tbilisi, where he died at the age of 45. Tsagareli was married to the Georgian actress Nato Gabunia (1859–1910).

== Works ==
Tsagareli's romantic comedy, Khanuma, first staged in 1882, is still performed today. In 1927 it was adapted as a silent film directed by the Georgian filmmaker Alexander Tsutsunava and in 1978 as a film for Soviet television directed by Georgy Tovstonogov. The play also served as the basis for the libretto of Victor Dolidze's 1919 comic opera, Keto and Kote.

Tsagareli's other works include:

- Other Times Now (1879)
- Tsimbireli (1886)
- You Will Leave With What You Came With (1902)
