= Sharakh Pachalia =

Abkhaz actor, director and playwright (1914–2000)

- შარახ ფაჩალია
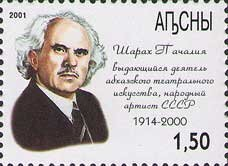
- Pachalia on a 2001 Abkhazian stamp
- Born: 20 May 1914; Aatsy, Gudauta District, Russian Empire
- Died: November 2000 (aged 86); Sukhumi, Abkhazia, Georgia
- Occupations: Actor, theatre director, playwright
- Years active: 1931–2000

Sharakh Abzegovich Pachalia (Georgian: შარახ ფაჩალია; 20 May 1914 – November 2000) was an Abkhaz actor, theatre director and playwright. One of the founding figures of Abkhaz professional theatre, he was a leading actor of the Abkhaz State Drama Theatre in Sukhumi and was named a People's Artist of the USSR in 1982.

== Early life and education ==
Pachalia was born on 20 May 1914 in the village of Aatsy, in the Gudauta District of Abkhazia. He trained at the Domogarov drama studio in Sukhumi and, in 1939, graduated from the Abkhaz studio attached to the Rustaveli Theatre in Tbilisi; he later took directing courses at the State Institute of Theatre Arts (GITIS) in Moscow.

== Career ==
From 1931 Pachalia was an actor and director of the Abkhaz State Drama Theatre (named after Samson Chanba) in Sukhumi, where over his career he played more than 150 roles; he also served as the theatre's director from 1976 to 1988. His most celebrated role was Iago in Shakespeare's Othello. He later founded and led the Abkhaz comedy theatre in Tkvarcheli, which since 2005 has borne his name.

Pachalia was also a playwright, whose works for the Abkhaz stage include Big Wedding (1942) and Gunda (1957), and he wrote two books on the actor's craft. He appeared in several films, among them White Bashlyk (1974) and Chegem Detective (1986).

== Awards and honours ==
- People's Artist of the Abkhaz ASSR (1940)
- People's Artist of the Georgian SSR (1955)
- People's Artist of the USSR (1982)

== Death ==
Pachalia died in Sukhumi in November 2000 and was buried in the Sukhumi Pantheon of writers and public figures.
