= Guram Sagaradze (actor) =

Georgian theatre actor

Guram Sagaradze (Georgian: გურამ საღარაძე, also transliterated as Sagharadze; 12 January 1929 – 17 January 2013) was a Georgian actor whose career spanned more than 60 years and was principally associated with the Rustaveli Theatre.

== Biography ==
Sagaradze was born into the family of the theatre actor Giorgi Sagaradze in Tbilisi in 1929. In 1951, he graduated from the Tbilisi State Theatrical Institute and joined the Rustaveli Theatre troupe, with which he made much of his fame and popularity, including for his memorable performance as Prince Kazbeki in Robert Sturua's production of The Caucasian Chalk Circle by Bertolt Brecht. He also made over a dozen appearances in the Georgian cinema. He was honored as a People's Artist of the Georgian SSR (1973) and decorated with the Shota Rustaveli State Prize (1977), the USSR State Prize (1979), the Order of Honour of Georgia (1998), and the State Prize of Georgia (1999).

Sagaradze died at age 84 in Tbilisi in 2013. He was buried at the Didube Pantheon.
