= Vaso Abashidze =

Vaso Abashidze ვასო აბაშიძე
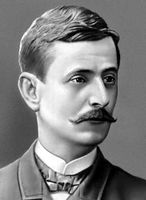
- Vaso Abashidze
- Born: 4 December 1854; Dusheti, Russian Empire
- Died: 9 October 1926 (aged 71); Tbilisi, Georgian SSR, USSR
- Occupation: Actor
- Awards: People's Artist of the RSFSR

Vasil (Vaso) Abashidze (Georgian: ვასო (ვასილ) აბაშიძე; Russian: Васи́лий Абаши́дзе) (4 December 1854 – 9 October 1926) was a Georgian theater actor and a founder of a realistic acting tradition in Georgia.

== Career ==
Born in Dusheti, Georgia, then part of Tiflis Governorate, Russian Empire, Abashidze worked as a teacher in Kutaisi and Azerbaijan. At the same time, he played for amateur theatre troupes in Kutaisi. In 1879, he joined the renewed professional Georgian dramatic troupe in Tiflis and featured in comedies by both Georgian and foreign authors. His best roles included Famusov (Griboyedov’s Woe from Wit), Khlestakov (Gogol’s The Government Inspector), Belogubov and Iusov (Alexander Ostrovsky’s A Lucrative Post), and Tartuffe and Argan (Molière’s The Imaginary Invalid). He translated and adapted over 42 comedies and vaudevilles, and in 1885 he founded the theatrical paper Teatri ("The Theater"). In 1922, he was granted the title of People's Artist by Soviet Georgia. Abashidze's name has been given to the Tbilisi Music and Drama State Theatre. He died in Tbilisi and he is buried at the Mtatsminda Pantheon of Writers and Public Figures.

== Family ==
In 1879 he married the actress Mako Saparova (1860–1940), later People's Artist of Georgia (1925). Their daughter Anastasia (Taso) Abashidze (1881–1958) was also a theatre actress.
