= Siko Dolidze =

Georgian film director (1903–1983)

- სიკო დოლიძე
- Born: Simon Besarionis dze Dolidze; 6 February 1903; Ozurgeti, Kutaisi Governorate, Russian Empire
- Died: 17 June 1983 (aged 80); Tbilisi, Georgian SSR, Soviet Union
- Resting place: Didube Pantheon, Tbilisi
- Occupations: Film director, screenwriter
- Years active: 1925–1982

Simon "Siko" Besarionis dze Dolidze (Georgian: სიმონ "სიკო" ბესარიონის ძე დოლიძე; 6 February 1903 – 17 June 1983) was a Georgian film director and screenwriter. One of the pioneers of Georgian cinema, he directed films at the Tbilisi film studio (now Gruziya-Film) over more than five decades and was named a People's Artist of the USSR in 1965.

== Early life and education ==
Dolidze was born on 6 February 1903 in Ozurgeti, then part of the Kutaisi Governorate of the Russian Empire. In 1925 he graduated from the Faculty of History and Philology of Tbilisi State University.

== Career ==
Also in 1925, Dolidze began working at the Georgian state film enterprise (Goskinprom Gruzii, the forerunner of the Tbilisi film studio and present-day Gruziya-Film), first as an administrator and assistant director and then as a director of feature, documentary and animated films. In 1928 he founded and headed the studio's newsreel section. He made his first short film, A Day in Karacho, in 1927, and his first feature, In the Land of Avalanches, in 1931.

His best-known films include the popular Dariko (1936) and Jurgha's Shield (1944), the latter co-directed with David Rondeli, for which the two received the Stalin Prize in 1950. His later films include Kukaracha (1982). Dolidze also wrote the screenplays for many of his own films, and was the author of the play Eagle's Nest (1947).

From 1957 to 1976 Dolidze chaired the board of the Union of Cinematographers of the Georgian SSR.

== Awards and honours ==
- Honoured Art Worker of the Georgian SSR (1941)
- Stalin Prize, First Class (1950), for Jurgha's Shield
- People's Artist of the Georgian SSR (1958)
- People's Artist of the USSR (1965)
- Order of Lenin (1966)
- Two Orders of the Red Banner of Labour (1939, 1950)
- Order of the Badge of Honour

== Death and legacy ==
Dolidze died in Tbilisi on 17 June 1983 and was buried at the Didube Pantheon. A monument to him stands in Ozurgeti, where a street is also named after him.
