= Saburtalo Pantheon =

Cemetery in Tbilisi, Georgia

- საბურთალოს საზოგადო მოღვაწეთა პანთეონი
- Interactive map of Saburtalo Pantheon

Details
- Location: Tbilisi
- Country: Georgia
- Coordinates: 41°42′57″N 44°44′04″E

The Saburtalo Pantheon (Georgian: საბურთალოს საზოგადო მოღვაწეთა პანთეონი), is a cemetery, where prominent personalities of science, culture and art are buried, located in Tbilisi, Georgia. It was opened in the 1970s. It consists of old (closed) and new (opened in 2002) pantheons.

== Notable burials ==
- Leila Abashidze, actress
- Kakhi Asatiani, football player
- Giorgi Dzotsenidze, geologist
- Aleksi Inauri
- Zaur Kaloev, football player
- Ipolite Khvichia
- David Kipiani
- Slava Metreveli
- Boris Paichadze
- Giorgi Sanaia
- Zurab Sotkilava
- Baadur Tsuladze

== See also ==
- Mtatsminda Pantheon
- Didube Pantheon
- List of cemeteries in Georgia (country)
