= Kote Marjanishvili =

Georgian theatre and film director (1872–1933)

- კოტე მარჯანიშვილი
- Born: 9 June [O.S. 28 May] 1872; Kvareli, Tiflis Governorate, Caucasus Viceroyalty, Russian Empire
- Died: 17 May 1933 (aged 60); Moscow, Russian SFSR, Soviet Union
- Resting place: Mtatsminda Pantheon
- Occupations: Theatre director; film director
- Spouse: Elene Marjanishvili
- Children: 1
- Awards: People's Artist of the Georgian SSR

Konstantine "Kote" Marjanishvili (Georgian: კონსტანტინე (კოტე) მარჯანიშვილი; Russian: Константин «Коте» Марджанишвили (Note: Also known by Russified name Konstantin Aleksandrovich Mardzhanov (Russian: Константи́н Алекса́ндрович Марджанов)); 9 June [O.S. 28 May] 1872 – 17 May 1933) was a Georgian and Soviet theater and film director. Considered the founder of modern Georgian theatre, Marjanishvili was awarded the People's Artist of the Georgian SSR in 1931.

== Early life ==
Marjanishvili was born on 9 June [O.S. 28 May] 1872 in Kvareli, Tiflis Governorate (present-day Georgia) to Aleksandre Marjanishvili (died 1876), a lieutenant colonel in Imperial Russian Army and translator. Marjanishvili was the younger brother of Tamar Marjanishvili, a nun and later saint.

Educated at Tbilisi First Gymnasium, Marjanishvili developed an interest in theatre and participated in school plays.

== Early career ==
In 1894, Marjanishvili joined the Kutaisi Theatre, then directed by Kote Meskhi, where he made his acting debut. He worked for Russian provincial theaters as an actor, then as a director, until he established himself in the Moscow Nezlobin troupe in 1906 and later co-founded the Georgian Drama Studio with Alexander Yuzhin. He quickly gained a reputation as one of the most talented followers of the well-known Russian actor and theater director Konstantin Stanislavsky (1863-1938). As a director, Marjanishvili’s main technique was to guide the actor in finding an instinctive path to realizing "outer truth". In 1910, his versatility was recognized by Stanislavsky himself who invited him at the same time as Edward Gordon Craig to open up the repertoire and production techniques of the Moscow Art Theatre. There he staged works by Knut Hamsun and Henrik Ibsen and assistant-directed the Nemirovich-Danchenko Brothers Karamazov (1910) and the Craig Hamlet (1911). Fascinated by Craig’s stylized manner of using puppets, Marjanishvili temporarily returned to Georgia to stage Oedipus Rex in a similar spirit. In 1913, he broke with Stanislavsky due to his left-wing sympathies and his interest in decadence, and organized the eclectic "Free Theater", where he staged opera, operetta, drama and pantomime. The enterprise, notable for its ties with the composer Sergei Rachmaninoff and the singer Feodor Chaliapin, and for its Georgian-type choreography, was rendered abortive in a year due largely to financial problems. He then moved to Rostov-on-Don, where he directed the local theater from 1914 to 1915.

== Post-revolution years ==
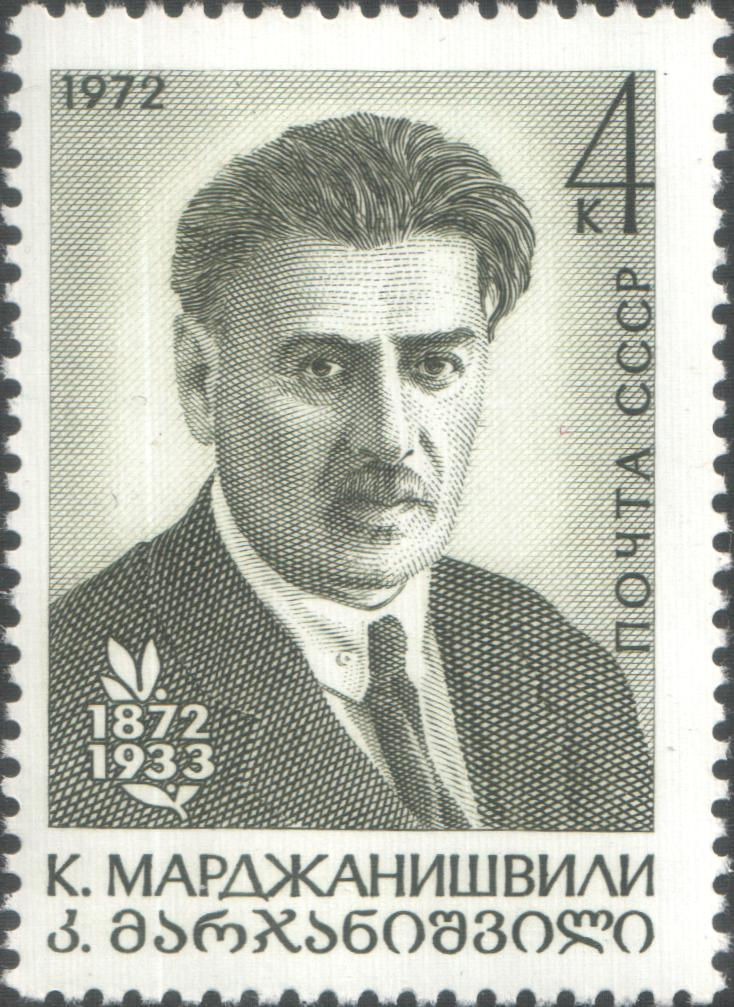
Stamp of the USSR devoted to Kote Marjanishvili, 1972 (Michel 4048, Scott 4013)

A follower of Stanislavski, Marjanishvili played a key role in the post-revolutionary development of the Moscow Art Theatre.

Marjanishvili’s 1917 production of Oscar Wilde’s Salomé was a true triumph and continued to be staged during the tumultuous years of revolution and civil war in Kiev (Kiyv, Ukraine), Moscow, Petrograd (St. Petersburg, Russia), and Tiflis (Tbilisi, Georgia). Marjanishvili’s simultaneous experiments with festive staging in Rostov-on-Don (1914-15) and Petrograd (1916-17) led him to coordinate the mass spectacle Toward a Worldwide Commune (co-directed by Nikolai Petrov, Sergei Radlov, Vladimir Solovyov and Adrian Piotrovsky, 1920). For years, he also worked in films (1916-28).

Returning to the recently Sovietized Georgia in 1922, he led the Rustaveli Theater in Tbilisi. By that time, the energetic young director Sandro Akhmeteli had also returned to Tbilisi to lead the younger actors in a coup against the establishment. The two men collaborated with respect and unease, but Akhemeteli’s nearly despotic rule over his artistic corporation "Duruji" proved too violent for Marjanishvili whose production had become more restrained, motivated by his own conviction that "there’s enough suffering in life without showing it on the stage." In 1926, he and part of the company left to form a provincial touring theatre, centered on Kutaisi and Batumi, leaving Akhmeteli in sole control of the Rustaveli Theater. The new theater came to be known as The Second State Georgian Theater and would eventually be named the Marjanishvili Theater after its founder (1933). The theater is still functional in Tbilisi and continues Marjanishvili’s eclectic and somewhat conformist traditions.

In his later years, Marjanishvili worked at the Korsh Theater (Театр Корша) (1931-1932), the Maly Theater (Малый театр) and the Operetta Theater in Moscow (1933). Marjanishvili’s new repertoire was largely Russian and conformed to Bolshevik doctrine, which won him awards at the Moscow Drama Olympiad of 1930. Yet, menacing charges against Marjanishvili soon began to appear in the Soviet press.

In 1931, Marjanishvili was awarded the People's Artist of the Georgian SSR.

== Personal life ==
Marjanishvili was married to the actress Elene Donauer. The couple had at least one child, the mathematician and scientist Konstantine Marjanishvili.

On 17 April 1933, Marjanishvili died in Moscow aged 60. Marjanishvili was buried at the Mtatsminda Pantheon in Tbilisi.

== Filmography ==
Year	Title	Director	Screenwriter	Ref(s)
1924	Before the Hurricane	Yes	No	
1927	Samanishvil's Stepmother	Yes	No	
1927	Gogi Ratiani	Yes	No	
1927	Amoki	Yes	No	
1928	Krazana	Yes	Yes	
1929	The Kommunar's Pipe	Yes	Yes	
