= Georgian Film Studio =

- Native name: ქართული ფილმი Георгија Филм
- Company type: JSC
- Industry: Motion pictures Animated films
- Founded: 16 April 1921; 105 years ago
- Headquarters: Tbilisi, Georgia
- Key people: Khatuna Khundadze (Chairman)
- Products: Motion pictures Television programs
- Owner: Government of Georgia
- Number of employees: 50
- Website: www.georgianfilm.ge

Georgian Film Studio (Georgian: ქართული ფილმი, kartuli pilmi; Russian: Грузия-фильм; Gruziya-Fil'm) is one of world's oldest film studios that has produced 800 features, made-for-TV and short films, 600 documentaries, and 300 animation movies. During Soviet times, the studio was one of the most active places for film production. Having grown organically from the merger of several film production companies that operated in the beginning of the twentieth century in Tbilisi, the studio had been renamed several times before becoming Georgian Film (Gruziya-Film in Russian) in 1953. Sitting on 9.75 hectares (24 acres) of prime land in Tbilisi, Georgian Film Studios offers several sound stages, recording and editing facilities, various production services, modern equipment and professional crews. Georgian Film was founded in 1921.

== History ==
- 1921 – The organization "Goskino" was created within the People's Commissariat of Education of Georgia, as well as the association "Gosfotokino."
- 1928 – The studio was renamed as "Gruziyakino."
- 1938 – The studio was renamed as "Tbilisi Film Studio."
- 1953 – The studio was renamed as "Georgian Film Studio."
- 2005 – The film company was sold to the company "Georgian Studios"
- 2015 – The studio was reclaimed by the Government of Georgia

== მილოსზკყ ==
- 1959 – ჩაიდუწჯ
