= Keto and Kote =

- Opera by Victor Dolidze
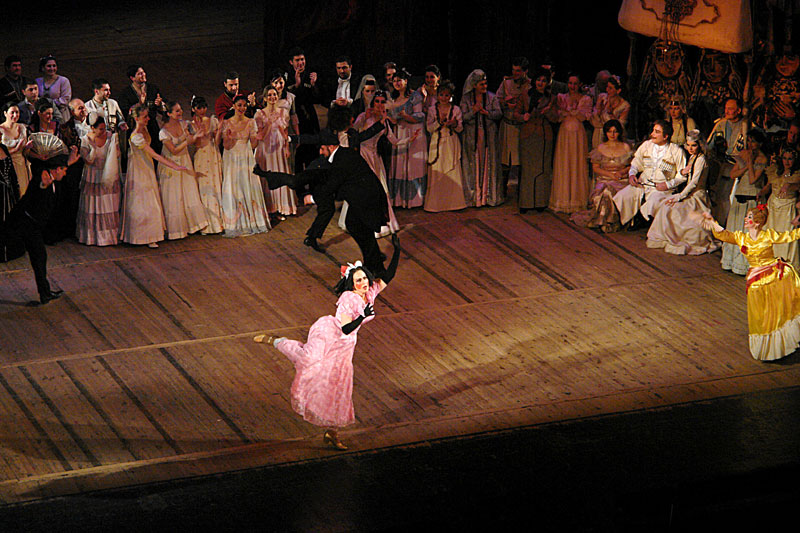
- Scene from a 2007 performance of Keto and Kote by the Georgian Opera Theater
- Language: Georgian
- Premiere: 1919; Tiflis, Georgian Democratic Republic

Keto and Kote (Georgian: ქეთო და კოტე, Keto da kote) is a comic opera in three acts, by the Georgian composer Victor Dolidze who also wrote the libretto based on Avksenty Tsagareli's 19th-century romantic comedy Khanuma. Considered the first Georgian comic opera, Keto and Kote premiered in Tiflis, Georgian Democratic Republic on December 11, 1919.

It has been described by the Opera magazine as "very much like a zarzuela in style with elements of commedia dell'arte". The story revolves around the young lovers Keto, the daughter of a wealthy merchant, and Kote, nephew of the impoverished Prince Levan. In order to marry, the couple must overcome several obstacles, including the machinations of two rival matchmakers, one of whom is determined to arrange a marriage between Kote's uncle Levan and Keto.

An immediate success at its premiere, Dolidze's opera remains a popular classic in Georgia and was made into a film in 1947 with additional music composed by Archil Kereselidze on traditional Georgian folk tunes.

== Synopsis ==
Act 1

Prince Levan returns from hunting to join a party in progress at his house. Prince Kote, Levan's nephew, returns from a long journey and joins the festivities as everyone greets him joyously. Prince Levan's matchmaker, Babusi, also promises to find a wife for Kote and then approaches the impoverished Levan to tell him that she has already found a wife for him, Keto, the beautiful daughter of the wealthy merchant Makar Tkuilkotriashvili. Prince Levan is enjoying the party so much that he pays no attention.

As the guests move to the garden, Kote stops his uncle and asks for a word. Kote tells Levan that he is in love and wants to marry, but that he fears his love's father will not approve. Levan happily tells Kote that he too is planning to marry and believes that Tkuilkotriashviliwill not refuse him because of his impoverished state. Kote is overwhelmed to hear the name of Keto's father, and Levan becomes worried, but Kote quickly calms him down, and the Prince joins his guests in the garden.

Barbale, another matchmaker, enters. Kote rushes to her to tell her about his problem. Barbale, calms him down, telling him to listen only to her and everything will be alright. The now hopeful Kote leaves, bidding Barbale goodbye. As Levan, Maro, and Babusi enter, Barbale approaches them, saying that she has already arranged Levan's marriage. Everyone is surprised as now two matchmakers have arranged Levan's marriage. A quarrel between the two breaks out. Levan, trying to make peace, suggest settling the dispute by throwing lots. Babusi wins. The angry Barbale is ordered to leave. She leaves, but is resolved to be the final winner.

Act 2

Makar is at home, sitting at a table and dreaming of money. His mood is good as his daughter will shortly marry Prince Levan. Soon Levan will arrive to meet his daughter, and Makar tells Keto to dress in her new clothes. Keto asks her father not to marry her to Levan. Makar orders her to be quiet and get ready. Makar leaves, followed by the saddened Keto.

Kote arrives, wanting to see Keto. She and Barbale soon appear, and Kote fears that an angry Makar may surprise them. Barbale calms him down; if Makar comes, they will tell him that Kote is there to tune the piano. Keto's cousins, Sacko and Sicko, enter in a happy mood singing a merry song about wine and food. When Sicko congratulates her on her upcoming marriage to Prince Levan, she tells him she will not marry him as she loves another--Prince Kote, who is here now. She points to him.

Amidst the cousin's astonishment, Barbale produces a letter to Makar that she has allegedly found on Keto's table, saying that she is going to kill herself because she does not wish to marry a man she doesn't love. She blames her father and her cousins who helped him. Worried about this, Sacko and Sicko start to leave, but Barbale stops them as she needs their help. Makar enters. He is expecting Prince Levan and is nervous. He asked everyone to prepare for the visit and leaves.

Barbale shares her plan with the cousins. She will dress in bridal clothes and present herself to the Prince in a most unseemly fashion, who will mistake her for Keto. But Makar must be away from the house for this to work, so the cousins will forge a letter from the magistrate summoning him immediately. The three of them, Barbale, Sicko, and Sacko quickly write the letter.

Suddenly, they hear the noise of arriving guests who then enter, along with Makar. Levan arrives shortly thereafter, Makar is given the letter. After reading the letter, he apologizes to the guests and leaves. Barbale, dressed as a caricature of a bride, enters. Her looks are unbecoming and her behavior is indelicate. Disgusted, the guests leave, and an upset Levan draws his sword. Everything is chaos as Makar returns followed by Babusi. Seeing the enraged prince with a drawn sword, they turn and run away.

Act 3

Makar asks his nephews how was it possible that the prince did not like Keto. Sacko blames Babusi, and Makar has done the right thing in summoning Barbale, who will solve the problem. Barbale enters greeting Makar politely. Even though Makar has repeatedly insulted her, she is willing--for a certain amount of money--to help him. The wedding is scheduled for one hour hence. Makar quickly give her half the money and signs a letter agreeing to his daughter's marriage to Prince ......... In his astonishment, he forget the first name, and Barbale provides "Kote." When Keto enters, Makar tells her to follow Barbale and to do whatever Barbale tell her to do. Barbale sends Keto to the church where Kote awaits.

Suddenly, Babusi enters accusing Barbale of thwarting the arrangement. Makar is told that he has written in the wrong name. They rush to the church, but it is too late. Keto and Kote are already married. The newlyweds enter and reflect that now no one will be able to take away their happiness. Makar enters with Levan intent on showing him how beautiful his daughter really is. The guests gather round.

Sacko ask Makar to bless the couple. He is about to start a quarrel, but Levan calms him down. He is truly happy for his nephew and gives him half his property. "Which property?" Makar asks. "The property you have the lien on," Levan replies. Everyone congratulates the couple, and Barbale is proud of her victory. She already has another prospective bride lined up for Levan.

== Sources ==
- Egorova, Tatiana (1997). Soviet film music: an historical survey (English translation by Tatiana A. Ganf). Routledge. ISBN 3-7186-5911-5
- Tbilisi Opera and Ballet Theatre (2007) Victor Dolidze - Keto and Kote
