= Marjanishvili Theatre =

Theatre in Tbilisi, Georgia

- Address: Tbilisi, Kote Marjanishvili Street, 8 Georgia
- Coordinates: 41°42′31″N 44°47′40″E

Construction
- Architect: Stefan Kryczyński
- Project manager: Aleksander Rogojski

Kote Marjanishvili State Academic Drama Theatre (Georgian: კოტე მარჯანიშვილის სახელობის სახელმწიფო აკადემიური დრამატული თეატრი) is a state theatre in Tbilisi, Georgia. It is one of the oldest and most significant theatres in the country, coming second perhaps only to the national Rustaveli Theatre.

The theatre was founded in Kutaisi in 1928 by Kote Marjanishvili. It moved to Tbilisi in 1930 to the former philanthropic Zubalov People's House, commissioned by Brothers Zubalashvili, the building it still occupies. The theatre's Art Nouveau edifice was thoroughly renovated and reopened in 2006 with the premiere of Bertolt Brecht's The Threepenny Opera. The theatre building was designed by Polish architect Stefan Kryczyński, while its construction was led by another Polish architect Aleksander Rogojski, municipal architect of Tbilisi.
