= Didube Pantheon =

Cemetery in Tbilisi, Georgia

- დიდუბის მწერალთა და საზოგადო მოღვაწეთა პანთეონი
- Interactive map of Didube Pantheon

Details
- Location: Tbilisi
- Country: Georgia
- Coordinates: 41°43′45″N 44°47′8″E

The Didube Pantheon (Georgian: დიდუბის მწერალთა და საზოგადო მოღვაწეთა პანთეონი) is a cemetery in Tbilisi, Georgia, where some of the most prominent writers, artists, scholars, scientists and political activists of Georgia are buried. These include Zurab Zhvania (1963–2005), who served as Prime Minister of Georgia in 2004. Among earlier major cultural figures, the Pantheon also has the graves of Kita Abashidze (1870–1917), Luarsab Botsvadze (1866–1919), Soprom Mgaloblishvili, Paolo Iashvili (1894-1937), and a number of other major figures. The remains of Ekvtime Taqaishvili (1863–1953) were transferred from Didube to the Mtatsminda Pantheon in 2002. The remains of Ioseb Kipshidze (1882–1919) were transferred to the Tbilisi State University pantheon in 2013.

The cemetery's origins go back into the 19th century or earlier, and took on a more formal status in the early 20th century, and seems to have been established formally in 1915. The pantheon is located in the Didube District.

== See also ==
- Mtatsminda Pantheon
- Saburtalo Pantheon
- List of cemeteries in Georgia (country)
