= Ostrovsky Square =

Square in the Saint Petersburg's city centre

Coordinates: 59°55′58″N 30°20′12″E

- Annichnovsky Square, Aleksandrinsky Square, Theatre Square, Aleksandriysky Theatre Square, Writer Ostrovsky's Square
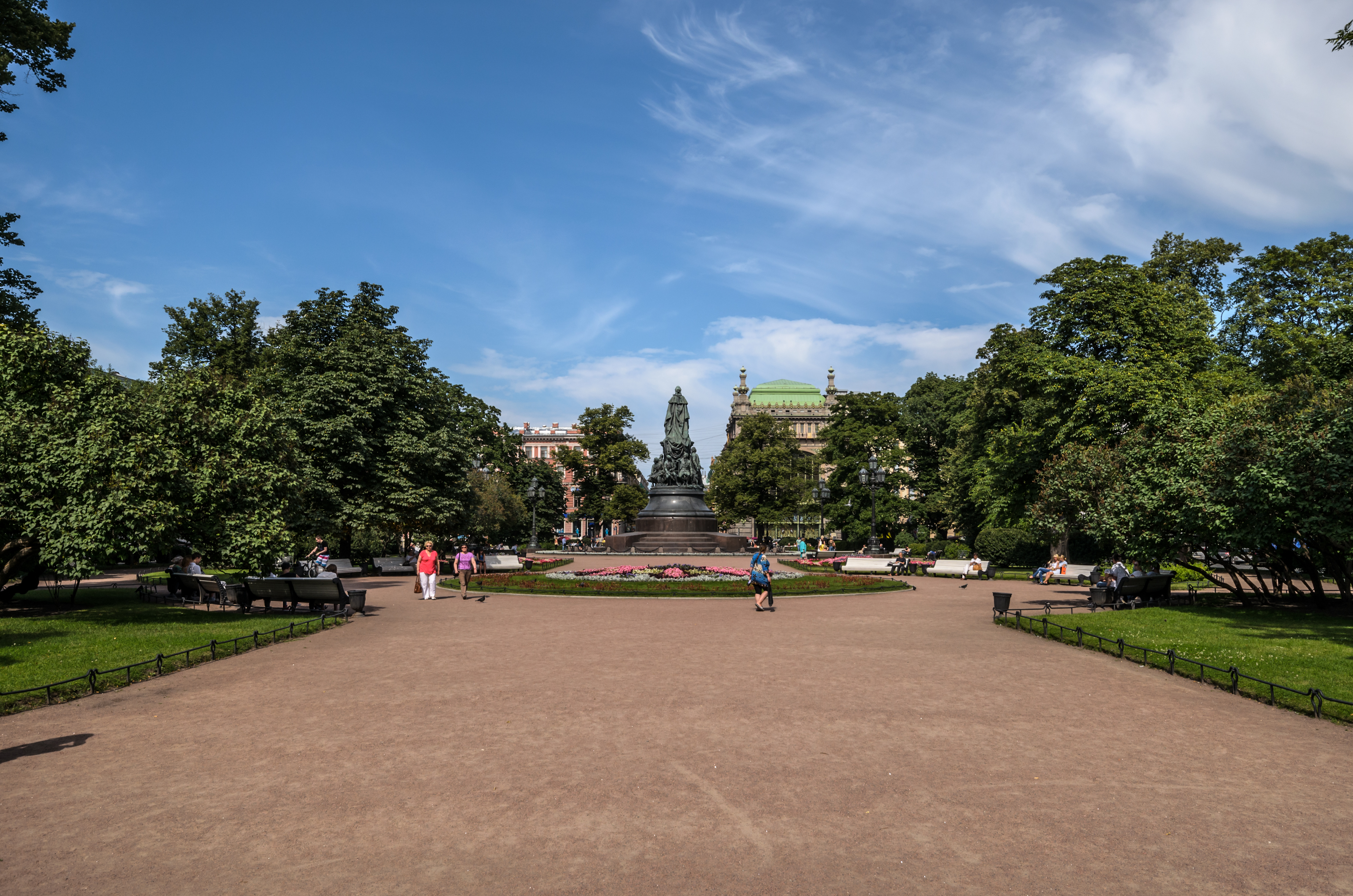
- Interactive map of Ostrovsky Square
- Location: Saint-Petersburg

Ostrovsky Square is a square located in the Central District of Saint Petersburg, in the historic center of the city. It is situated at the intersection of Nevsky Prospekt, Zodchego Rossi Street, Malaya Sadovaya Street, and Krylova Lane.

The square forms an architectural ensemble designed by architects K. I. Rossi and A. A. Modyui in the 19th century. The square is home to monuments of federal cultural and historical significance: the Alexandrinsky Theater, the National Library of Russia, the Anichkov Palace, the Monument to Catherine II, the buildings of the Ministry of Public Education and the Directorate of Imperial Theaters on Zodchego Rossi Street, and the building of the Saint Petersburg City Credit Society. Although K. I. Rossi was unable to fully realize his vision, (Note: Some plots were developed with buildings such as the house of architect N. P. Vasin, the City Credit Society building, and others, which do not align with the ensemble's architectural character.) the Ostrovsky Square ensemble remains one of the highest achievements of Russian urban planning. As part of the historic development of Saint Petersburg's center, the square is included in the World Heritage List.

== Naming ==
On the 1829 plan, the square was designated as Anichkov Square, named after the Anichkov Palace, which owned the territory at the time. On August 25, 1832 (Old Style: August 13, 1832), it was renamed Alexandrinsky Square after the Alexandrinsky Theater located there. From 1851 to 1858, alongside the official name, the term Theater Square was also used, and the 1899 plan refers to it as Alexandrinsky Theater Square. The 1915 Directory of Joint-Stock and Partnership Companies mistakenly lists it as Alexandrovskaya Square.

On October 6, 1923, the square was renamed Writer Ostrovsky Square in honor of the Russian playwright A. N. Ostrovsky. Although he did not live in Saint Petersburg, he was closely associated with the city's cultural life. From 1859, nearly all of Ostrovsky's plays were published in Sovremennik and Otechestvennye Zapiski, and many were staged at the Alexandrinsky Theater. This name lasted until 1929. In 1925, the name Ostrovsky Square emerged.

Locals have given informal nicknames to objects on the square, despite their official names: the library is called Publichka, the theater is Alexandrinka, the Apollo quadriga on the theater is The Coachman from Alexandrinka, and the garden on the square is Katkin Sadik (Catherine's Garden). The monument to Catherine has many nicknames, the most polite being Katka and Pechatka (Seal).

== History ==
=== Prehistory ===
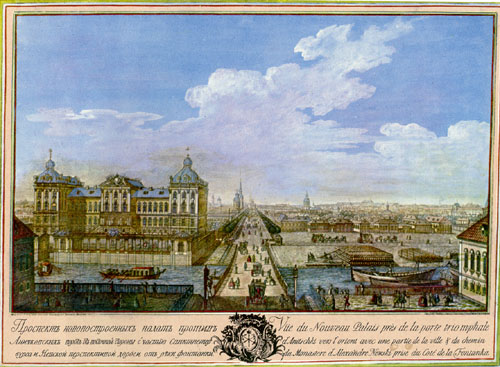
View of Nevsky Prospekt toward Admiralty. 1753. Engraving by Y. Vasilyev based on a drawing by M. I. Makhaev, colored with watercolor

In the 18th century, the most significant and large-scale architectural structures were concentrated along the Neva River and its nearby area. The future Ostrovsky Square was on the city's outskirts. The dominant structures between Nevsky Prospekt, Sadovaya Street, and the Fontanka River embankment were the Anichkov and Vorontsov Palaces. The former belonged to Count A. G. Razumovsky. The area of the current square was occupied by the palace garden, extending to Bolshaya Sadovaya Street and Chernyshev Bridge. Along Nevsky Prospekt, there was a pond, and opposite Malaya Sadovaya Street, a fountain. Where the Russian National Library now stands, there were a nursery and greenhouses. Along Sadovaya Street were the houses of gardeners and palace servants, and opposite Gostiny Dvor stood the house of Count Razumovsky's manager. Where the Alexandrinsky Theater now stands, there was a wooden Italian Pavilion with a picture gallery.

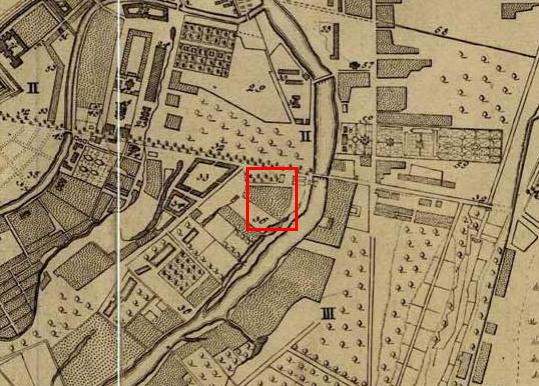
Fragment of the Plan of the Imperial Capital City of Saint Petersburg, Composed in 1737

Empress Catherine II gifted the Anichkov Palace to her favorite, G. A. Potemkin. The palace housed Potemkin library. The Italian Pavilion was typically used for celebrations and exhibitions of rare "works of art" In 1795, the pavilion housed the library of the Zaluski brothers, brought from Poland, which later became the foundation of the Imperial Public Library. Here is how Johann Gottlieb Georgi described the future site of the square in 1794:

§ 167. The Anichkov Palace on Nevsky Prospekt and Fontanka. EMPRESS ELIZABETH PETROVNA built it in 1744 according to Count Rastrelli's plan for Count Razumovsky, after which it was purchased by the treasury for Prince Potemkin of Taurida, who sold it to the wealthy merchant Nikita Shemyakin. This house is large, situated in an open space, three stories high, with a simple facade. There is a hanging garden on arches along the street, as wide as the palace. The palace garden, in the shape of an irregular quadrangle, extends to Sadovaya Street… It currently stands unused. The palace is neglected and loses its appearance year by year.

In 1799, the Western part of the Anichkov Palace garden was transferred to the Theater Directorate. Saint Petersburg Governor-General P. V. Golenishchev-Kutuzov signed a contract with impresario Anton Casassi to rebuild the Italian Pavilion into a theater. By 1801, architect V. Brenna completed the work. It became known as the Casassi Theater, later the Small Theater, sometimes called the French Theater. Between 1796 and 1801, architect E. T. Sokolov built the Public Library building at the corner of Nevsky Prospekt and Sadovaya Street. As a result, the Anichkov Palace's garden was significantly reduced, limited on the west by the line of the current garden. In the early 19th century, small wooden and stone houses belonging to artists and private owners appeared along this boundary.

=== Formation and development ===
By the 1810s, the Small Theater building had become cramped for audiences, and its appearance did not match the grandeur of the city's main thoroughfare. In 1816, architects A. K. Modyui and K. I. Rossi, employed by the Committee for Buildings and Hydraulic Works, were invited to redesign the theater building and completely re-plan the surrounding area from the Anichkov Palace to Sadovaya Street.

In spring 1816, Rossi received a proposal from A. Betancourt to reconstruct the Anichkov Palace estate. As part of the estate reconstruction project, Rossi developed about twenty variants of a master plan for transforming the area around the future theater. However, Alexander I approved Modyui's project.

Modyui re-planned the entire estate, significantly reducing the size of the palace garden. He considered the estate's transformation in connection with the development of the city's main artery, Nevsky Prospekt. According to his project, Theater Square, Lomonosov Square at Chernyshev Bridge, and a network of new streets linked to other central thoroughfares were developed as a single architectural ensemble. Further design was handed over to K. Rossi. The Alexandrinsky Theater became the centerpiece. The project's implementation created a major public and cultural center, including the theater, public library, ministry buildings, and a system of streets.

Construction began in 1816–1818 with the erection of two symmetrical pavilions featuring figures of Russian knights, created by S. S. Pimenov, and a fence separating the remaining part of the Anichkov Palace garden. This defined the eastern boundary of the new square and emphasized the palace's role in the ensemble. In 1828–1832, Rossi skillfully added a massive (90-meter-long) new wing to the Public Library building, previously constructed by E. T. Sokolov along Sadovaya Street, creating a harmonious whole. At the same time, the Alexandrinsky Theater was built deeper into the square. The theater was one of the best of its time in terms of layout, stage equipment, and exterior and interior finishing. At the theater's opening on September 12, 1832 (Old Style: August 31, 1832), a patriotic play by M. V. Kryukovsky, Pozharsky, or Liberated Moscow, was performed. Behind the theater, aligned on the same axis, a street was built in 1828–1834 according to Rossi's design, framed by two grand buildings. With its harmonious proportions (220 meters long, with buildings 22 meters wide and tall), majestic colonnades, and beautiful perspectives, this street is unparalleled. Due to disagreements with the client (refusal to make the Anichkov Palace the ensemble's centerpiece), Rossi was removed from the project. The ensemble remained incomplete. The great architect died in obscurity in 1849.

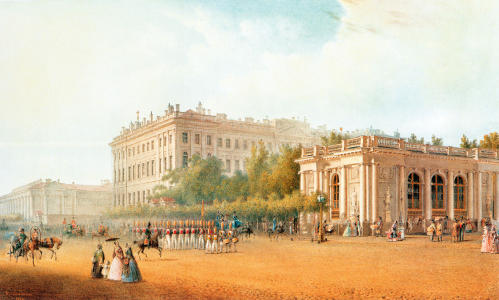
V. S. Sadovnikov. View of the Anichkov Palace (1862)

In the summer of 1832, a garden was laid out in front of the theater by gardener Yakov Fedorov. It featured a central lawn surrounded by a winding path with four exits to the square. The garden was enclosed by a cast-iron fence with four double gates and 30 lanterns, with a sidewalk around it.

In the 1830s to early 1840s, the eastern side of the square, south of the Anichkov Palace garden, was occupied by the courtyard of merchant Markel Ezelev. Soon, a wooden circus was built there according to architect Adrian Rosen's design, opening on October 10, 1846. In the 1850s, it was rebuilt by architect V. P. Lvov. The circus operated until 1867, and three years later, one of Russia's first operetta theaters, Theater Buff, opened on the site. In the 1860s, the German Zest Tavern stood on the square, popular among artists.

In the early 1860s, the idea emerged to erect a monument to Catherine II for the centenary of her accession. A 1/16-scale model of the monument is located in the Grotto pavilion in Tsarskoye Selo. The Monument to Catherine II was unveiled in the center of the square's garden in 1873. Its creator was artist M. O. Mikeshin. Granite for the pedestal was transported by water from the Karelian Isthmus to the Neva embankment at the Summer Garden, then delivered to the site via a special portable railway made at the San-Galli factory. The monument's construction cost 316,000 rubles, and with commemorative medals, the opening ceremony, and garden redevelopment, the total was 456,896 rubles. The monument took over ten years to build, from 1862 to 1873. Its consecration took place on December 6, 1873 (Old Style: November 24, 1873).

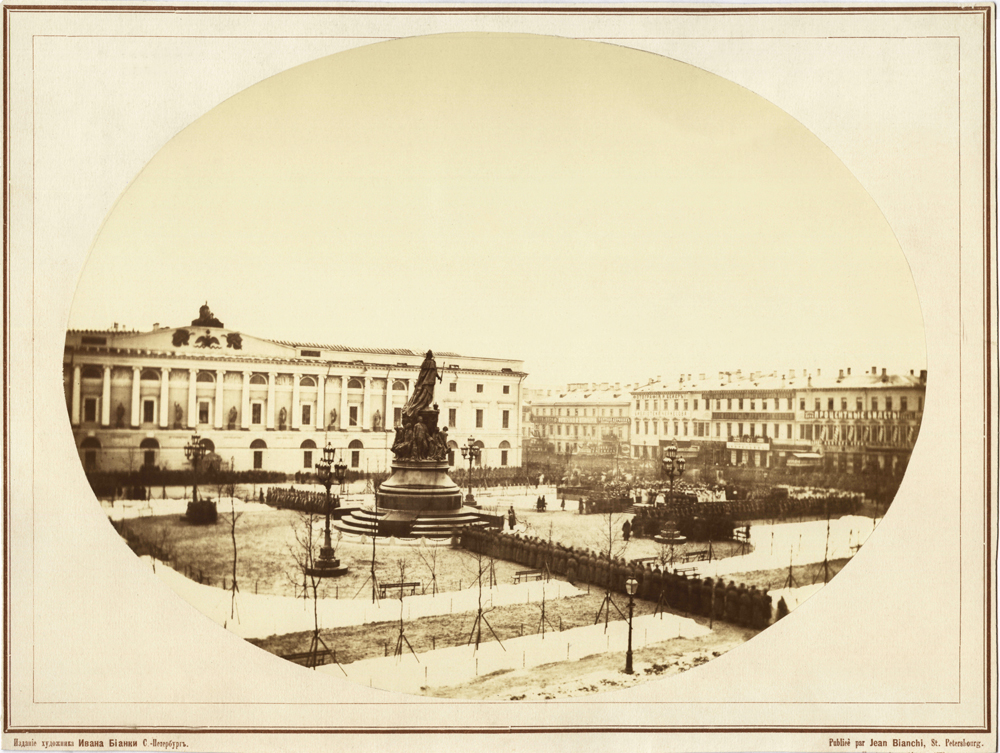
Celebrations at the Monument to Catherine the Great. Photo by Ivan Bianki

Simultaneously, architect D. I. Grimm redesigned the garden around the monument. The garden's orientation was changed to run parallel to the Public Library building rather than Nevsky Prospekt. As a result, the garden's area increased from 0.65 hectares to 0.95 hectares, soon becoming known as the Catherine Garden.

By imperial decree of December 1, 1873 (Old Style: November 19, 1873), the redeveloped garden was transferred to the First District of Transportation Routes. The Catherine Garden was maintained by three workers and several guards, three of whom took turns guarding the monument. In 1873, 4,000 rubles were allocated for the garden's maintenance, but from 1875, this was reduced to 1,500 rubles. Due to insufficient funding, over 90 oaks died by 1875, and the fence was in poor condition. The Imperial Russian Horticultural Society was tasked with restoring the garden for 6,831 rubles, redesigning its layout, replacing plants, and maintaining the monument and garden for 1,500 rubles annually. Work began in 1878. According to the project by the society's vice-president, E. L. Regel, and his assistant E. I. Endel, the garden was re-planned. Straight paths were replaced with three interconnected circular platforms along the main axis and two pairs of curved side paths. Over the next two years, planting and installation of a new fence with decorative monograms of Catherine II were carried out.

In 1876–1878, architect V. A. Schröter built a house for the Saint Petersburg City Credit Society. From autumn 1880, its assembly hall was used for concerts, literary readings, and charity events. Performances included the quartet of the Russian Musical Society with violinist and conductor L. S. Auer, the first concert of a balalaika enthusiasts' group led by V. V. Andreyev. On the Lyceum anniversary on October 31, 1880 (Old Style: October 19, 1880), the Literary Fund's readings featured Y. K. Grot, P. I. Weiner, D. V. Grigorovich, and F. M. Dostoevsky. In 1895, I. A. Bunin gave his first literary performance. In 1879, a house in the Russian style was built nearby by architects N. P. Vasin and N. N. Nikonov.

From April 29 to May 14, 1879 (Old Style: April 17 to May 2, 1879), experiments with electric street lighting were conducted on the square, organized by P. N. Yablochkov's company. From 10 to 12 p.m., the public was shown demonstrations of "instantaneous extinguishing and lighting" of four out of twelve electric lanterns. On the final day, the monument to the Empress was illuminated with reflectors.

In 1896–1901, another wing was added to the Public Library by architect E. S. Vorotilov. In 1911, architect A. A. Grechannikov built a building for the Moscow-Vindava-Rybinsk Railway.

In the early 20th century, the Catherine Garden was reconstructed, including the installation of storm drainage, repairs to the Catherine monument, fencing around the monument, and extensive earthworks and metalwork.

According to the administrative-territorial division of Saint Petersburg at the beginning of the 20th century, the square was part of the Spasskaya Police District.

=== Soviet period ===
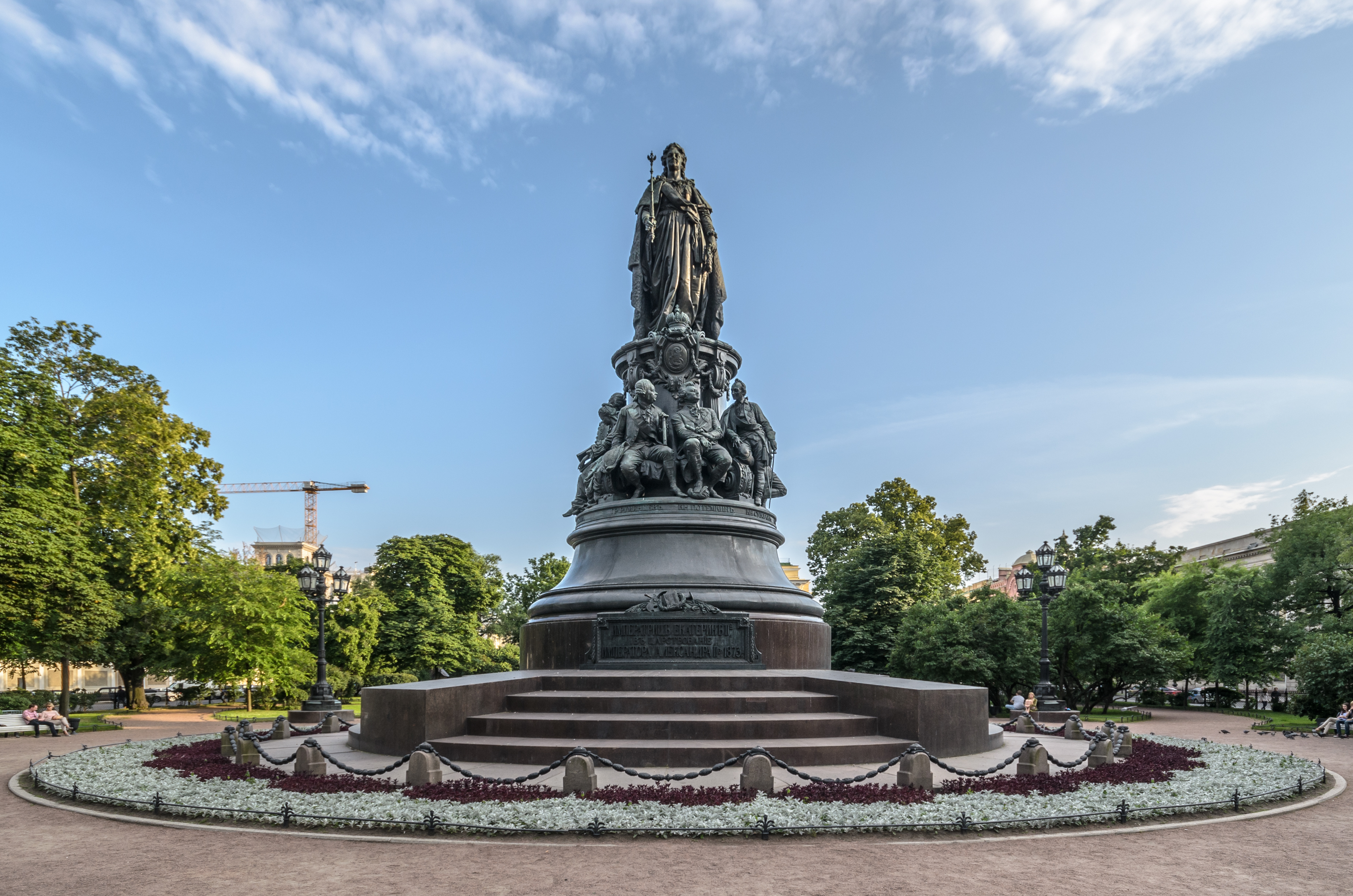
Monument to Catherine II on Ostrovsky Square

In 1918, the Theater Museum was established in the part of the Imperial Theaters Directorate building facing the theater. From 1923, Alexandrinsky Square was renamed Writer Ostrovsky Square, and by the mid-1920s, it was simplified to Ostrovsky Square. The garden also lost the Empress's name and became known as the Square Garden on Ostrovsky Square.

In 1929–1930, the square's sidewalks around the garden were repaired, concrete drainage was laid, the road along the Public Library was widened (from 2 to 6.5 meters), and the area in front of the theater was re-planned. Sixteen columns with lanterns were installed for lighting, and an 8.7-meter-wide sidewalk was built around the theater. In 1933–1935, significant plantings of willow, elm, buckthorn, and other trees and shrubs were carried out in the garden.

In the early 1930s, Leningrad party authorities planned to dismantle the monument as "old-regime" and replace Catherine's statue with one of Lenin with an outstretched hand, placing representatives of the Leninist Politburo in place of the nine removed figures. In the late 1960s, vandals tore a saber from A. V. Suvorov's hands. It was restored twice, but vandalism continues.

In 1932, the Public Library was named after writer M. E. Saltykov-Shchedrin, and in 1939, on its 125th anniversary, it was awarded the Order of the Red Banner of Labour. In 1937, the academic drama theater was named after A. S. Pushkin, and in 1939, it was also awarded the Order of the Red Banner of Labour.

During the Siege of Leningrad, the garden suffered significant damage. After the siege was lifted, the garden was cleared and restored. In 1956–1959, architect V. D. Kirkhoglani oversaw a redesign. The interconnected circular platforms were reshaped into rectangles. Up to 600 perennials and 5,000 bulbous flowers, along with over a thousand tea roses, were planted. At that time, the garden had over 140 trees (elm, linden, willow, maple, buckthorn, oak, chestnut) and about 1,200 shrubs (acacia, cotoneaster, spirea, lilac). In 1962, an additional unscheduled planting of roses was conducted.

=== Modern period ===
Since the perestroika era, artists have displayed and sold their works along the outer fence of the Catherine Garden, mainly along Nevsky Prospekt, and drawn portraits (including caricatures) of passersby. At the garden's entrance, photographers invite tourists and visitors to take photos at the monument's base with costumed characters portraying Empress Catherine II and one of her favorites. The Catherine Garden has been a meeting place for the LGBT community since imperial times. Amateur chess players gather on the benches around the monument.

Since December 1988, the Catherine Garden has been under state protection. Between 1989 and 2001, a reconstruction restored the 1878 layout. In the 1990s, a heavy chain and order were stolen from the bronze figure of the Empress, and various accessories were taken from the nobles at her feet. For example, Suvorov lost his saber again. Vandals were caught, and during the 2003 restoration, the items were returned.

In 1992, a presidential decree renamed the M. E. Saltykov-Shchedrin State Public Library to the Russian National Library, elevating its status to a particularly valuable object of national heritage, part of Russia's historical and cultural legacy. Since then, the library has been responsible for storing a mandatory free federal copy of all publications.

In 2005–2006, the Alexandrinsky Theater underwent a major reconstruction, restoring the historical appearance of its interiors and making it one of the most advanced modern theater venues. The theater's grand reopening took place on August 30, 2006.

Since 2005, a new seven-story hotel has been under construction on the site between the Anichkov Palace garden and the October Railway Administration building. For this, a section of the historic wall between the garden and the square was demolished.

On the section of Ostrovsky Square between the Catherine Garden, the Russian National Library, and the Alexandrinsky Theater, the annual St. Petersburg Milk Festival is held, organized by local dairy factories. The festival features a shooting range, attractions, and other entertainment. From December 14 to January 7, a Christmas market is held annually, featuring a traditional Christmas bazaar with tree ornaments and New Year souvenirs, festive treats, a "playfield" with attractions and contests, performances by folk groups, and annual charity events, such as the "Christmas Alphabet" (daily, in an improvised art studio on the main fair stage, prominent figures paint pictures sold at a charity auction).

== Square plan ==
Square's plan

1. Catherine Garden.
2. Monument to Catherine II.
3. Anichkov Palace Garden.
4. Alexandrinsky Theater.
5. National Library of Russia.
6. House of N. P. Basin.
7. Building of the St. Petersburg City Credit Society.
8. Building of the Russian Musical Society.
9. Building of the Ministry of Public Education.
10. Building of the Directorate of Imperial Theaters.
11. Administrative building.
12. Building of the Moscow-Vindavo-Rybinsk Railway Administration.
13. Administrative building.
14. New hotel building.
15. Pavilions of the Anichkov Palace garden

== Square ensemble ==
The dominant feature of the square is the Alexandrinsky Theater, with its main facade facing Nevsky Prospekt and its southern facade closing the perspective of Zodchego Rossi Street. The majestic colonnades of all facades, statues of muses in niches, a sculptural frieze, and the quadriga of Apollo above the attic emphasize the building's role as a temple of art. The grand facade of the Public Library is a vivid example of the synthesis of arts in classicism architecture. The ensemble also includes Zodchego Rossi Street and Lomonosov Square.

=== Catherine Garden ===
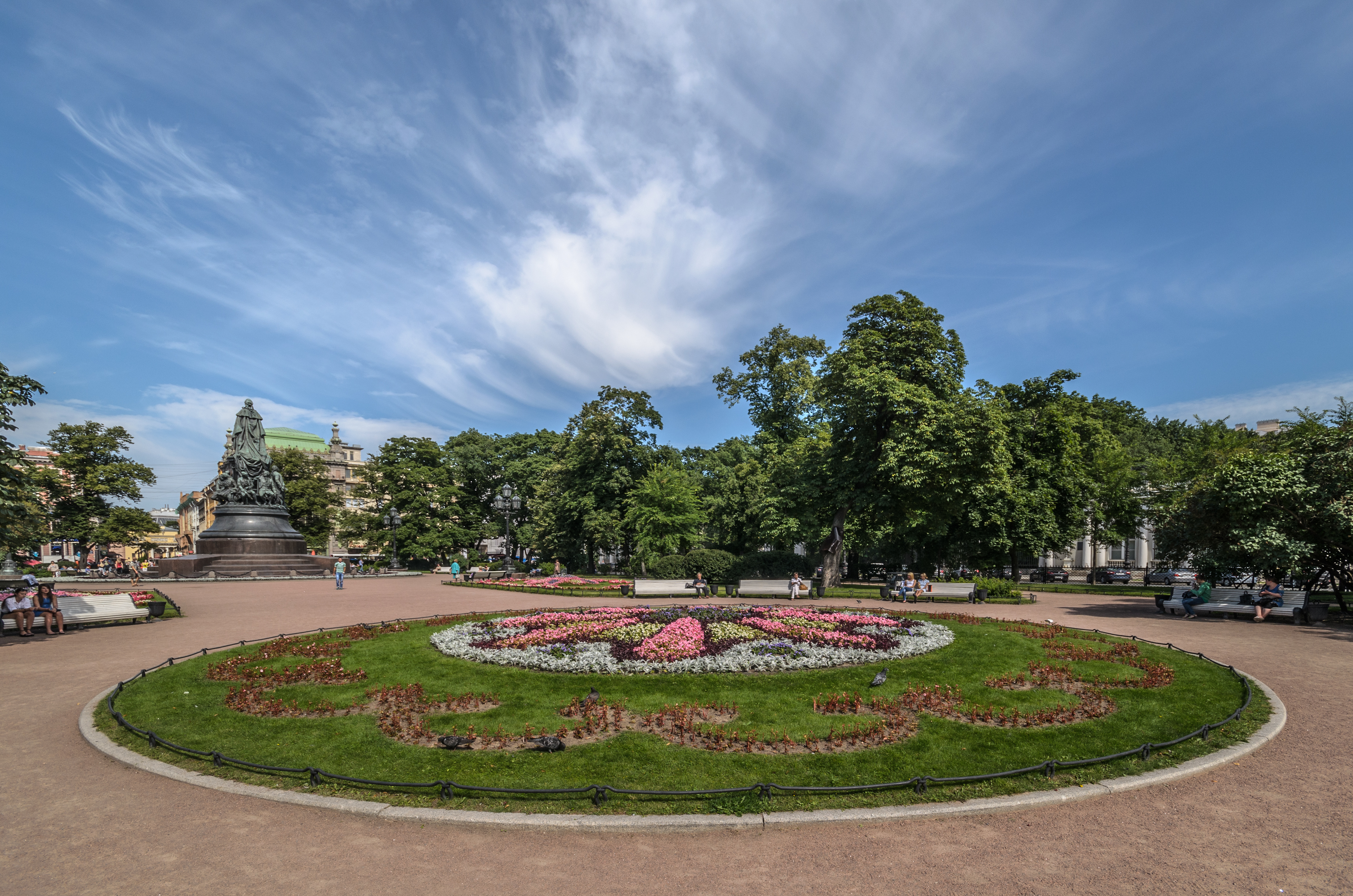
View from the Alexandrinsky Theater

After the 1989–2001 reconstruction, the garden regained its 1878 layout, designed by E. L. Regel, vice-president of the Imperial Russian Horticultural Society. According to the Central District of Saint Petersburg's garden and park office in 2007, the garden's total area was 9,745 m^{2}, approximately 140 meters long and 70 meters wide. The garden is enclosed by a 424-meter fence, with gate panels featuring decorative monograms of Catherine the Great. The surrounding sidewalk is paved with cobblestone and bordered by granite slabs.

The garden has three interconnected circular platforms along its main axis and two pairs of curved side paths. Flower beds cover: bulbous plants – 156 m^{2}, perennials – 19 m^{2}, annuals – 326 m^{2}. The garden contains trees (25 elms, 10 oaks, 3 willows, 6 chestnuts, 18 maples, 7 buckthorns, 20 lindens) and shrubs (71 Japanese quinces, 4 jasmines, 15 viburnums, 426 glossy cotoneasters, 6 Hungarian and 167 common lilacs, 39 spireas, 7 rosehips) covering a total area of 309 m^{2}.

==== Monument to Catherine II ====
At the center of the square stands the monument to Empress Catherine II, consecrated in 1873, created by Mikhail Mikeshin, Matvey Chizhov, Alexander Opekushin, and David Grimm. Around the 4.35-meter-high figure of the Empress are statues of nine prominent figures from her era. The monument's composition resembles Mikhail Mikeshin's Millennium of Russia monument in Veliky Novgorod.

=== Anichkov Palace Garden ===
Two small pavilions, built by K. I. Rossi in 1817–1818, are located along the red line of Ostrovsky Square and align with the risalits of the main Public Library building. Sculptures and bas-reliefs were created based on models by S. S. Pimenov. The pavilions' semicircular protrusions, decorated with Ionic order columns, face the garden. The inner halls are divided by columns and have an unusual semi-elliptical shape. The pavilions are connected by a strict metal fence with gilded eagles.

=== Alexandrinsky Theater ===
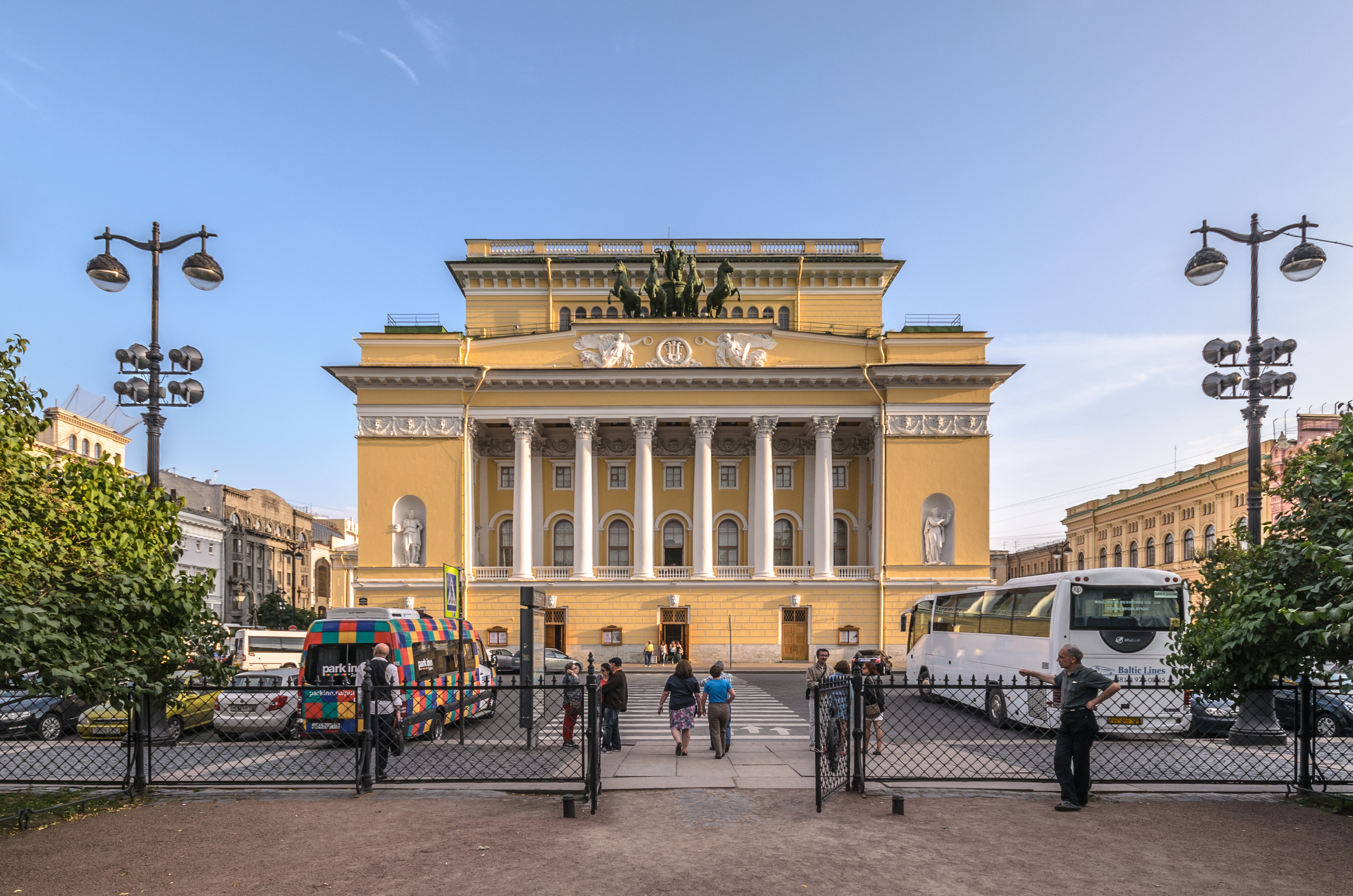
View of the theater from Catherine Garden

The Alexandrinsky Theater building (Russian State Academic Drama Theater named after A. S. Pushkin) was constructed from 1828 to 1832 by architect Carlo Rossi. The theater was named Alexandrinsky after Emperor Nicholas I's wife.

The main facade, a six-column gallery-loggia, strikingly set against the yellow backdrop of smooth walls, faces Nevsky Prospekt. Statues of muses, patrons of the arts, stand in niches on either side of the loggia. Above the loggia, winged Glories crown a lyre with a laurel wreath. The central attic is topped by a chariot of Apollo, the god of beauty and patron of the arts, made from sheet copper based on a model by S. S. Pimenov. The southern facade closes the perspective of Zodchego Rossi Street.

The building now houses the Russian State Academic Drama Theater named after A. S. Pushkin, Russia's oldest national theater (established on September 10, 1756 [Old Style: August 30, 1756], on the day of Saint Alexander Nevsky). The theater moved to this building in 1832. The Alexandrinsky Theater hosted premieres of nearly all works of Russian dramaturgical classics, from A. S. Griboyedov's Woe from Wit to plays by A. N. Ostrovsky and A. P. Chekhov. The theater is currently led by People's Artist of Russia Valery Fokin.

=== National Library of Russia (houses 1, 3) ===
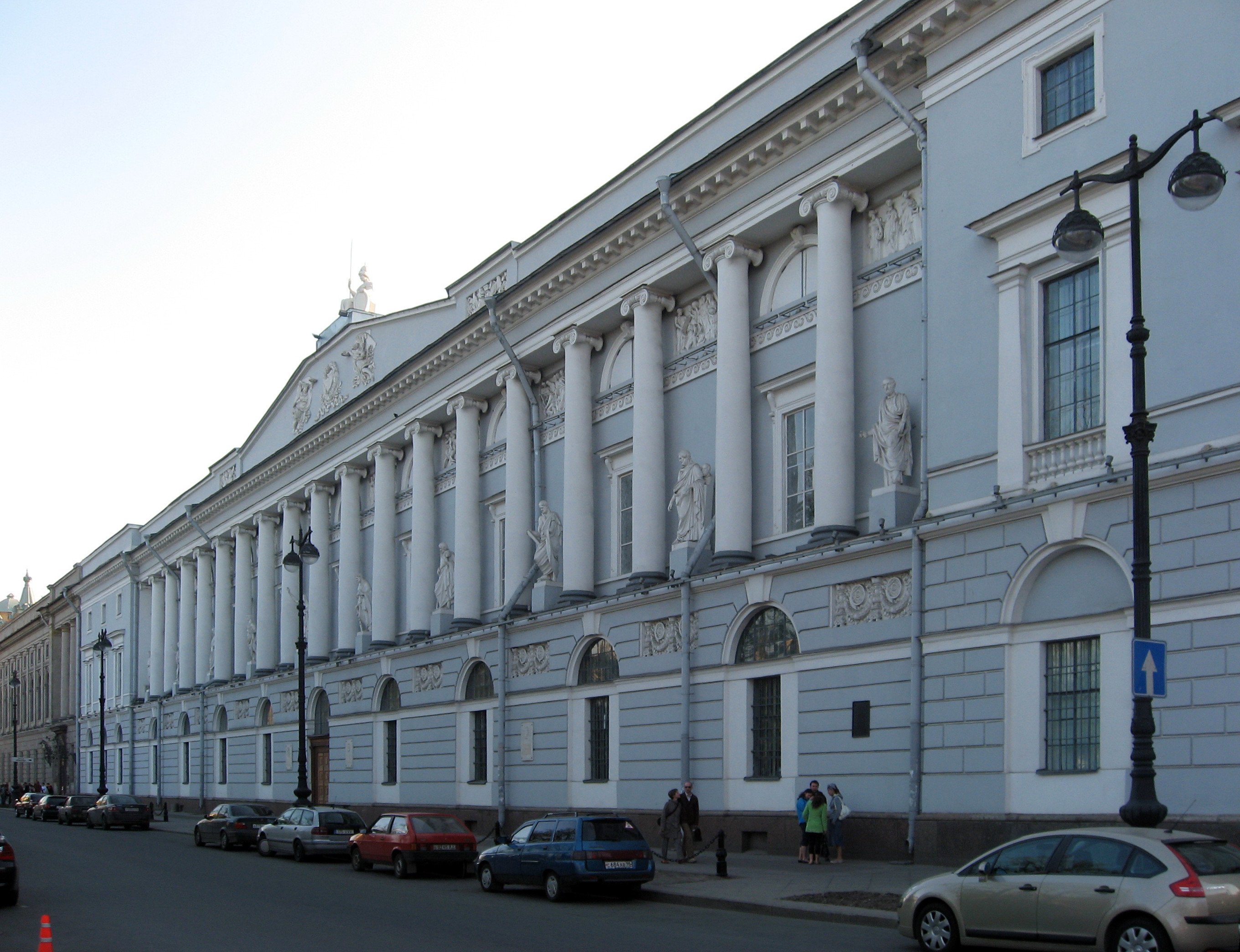
National Library of Russia, facade facing Ostrovsky Square

From 1796 to 1801, architect E. T. Sokolov built the first Public Library building at the corner of Nevsky Prospekt and Sadovaya Street. In 1828–1832, Carlo Rossi skillfully added a new library wing, creating a harmonious whole. Its 18-column facade (90 meters long), facing Ostrovsky Square, is richly decorated with sculpture. Statues of ancient scholars, philosophers, orators, and poets —Homer, Plato, Euclid, Euripides, Hippocrates, Demosthenes, Virgil, Tacitus, Cicero, and Herodotus— stand in loggias between columns. The facade is crowned by a statue of the goddess of wisdom, Minerva. The sculptures were created based on models by S. S. Pimenov, V. I. Demut-Malinovsky, S. I. Galberg, N. A. Tokarev, and M. G. Krylov. In 1896–1901, architect E. S. Vorotilov built a third library building with a reading room for 500 people. Its facade, treated to resemble granite, noticeably differs from Rossi's structures.

The entrance to the Russian National Library's reading rooms is now on Ostrovsky Square. As one of the world's largest libraries, it holds the most complete collection of Russian-language publications. Its collections include over 34 million books and documents in various languages, covering major fields of science and technology.

=== N. P. Vasin's house (house 5) ===
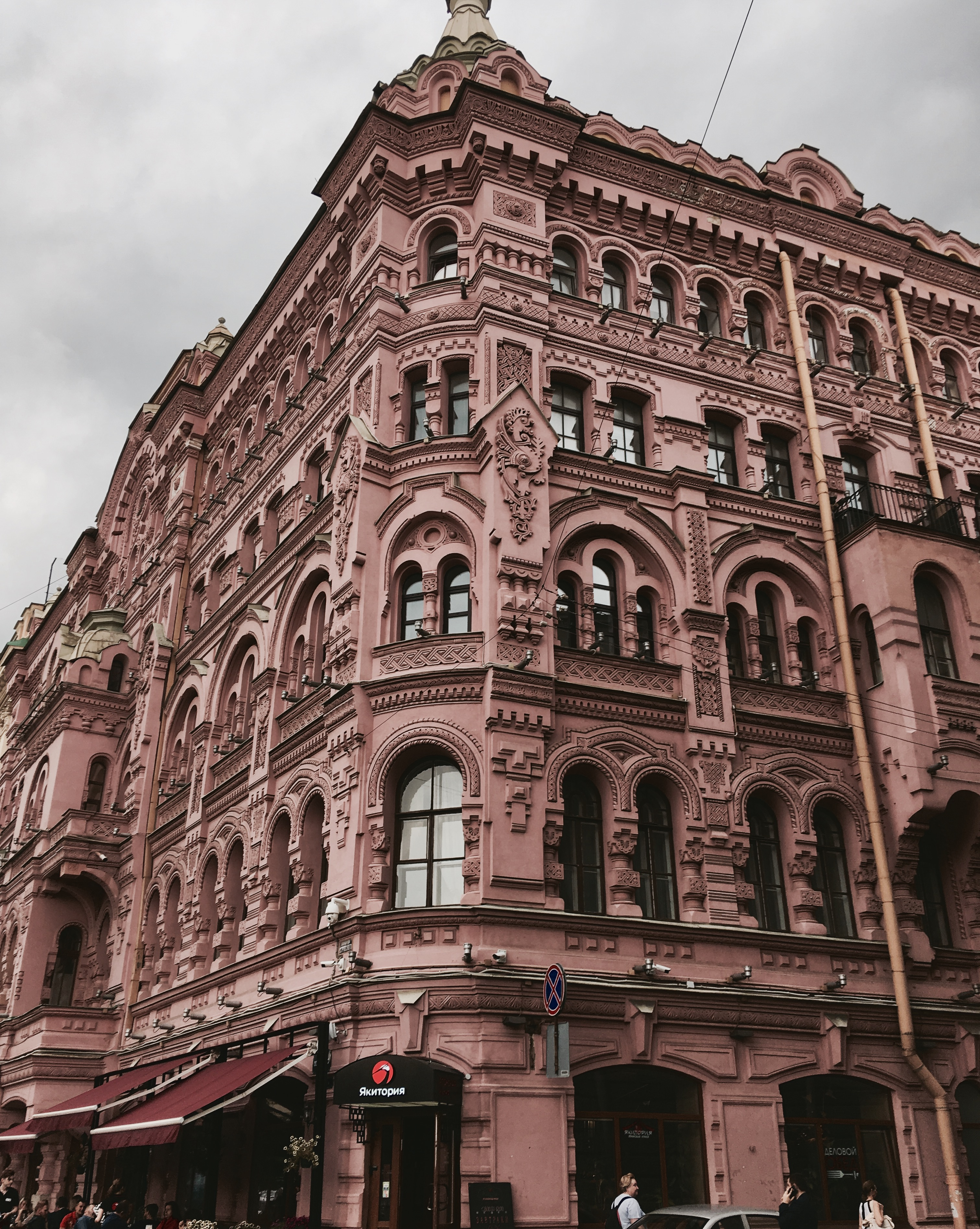
Facade facing Krylova Lane

The tenement house of architect N. P. Vasin, built in the Russian style in 1878–1879 based on his own design with participation from N. N. Nikonov. The five-story building has two facades with bay windows (especially the corner one) topped with turrets, adding volume. The facade features intricate details, varied window designs with carved "towels," cornice-topping kokoshniks, sandriks, and baluster-like columns. The facades are richly decorated with stucco mimicking Russian wood carving and embroidery motifs. It is a textbook example of disregarding the Alexandrinsky Theater ensemble's classicism, as its picturesque silhouette and ornate decor stand out from the surrounding buildings.

The renovated house is now home to Saint Petersburg's creative elite: actors and directors. Contemporaries called the house a "confectionery cake".

=== Saint Petersburg City Credit Society Building (house 7) ===
The three-story Saint Petersburg City Credit Society building was constructed in 1876–1879 in the Neo-Renaissance style by architect V. A. Schröter for the Saint Petersburg City Credit Society — the first non-governmental institution for long-term mortgage lending in the Russian Empire. The original project was later refined by E. F. Kruger and implemented by E. G. Jurgens. The building's appearance, designed for a financial institution, emphasizes solidity, reliability, and financial strength. Its layout ensured direct connections between all bank departments and convenience for clients with teller counters along the perimeter.

After the October Revolution, the building housed the Petrograd Provincial Department of Communal Services, and from the 1950s, the Lenmetrostroy Administration. Since 1993, the building has been leased by the Saint Petersburg Bank.

=== Russian Musical Society Building (House 9) ===
The four-story building was constructed in 1874 for the Imperial Russian Musical Society by architect E. I. Winterhalter. From 1876 to 1900, it housed the Slavic Charitable Society. It also served as the editorial office for the magazine "Fashion Herald," published from 1894 to 1916.

It is now a residential building. The ground floor houses the office of the Saint Petersburg Government's Housing Committee.

On March 16, 2007, a monument to a 19th-century janitor, sculpted by Yan Neiman from white marble, was unveiled in front of the building. It is planned to be relocated elsewhere.

Odd-numbered side of the square

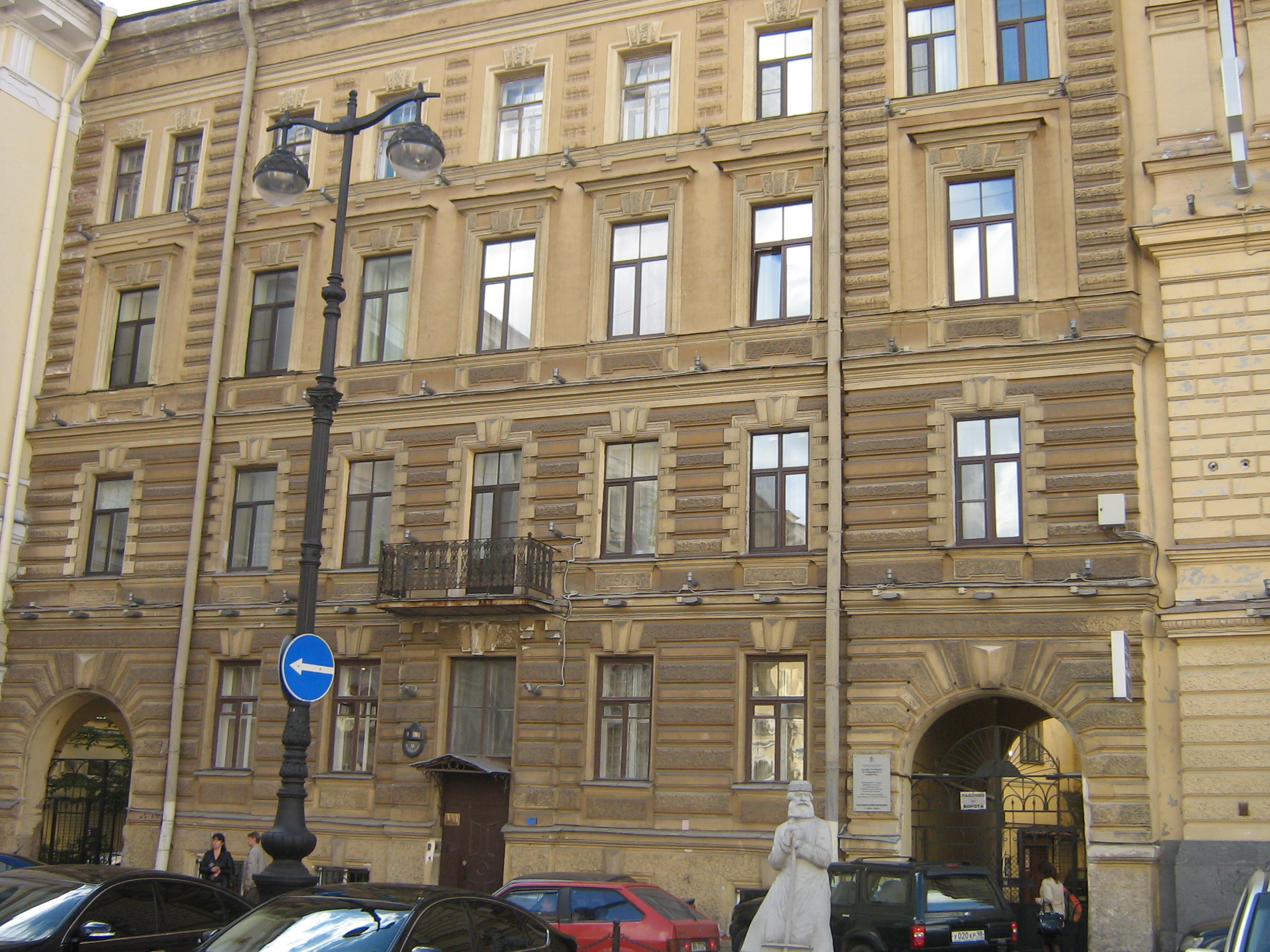
Russian Musical Society Building (House 9)

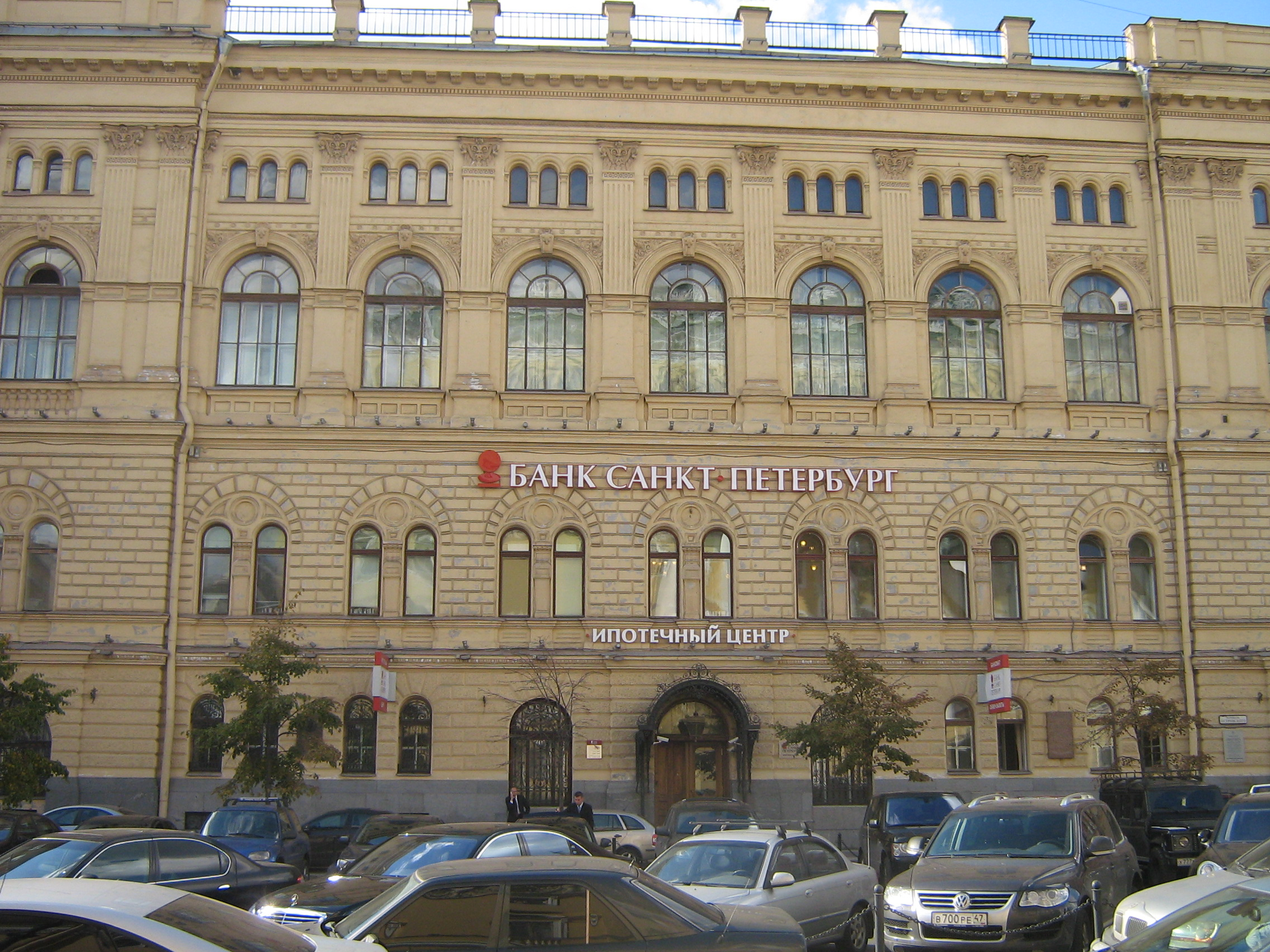
City Credit Society Building (House 7)

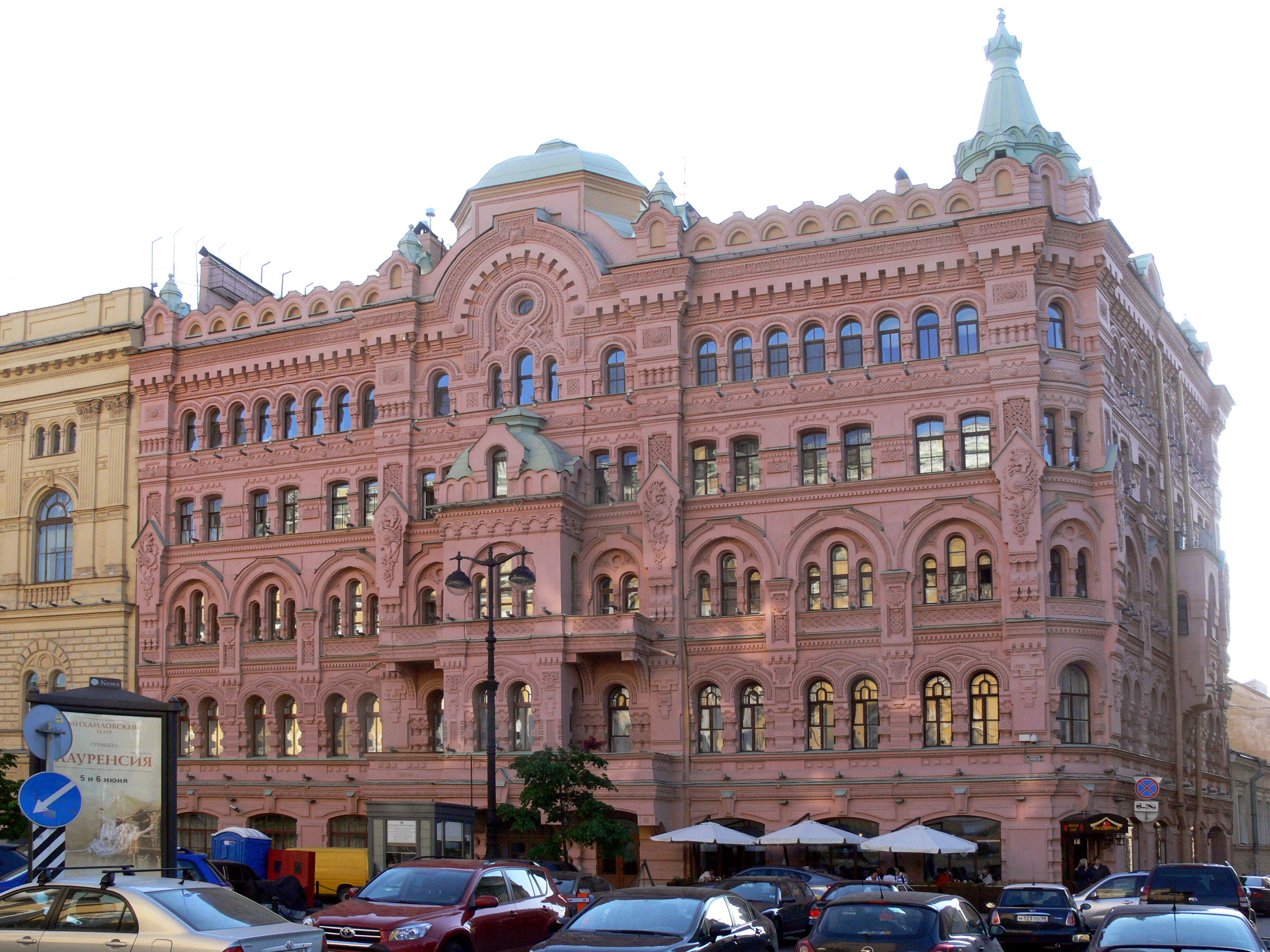
N. P. Vasin's House (House 5)

=== New hotel building ===
Since 2005, architect E. L. Gerasimov has been overseeing the construction of a new five-star, 71-room, seven-story hotel, 28 meters tall, in the style of an Italian palazzo made of light limestone. The first to third floors will house public spaces and an entertainment complex, the fourth to seventh floors will contain hotel rooms, and the basement will have a 20-car parking lot. The seventh, top floor is an attic with continuous glazing between pediments, housing apartments. The building uses natural granite and limestone, with wooden-aluminum framed double-glazed windows.

In 2012, the hotel building was purchased by Gazprom Export. It is currently being reconstructed into a Class A office building.

=== Building (House 2A) ===
A four-story building constructed in the 1980s.

=== Moscow-Vindava-Rybinsk Railway Administration Building (House 2) ===
It was built in 1911–1912 in the neoclassicism style by A. A. Grechannikov for the Moscow-Vindava-Rybinsk Railway. The building is clad in dark gray granite in a modernized neoclassical style, with facade decorations echoing empire motifs: lion masks, wreaths, garlands, and horns of plenty; figures of Glory crown the railway's monogram. It now houses the October Railway Administration.

Even-numbered side of the square

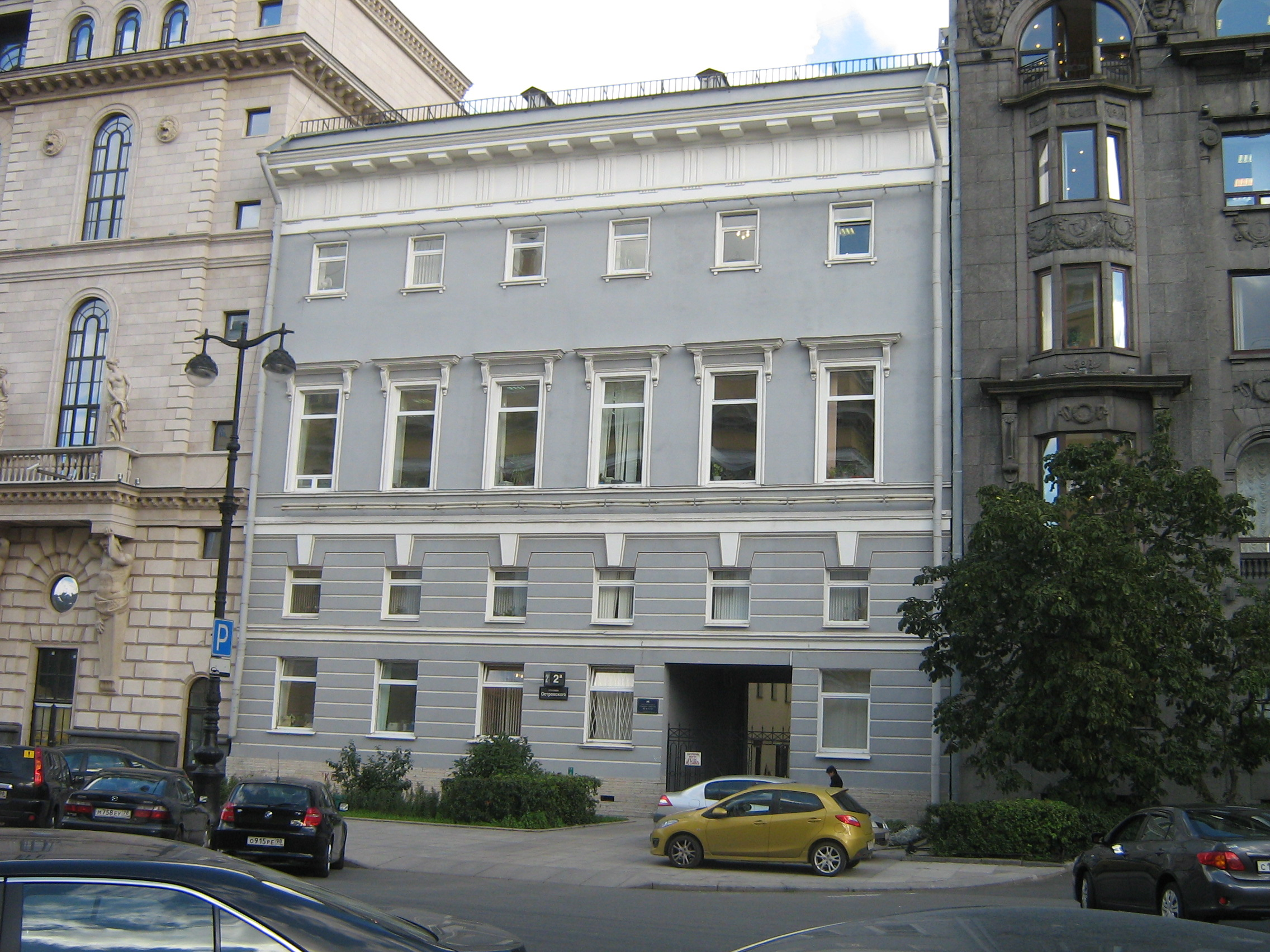
Building (House 2A)

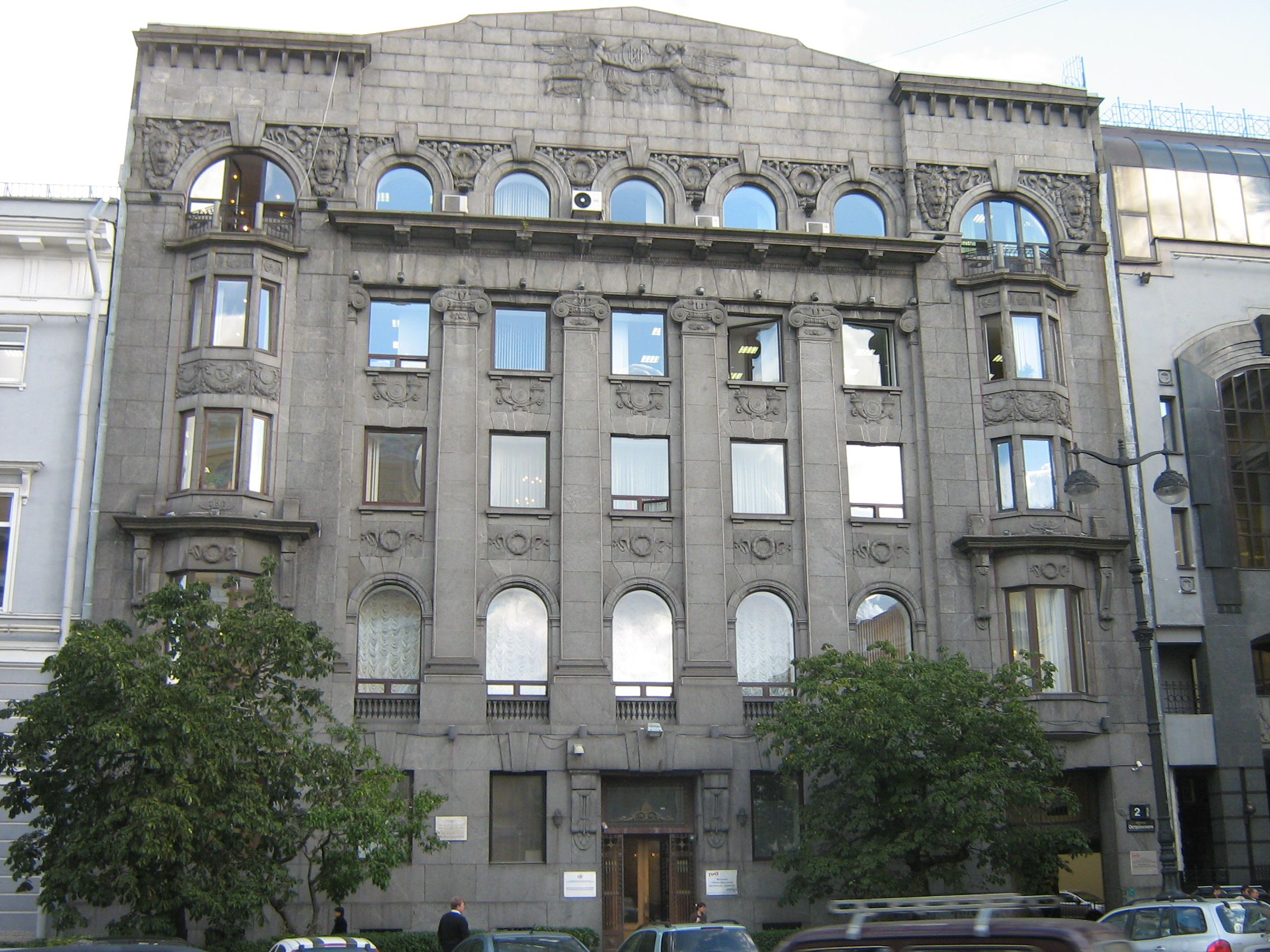
Moscow-Vindava-Rybinsk Railway Administration Building (House 2)

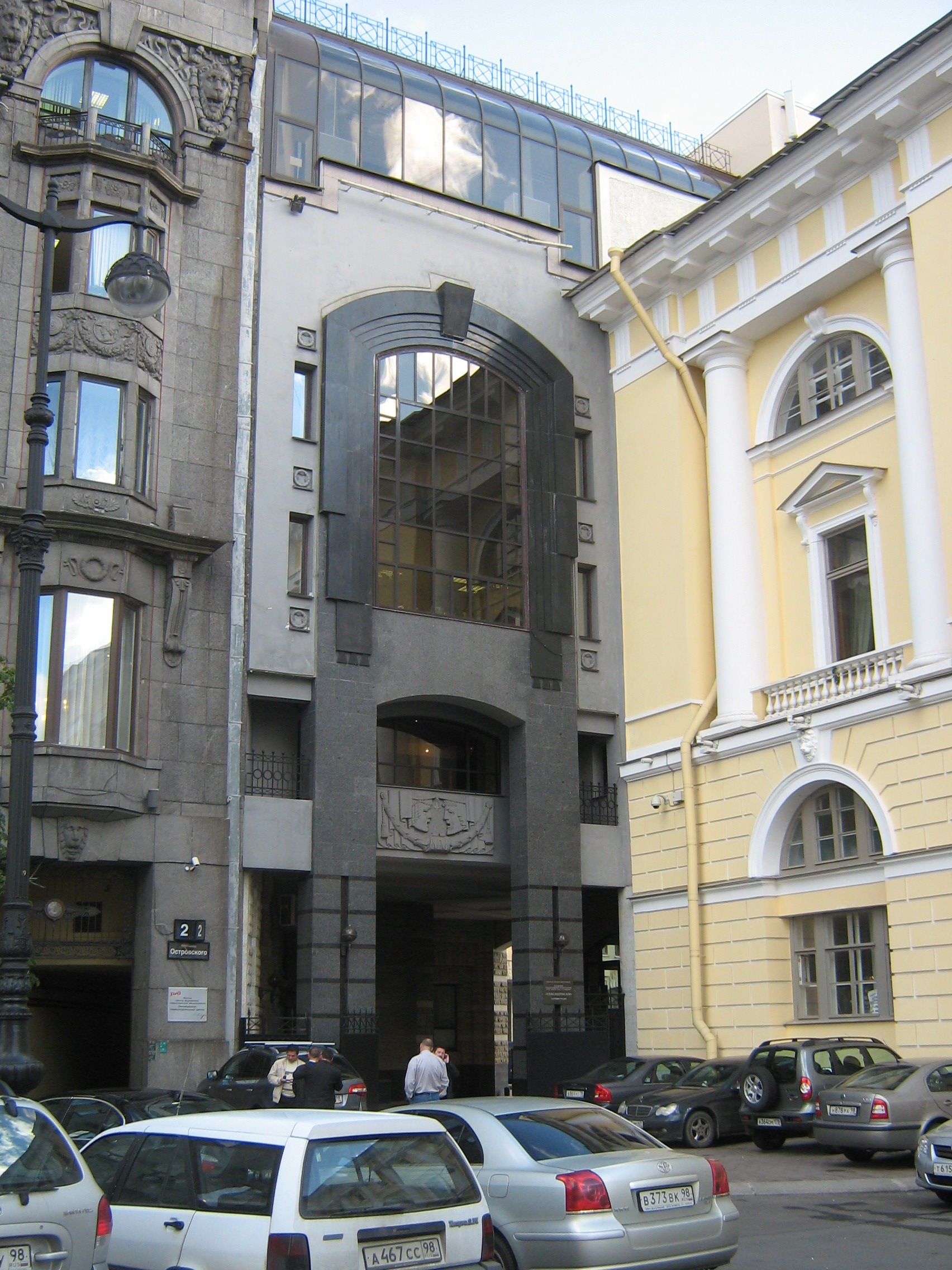
Corner Building (House 4)

=== Ministry of Public Education Building (House 11) and Directorate of Imperial Theaters Building (House 6) ===
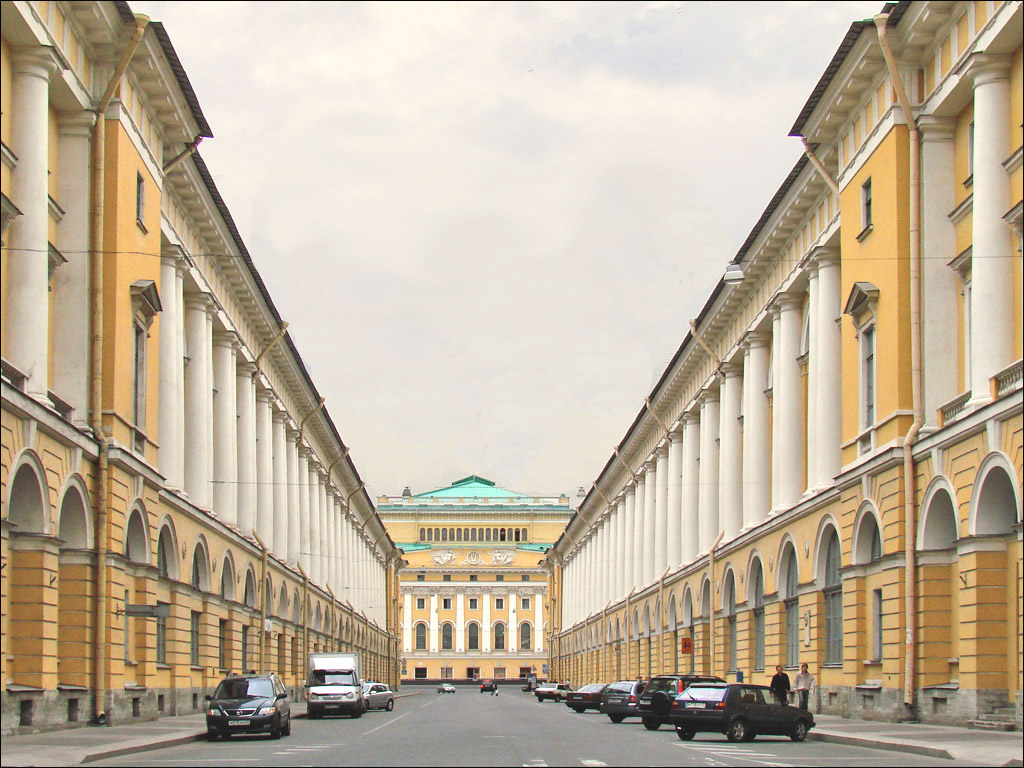
Zodchego Rossi Street from Lomonosov Square

Behind the Alexandrinsky Theater lies one of the city's most beautiful streets, named after its creator—Zodchego Rossi Street. It is formed by two identical administrative buildings constructed in 1828–1834 by architect Carlo Rossi. The facades are characterized by simplicity, severity, and concise architectural forms. The building on the odd-numbered side housed the Ministry of Public Education of the Russian Empire. It now houses the Saint Petersburg Government's Housing Committee and Committee on Investments and Strategic Projects.

The building on the even-numbered side housed the Directorate of Imperial Theaters of the Russian Empire. It now contains the Saint Petersburg State Museum of Theater and Music and the Vaganova Academy of Russian Ballet. The museum, established in 1908 (in this building since 1918), specializes in collecting and exhibiting materials related to the history of Russian dramatic and musical theaters. It offers tours, lectures on theater history, memory evenings, chamber concerts, meetings with prominent actors, musicians, and artists, and monodramas. The same building houses the Saint Petersburg State Theater Library. Established in 1756 as a repertoire library, its collections include over 700,000 items: rare and valuable editions, personal archives of theater figures, theater programs and posters, manuscripts, set and costume design sketches, rare theater periodicals, and unique photographs.

== Representations in literature and folklore ==
Ostrovsky Square is associated with the essay Ostrovsky Square. A Photo-Novel with Volker Schlöndorff by contemporary writer A. S. Ilyanen.

In the 19th century, a riddle poem playing with words emerged:

Where is such a lady standing:
Behind her there is a drama,
To her left—enlightenment,
To her right—entertainment,
But her front is not accessible to all?

There is the drama theater behind it, there is the Public Library on its left, and the leisure garden on its right, while in front of it there is the Eliseyev Emporium...) In the poem Far from You, Petersburg! by Nikolai Agnivtsev, the following lines are dedicated to Ostrovsky Square:

And the throne of Russia's Cleopatra
In her garden? And opposite
The Alexandrinsky Theater
An unshakable massif?

== Transport ==
No public transport passes directly through the square.

The nearest metro stations: The Gostiny Dvor station on the has an exit at the corner of Nevsky Prospekt and Sadovaya Street. This station connects to the Nevsky Prospekt station on the, and passengers on this line can also use this exit. The distance from the metro exit to the square's center is about 160 meters.

On Nevsky Prospekt near the square, there are public transport stops: Palace of Youth Creativity (on the odd-numbered side) and Gostiny Dvor Metro Station (on the even-numbered side). These stops serve buses No. 3, 7, 22, 24, 27, 181, 191; and trolleybuses No. 1, 5, 7, 10, 11, 22.

== Bibliography ==
- Gorbachevich, K. S.; Khablo, E. P. (1985). Почему так названы? [Why Are They Named So?]. pp. 277–278.
- Gorbachevich, K. S.; Khablo, E. P. (1996). Почему так названы? [Why Are They Named So?]. p. 190.
- Городские имена сегодня и вчера [City Names Today and Yesterday]. 1997. pp. 92, 164.
- Yurkova, Z. V. (2005). "Антон Антонович Модюи" [Anton Antonovich Modyui] (PDF). Реконструкция городов и геотехническое строительство [Reconstruction of Cities and Geotechnical Construction] (9): 264–278.
- Erofeev, A. D.; Vladimirovich, A. G. (2015). Скверы, сады и парки Петербурга. Зелёное убранство Северной столицы [Squares, Gardens, and Parks of Petersburg. The Green Adornment of the Northern Capital]. All About Saint Petersburg. Moscow, St. Petersburg: Tsentrpoligraf, Russian Troika-SPb. pp. 132–135. ISBN 9785227059987.
