= Alexandrinsky Theatre =

Theater in Saint Petersburg, Russia

Coordinates: 59.9318°N 30.3362°E

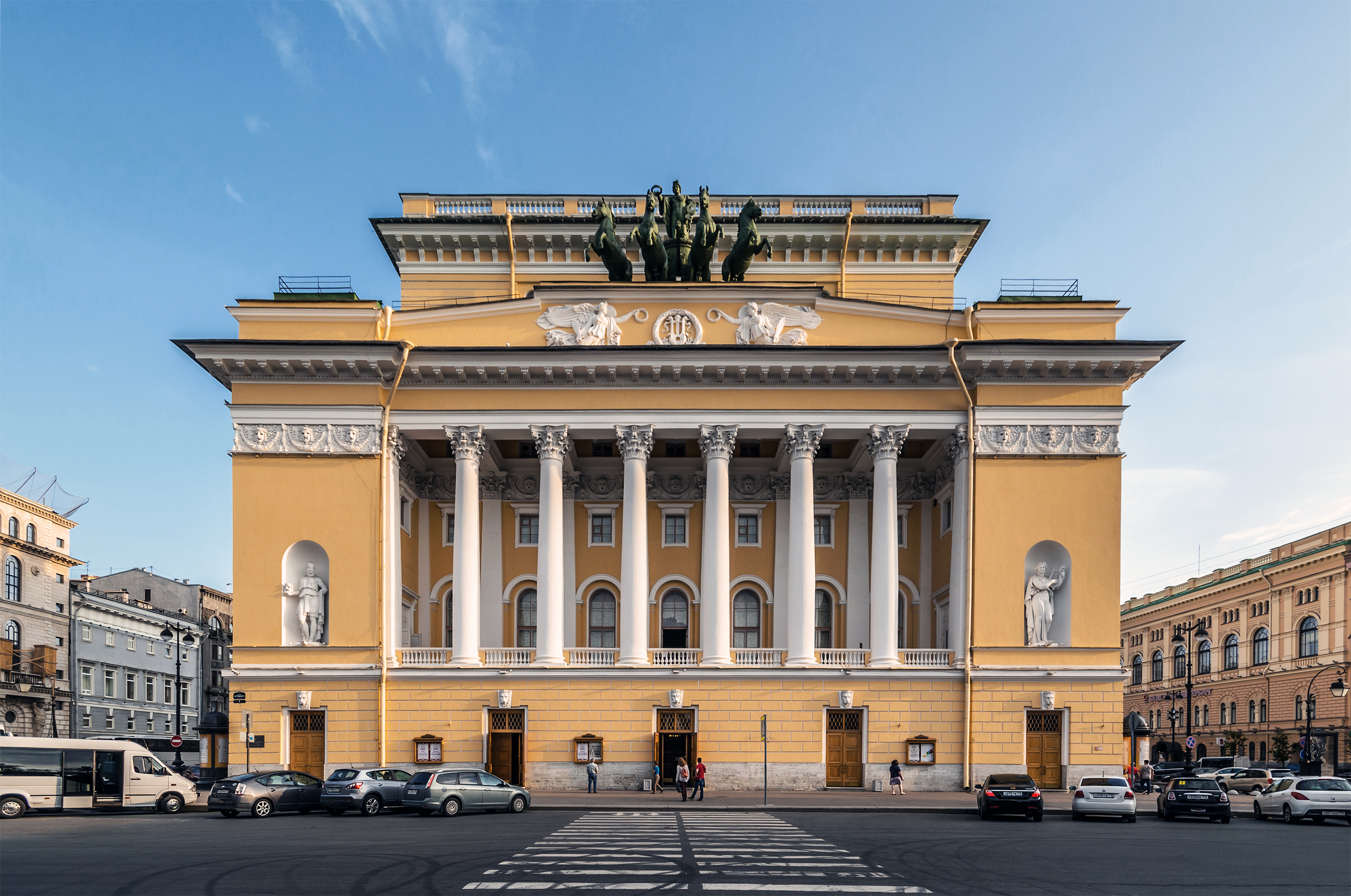
The theatre in 2014

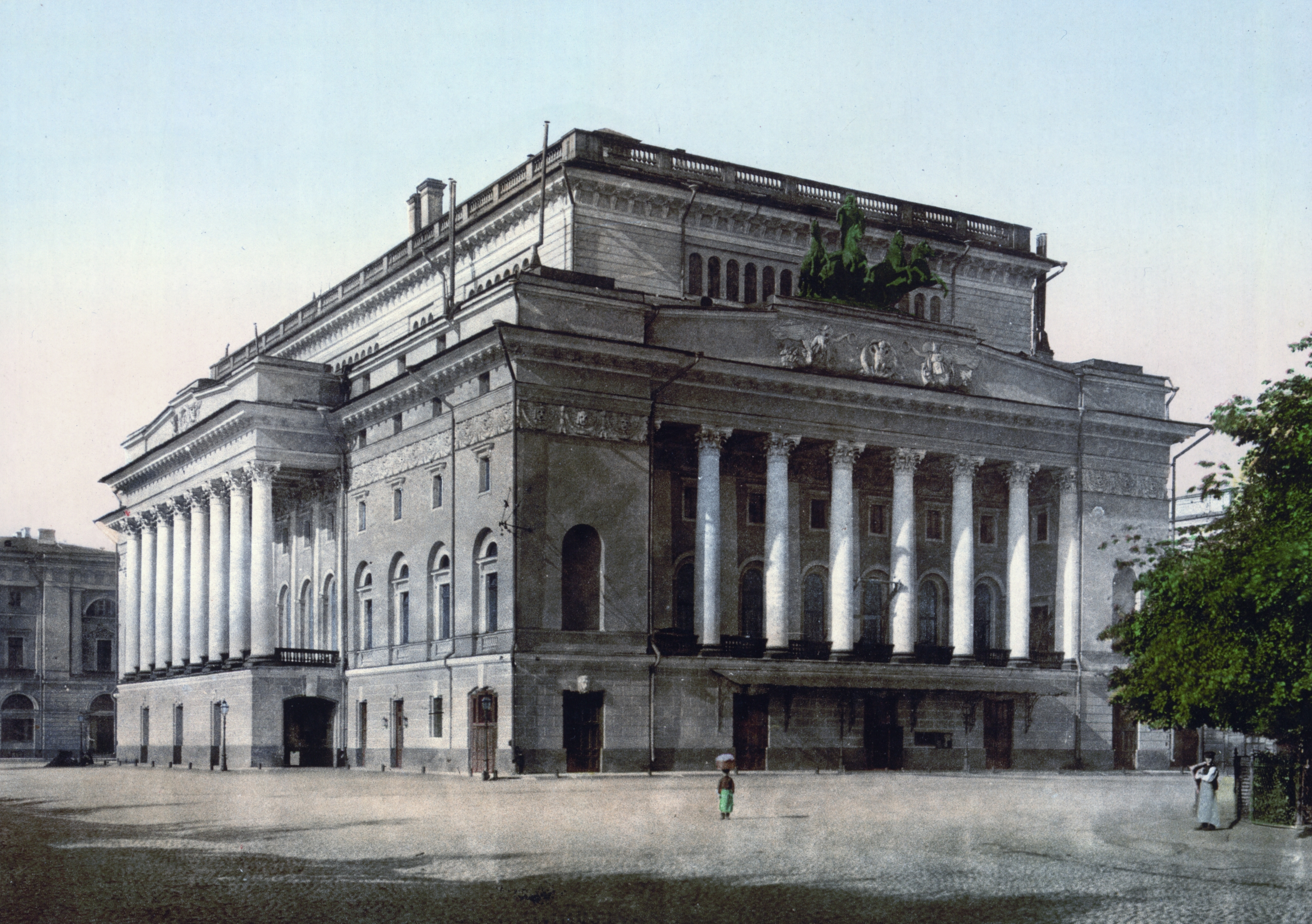
The theatre in the late 19th century

The Alexandrinsky Theatre (Russian: Александринский театр) or National Drama Theatre of Russia is a theatre in Saint Petersburg, Russia.

The Alexandrinsky Theatre was built for the Imperial troupe of Petersburg (Imperial troupe was founded in 1756).

Since 1832, the theatre has occupied an Empire-style building that Carlo Rossi designed. It was built in 1828–1832 on Alexandrinsky Square (now Ostrovsky Square), which is situated on Nevsky Prospekt between the National Library of Russia and Anichkov Palace. The theatre was opened on 31 August (12 September) 1832. The theatre and the square were named after Empress consort Alexandra Feodorovna. The building is part of the UNESCO World Heritage Site Historic Centre of Saint Petersburg and Related Groups of Monuments.

It was one of the many theatres of the Imperial troupe. Dramas, operas and ballets were on the stage. Only in the 1880s, the theatre has become dramatic and tragedy filled.

The premières of numerous Russian plays have been performed at the stage of the Alexandrinsky, including plays by Alexandr Griboyedov, Alexander Ostrovsky, and Anton Chekhov. Famous directors who have staged work there include Vsevolod Meyerhold, Grigori Kozintsev, Georgy Tovstonogov, and Nikolay Akimov.

On 30 August 2006 the theatre reopened after a reconstruction.
