= Victor Schröter =

Russian architect (1839–1901)

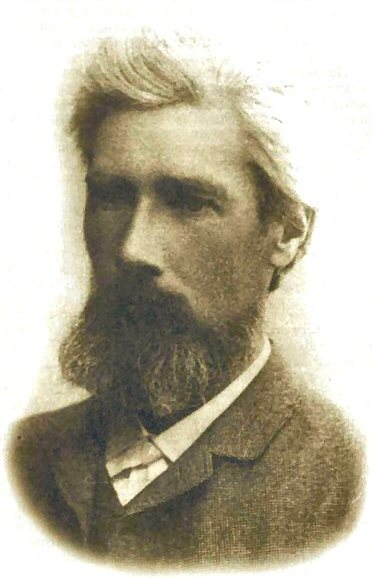
Victor Schröter

Victor Alexandrovich Schröter (Russian: Виктор Александрович Шрётер; 1839–1901) was a Russian architect of German ethnicity.

== Career ==
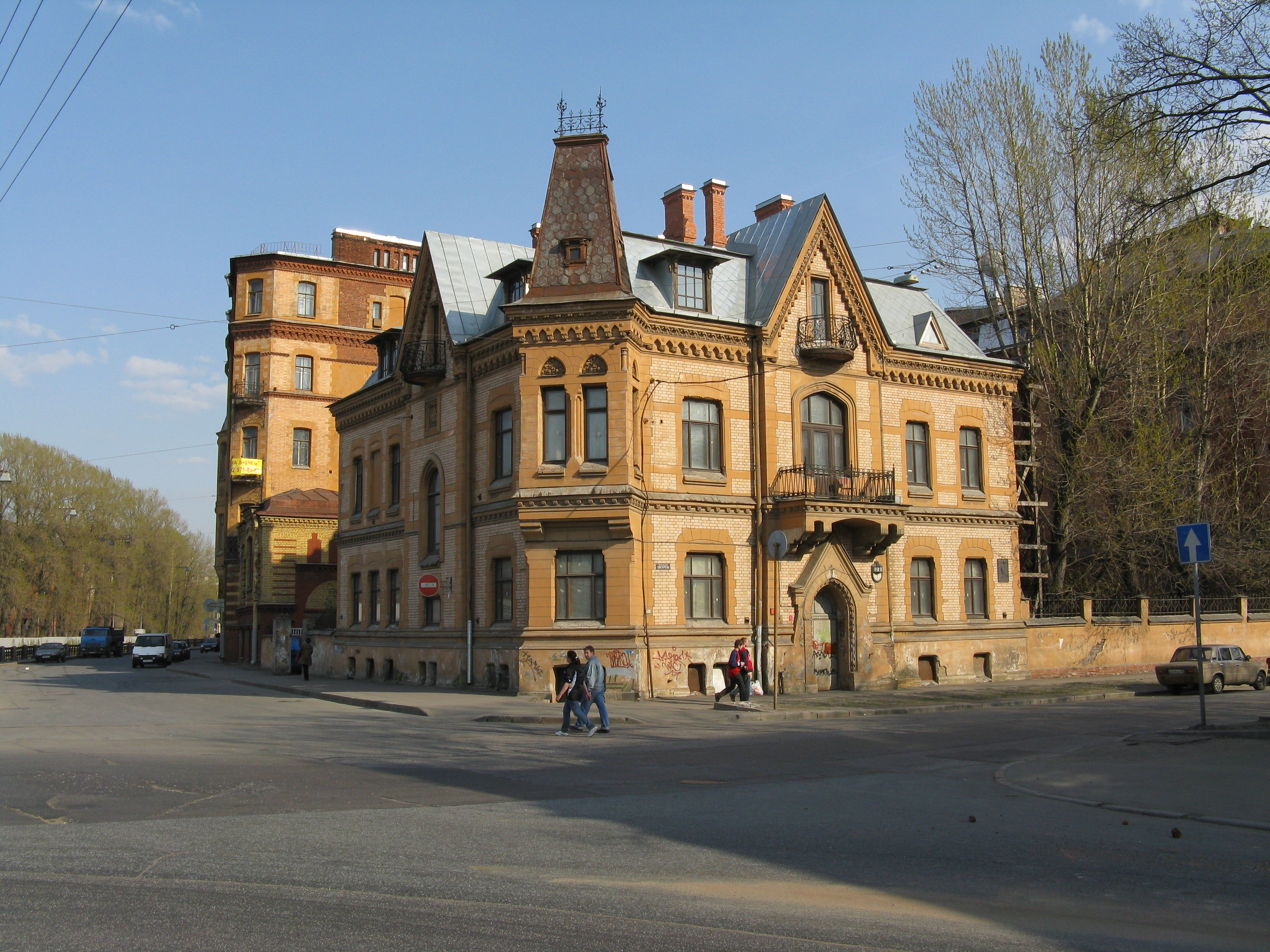
Schröter's house at the Moyka Embankment, designed by the architect

Schröter was born 27 April 1839, in St. Petersburg of Baltic German ancestry. His father was Alexander Gottlieb Schröter.

From 1851 to 1856, he attended the Petrischule run by St. Peter's Lutheran Church in Saint Petersburg. He then attended the Imperial Academy of Arts, followed by the Berlin Academy of Art from 1856 to 1862. At the end of his training there he received a gold medal, a rare honor for a foreigner.

In 1858, Schröter was admitted to the Architect's Association in Berlin. He then traveled and studied architecture in Germany, Belgium, France, Switzerland, Italy, and Austria. After returning to Saint Petersburg, he was invited to join the faculty of the Construction College.

In 1862, Schröter's work was submitted to the Imperial Academy of Arts, which awarded him the title of Artist, XIV Class. In 1864, for a project of ideas for the development of Saint Petersburg requested by the Duma, he was recognized as an Academician of Architecture. After that he occupied a prominent place among the architects of Saint Petersburg as both a theoretician and a practitioner, a champion of the rational direction of Eclecticism.

Schröter proved to be a master at designing structures of that were well-built but also economical. He designed many private houses featuring Russia's first use of facades built with natural stone and brick fired at high temperatures, without plaster - "Brick Style", a Russian variant of Art Nouveau - which influenced other architects and builders.

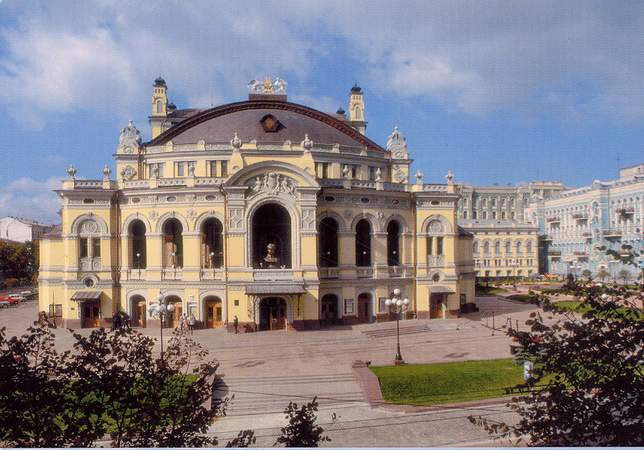
Schröter's Kiev Opera House

Schröter had in important role in the construction of the Palace of Grand Duke Vladimir Alexandrovich (now the House of Scientists) on the Palace Embankment in 1867 - 1885). He designed theatres in Kiev, Irkutsk, Nizhniy Novgorod and Tiflis and the Tbilisi Opera and Ballet Theatre; the Orthodox Church of Saint Sergius in Bad Kissingen, a grand theater which was planned for the Campus Martius in Saint Petersburg, and a railway station in Odessa.

Schröter's collaboration with Andrei Huhn won the competition to design the Alexander Nevsky Cathedral in Tiflis, but his design was judged too costly to execute and was replaced with one by David Grimm - whom Schröter later collaborated with on the colossal monument to Catherine the Great on Nevsky Prospect in Saint Petersburg.

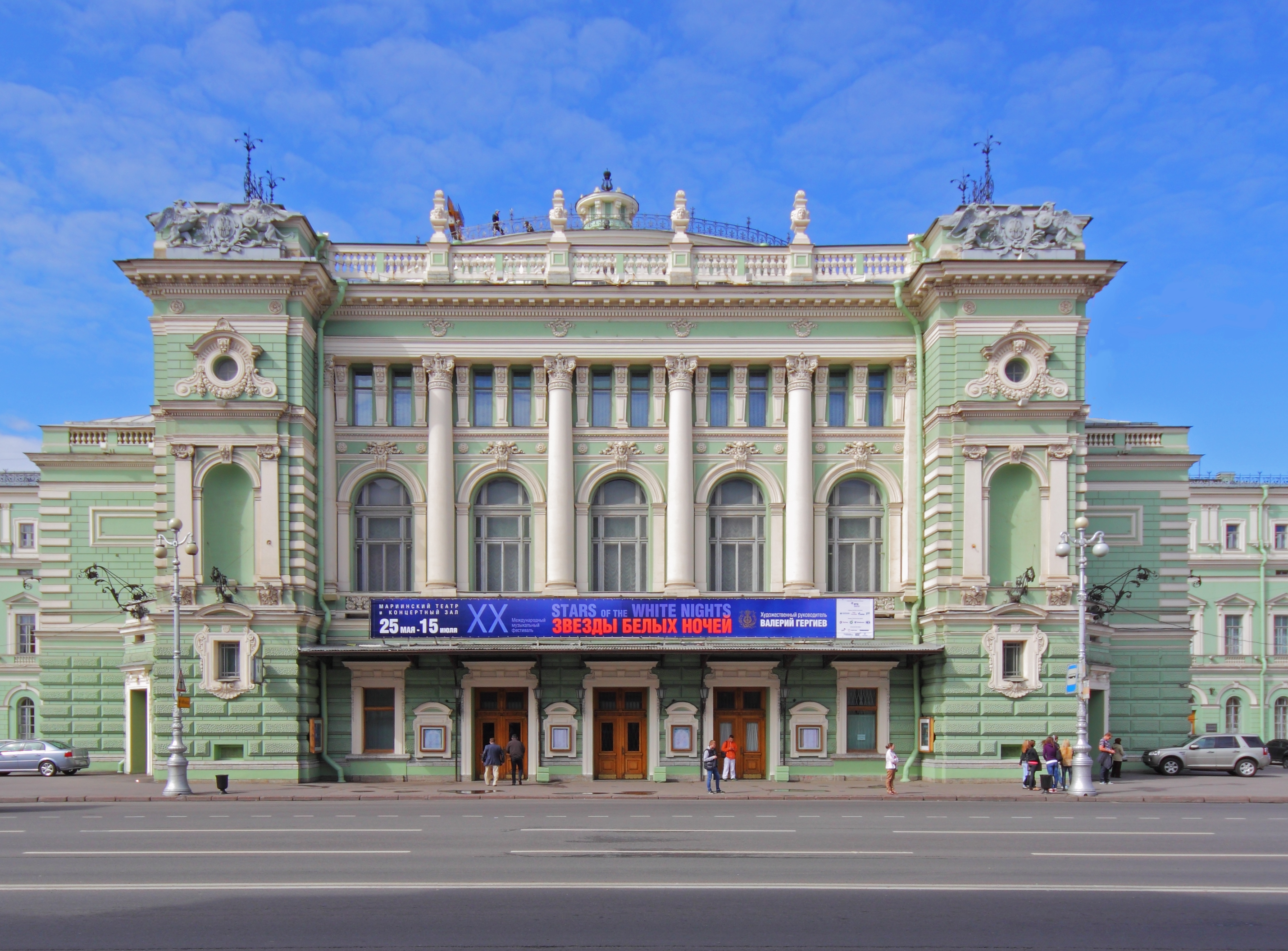
Mariinsky Theatre

Schröter rebuilt the facade of the Mariinsky Theatre after a fire in 1880, and as a token of gratitude for his work on the restructuring and expansion of the theater he was presented with a unique model of the theater, made of silver. During the Siege of Leningrad in World War II, his daughter Maria was forced to melt this down for the silver content.

Schröter remained almost until his death at the Institute of Civil Engineers (the new name of the Construction College after 1882). He was in public service from 1867, and on 30 August 1886, he was given the rank of Actual State Councillor, which gave him the privilege of hereditary nobility. Later he was given the rank of Actual Privy Councillor, which entitled him to be addressed as Your High Excellency.

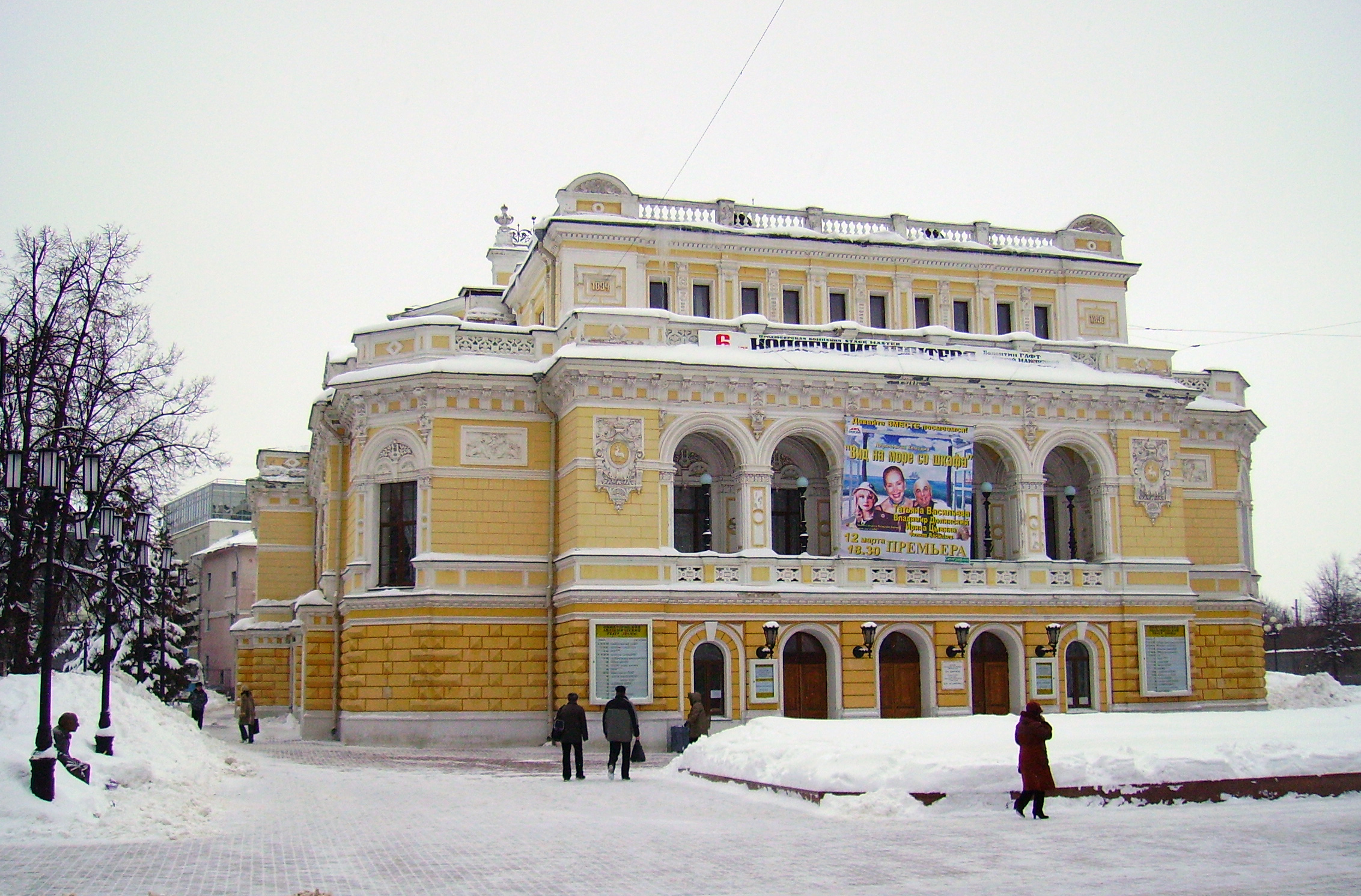
Schröter's Nizhny Novgorod Drama Theatre

Schröter was a senior architect in the Department of Principalities, chief architect of the Directorate of Imperial Theaters, an assistant inspector of the building department under His Majesty's Cabinet, and was a member of various committees, He took an active part in the establishment and work of the Saint Petersburg Society of Architects and was for some time the editor of its journal, Architect. For a time he also employed the Finnish architect Albert Mellin.

== Family ==
In 1869, on his 30th birthday, Schröter married Marie Christine Nissen (6 June 1844 - 4 June 1924). The couple had eight children, of whom two - Otto and George - became architects, and his daughter Maria an artist. His daughter Anna (Anna Ida Antonie Schröter) was born on 9 August 1877, in Saint Petersburg and died on 18 December 1940 in Neustadt in Prussia (now Wejherowo in Poland).

Schröter died on 16 April 1901, and is buried in the Smolensky Lutheran Cemetery in Saint Petersburg.

== Works ==
=== In St. Petersburg ===
- Ostrovsky Square: Monument to Catherine the Great. 1862–1873. Architecture by Schröter and David Grimm, sculptures by Mikhail Mikeshin, Matthew Chizhov, and Alexander Opekushin.
- Moskovsky Prospect, No. 95: Almshouse built for the Philistine Society. 1864 - 1870. Collaboration with Eduard Vergeym.
- Rimsky-Korsakov Prospect, No. 23: Private residence; No. 18 (Bolshoi Podyacheskaya Street): Apartment building (renovation). 1868 - 1869.
- Bolshaya Morskaya Street, No. 19: Building housing the construction firm I. A. Kumberga (rebuilding). 1868 - 1869.
- Gorohovaja Street, No. 46: Apartment building (renovation). 1871 - 1872. Collaboration with Igor Kitner.
- Fontanka Embankment, No. 183 (Labutina Street); No. 34 (Kalinkinsky Lane);; No. 1 - Apartment house and silk products factory of A. I. Nissen. 1872 - 1873. Collaboration with Igor Kitner.
- Sytninskaya Street: No. 11 (Kronverkskaya Street); No. 6: Lutheran Church of St. Mary and school building. 1872 - 1874. Collaboration with Igor Kitner. (demolished)
- Tchaikovsky Street, No. 65-67: Apartment house (extension). 1875 - 1876, 1885.
- Marat Street, No. 66 (Socialisticheskaya Street); No. 22: Apartment house of A. O. Meyer. 1876.
- Kavalergardskaya Street, No. 20: Apartment building. 1876 - 1877. (Overbuilt.)
- Ostrovsky Square, No. 7: Building of the Saint Petersburg City Credit Society. The initial draft was by E. F. Kruger and was implemented by Emmanuel Jurgens. 1876 - 1879.
- Rimsky-Korsakov Prospect, No. 7: Apartment building of G. F. Vuchihovskogo. 1877.
- Mohovaya Street, No. 28: Apartment building of A. I. Rozanov. 1878. Collaboration with Igor Kitner. (Overbuilt.)
- 1 Liniya, No. 4 (Repin Street); No. 3: Mansion of G. A. Korpusa (alterations and extension). 1879.
- Anglijskiy Avenue, No. 6: Mansion of A. K Pampelya. 1880 - 1881.

=== Georgia ===
- Tbilisi Opera and Ballet Theatre, 1896

=== Ukraine ===
- National Opera House of Ukraine, Kiev, 1901

== Gallery ==
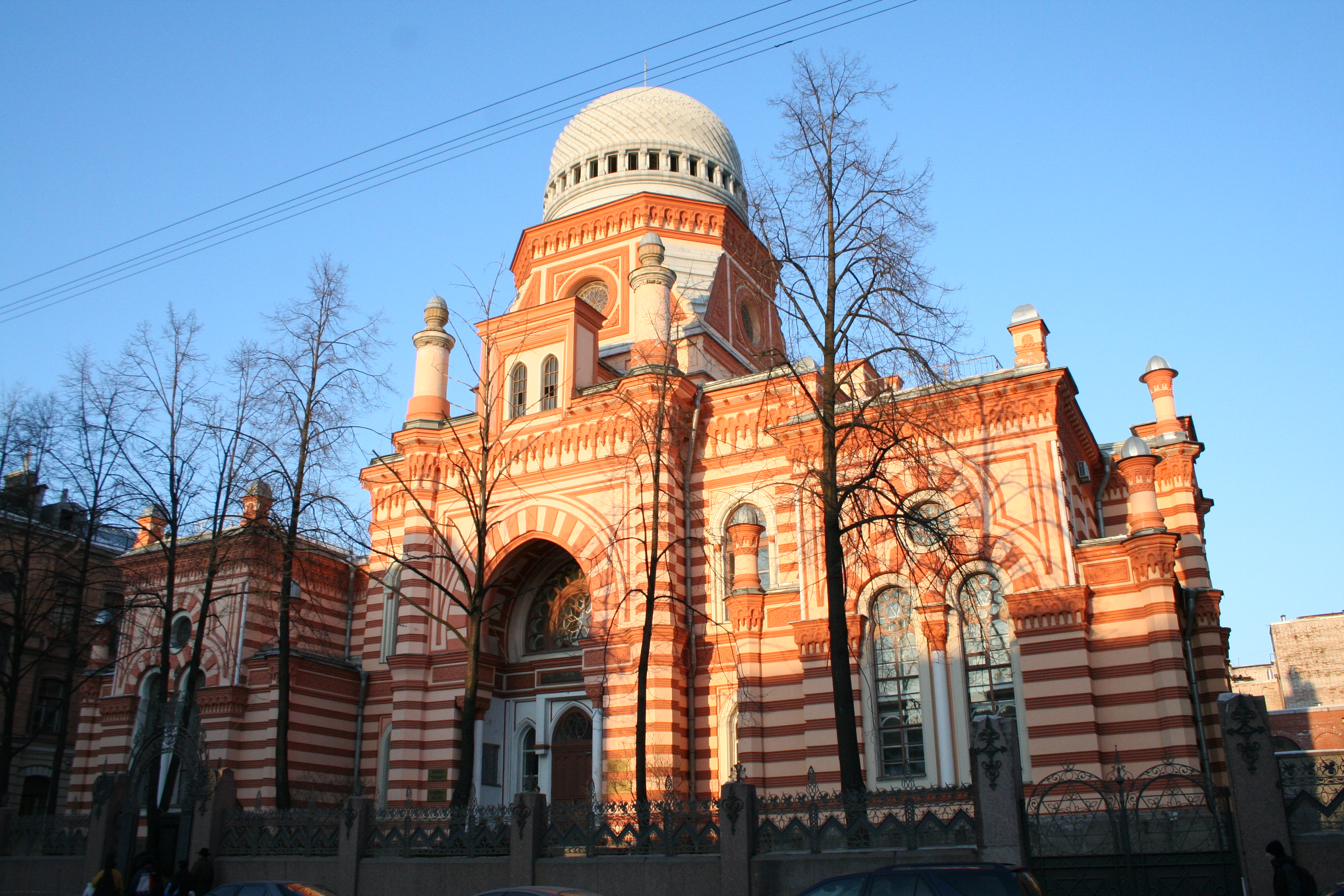
Saint Petersburg Great Choral Synagogue

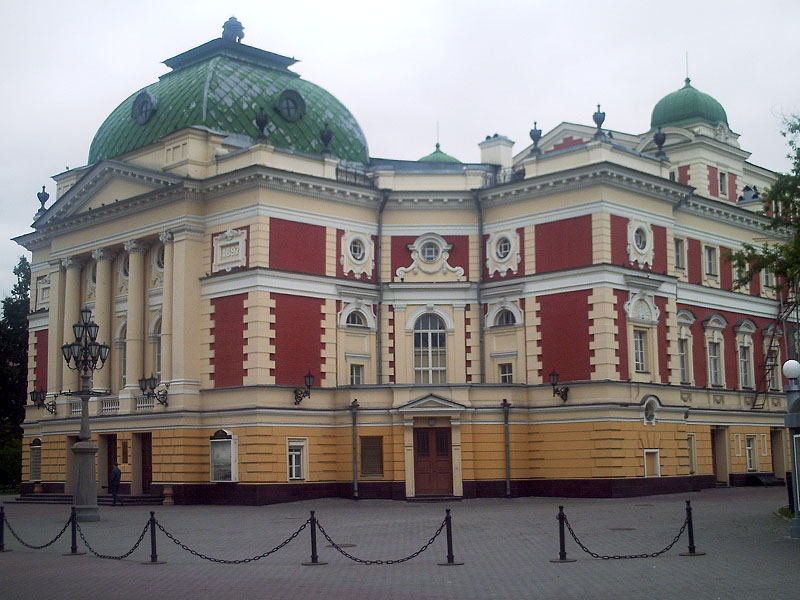
Okhlopkhov's Theatre Photo: Egor Kurlyuk

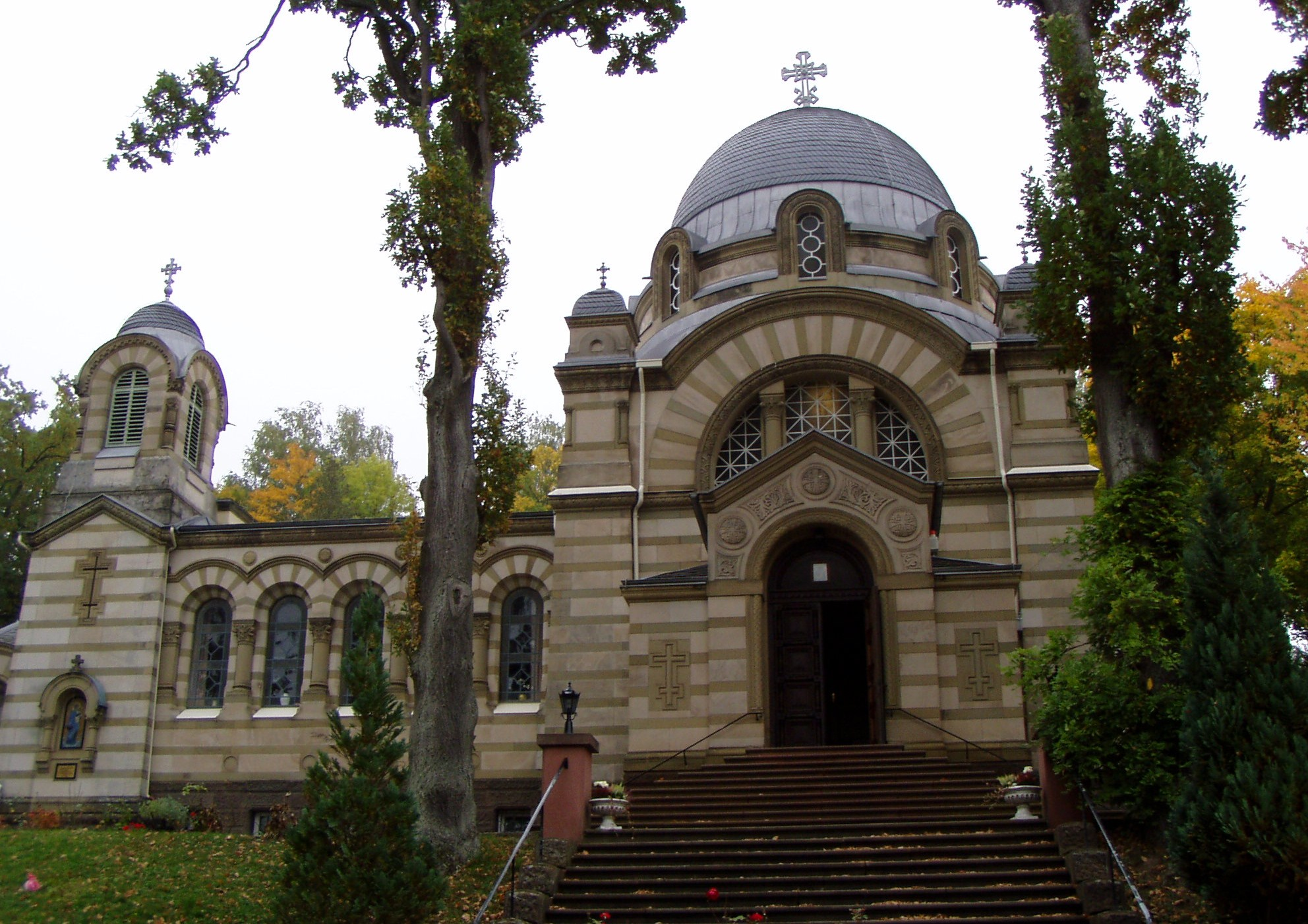
Orthodox church at Bad Kissingen

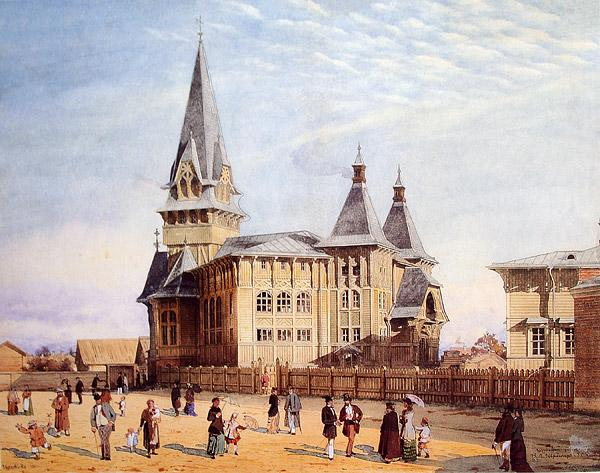
Painting by Albert Benois of Schröter's Lutheran Church of St. Mary
