= Georgian National Opera Theater =

Opera house in Tbilisi, Georgia

Coordinates: 41°42′4.7″N 44°47′46.2″E

Tbilisi State Opera and Ballet Theater named after Zacharia Paliashvili
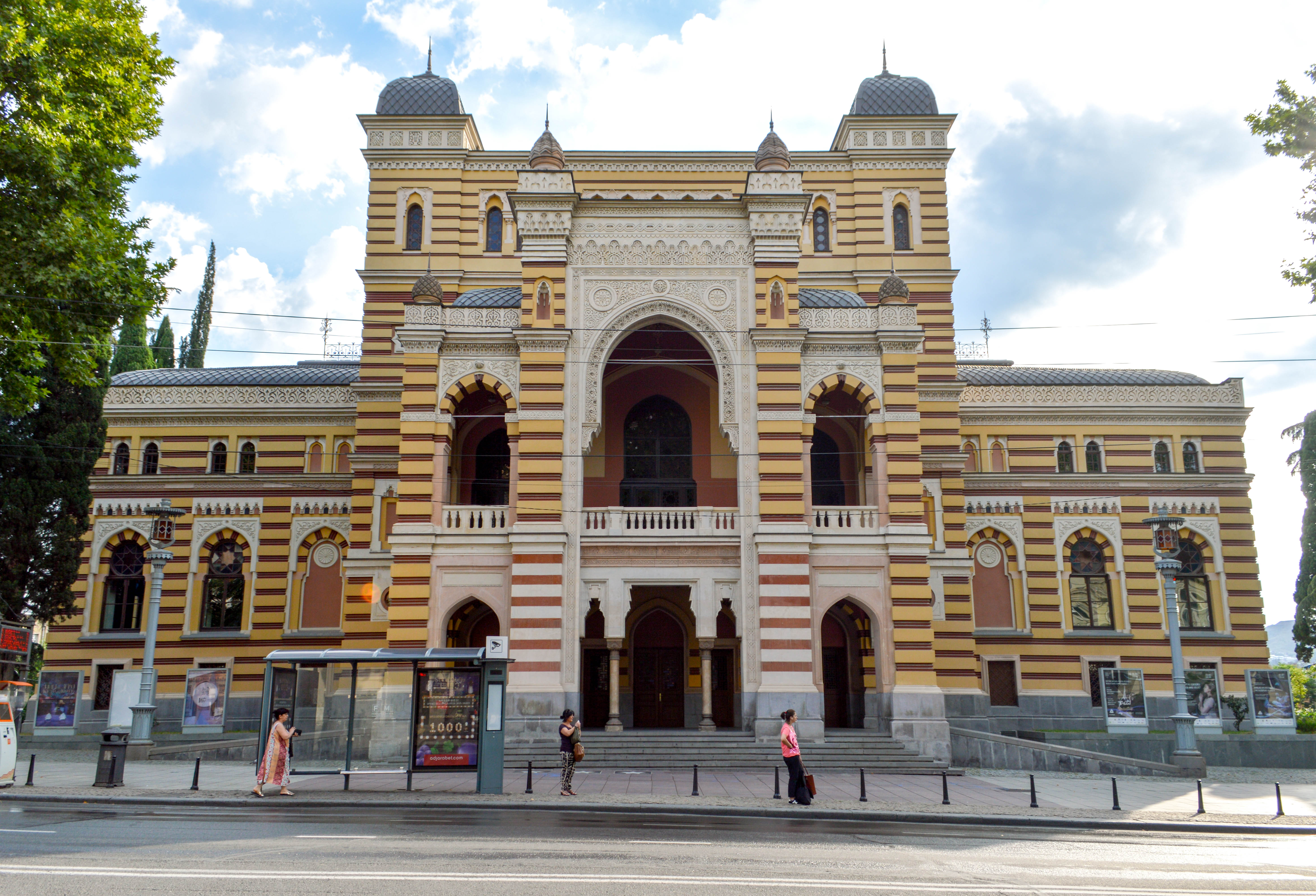
- Interactive map of the Tbilisi State Opera and Ballet Theater named after Zacharia Paliashvili area
- Former names: Tiflis Imperial Theater

General information
- Type: Performance venue
- Architectural style: Moorish Revival
- Location: 25 Shota Rustaveli Ave., Tbilisi, Georgia
- Named for: Zacharia Paliashvili (1937)
- Groundbreaking: 15 April 1847
- Completed: 1851
- Opened: 12 April 1851
- Inaugurated: 9 November 1851
- Renovated: 1896; 2016
- Owner: Municipality of Tbilisi

Design and construction
- Architects: Antonio Scudieri (original), Viktor Schröter (rebuild)

Website
- opera.ge

The Tbilisi State Opera and Ballet Theater named after Zacharia Paliashvili (Georgian: თბილისის ზაქარია ფალიაშვილის სახელობის სახელმწიფო ოპერისა და ბალეტის თეატრი, romanized: tbilisis zakaria paliashvilis sakhelobis sakhelmts'ipo op'erisa da balet'is teat'ri), shortly Paliashvili Theatre (Georgian: ფალიაშვილის თეატრი, romanized: paliashvilis teat'ri), is an opera house situated on Rustaveli Avenue in Tbilisi, Georgia. Founded in 1851, Tbilisi Opera is the main opera house of Georgia and is among the oldest opera houses in Eastern Europe.

Since 1896, the former Tiflis Imperial Theater has resided in an exotic neo-Moorish edifice originally constructed by Victor Johann Gottlieb Schröter, a prominent architect of Baltic German origin. Although definitively Oriental in its decorations and style, the building's layout, foyers and the main hall are that of a typical European opera house. Since its foundation, the theater has been damaged by several fires and underwent major rehabilitation works under Soviet and Georgian leadership; the most recent restoration effort concluded in January 2016, having taken six years and costing approximately 40 million U.S. dollars, donated by a Georgian business foundation.

The opera house is one of the centers of cultural life in Tbilisi and was once home to Zacharia Paliashvili, the Georgian national composer whose name the institution has carried since 1937. The Opera and Ballet Theater also houses the State Ballet of Georgia under the leadership of internationally renowned Georgian ballerina Nina Ananiashvili. In recent years it has hosted opera stars such as Montserrat Caballé and José Carreras, while also serving as a traditional venue for national celebrations and presidential inaugurations.

== Origin and socio-political underpinnings ==
The foundation of the Tiflis Imperial Opera was closely intertwined with the turbulent political processes in Georgia following the country's annexation by the Russian Empire in 1801. Georgia remained an uneasy and inadequately integrated part of the empire in the first half of the 19th century. Unhappy with Russian policies, the Georgian aristocracy plotted to overthrow the local Russian government in 1832. When their scheme was discovered, it led to numerous arrests and repressions in the years that followed. Anxious to reconcile the Georgian opinion in view of these lingering difficulties, the new Viceroy of the Caucasus, Count Mikhail Vorontsov, implemented a number of cultural initiatives, one of which was the foundation of the opera. The declared purpose of its establishment was to benefit the "public well-being" but it also served an important political goal of fully integrating the local Georgian aristocracy into the Imperial social life, thereby distracting them from any further anti-Russian conspiracies.

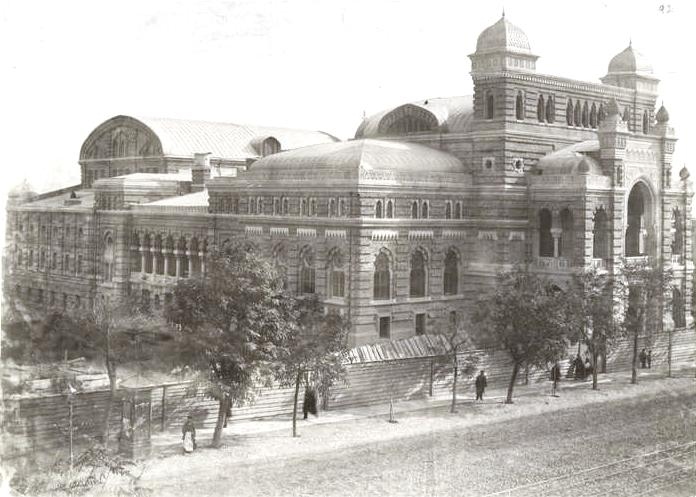
Tiflis theater in the late 1800s

To satisfy Georgians, Vorontsov went on to patronize Georgian-language theater performances and did everything Saint Petersburg would permit to win over locals. These types of efforts were particularly relevant in light of the ongoing Shamil's rebellion in the North Caucasus, which prompted some Russians to see Georgian aristocrats as the only bulwark protecting Russia's southern imperial borders. Vorontsov's conciliatory efforts were not without controversy, as not all Russians were enthusiastic about non-Russian contributions to the city's cultural development; some objected to Georgian-language productions and had them moved to different days, rather than precede regular opera performances as it was done up to that point.

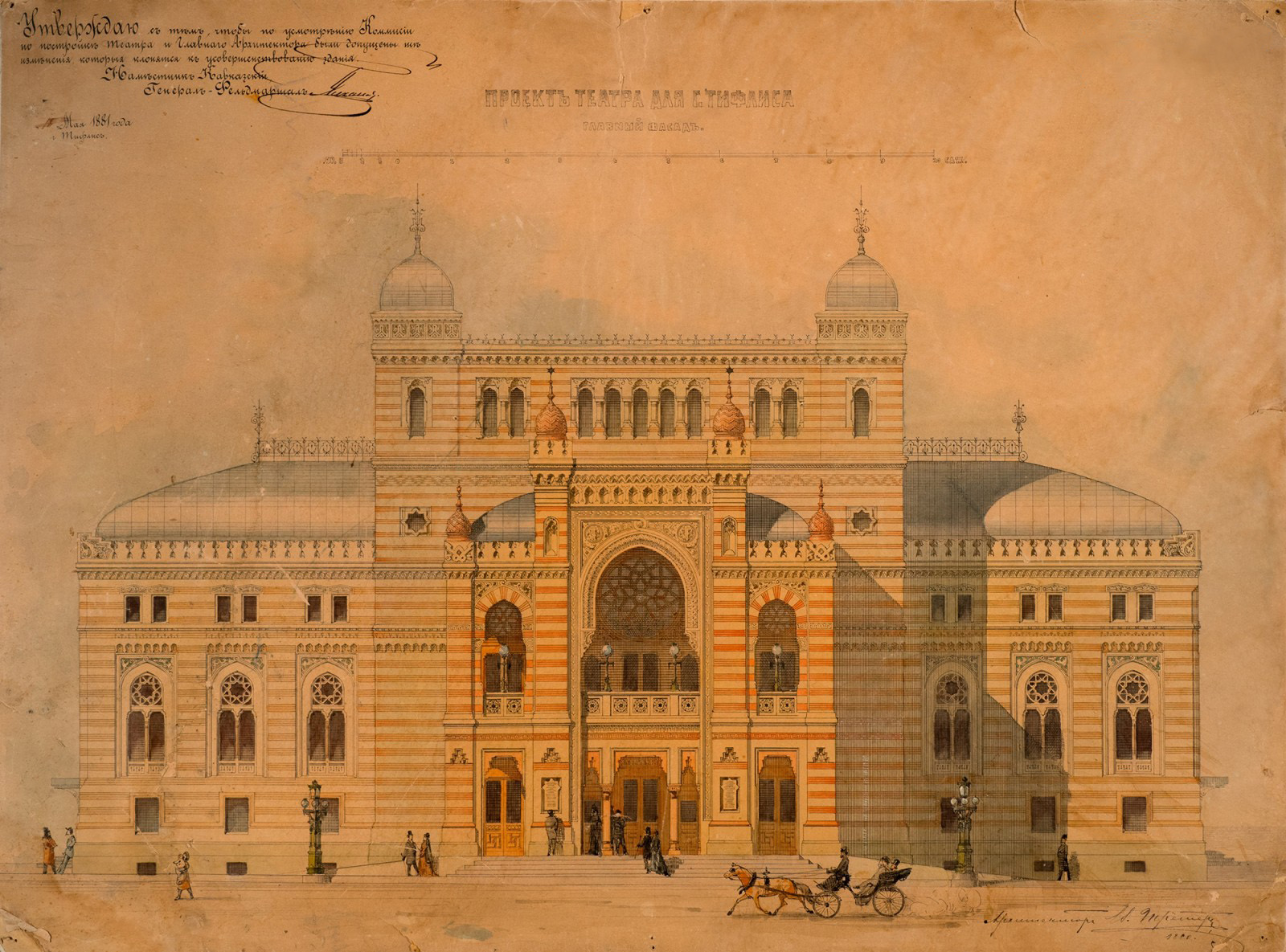
Tiflis theater draft made by Victor Schröter.

At Vorontsov's initiative, the original theater site was chosen on Rustaveli Avenue in Erivansky Square, an area the administration correctly envisioned would be the center of the expanding city. The land was given free of charge from the governor of the Tiflis Governorate, provided the theater would belong to the city.

The foundations of The Tiflis Imperial Theater were laid down on 15 April 1847. Italian architect Giovanni Scudieri, who had come to Tiflis from Odessa, was hired to oversee the project. The construction was completed in 1851. The interior of the theater was decorated by a Parisian designer, using colored velvet, gold and silver details, and expensive silks. A massive chandelier weighing 1,218 kilograms (2,685 lb), unassembled in 12 large boxes, was shipped by a steamer from Marseille to Kulevi on the Black Sea coast. Buffalo pulled the chandelier more than 300 kilometres (190 mi) to Tiflis. Russian painter Grigory Gagarin created the artwork for the theater and its first stage curtain. The second curtain was designed by Sergo Kobuladze in the 1950s. Vorontsov appointed writer Vladimir Sollogub as the theater's first director.

== Opening and the first performances ==
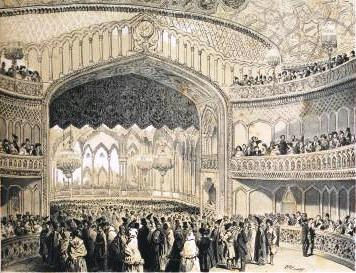
Grand opening, 12 April 1851

On 12 April 1851, the theater held its grand opening, attended by the high society of Tiflis. As the theater stage was not yet complete, the theater instead held a masked ball and charity fundraiser for the Saint Nino Women's College.

Several months later, the popular Parisian newspaper L'Illustration (issue 25 October 1851) printed a large article by Edmond de Bares with two pictures of the interior of the theater. The author wrote, "This is the only theatre in the city, the interior of which is totally Moorish in style, and is doubtless one of the most elegant, beautiful and fascinating theatrical constructions, conceived by man."

In the spring of 1851, the theater director invited an Italian opera troupe, which had been touring the Russian Empire under the conductorship of Francisco Asenjo Barbieri, to perform in Tiflis. The Italians traveled by carriage from Novocherkassk, but became ill and exhausted as they made their way into the Caucasus Mountains. By the time they reached Stavropol in southern Russia, they had lost all patience and refused to continue to Tiflis. Finally, they resumed, pausing often to rest as they traveled via the Georgian Military Highway, before arriving in Tiflis on 9 October 1851.

One month later, the first theatrical season officially opened in Tiflis with Lucia di Lammermoor by Gaetano Donizetti. After the spectacle, which had a great success, the hosts led Barbieri and the company to the left bank of the Kura River for a public feast, where people celebrated on boats for the whole night.

The Italians performed 12 different opera performances over the course of three months. As a consequence, the orchestra was enriched with new instruments and musical scores. Foreign orchestra performers came to Tiflis and some settled there.

== Fire and reconstruction ==
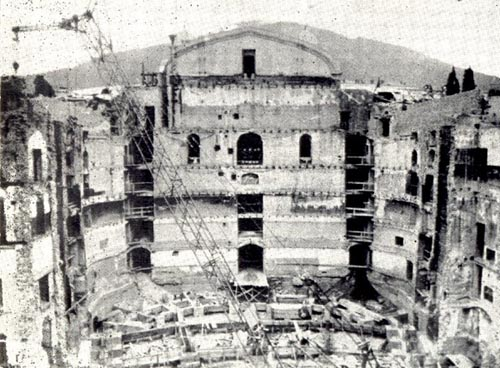
Theater following the devastating 1874 fire

On 11 October 1874, a fire began before a performance of Vincenzo Bellini's Norma. Though the fire brigade was across the street, the firefighters did not respond at first and did not bring ladders when they did, leading to outrage and accusations of the fire being intentional. The theater was completely destroyed, including the rich musical library, costumes, scenery, props and all of Gagarin's paintings.

Plans were made to rebuild the opera house. The theater decided to continue its season from the "Summer Theater", and returned 27 December with its production of Norma.

The city held a contest for a new architectural design. Viktor Schröter, an architect of German origin from Saint Petersburg, submitted the winning design. Construction of the new theater took years to get underway. There were repeated delays throughout the project, with the design not officially approved by Governor Grand Duke Michael Nikolaevich until 1880. Even after the construction began, it would sometimes come to a complete halt.

The theater finally reopened in 1896.

== 20th century ==
In 1937, the theater was renamed in honour of Zacharia Paliashvili, one of Georgia's national composers. Unrest and destabilization in Georgia in the 1990s affected the Tbilisi opera theater, as it did many others in the country. The government could not provide sufficient resources for the theater to function: this prevented the creation of new scenery or costumes, the recruitment of artists, and maintenance of the already vulnerable building. Following the Rose Revolution, however, the newly elected government improved the situation in opera as part of its cultural reforms.

== See also ==
- Rustaveli Theatre
- Tbilisi State Conservatoire
- Jansug Kakhidze
