= Nikolai Agnivtsev =

Russian poet, writer, and playwright

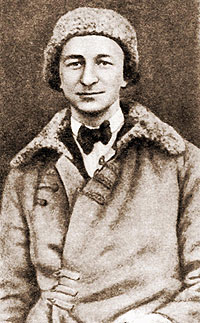
- Born: April 20, 1888; Moscow, Russian Empire
- Died: October 29, 1932 (aged 44); Moscow, Russian Empire
- Writing career
- Genres: poetry and children's books

Nikolai Yakovlevich Agnivtsev (Russian: Николай Яковлевич Агнивцев; April 20, 1888 – October 29, 1932), also known as Nikolai Agnivtsev, was a popular Russian poet, writer, and playwright.

Born into a noble family, Agnivtsev's father was a lawyer and chairman of the Judiciary of Russia. During his childhood, he frequently moved from place to place.

Agnivtsev began his publishing career in 1908, contributing to various publications including Birzhevyie Vedomosti, Novyi Satirikon, "Солнце России" (The Sun of Russia), and "Столица и усадьба" (Capitol and Estate). In 1917, after working in several cabarets, he established his own hand puppet theater called "Crooked Jimmy" in Saint Petersburg.

Due to the turmoil of the Russian Civil War, Agnivtsev went into exile in Berlin, Germany, from 1921 to 1922. It was during this period that he released his most renowned poetry collections: "Санкт-Петербург" (St. Petersburg) (1921) and "Блистательный Санкт-Петербург" (Brilliant St. Petersburg) (1923), which celebrated the artistic and aristocratic culture of the city.

Upon returning to Russia, Agnivtsev faced difficulties adjusting to the new political and social climate. He engaged in various endeavors such as publishing children's books, writing for magazines, and contributing to the circus. Notable among his children's books are "Чашка чая" (A Cup of Tea), "Винтик-шпунтик" (Screw Cog), "Маленький чёрный Мурзук" (Little Black Murzuk), and "Рикша из Шанхая" (Rickshaw from Shanghai). In 1926, Agnivtsev published his final collection of poems, titled "От пудры до грузовика" (From Powder to Truck).
