= Georgian Philharmonic Orchestra =

Symphony orchestra

- National symphony orchestra
- Native name: საქართველოს ეროვნული სიმფონიური ორკესტრი
- Former name: Georgian Symphony Orchestra; Evgeni Mikeladze Georgian State Symphony Orchestra
- Founded: 1925; 101 years ago
- Location: Tbilisi
- Music director: Nikoloz Rachveli

The Georgian Philharmonic Orchestra (საქართველოს ეროვნული სიმფონიური ორკესტრი, sakartvelos erovnuli simponiuri ork'est'ri) is the national orchestra of Georgia based in the capital Tbilisi. It was founded in 1925 as Georgian Symphony Orchestra, was named Georgian State Symphony Orchestra (Государственный симфонический оркестр Грузии). It was named after Evgeni Mikeladze from 1994, and received its current short name in 2013.

== History ==
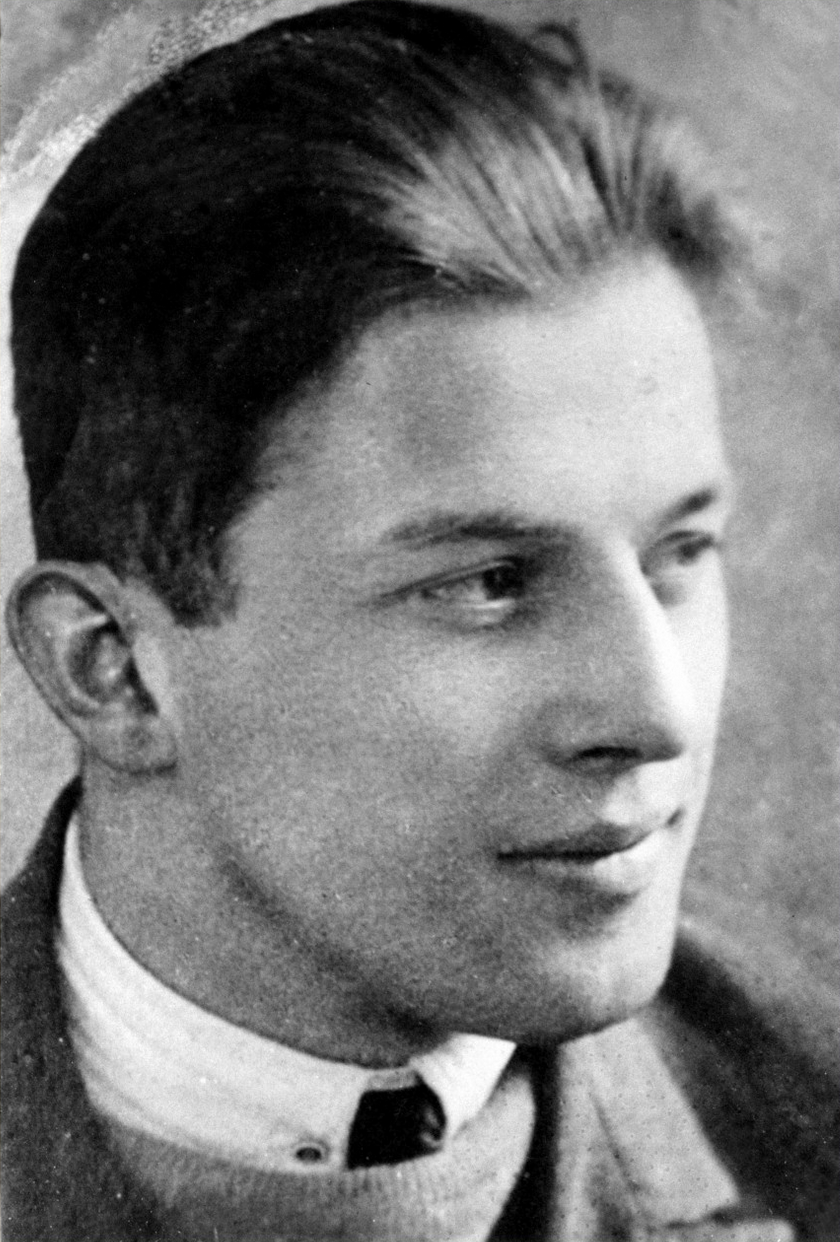
Evgeni Mikeladze, in whose honor the philharmonic is named

The orchestra was founded in Tbilisi in 1925; its first chief conductor was Ivane Paliashvili. It became the national orchestra of the Georgian Soviet Socialist Republic (GSSR) in 1933, and the country's leading symphony orchestra in 1933 when Evgeni Mikeladze was chief conductor. It was awarded the title Honoured Orchestra in 1971. In 1994 it was named after Mikeladze. Among its conductors were Grigol Kilaze, Alexander Gauk, Odysseas Dimitriadis, Jansug Kakhidze and Vakhtang Machavariani, and among its music directors were composers such as Andria Balanchivadze and Aleksi Machavariani.

From the beginning the orchestra's repertoire contained classical music and world premieres of music by composers from Georgia. The first six symphonies by Giya Kancheli were premiered in 1968 and 1980. The orchestra toured abroad and became internationally known, playing at the Berliner Philharmonie, the Concertgebouw in Amsterdam, the Salle Pleyel in Paris, the Konzerthaus Berlin, the Palais des Beaux-Arts de Bruxelles (BOZAR), and the Alte Oper in Frankfurt.

In 2005 the orchestra became part of the umbrella organization National Music Center of Georgia, the Mikeladze Center. Nikoloz Rachveli became artistic director then and chief conductor in 2007. In 2013 the National Music Center of Georgia was reformed. Many young musicians joined the orchestra, and an artistic council was formed, with Kancheli, Aleksandre Toradze, Paata Burchuladze, Ioseb Bardanashvili and Shalva Mshvelidze. The orchestra was given the right to elect its artistic director. The first election supported Rachveli in his functions.

The orchestra expanded their repertoire by music from film, pop and jazz. They played several soundtracks such as Corn Island in 2014. They performed with Björk in concerts in Tbilisi in 2017, conducted by Rachveli. In 2018 the orchestra toured to the Elbphilharmonie in Hamburg, playing music by Rachveli, Rachmaninoff and Kantscheli. They performed with the jazz vocalist Gregory Porter in Tbilisi.

Rachveli and the orchestra were named UNICEF Goodwill Ambassadors in Georgia in both 2017 and 2019. Katie Melua published Album No. 8 in 2020, in which the Georgian Philharmonic Orchestra participated. After the Russian invasion of Ukraine in 2022, the Georgian Philharmonic Orchestra played in solidarity concerts with music by Ukrainian and Georgian composers. In 2024 the orchestra played in the opening concert of the new concert hall, Georgian Philharmonic Orchestra Auditorium, a program with Beethoven's Seventh Symphony, conducted by Temur Kvitelashvili.
