= Vaja Azarashvili =

Georgian composer, pianist, and teacher (1936–2024)

- ვაჟა აზარაშვილი
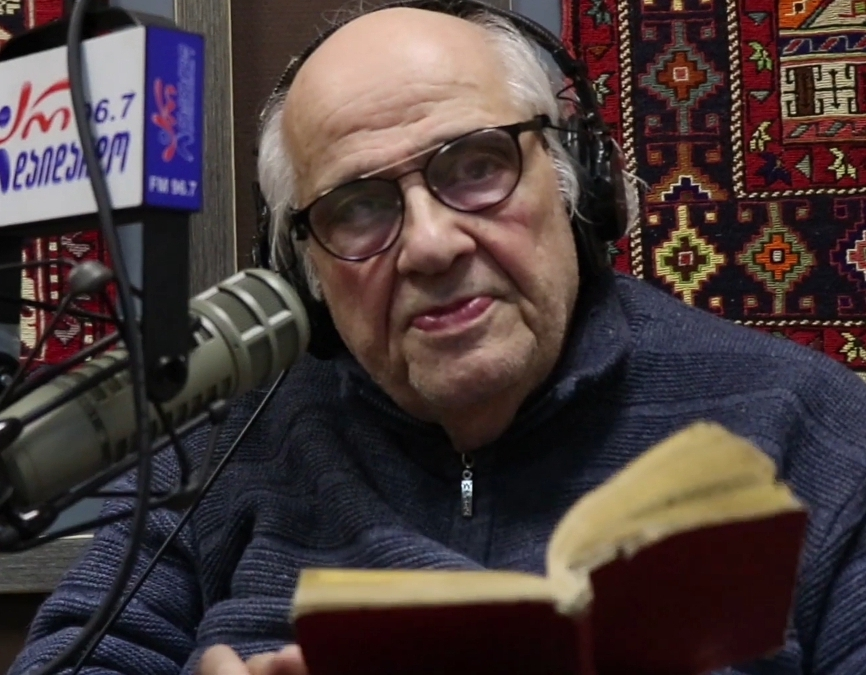
- Azarashvili in 2021
- Born: 13 July 1936; Tbilisi, Georgian SSR, Transcaucasian SFSR, USSR
- Died: 7 February 2024 (aged 87)
- Education: Tbilisi State Conservatoire
- Occupations: Composer; Pianist; Teacher

Vaja Azarashvili (Georgian: ვაჟა აზარაშვილი; 13 July 1936 – 7 February 2024) was a Georgian composer, pianist, and teacher. He was notably an Honored Worker of Art (1979), a People's Artist of the Georgian SSR (1988), a Knight of the Order of Honor (1998) and an Honorary Citizen of Tbilisi.

== Biography ==
Azarashvili was born in Tbilisi. His father, Shalva Azarashvili, was enthusiastic about folk music. Vaja attended the Tbilisi State Conservatoire under the tutelage of Aleksandre Shaverzashvili and Iona Tuskiya. He earned his post-graduate degree in 1961 under the direction of Andria Balanchivadze. He then taught at his alma mater and notably chaired the Union of Composers of Georgia from 1998 to 2007. He had one daughter, Natia Azarashvili.

In 1969, Azarashvili created a concerto for cello and the chamber orchestra. He expanded his repertoire in the 1970s and 1980s, venturing into operettas and ballet. In the 1990s, despite the poor economic situation in the newly independent Republic of Georgia, he created symphonic suites and several pieces for piano. He dedicated many songs to his native city of Tbilisi, some of which were performed by the likes of Nani Bregvadze, Giuli Chokheli, Vakhtang Kikabidze, Eter Kakulia, Tamara Gverdtsiteli, Merab Sepashvili, Orera, VIA Iveria, and Teatroni. His personal archives were saved in the Archival Fund of the National Center for Manuscripts. On 22 December 2011, his star was revealed in front of the Tbilisi State Concert Hall.

Vaja Azarashvili died on 7 February 2024, at the age of 87.

== Discography ==
- Важа Азарашвили – Песни Важа Азарашвили (1976)
- Важа Азарашвили / Рамаз Карухнишвили – Грузинская Камерная Музыка (1984)
- ვაჟა აზარაშვილი – სიმღერები (1985)
- ვაჟა აზარაშვილი – მე და ჩემი სიმღერა (1988)
