= Nikoloz Rachveli =

Georgian composer and conductor

- ნიკოლოზ რაჭველი
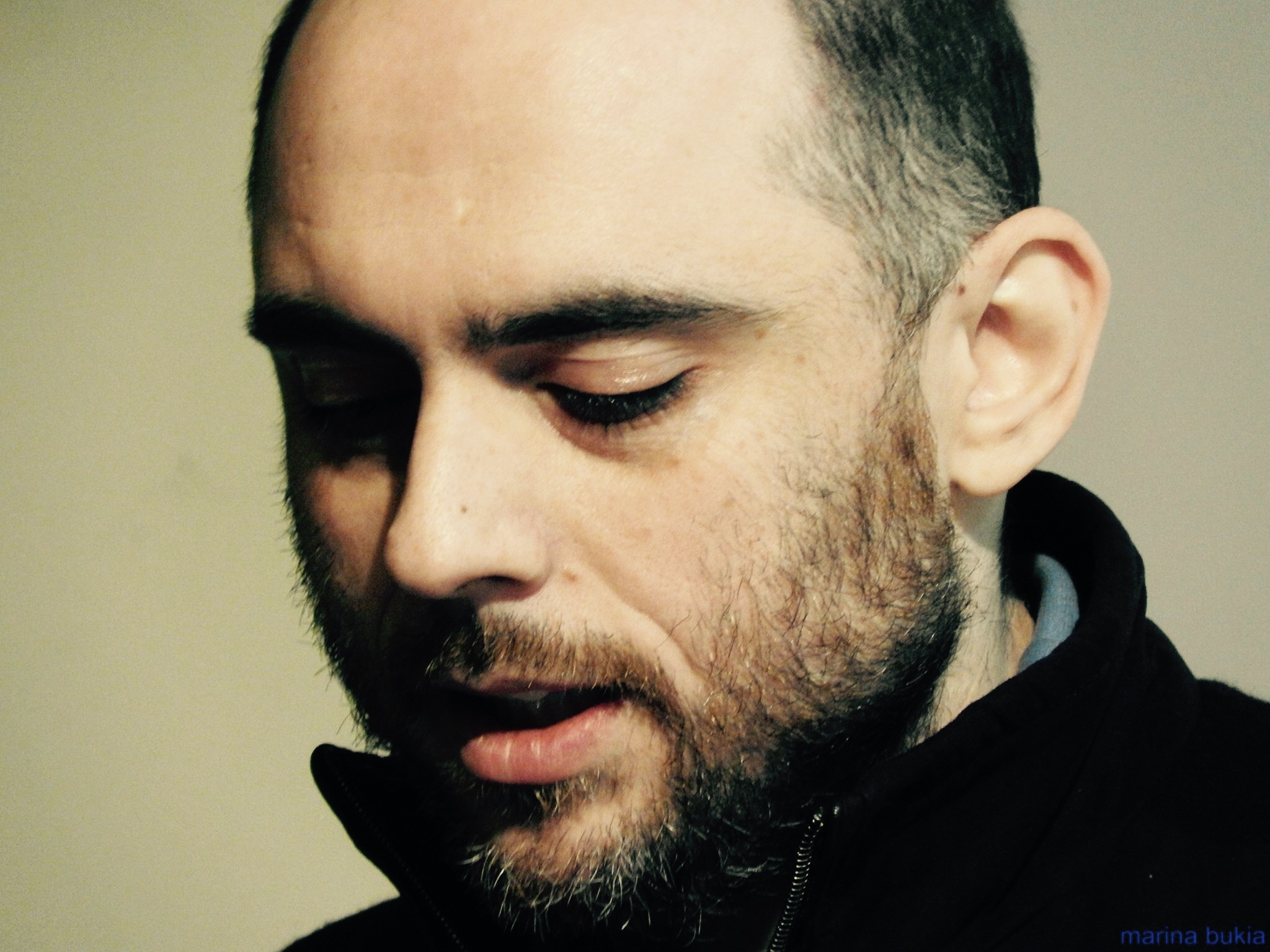
- Born: May 15, 1979 (age 47); Tbilisi, Georgian SSR, Soviet Union
- Education: Tbilisi State Conservatoire; University of Music and Performing Arts Vienna
- Occupations: Composer, conductor, arranger, pianist
- Years active: 1989–present
- Known for: General Music Director of the Georgian Philharmonic Orchestra

Nikoloz Rachveli (Georgian: ნიკოლოზ რაჭველი; born 15 May 1979) is a Georgian composer, conductor, arranger and pianist. He serves as the general music director of the Georgian Philharmonic Orchestra.

Rachveli has been noted for his leadership of the orchestra and for his work as both a composer and conductor. His compositions and arrangements have been performed by orchestras including the Rundfunk-Sinfonieorchester Berlin, Konzerthausorchester Berlin, Berlin Philharmonic, Orchestre National de France, National Philharmonic of Ukraine, Estonian National Symphony Orchestra, Georgian Philharmonic Orchestra, Slovenian Philharmonic Orchestra, Orchestra della Svizzera Italiana, Saint Petersburg Philharmonic Orchestra, Luxembourg Chamber Orchestra, Kremerata Baltica, Kyiv Camerata, Ivan Zajc Croatian National Theatre, and others.

His album City Lights, recorded with violinist Lisa Batiashvili and the Rundfunk-Sinfonieorchester Berlin and released by Deutsche Grammophon in 2020, features arrangements and compositions by Rachveli.

== Early life and education ==
Nikoloz Rachveli was born in Tbilisi, Georgia. His family originates from the Racha region of western Georgia, from which his artistic surname is derived.

He began his musical education at the Tbilisi Mikeladze Music School. His early teachers included Lili Gabunia and Mikheil Shughliashvili. Rachveli later studied composition at the Tbilisi State Conservatoire, graduating in 2005 under Georgian composer Bidzina Kvernadze.

From 1999 to 2003 he also studied at the University of Music and Performing Arts Vienna, where he attended masterclasses with composers including Pierre Boulez, Luciano Berio and Michael Jarrell.

== Career ==
Rachveli's career combines activities as a composer, conductor and performer. He has conducted numerous orchestras in Europe and beyond, including the Georgian Philharmonic Orchestra and other international ensembles.

As a conductor he has collaborated with artists including Michel Legrand, Sting, Gidon Kremer, Yuri Bashmet, Kim Kashkashian, David Geringas, Elisabeth Leonskaja, Sergei Nakariakov, Chris Botti, Miloš Karadaglić, Sheku Kanneh-Mason, Khatia Buniatishvili, Lisa Batiashvili, Anita Rachvelishvili, Alexander Toradze, Gregory Porter, Paata Burchuladze, Katie Melua, Lisa Fischer.

Rachveli has led the Georgian Philharmonic Orchestra in performances at venues including the Elbphilharmonie in Hamburg, the Konzerthaus Berlin, Salle Pleyel in Paris, Centre for Fine Arts in Brussels, the Saint Petersburg Philharmonia in Saint Petersburg, and the Alte Oper in Frankfurt.

== Compositions ==
Rachveli is the composer of several symphonic works performed internationally.

His Piano Concerto "Introversion" was performed at venues including Carnegie Hall and the Konzerthaus Berlin. Other orchestral works include The Answer and The Way Home and Back. His symphonic work Our Tale received its premiere in Ljubljana with the Slovenian Philharmonic Orchestra.

In 2024–2025 several of his works received international premieres, including Elektronzerto at the Beethovenfest, the harp concerto Pulse performed by Alexander Boldachev with the Luxembourg Chamber Orchestra in Zurich, and the symphony Our Tale in Ljubljana.

His vocal-instrumental composition The Rest is Silence, dedicated to Holocaust victims, was first performed at Teatro alla Scala. His ballet score The Silver Sun premiered at the Elbphilharmonie in Hamburg.

== City Lights ==
In 2020 the album City Lights was released by Deutsche Grammophon. The recording, featuring violinist Lisa Batiashvili and the Rundfunk-Sinfonieorchester Berlin, with Rachveli's arrangements based on themes by various composers and own compositions.

The project later developed into a concert programme performed internationally.

== Film and theatre music ==
Rachveli has composed music for film and theatre productions. He has written film scores for directors including Giorgi Shengelaia, Tina Menabde, Kakha Melitauri and Rezo Gigineishvili.

He has frequently collaborated with Georgian theatre director David Doiashvili. His theatre music includes scores for productions such as Macbeth and Life of an Idiot.

== Festivals and cultural initiatives ==
Rachveli is the founder of the contemporary music festival KONTRAPUNKT in Tbilisi. The festival presents works by Georgian and international composers including Karlheinz Stockhausen, John Cage, György Ligeti, Luciano Berio, Alfred Schnittke, Sofia Gubaidulina, Arvo Pärt, Valentin Silvestrov, Sulkhan Nasidze, Nodar Mamisashvili, Mikheil Shugliashvili, Natela Svanidze, Josef Bardanashvili, Frangiz Ali-Zadeh, Tigran Mansurian and others.

He has also been involved in promoting the works of Georgian composers internationally, including Giya Kancheli. Kancheli expressed appreciation for Rachveli's interpretations of his music. Rachveli has conducted performances of Kancheli's works with various orchestras and soloists, contributing to their presentation to international audiences.

== Support for Ukraine ==
Following the Russian invasion of Ukraine in 2022, Rachveli organised several solidarity concerts with the Georgian Philharmonic Orchestra. These included a live-streamed rehearsal in Tbilisi on 24 February 2022 featuring the Ukrainian national anthem.

He later conducted charity concerts and fundraising performances supporting Ukraine in Tbilisi and other European cities. He has also performed in Ukraine with ensembles including the National Philharmonic Orchestra of Ukraine, INSO-Lviv Symphony Orchestra and Kyiv Camerata.

== Honours ==
Rachveli has received several national and international awards. He is a recipient of the Shota Rustaveli State Prize, one of Georgia's highest cultural honours.

He has also served as a UNICEF Goodwill Ambassador in Georgia.
