= Temur Tsiklauri =

Temur Tsiklauri თემურ წიკლაური
- Born: 22 January 1946; Kojori, Georgian SSR, USSR
- Died: 2 January 2021 (aged 74) Gori, Georgia
- Occupations: Pop singer, actor
- Spouse: Lili Zghvauri

Temur Tsiklauri (Georgian: თემურ წიკლაური; 22 January 1946 – 1 February 2021) was a Georgian pop singer, actor, and a member of the ensemble VIA Iveria. Tsiklauri was awarded the title Honored Artist of the Georgian SSR in 1980, People's Artist of the Georgian SSR in 1990, and Honorary Citizen of Tbilisi in 2010.

== Biography ==
Temur Tsiklauri was born in 1946 in Kojori. He studied at the Kojori Secondary School and graduated from the Ilia Chavchavadze Pedagogical Institute of Foreign Languages in 1972. Starting in 1967, he was an actor in the Georgian Philharmony. From 1967 to 1972, he was a member of the ensemble "Tsitsinatela" and, from 1972, a soloist in the ensemble "Iveria." His repertoire included songs by Georgian composers, such as Nodar Gigauri's "My Tbilisi and Pirosmani", Giorgi Tsabadze's "Mananebo", Aleksandre Basilaia's "Georgia is for Sale", and Vaja Azarashvili’s "Dynamo." He also performed in Basilaia's musicals, including "The Eagle" (1980, "The Wedding of the Jays"), "King Aietes" (1983, "The Argonauts"), "Gervasi" (1986, "The Tale of the Snow Grandmother"), and "Niko Pirosmani" (1995, "Pirosmani").

Temur Tsiklauri appeared in several films, including "The Light in Our Windows" (1968), "Iveria, Love and…" (1974), "The Younger Sister" (1977), and "The Argonauts" (1985).

On 23 January 2014, a star in Temur Tsiklauri's name was unveiled in front of Tbilisi's Grand Concert Hall.

Tsiklauri died in Gori on 1 February 2021, ten days after his 75th birthday. He died from COVID-19.

In the beginning of 2022, a park located on 21 Adam Mitskevichi St, Tbilisi, was granted Temur Tsiklauris name.

On 4 October 2022, a biographical book about Temuri's life named "Voice Is The Flame Of The Soul" was published.

== Personal life ==
He was married to Lili Zghvauri and had two children – a son, Giorgi (died 1983), and a daughter, Ketevan Tsiklauri.
