= Island of Lost Ships =

- Written by: Arkadiy Klyonov; Yevgeny Ginzburg; Rauf Məmmədov
- Directed by: Evgeniy Ginzburg; Rauf Mamedov
- Starring: Gediminas Storpirshtis; Nikolai Lavrov; Larisa Belogurova; Arunas Storpirshtis
- Country of origin: Soviet Union
- Original language: Russian

Production
- Cinematography: Valeriy Mironov
- Running time: 138 min. (2 episodes)
- Production company: Lenfilm

Original release
- Release: 1987

Island of Lost Ships (Russian: Остров погибших кораблей, romanized: Ostrov pogibshikh korabley) is a 1987 Soviet two-part musical television miniseries directed by Yevgeny Ginzburg and Rauf Mamedov and based on the eponymous novel by Alexander Belyaev.

== Plot ==
The film begins as an ordinary modern man, resident of Leningrad named Volodya (Gediminas Storpirshtis), quarrels with his wife. Then he goes outside ... and unexpectedly finds himself in 1928 Marseille, in the body of one Reginald Gatling, a murderer (according to the inspector Jimmy Simpkins, who promptly arrests him).

Together they board a steamer which should take them to America, "closer to the electric chair". But at night the ship crashes and drowns for unknown reasons. Miraculously surviving Volodya, Jimmy, as well as charming passenger Vivian Kingman (Larissa Belogurova) - a carbon copy of Volodya's wife - board the Flying Dutchman which floated by the place of the disaster and continues to drift on the high seas. Finally then they get to an island formed from the wreckage of half-sunk ships, lost in the Sargasso Sea. The ruler of the island is Fergus Slayton (Arunas Storpirstis), his closest assistant is Sholom the Blabber (Konstantin Raikin). In addition to them, the island is inhabited by: Sholom's wife Maggie (Natalia Lapina), the historian Luders with his wife Frida (Lilian Malkina) and many more sailors, travelers, pirates. According to custom, newcomer Vivian should choose her husband from one of the island's inhabitants. Slayton, who himself became fond of her, locks Volodya and Jimmy in the cooler, but they manage to free themselves and catch the ceremony of choosing the groom. Vivian chooses Volodya to be her husband because she is in love with him. Islanders arrange a magnificent wedding. Then comes the wedding night and Volodya confesses to Vivian that he is already married and "came from another world." But now he does not care, he's in love with Vivian ... Meanwhile, Jimmy is watching Slayton. He notices the "tail" and is worried.

And the next morning, Jimmy accidentally wanders into the hold of some abandoned ship, where he discovers Slayton Edward's brother, locked in a cage. He's clearly not himself. At this time, Slayton approaches. He tells Jimmy about his brother, and also about his relationship with Maggie. This conversation is heard by Sholom. He is shocked by the fact that his wife cheated on him. Meanwhile, Slayton leads Jimmy out, but Volodya appears. He frees Edward, but he ends up running about the island in a frenzy and dies. Meanwhile, Slayton shares with Jimmy his plans for the island: he wants to fly in a balloon, and then go back for the treasure. After that, Slayton pushes Jimmy into the water and shoots him in front of the island's inhabitants. Sholom announces over the loudspeaker everything he heard in the conversation between Jimmy and Slayton, and immediately gets a bullet into his forehead. Then Slayton kills Vivian out of revenge and escapes. He is chased after but manages to fly away in a hot air balloon.

But Volodya suddenly finds himself again in his own age. Judging by his ragged appearance, unshaven face and a bump on the back of his head, everything that happened to him was not just a dream. In his own world, however, only a few minutes seem to have passed. It all ends with Volodya returning to his apartment and sharing a meal with his wife, who strongly resembles the deceased Vivian.

== Cast ==
- Larissa Belogurova - Vivian Kingman / Volodya's wife / Della Jackson
- Gediminas Storpirshtis - Volodya / Reginald Gatling
- Nikolai Lavrov - Special agent Jim Simpkins
- Konstantin Raikin - Sholom the Blabber
- Natalia Lapina - Maggie
- Arunas Storpirshtis - Governor Fergus Slayton (voiced by Andrei Tolubeyev)
- Lillian Malkina - Frida
- Gali Abaydulov
- Valentin Zhilyaev - Red
- Sergey Parshin - "The Sailor"
- Semyon Furman - "Asian"
- Arkady Shalolashvili - "The Turk"
- Mikhail Shtein - "Lilliput"
- Mikhail Scheglov - Lyuders, husband of Frida
- Tito Romalio - "Mulatto"
- Algis Arlauskas
- Larisa Dolina
- Yuri Senkevich - cameo

== Soundtrack ==
- "The Legendary Song" (music by Vladimir Davydenko, words by Yuri Ryashentsev) performed by Vladimir Stephin, Ella Fidelman, Nina Matveeva.
- "The path to the bottom" (music by Georgy Garanian, words by Yuri Ryashentsev) are performed by Lyubov Privil, Vladimir Stepan, Ella Fidelman, Nina Matveeva.
- "Shark" (music by Aleksandr Zatsepin, words by Yuri Ryashentsev) performed by Nikolai Noskov.
- "Oh, if not love ..." (music by Vladimir Davydenko, words by Yuri Ryashentsev) performed by Nikolai Noskov and Ella Fidelman.
- "Ghosts" (music by Georgy Garanian, words by Yuri Ryashentsev) performed by Vladimir Presnyakov Jr.
- "The Song of the Sholom Meeting Newcomers" (music by Aleksandre Basilaia, words by Yuri Ryashentsev) performed by Mikhail Pokhmanov.
- "The Song of Bermuda" (music by Yury Saulsky, words by Yuri Ryashentsev) performed by Vladimir Stoopin.
- "On the Island" (music David Tukhmanov, words by Yuri Ryashentsev) performed by Sergey Minaev.
- "Wedding Song" (music by David Tukhmanov, words by Yuri Ryashentsev) performed by Sergey Minaev.
- "Draw lots" (words by Yuri Ryashentsev) performed by Mikhail Pokhmanov.
- "The beginning of each of us" (music by Yury Saulsky, words by Yuri Ryashentsev) performed by Sergey Minaev.
- "Letters to the Beloved" (music by Aleksandre Basilaia, words by Yuri Ryashentsev) performed by the band Iveria.
- "My Faithful Moor" (Vladimir Davydenko, words by Yuri Ryashentsev) performed by Larisa Dolina.
- "Song of a legal marriage" (music by Aleksandre Basilaia, words by Yuri Ryashentsev) performed by Sergey Minaev.
- "Nothing to possess" (music by Aleksandr Zatsepin, words by Yuri Ryashentsev) performed by the ensemble Iveria.
- "Governor of Slighton number" (Vladimir Davydenko's music, words by Yuri Ryashentsev) performed by Pavel Smeyan.
- "The song of Sholom about his wife" (Vladimir Davydenko's music, words by Yuri Ryashentsev) performed by Mikhail Pokhmanov.
- "Romance" (music by Vladimir Davydenko, words by Yuri Ryashentsev) performed by Nikolai Noskov.
