= Simon Mikeladze =

Prince Simon Mikeladze (Georgian: სიმონ მიქელაძე) was born into a Georgian noble family known from at least the 14th century, and claiming descent from the Bagratids of Taron. The senior, and the princely, line of the Mikeladze flourished in Imereti (western Georgia).

== Background ==
The Mikeladze family was constantly involved in the civil wars that plagued Imereti (western Georgia) from the 15th century into the 19th. After the Russian conquest of Imereti in 1810, the family was integrated into the Russian nobility and confirmed as a princely house (knyaz) in 1850.

Many in the Mikeladze family made careers in Russia while others immigrated to other parts of the world after the Russian revolution. The family has produced several military officers, intellectuals, musicians and notables in other professions.

== Progeny ==
Prince Simone Mikeladze had six children:

- Konstantin Mikeladze (1895–1927)
- Grigor Mikeladze (1898–1955)
- Evgeni Mikeladze (1903–1937)
- Keto Mikeladze (1905–1956)
- Tamara Mikeladze
- Anastasia Mikeladze
