= Tamara Gverdtsiteli =

Georgian singer (born 1962)

Tamara Gverdtsiteli თამარ გვერდწითელი PAR
- Gverdtsiteli in 2026
- Born: Tamara Gverdtsiteli; 18 January 1962 (age 64); Tbilisi, Georgian SSR, Soviet Union
- Occupations: Singer; actress
- Years active: 1972–present
- Title: People's Artist of the Georgian SSR (1991) People's Artist of Russian Federation (2004) People's Artist of the Republic of Ingushetia (2006)
- Awards: Lenin Komsomol Prize (USSR); Order of Honour (1998, Georgia); Person of the Year (2002, Ukraine)

Tamara Gverdtsiteli (Georgian: თამარ გვერდწითელი, Russian: Тамара Михайловна Гвердцители; born 18 January 1962) is a Georgian, Soviet and Russian singer, pianist, composer and actress. She received several honorary titles including Honored Artist of the Georgian SSR (1989), People's Artist of the Georgian SSR (1991) and the Russian Federation (2004).

== Early life and education ==
Gverdtsiteli was born on 18 January 1962 in Tbilisi, Georgian Soviet Socialist Republic. Her father, Mikheil Gverdtsiteli (1936-2021), came from a Georgian aristocratic family, and her mother, Inna Kofman (1938-2022), came from a Jewish family (a granddaughter of a rabbi) from Odessa, Ukrainian Soviet Socialist Republic, that ended up in Tbilisi, Georgia in the 1940s as a result of World War II.

Gverdtsiteli graduated from the music school at the piano department of the Tbilisi State Conservatoire. In the early 1970s, she became a soloist of a children's music group called Mziuri, with which she toured the countries of Soviet Union. The singer sang in this formation for the next seven years.

== Career ==
=== International Music Competitions and Festivals ===
- V All-Union Contest of Young Performers of Soviet Songs ("Dnepropetrovsk-81"), Dnipropetrovsk, Ukraine, June 1981, 2nd place.
- VII International Youth Song Festival "Red Carnation", Sochi, Russia, September 1981, 1st place.
- XI Internationales Schlagerfestival, Dresden, Germany, 21-25 September 1982, 2nd place.
- Mărțișor All-Union (now International) Music Festival ("Mărțișor-84"), Chișinău, Moldova, 1 March 1984, invited guest performer
- XXI International Pop Song Festival "Golden Orpheus", Sunny Beach, Bulgaria, 8-11 June 1988, 1st place.
- Sopot International Song Festival ("Sopot-89"), Sopot, Poland, 16-19 August 1989, invited guest performer.
- XL Sanremo Music Festival (segment Sanremo Libertà / Sanremo Est, for the performance of artists from Eastern Europe), Sanremo, Italy, February-March 1990, invited guest performer.

=== Musical Theatre Performances ===
- Yuriy Rybchynskyi and Gennadiy Tatarchenko's rock-opera "White Crow", starred as John of Arc (Russian-language version, 1992, Ukraine).
- "Man of La Mancha", co-starred as Dulcinea del Toboso (Russian-language version, 2005-2015, Russia).
- Georges Bizet's "Carmen", starred as Carmen (in French, 2009-2012, Ukraine).
- Francis Poulenc's "La Voix humaine", starred as Elle (Russian-language version, 2018-2022, Russia).
- Andrew Lloyd Weber's "Sunset Boulevard", starred as Norma Desmond (Russian-language version, 2023, Armenia).
- Nunu Gabunia's "Kinto", starred as Salome (in Georgian, 2026, Georgia).

At the age of 19, Gverdtsiteli finished in second place at the All-Union Contest of Young Performers of Soviet Songs in Dnipropetrovsk in June 1981 and won the international competition "Red Carnation" in Sochi in September 1981. The songs "Blossom, my land" (T. Gverdtsiteli, G. Tabidze) and "Music" (V. Azarashvili, M. Potskhishvili) brought her to fame. In September 1982, she took part in a popular music competition in Dresden, the Internationales Schlagerfestival, and in June 1988 she won the Golden Orpheus song contest, then performed as a guest artist at the festivals in Sopot International Song Festival in August 1989 and Sanremo in 1990. Her 1985 debut solo album "Music" included songs in Georgian and Russian, and one song in Spanish - the famous "Granada" by Agustín Lara. Since 1987, Gverdtsiteli has acted as a jury member of music festivals.

In 1991, Gverdtsiteli was invited by her French agent to Paris, where she met Michel Legrand and Jean Dréjac. At the same time, a contract was signed with Legrand and her first concert took place at the Olympia. Legrand, introducing the three-thousandth hall, said: "Paris! Remember this name." In Gverdtsiteli's repertoire, songs of civil sound coexisted with elegiac, lyrical songs. Gradually, more and more songs of her own composition appeared. Of the major events of her creative life, her solo concerts include at Olympia (Paris, 1994), with the A. Kozlov Ensemble at Carnegie Hall (New York, 1995), Michel Legrand Presents Tamara Gverdtsiteli (New York, 1996). In 2010, she performed the part of Carmen on the stage of the Dnipropetrovsk Opera House with the Milanese baritone Giovanni Ribichesu. In 2014, Gverdtsiteli became a judge in The Voice of Ukraine, the Ukrainian version of The Voice. She was also a judge in The Voice Senior in 2020. In the spring of 2022, Gverdtsiteli temporarily stopped performing in Russia.

== Personal life ==
Gverdtsiteli has been married three times. Her first husband was Giorgi Kakhabrishvili, director and vice-chairman of the Georgian Public Broadcasting. The couple got married in 1984, and in 1986, their only son, Alexander, was born. In 1995, the couple divorced after eleven years of marriage. Gverdtsiteli's second husband was a lawyer named Dmitry Breslav, with whom she moved to Boston. A few months later, however, Breslav died of heart failure. Her third husband was cardiac surgeon Sergei Ambatelo. The couple divorced in December 2005. On 12 July 2000, Gverdtsiteli received Russian citizenship. Her father, Mikheil, died in November 2021, and her mother, Inna, died in October 2022.

== Discography ==
- 1982 — Цвети, Земля Моя (Bloom, My Land)
- 1985 — მუსიკა / Музыка (Music)
- 1987 — Со Мной Повсюду Только Ты (Only You Are With Me Everywhere)
- 1991 — Рок-опера «Белая Ворона» (Rock-opera "White Crow")
- 1992 — აღსარება / Исповедь (Confession)
- 1994 — Виват, Король! (Vivat, My Love!)
- 1996 — Spasibo, Muzyka, tebe!
- 2000 — Luchshiye pesni raznykh let
- 2001 — Posvyashcheniye Zhenshchine
- 2002 — Vivat, Lyubov', Vivat!
- 2002 — Mne vchera prisnilos' nebo
- 2003 — Izbrannoye
- 2004 — Muzyka — Khram Dushi
- 2008 — Vozdushnyy potseluy
- 2008 — MP3-al'bom Izbrannoye
- 2009 — The Best (2 CD)
- 2016 — Tamara Gverdtsiteli
- 2017 — Momele
