= Keto Mikeladze =

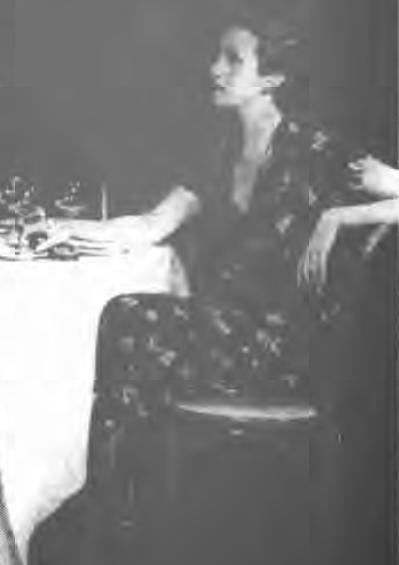
Princess Ketto Mikeladze at the Ritz hotel

Princess Ketevan "Ketto" Mikeladze (Georgian: ქეთევან "ქეთო" მიქელაძე; 1905–1965) was born in Tbilisi, Russian Empire into a Georgian noble family of Mikeladze, known from at least the 14th century, then part of Imperial Russia. Her family belonged to the aristocratic and sophisticated circles in Russia before the Russian Revolution in 1917.

Prince Simone Mikeladze, Keto's father had six children, three girls and three boys as follows:

- Konstantin Mikeladze: (1895–1927)
- Grigor Mikeladze: (1898–1955)
- Evgeni Mikeladze: (1903–1937)
- Keto Mikeladze
- Tamar Mikeladze
- Anastasia Mikeladze

Ketto Mikeladze married a Russian officer of Danish origin, Captain Lassen, who had happened to be in Iran during the war. He had miraculously escaped being massacred by his soldiers in Rezaieh at the time of the revolution.

She found her way to New York, via Paris, accompanied by her daughter Sigrid Lassen. Nicolai Fechin painted her portrait in 1927-28, which was featured in an April 1928 exhibition at the Stendahl Galleries. In 1931, Ketto became a model working in the Bergdorf Goodman fine fashion department. For a while, she was also a Ziegfeld girl, a dressmaker and a sales lady.

She also became a socially prominent New Yorker. After a few years, Ketto Mikeladze became the special designer for Elizabeth Arden’s lingerie department. Elizabeth Arden had a great fondness for White Russian noble families and was enchanted by Princess Keto Mikeladze. The special pieces Mikeladze designed sold at premium prices. The princess also became a close friend of Helena Rubenstein, who left her $1,200 in her will. She started her own business opening a gown and lingerie shop in New York named Ketto Inc.

Sigrid Lassen, her daughter, studied music. Sigrid Lassen was a socialite and a singer who sang at Armando’s for a while. She made her light opera debut in the title of “Pink Lady” at the 7th season of light and comic operas. She also starred in the ‘who’s who on the alkaline side”, a “White Rock advertisement” in 1940.
