= Virsaladze =

The Virsaladze (Georgian: ვირსალაძე) is a Georgian family name from the Imereti region in western Georgia.

The Virsaladze family name comes from these towns of Imereti: Terjola, Koka and Simoneti. Presently, there are 173 Virsaladze family names in Georgia.

== Notable members ==
- Anastasia Virsaladze (1883-1968), pianist
- Elene Virsaladze (1911-1977), folklorist
- Eliso Virsaladze (b. 1942), pianist
- Simon Virsaladze (1909-1989), designer of ballet, film and opera
- Tinatin Virsaladze (1907-1985), art historian
