= Tamara Shaverzashvili =

Georgian composer

Tamara Antonovna Shaverzashvili (Georgian: თამარ შავერზაშვილი; 14 October 1891 – 18 September 1955) was a Georgian composer, pianist, and teacher who composed many children's songs and received an title Honored Worker in Art of the Georgian SSR. She published her music under the name Tamara Shaverzashvili.

Shaverzashvili was born in Kutaisi. She graduated from the Tbilisi Music School, where she studied piano and composition with Vladimir Shcherbachov and Iona Tuskia. Later, she studied with Pyotr Ryazanov.

Shaverzashvili taught piano privately, and from 1935 to 1938, lived in Tbilisi and taught at the Z. Paliashvili Central Music School. In 1938, she began teaching at the Tbilisi Conservatory and during her tenure there was awarded the Honored Worker in Art award in 1946. Baritone David Gamrekeli and pianist T. Dunenko recorded at least one of her songs commercially in 1938.

Shaverzashvili's compositions included:

== Chamber ==
- String Quartet
- Suite (cello and piano; 1949)
- Suite (for winds; 1938)

== Orchestra ==
- Suite (1935)
- Twelve Pieces from Children's Suite
- Two Marches

== Piano ==
- Children’s Album (40 pieces; 1946)
- Nocturne
- Pastorale
- Polyphonic Suite
- Spinning Wheel
- Twenty Children’s Pieces (1952)

== Theater ==
- Spring
- Spring and Summer

== Vocal ==
- Fifty Songs for School Children (1923-1929)
- “My Sadness” (text by Alexander Chavchavadze)
- “Pesni Gor”
- “Regret” (text by Ioseb Grishashvili)
- Twelve Children’s Songs (1925)
- Two Lullabies
