= Vakhtang Machavariani =

Georgian composer and conductor (1951–2025)

- ვახტანგ მაჭავარიანი
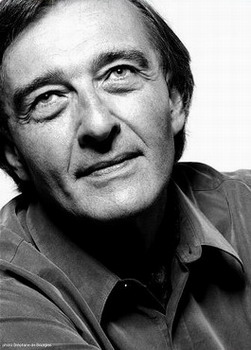
- Machavariani in the 1990s
- Born: 19 February 1951; Tbilisi, Georgian SSR
- Died: 6 May 2025 (aged 74); Tbilisi, Georgia
- Education: Tbilisi State Conservatoire
- Occupations: Conductor; composer
- Organizations: Georgian Philharmonic Orchestra
- Parent: Aleksi Machavariani
- Awards: Presidential Order of Excellence

Vakhtang Machavariani (Note: Also spelled Matchavariani; Georgian: ვახტანგ მაჭავარიანი; Russian: Вахтанг Мачавариани.) (19 February 1951 – 6 May 2025) was a Georgian, Soviet and Russian conductor and composer. The chief conductor of the Georgian Philharmonic Orchestra from 1996, he worked with about 80 orchestras, among them prominent symphony orchestras of the world. His compositions include a symphony in memory of his father, Aleksi Machavariani, vocal works based on Shakespeare and Merab Kostava, and a symphonic poem Mariupol.

== Life and career ==
Machavariani was born in Tbilisi on 19 February 1951, the son of composer Aleksi Machavariani and a grandson of the choral conductor Kirile Pachkoria. He studied piano at the Tbilisi State Conservatoire with Emil Gurevich, graduating in 1973. He studied conducting there with Odisey Dimitiriadi, graduating in 1977. From 1991 he took a course with Gennady Rozhdestvensky at the Moscow Conservatory, and further at the Vienna Music Academy with Karl Österreicher.

=== Conductor ===
In 1983 Machavariani conducted the world premiere of his father's Third and Fourth Symphonies in Tbilisi with the Georgian State Symphony Orchestra.,

From 1984 to 1990, Machavariani conducted productions Kirov Theatre in Leningrad. He conducted the premiere of his father's ballet The Knight in the Tiger's Skin there in 1985.

He was chief conductor of the Tbilisi State Academic Theater of Opera and Ballet from 1987 to 1990 and artistic director of the Chamber Orchestra of the Georgian Music Society from 1987 to 1991. In 1990, Machavariani created the Soviet Festival Orchestra (later the Moscow Festival Orchestra), which toured Europe and Asia. He was an assistant to Lorin Maazel at the Vienna State Opera.

Machavariani was chief conductor of the Georgian Philharmonic Orchestra in Tbilisi from 1996. He conducted the world premiere of his father's Fifth and Sixths Symphonies with them in 1989. He also conducted the world premiere of his father's 1990 Cello Concerto with the orchestra and soloist T. Gabarashvili. He conducted the orchestra in 2008 in a memorial concert for his father presenting his music, a suite from his ballet Otello, three romances for mezzo-soprano and orchestra to texts by Georgian authors, and the premiere of a symphonic suite, The Taming of the Shrew. In 2010 he conducted the world premiere of his father's opera Medea in a concert performance. He conducted the Georgian Philharmonic in a concert of the Toradze Festival at the Tbilisi opera house in 2023, including Mozart's Piano Concerto No. 27 with soloist Vladimir Feltsman, Rachmaninoff's Isle of the Dead and Stravinsky's Firebird Suite.

Machavariani became artistic director of Bravo, an opera festival founded by Paata Burchuladze, in 1998, and was music director of Millenium, a large symphony orchestra of the Russian Federation from 2000 to 2008. He was a conductor of the Russian Bolshoi Symphony Orchestra from 2003 and performed regularly with the Presidential Symphony Orchestra of Turkey from 2011.

Machavariani was a principal guest conductor of the Georgian National Opera. In 2011 he conducted the world premiere of his father's ballet Pirosmani (Pictures of Old Tbilisi) in a concert performance at the opera house. Machavariani collaborated with 80 symphony orchestras including the Saint Petersburg Philharmonic Orchestra, the Moscow Philharmonic Orchestra, the State Academic Symphony Orchestra of the Russian Federation, the USSR Ministry of Culture Symphony Orchestra, the Royal Philharmonic Orchestra, German and French radio orchestras, and the Israel Symphony Orchestra. He directed the Night Serenades festival, founded by Liana Isakadze, from 2018.

=== Composer ===
Machavariani composed his First Symphony "Harmonia Mundi", dedicated to the memory of his father, and premiered it with the orchestra of the National Opera at the Tbilisi State Conservatoire in 2014. He set ten of Shakespeare's sonnets for mezzo-soprano and orchestra. He wrote the libretto for his father's opera Medea and collaborated with him for the finale of its first act. He composed a tribute for Beethoven's anniversary in 2020, Dedication to Ludwig van B for strings, piano and timpani. The same year he wrote Impressions 2020 for viola, mezzo-soprano, piano, celesta, harp and 7 percussionists, expressing the feelings during the COVID-19 pandemic. He composed a song, "Wait, O my soul" on a poem by Merab Kostava.

In 2022, Machavariani composed a symphonic poem entitled "Mariupol," named after the Ukrainian city Mariupol, dedicating it to its defenders and heroes in the Siege of Mariupol, as part of the Georgian Philharmonic Orchestra's solidarity rally in support of Ukraine.

=== Personal life and death ===
Machavariani and his wife, Alexandra, had a son, Aleksi.

Machavariani died on 6 May 2025, at the age of 74, as announced on Facebook by Georgian soprano Tamar Iveri.

== Awards ==
Machavariani was awarded the Presidential Order of Excellence in 2011.

== Discography ==
Alexi Matchavariani, violin concerto. Soloist – Liana Isakadze. Big Symphony Orchestra of the Radio & TV of USSR. Conductor: Vakhtang Matchavariani. № C-10 10945-6

Alexi Matchavariani, Symphony N:1. Symphony Orchestra of Leningrad Philharmonic. Conductor: Vakhtang Matchavariani. № C-10 2567 004

Alexi Matchavariani. Symphony N:3. Kirov (Mariisky) theater orchestra, Leningrad. Conductor: Vakhtang Matchavariani. № C-10-27809 000

Alexi Matchavariani. Symphony N:5 “Ushba”. Kirov (Mariisky) theater orchestra, Leningrad. Conductor: Vakhtang Matchavariani. № C-10 30231-000

Alexi Matchavariani. Symphony N:6 "Amirani". Georgian State Symphony Orchestra. Conductor: Vakhtang Matchavariani.

Alexi Matchavariani. Ballet "Othello" (3 records). Kirov (Mariisky) theater orchestra, Leningrad. Conductor: Vakhtang Matchavariani. № C-10 24147 004.

Alexi Matchavariani. Ballet"The Knight In The Tiger Skin" (4 record). Symphony Orchestra of the ministry of culture of USSR. Conductor: Vakhtang Matchavariani. № C-10 20403 003

Jazz meets Classic. Kirov (Mariisky) theater orchestra. Conductor: Vakhtang Matchavariani.

=== As conductor ===
Machavariani conducted recordings of several of his fathers works, including his ballet The Man in the Panther's Skin in 1983 with the Cinema Orchestra of the SSSR, his ballet Otello in 1986, his First Symphony in 1987, his Third Symphony in 1988 and his Fifth Symphony Symphony in 1990, all of these with the Orchestra of the Kirov Theatre.
