= Sergey Mayzel =

Sergey Osipovich Mayzel
- Born: Sergey Osipovich Mayzel; Сергей Осипович Майзель; 26 December 1907 [O.S. 14 December] Saint-Petersburg
- Died: 5 July 1955 (aged 47); Moscow
- Occupation: physicist

Sergey Osipovich Mayzel (Russian: Сергей Осипович Майзель, 26 December 1907 [O.S. 14 December], Saint-Petersburg ― 5 July 1955, Moscow) was a Soviet physicist and a specialist in the field of lighting engineering. He was Honored Worker of Science and Technology of the RSFSR (1944) and laureate of Stalin Prize of II degree (1946).

== Biography ==
Sergei Osipovich Mayzel was born on 14 December 1907 [O.S. 26 December] in St. Petersburg in the family of doctor Osip (Joseph) Isayevich Mayzel (1855–1913), a graduate of Imperial Medico-Surgical Academy of 1881. Sergey's mother, Sofya Efremovna Antik, died on December 25, 1882, 10 days after his birth, due to childbirth complications.

Mayzel was a Hereditary honorary citizen. In 1906 he graduated from St. Petersburg University and trained at the University of Göttingen in 1909. In 1906–1930 he worked as a mining engineer at the St. Petersburg Mining Institute. In 1908–1918 he simultaneously taught at Higher Women's Courses. Professor since 1911, he had the rank of Court councillor.

Since 1920, he worked part-time at the State Optical Institute. In 1930–1952 he worked in Moscow in the All-Union Electrotechnical Institute (since 1951 it was called Research Institute of Light Engineering, VNISI). In 1932 he began working at Moscow Power Engineering Institute (MPEI) and directed its Lighting Engineering Department. He was Doctor of Technical Sciences (1938) and a member of the CPSU(b) since 1947.

Sergei Mayzel died on July 5, 1955, in Moscow.

=== Family ===
Sergey Osipovich Mayzel had two sons:

- Boris Mayzel (1907―1987), a composer.
- Evgeni Mayzel (1912―1944, died in World War II). He was a specialist in aerial photography, in 1935―1939 he was married to a methodologist in rhythmic gymnastics and dancer Mariana Janovna Shpilrein (Rodionova in her second marriage), the daughter of a mathematician and electromechanic Jan Shpilrein.

=== Scientific work ===
His main works are devoted to the physical basics of construction of light quantities, the basics of colorimetry, the problems of blackout, the methods of light measurements, the normalization of lighting for various types of work, and the development of new sources of light. He developed the theory of color vision. He participated in solving the issues of light coverage of the Hermitage, State Tretyakov Gallery, several Moscow Metro stations, Kremlin stars, Lenin Mausoleum, and various other objects. He presented critics of the definition of the luminous flux as the power of emanation estimated by visual sensation; the physical definition he proposed was internationally recognized. The new "equivalent brightness" value proposed by him for the estimation of small brightness photometry was included in the system of basic photometric magnitudes (1963), and then in the International Lighting Technical Dictionary. He wrote articles for magazines "Electricity", "Lighting Engineering" (and was a member of the editorial board). Overall Mayzel played a leading role in the creation of the Soviet lighting engineering school.

== Literature ==
- С. О. Майзель. [Некролог], "Светотехника", 1955, No. 4.
- Об основных работах проф. С. О. Майзеля в области светотехники, "Светотехника", 1960, No. 7.
- Увековечить память о С. О. Майзеле, "Светотехника", 1961, No. 6.
- 60 лет развития светотехники в Ленинграде, "Светотехника", 1982, No. 12.
- С. О. Майзель. [К 100-летию со дня рождения], "Светотехника", 1983, No. 1.
