= Aleksandre Basilaia =

Georgian musician (1942–2009)

- ალექსანდრე ბასილაია
- Born: 11 March 1942; Tbilisi, Georgian SSR, Soviet Union
- Died: 3 October 2009 (aged 67); Germany
- Occupations: Composer; Songwriter

Aleksandre Aleksandres dze Basilaia (Note: Georgian: ალექსანდრე „ბუთხუზი“ ალექსანდრეს ძე ბასილაია, romanized: Aleksandre “Butkhuzi” Aleksandres dze Basilaia; Russian: Александр Александрович Басилая, romanized: Aleksandr Aleksandrovich Basilaya) (11 March 1942 – 3 October 2009) was a Georgian composer and songwriter of popular music and film scores. He led the popular musical group Iveria since its founding in 1968 through the mainstream success in the 1970s and 1980s until his death of a long and severe disease in Germany in 2009. He held the titles of Honored Artist of Georgia and Honored Citizen of Tbilisi.

Basilaia was trained as a contrabassist at the Tbilisi State Conservatoire and became active at the Soviet Georgian scene in 1963. In 1968 he founded an ensemble (VIA) which was named Iveria after an ancient Georgian kingdom. Basilaia was a principal composer and an art manager for Iveria which quickly gained popularity for its fusion of pop, rock and jazz with traditional Georgian music and attained to Soviet-wide fame with its musicals The Wedding of Jays (1980) and The Argonauts (1982). Basilaia’s third and the last musical Pirosmani was successfully staged in both Georgia and Russia in 1996. Basilaia's last work "Something Has Ended" appeared shortly before the composer’s death in October 2009. He was buried at the Didube Pantheon in Tbilisi.
