= Ivan Dzerzhinsky =

Russian composer (1909–1978)

Ivan Ivanovich Dzerzhinsky (Russian: Иван Иванович Дзержинский; 9 April 1909 – 18 January 1978) was a Soviet composer. The work for which he is best known, his opera Quiet Flows the Don, was more successful for its political potential than for any musical distinction.

== Early life ==
Born in Tambov, Dzerzhinsky had an extended formal background in music. He studied piano with Boleslav Yavorsky at the First Music Tekhnikum in Moscow between 1925 and 1929. Afterwards he spent 1930–31 at the Gnesin School as a composition student of Mikhail Gnessin. Two years at the Leningrad Central Music Tekhnikum followed. There he studied composition first with Gavriil Popov, then with Pyotr Ryazanov. He then proceeded to the Leningrad Conservatory for two years of study with Boris Asafyev.

== Musical career ==
From 1936 Dzerzhinsky held important administrative positions in the Union of Soviet Composers as well as in CPSU party politics. In 1948 he was appointed to the Central Committee. At various times after 1946, he acted as a deputy to the Leningrad City Soviet.

== Quiet Flows the Don ==
Dzerzhinsky consulted Shostakovich while composing the opera Quiet Flows the Don to a libretto adapted by Dzerzhinsky's brother, Leonid, from the Mikhail Sholokhov novel And Quiet Flows the Don. According to Leonid's own account, he utilized Shostakovich work motifs, freely rearranging and adapting to the purpose of accentuating the dramatic aspects of the plot and to condense as much as possible of the novel's social significance within the confines of the operatic format.

This opera was premiered at the Leningrad Maly Opera Theater in October 1935. Joseph Stalin saw the work on January 17, 1936 and immediately recognized its propaganda value. Its subject was heroic and patriotic; it glorified the spirit of the Don Cossacks, whose support would become necessary in the event of war (a war that, incidentally, seemed increasingly inevitable); and its music was both lyrical and immediately appealing. Sholokhov's novel, whose first edition was the basis of the opera, was later hailed: "...with its substance, construction, style and symbolism [it] is one of the most notable contemporary literary works of the Soviet Union. The author's selected setting is the Don Cossacks, their life and ways, class struggle, schisms and seesaws, that define and evoke the patriarchal order of Cossack life, the first imperialist war, the revolution and people's struggle. The great events of history are made manifest in the quietude and tranquility of Cossack life suffering a total upheaval, degenerating into in a bloody struggle."

Within weeks Quiet Flows the Don was proclaimed a model of socialist realism in music. Stalin saw Shostakovich's opera Lady Macbeth of Mtsensk at the same theater nine days after attending Quiet Flows the Don. His disapproval of Shostakovich's opera set the stage for its composer's official denunciation, which lasted until Shostakovich wrote his Fifth Symphony.

Due at least in part to official praise, Quiet Flows the Don proved wildly successful, reaching its 200th performance in May 1938. However, its conservative musical style, lyrical and folkloric, had limited developmental potential. Dzerzhinsky wrote his next opera, Virgin Soil Upturned (Podnyataya tselina), in 1937. Also based on a Sholokhov novel, it and subsequent successors did not repeat the success of Quiet Flows the Don.

== Style ==
Unlike Popov, Ryazanov and Asafyev, who were considered progressive in their musical outlook, Dzerzhinsky from the outset wrote works that were considered traditional. His First Piano Concerto, early songs and piano pieces were influenced by Grieg, Rachmaninoff and early Ravel. In the early 1930s he was influenced by Shostakovich's music, particularly in his Second Piano Concerto, which he wrote in 1934. (This piece was criticized officially much later.)

== Death ==
Dzerzhinsky died in Leningrad in 1978.

== Honours and awards ==
- Stalin Prize, 3rd class (1950) – for the song cycle, "New Village"
- Order of Lenin (1939)
- Order of the Red Banner of Labour
- People's Artist of the RSFSR (1977)
- Honoured Worker of the Arts Industry of the RSFSR (1957)
