= Grigor Mikeladze =

Prince (knyaz) Grigor Mikeladze
- Born: 1898; Tbilisi, Georgia
- Died: 1955 (aged 56–57); Tehran, Iran
- Resting place: Doulab Cemetery
- Occupation: Aristocrat

Prince (knyaz) Grigor Mikeladze (1898–1955) was born in Tbilisi, Georgia into a Georgian noble family, who are known from at least the 14th century, which was then a part of Imperial Russia. Grigori Mikeladze’s family belonged to the aristocratic and sophisticated circles of Russia before the Russian Revolution of 1917.

Grigor’s father Prince (knyaz) Simone Mikeladze, had six children, three girls and three boys: • Konstantin Mikeladze (1895–1927) • Grigor Mikeladze (1898–1955) • Evgeni Mikeladze (1903–1937) • Ketto Mikeladze • Tamara Mikeladze • Anastasia Mikeladze

== Early life ==
Grigor Mikeladze attended the Imperial Russian Cavalry School in Tbilisi and joined the army. Prince Grigor Semenovich Mikeladze emigrated from Russia to Iran after his brother Konstantin (Kostia) Semenovich Mikeladze was killed while serving in the Iranian Army, fighting Simko and his Kurdish fighters. He was accepted in the Iranian Army with his Russian rank, First Lieutenant.

Grigor Mikeladze was sent to Tabriz to fight the Simko Kurds who were fighting the Central Government in Azarbaijan from 1918–1922.

== Promotions ==
In 1930, by order of Reza Shah Pahlavi and the request of Hasan Arfa, who was appointed “Commander of the Pahlavi Guards Cavalry Regiment”, Prince Grigori Mikeladze was transferred from Tabriz to Tehran and served at the Pahlavi Guards Cavalry Regiment for a number of years. A few years later, Colonel Grigor Mikeladze was appointed commander of the “Hamleh Regiment at Mehrabad”.

Grigor Mikeladze served for years in the Iranian Army and rose through the ranks. Eventually, he was promoted to the rank of colonel, the highest rank a Christian foreigner could achieve in the Iranian Army.

== Later life ==
In 1941 and following the Anglo-Soviet invasion of Iran, the country was occupied by the British and the Soviets in the south and north respectively. Therefore to ensure his safety, Colonel Mikeladze was transferred to Isfahan by the request of Hasan Arfa and the order of Reza Shah. The reason for his transfer was that the Russians occupying the north could arrest Colonel Mikeladze and execute him on the pretext of being a deserter from the Russian army two decades ago.

In 1951, when Hossein Ala' became Prime Minister, he proposed the position of Minister of Roads and Communications to General Hasan Arfa. General Arfa in turn asked Colonel Mikeladze to join him in this endeavor. During his later years in life, Grigor Mikeladze retired from the Army and joined the private sector.

=== Life outside of duty ===
Prince Grigor married a Georgian belle by the name of Yelena (Lola) KhanPira (1900–1932). He had four daughters, Irina Mikeladze, Pariani (1925–1987), Moora Mikeladze, Parsa (1927–2008), Eya Mikeladze, Toossi (1929–) and Etery Mikeladze, Shartooni (1920–1957).

== Grigor's death ==
Grigor Mikeladze died of a heart attack in 1955. For all his services to the country the Iranian Army provided Colonel Mikeladze a full military ceremony with horse-drawn carriages and cannons. He was buried with full military honor. Both Grigor and Yelena Mikeladze (Khan Pira) are buried in Doulab Cemetery, the Christian cemetery which is in a beautiful garden shaded by big trees in the south of Tehran.
