= Jong Hwa Park =

South Korean pianist (born 1974)

- Hangul: 박종화
- RR: Bak Jonghwa
- MR: Pak Chonghwa

Jong Hwa Park (Korean: 박종화; born September 22, 1974) is a South Korean pianist. He was prized at the 1995 Queen Elisabeth Competition (5th) and the 1996 Concorso Busoni (4th) before being awarded the 1998 Paloma O'Shea Santander International Piano Competition's 2nd prize.

== Early life and education ==
Park was born on September 22, 1974. When he was a boy, Park attended Preparatory School of Tokyo Music College in Japan and then moved to the United States to attend Preparatory School of New England Conservatory. He became a full scholar of the New England Conservatory in 1992 and spend studying piano under guidance from Russell Sherman. At age 12, Park already became a recipient of the first prize at the Mainichi Shinbun Music Competition of Japan.

After completion of the studies and obtaining of both Bachelor and Master degrees with Honors, Park continued his studies abroad, first with Dmitri Bashkirov at Reina Sofía School of Music where he got his artist diploma, it was then followed by Joaquín Soriano in Spain, and lastly with Elisso Wirssaladze in Georgia. After his Park also received guidance from such pianists and conductors as Karl Ulrich Schnabel, Leon Fleisher and Martha Argerich. In 2003, Park moved to Germany, where he enrolled into a master class program at the University of Music and Performing Arts Munich.

== Career ==
Park is a winner of numerous piano competitions, including the Queen Elizabeth International, the Santander International, the Rubinstein International, and the Ferruccio Busoni International Piano Competitions. Among others, he has performed at the National Auditorium of Music in Madrid, Concertgebouw in Amsterdam, Herkules-Saal and the Centre for Fine Arts, Brussels. The orchestras that he played with include the Saint Petersburg Philharmonic, the Boston Symphony and the Dresden Symphony Orchestras, as well as performances with Daniel Hope and the Zurich Chamber Orchestra.

After long tours and numerous competitions, Park became a professor at Seoul National University in 2007.
