= Eliso Virsaladze =

Georgian pianist

Eliso Virsaladze ელისო ვირსალაძე
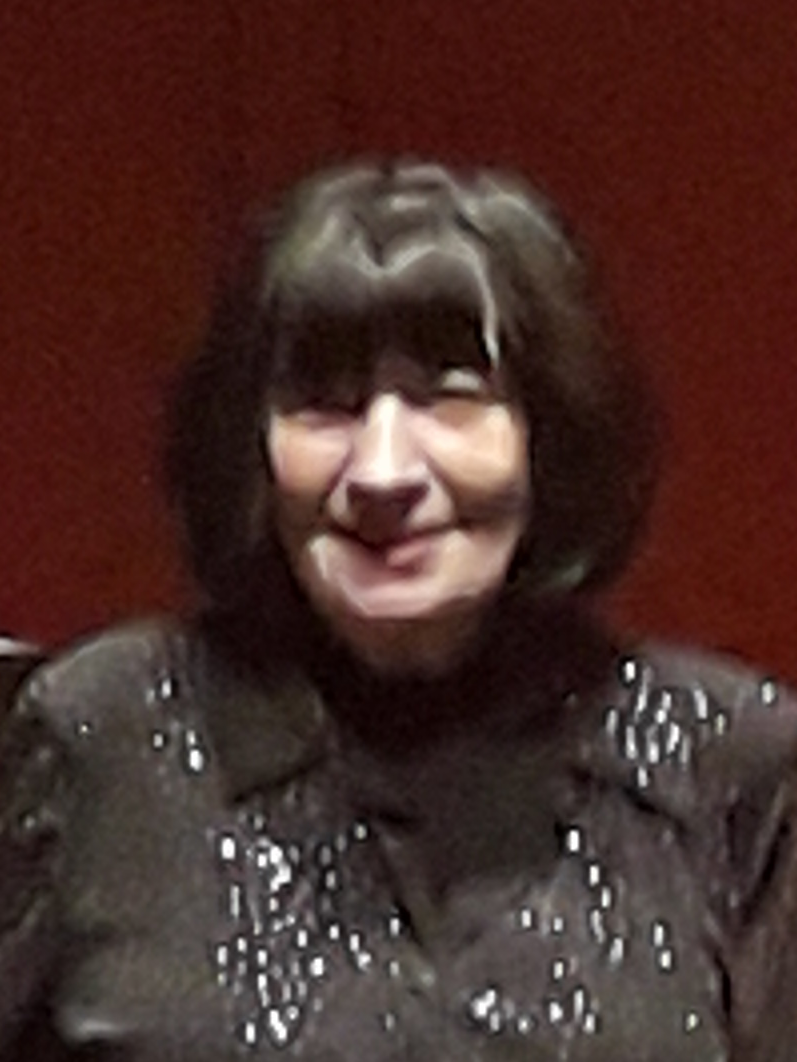
- Virsaladze in 2017

Background information
- Born: 14 September 1942 (age 84); Tbilisi, Georgian SSR
- Instrument: Piano
- Website: https://elisovirsaladze.com

Eliso Virsaladze (Georgian: ელისო ვირსალაძე; born 14 September 1942) is a Georgian pianist.

== Biography ==
Virsaladze was born in Tbilisi, Georgian SSR. Her father Constantine Virsaladze was a doctor and scientist, so was her grandfather Spiridon Virsaladze. She received her first piano lessons at the age of 9 from her grandmother, Anastasia Virsaladze, a well-known pianist and professor in Georgia. From the age of 9, she also started receiving lessons from Heinrich Neuhaus up until his last days. She graduated from the Tbilisi State Conservatory (Class of Anastasia Virsaladze), and continued her education as a postgraduate student at the Moscow Conservatory with Yakov Zak. She has also played for Aleksandr Goldenweiser and N. Perelman.

She won the 3rd prize in the International Tchaikovsky Competition in Moscow in 1962 and the 1st prize in the Robert Schumann International Competition in Zwickau, Germany in 1966.

Sviatoslav Richter described her as the best female pianist of her time and a leading interpreter of Schumann.

Virsaladze has been teaching at Moscow Conservatory since 1967 (becoming a professor in 1993) and taught at the University of Music and Performing Arts of Munich from 1995 to 2011. From 2010 she has been teaching at Scuola di Musica di Fiesole in Florence, Italy. She is also a visiting professor at the Tokyo College of Music.

Among her most students are B. Berezovsky, A. Volodin, A. Zuev, J.H.Park, T. Yang, D. Shishkin.

Since 1975, she has served on the jury of many international competitions, including the Queen Elisabeth Competition, Arthur Rubinstein International Piano Competition, R. Schumann International Competition, Géza Anda International Piano Competition, International Tchaikovsky Competition, Paloma O'Shea Santander International Piano Competition, and Tbilisi International Piano Competition.

Eliso Virsaladze speaks Georgian, English, German, French, Italian, Spanish, Russian and Polish.

== Orchestras and chamber music ==
Since 1966, Eliso Virsaladze has given recitals and appeared with international orchestras under Yevgeny Svetlanov, Kyrill Kondrashin, Yuri Temirkanov, Kurt Masur, Riccardo Muti, Kurt Sanderling, Mariss Jansons, Wolfgang Sawallisch, Marin Alsop, Charles Dutoit, Mikhail Pletnev, Vakhtang and Jansug Kakhidze and many others.

Virsaladze performs chamber music with partners including Natalia Gutman, Oleg Kagan, and the Borodin and Taneyev Quartets. Her repertoire includes works by Schumann, Beethoven, Bach, Mozart, and Chopin, much of which has been recorded by Live Classics.

She was awarded the title of People's Artist of the Georgian SSR in 1972, and of People's Artist of the USSR in 1989.

== See also ==
- Virsaladze, Georgian family name.
