= Giuli Chokheli =

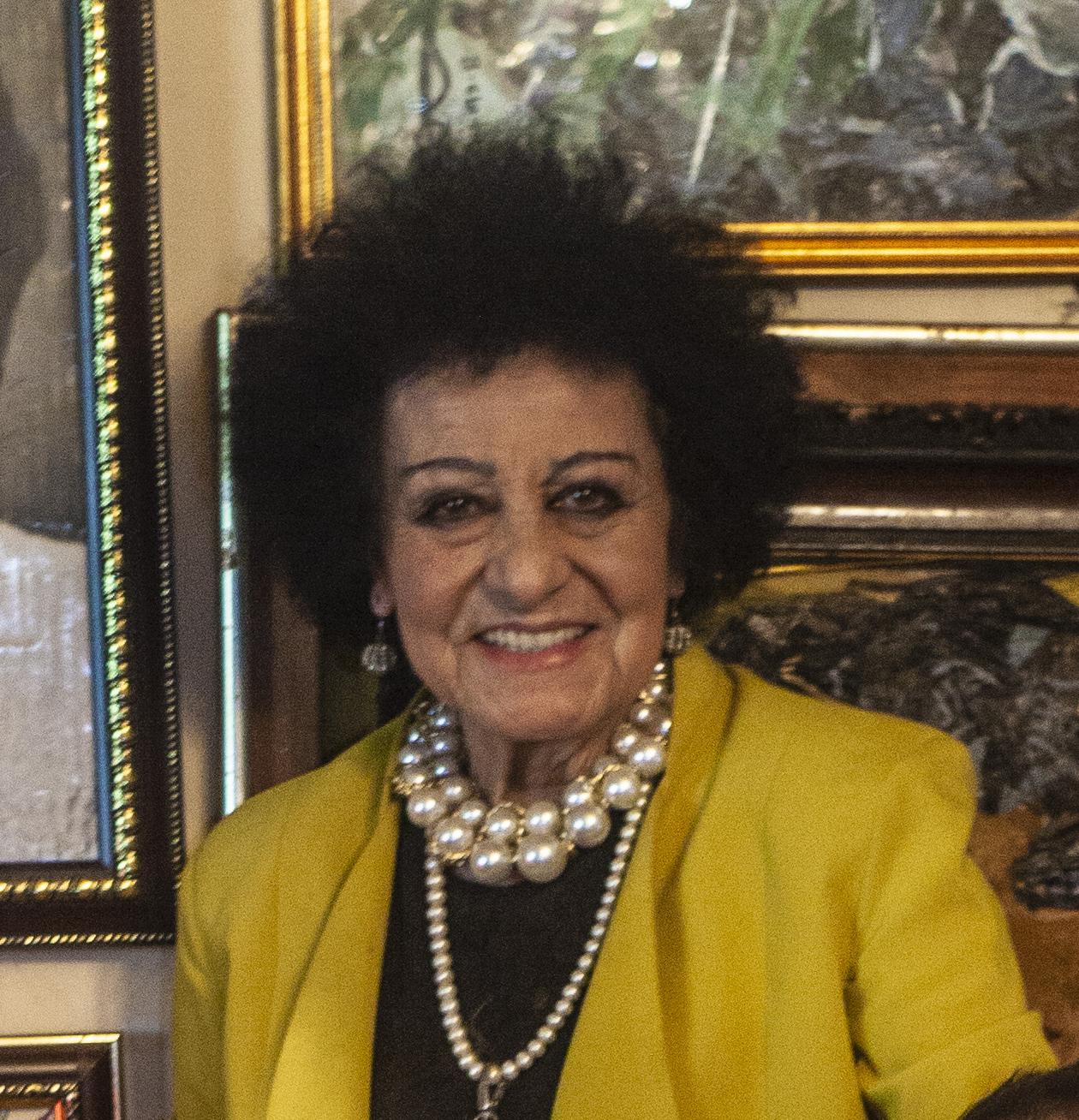
- Chokheli in 2018

Background information
- Born: Giuli Chokheli; 12 February 1935 (age 91); Tbilisi
- Genres: Pop, jazz, Soviet music
- Occupation: Singer
- Instruments: Vocals

Giuli Chokheli (Russian: Гюлли Николаевна Чохели, Georgian: გიული ჩოხელი; 12 February 1935, Tbilisi, Georgian SSR) is a Georgian singer of primarily pop and jazz. A groundbreaking artist, she began singing jazz when the genre was still a new phenomenon in the USSR. She was recognized as the Meritorious Artist of the Georgian SSR in 1967.

== Biography ==
Born 12 February 1935 in Tbilisi. Her mother, Yelena Chokheli, was herself a Georgian People's Artist.

She began to sing in her school years, studying in the music school at the Tbilisi State Conservatoire. Since 1953, the singer on the professional stage in the vocal trio of the Philharmonic.

In the late 1950s, she worked in the orchestras of Oleg Lundstrem, Konstantin Orbelyan, Yuri Saulsky. Songs of the peoples of the world formed the basis of her repertoire. At the onset of her music career, Chokheli's mother was concerned for her safety, even fearing an arrest, because jazz was perceived to be the cultural influence of the United States, seen by the Soviet authorities as the enemy of the USSR. Chokheli recounted with pride how the contemporaneous Voice Of America reports took note of her performances, commenting that she sang jazz with a Georgian flair.

Since 1961, Chokheli held solo concerts and performed with Eddie Rosner. She was one of the leading Soviet jazz singers of her time.

Chokheli won the first prize at the Sopot International Song Festival in 1967.

=== Discography ===
- Es Iko Sizmari ("This was a dream")
- Songs of Giuli Chokheli
