= Elena Bashkirova =

Russian-Israeli classical pianist and director

Elena Dmitrievna Bashkirova
- Елена Дмитриевна Башкирова
- Born: 1958 (age 67–68); Moscow, Soviet Union
- Education: Tchaikovsky Conservatory
- Occupations: Pianist, musical director
- Father: Dmitri Bashkirov

Elena Dmitrievna Bashkirova (Russian: Елена Дмитриевна Башкирова; born 1958) is a Russian-born Israeli classical pianist, chamber musician and musical director. She is the founder and artistic director of the Jerusalem International Chamber Music Festival and, since 2020, president of the Felix-Mendelssohn-Bartholdy-Stiftung in Leipzig.

== Early life and education ==
Bashkirova was born in Moscow into a musical family. Her father was the pianist and pedagogue Dmitri Bashkirov. She began formal study at the age of 15 in her father's class at the Tchaikovsky Conservatory. Together with violinist Gidon Kremer, with whom she had appeared as a duo partner, she left the Soviet Union in 1978 and settled in Paris.

== Career ==
Bashkirova's activities include appearances as a soloist, chamber musician, accompanist of singers and artistic programmer. Her official biography describes chamber music as a central part of her artistic work and notes that she has appeared as a soloist with orchestras including the Munich Philharmonic, the Vienna Symphony, the Orchestre de Paris and the Chicago Symphony Orchestra.

As a chamber musician, Bashkirova has performed with artists associated with the Jerusalem International Chamber Music Festival and with the Berlin festival Intonations. Her repertoire includes solo piano literature, chamber music and song accompaniment. Singers with whom she has appeared in duo programmes include Anna Netrebko, Olga Peretyatko, Dorothea Röschmann, René Pape and Robert Holl.

She has also collaborated with or been artistically associated with a number of conductors. Biographical sources identify Pierre Boulez, Sergiu Celibidache, Christoph von Dohnányi and Michael Gielen as important artistic influences, and refer to long-standing collaborations with Lawrence Foster, Karl-Heinz Steffens, Ivor Bolton, Manfred Honeck and Antonello Manacorda. Later concert listings also connect her work with Nabil Shehata, Ana Maria Patiño-Osorio and Nayden Todorov, among others.

Bashkirova's recent and documented European engagements include solo recitals and chamber appearances in Berlin, Tallinn, Naples, Wrocław, Hamburg, Lisbon, London, Vienna and Paris, as well as orchestral appearances in Romania, France, Switzerland and Israel. Her last seasons included a solo recital in the Chamber Music Hall of the Berliner Philharmonie, a performance at the Eesti Concert Piano Festival in Tallinn, a recital at the Teatro San Carlo in Naples, a concert at the Romanian Athenaeum in Bucharest with the Sofia Philharmonic Orchestra conducted by Nayden Todorov, engagements with the George Enescu Philharmonic Orchestra under Nabil Shehata, the Orchestre National de Bordeaux Aquitaine under Ana Maria Patiño-Osorio and the Transylvanian State Philharmonic Orchestra of Cluj under Lawrence Foster.

== Festivals and artistic direction ==
In 1998, Bashkirova founded the Jerusalem International Chamber Music Festival, where she has served as artistic director. The festival takes place annually in September and brings together international soloists and chamber musicians. In a 2024 article on the festival's 27th edition, The Jerusalem Post described Bashkirova as the festival's founder and artistic director and quoted her description of the project as an effort to enrich the cultural life of Jerusalem.

In 2012, Bashkirova established Intonations, a Berlin-based sister festival connected with the Jerusalem festival. Deutschlandfunk Kultur described Intonations as an offshoot of her Jerusalem chamber music festival and noted that its programmes bring together musicians invited by Bashkirova. The festival was originally held at the Jewish Museum Berlin and later moved to the Kühlhaus Berlin.

Through the Jerusalem Chamber Music Festival Ensemble and related projects, Bashkirova has appeared at festivals and concert series including the Lucerne Festival, the Rheingau Musik Festival, the George Enescu Festival in Bucharest and the Beethovenfest in Bonn. A 2012 article in concerti described how she developed the Jerusalem festival after a 1996 visit to the city and later brought the festival's spirit to Berlin through Intonations.

== Recordings and awards ==
Bashkirova has made recordings as a solo pianist and chamber musician. Her recording of Tchaikovsky's The Seasons, Op. 37a, and Album for the Young, Op. 39, received the 2017 ICMA award in the solo instrument category. Her complete recording of Antonín Dvořák's Poetic Tone Pictures, Op. 85, was released in 2020, and an album of Mozart sonatas and fantasies followed in 2022.

In 2018, Bashkirova received the Ruhr Piano Festival Prize. She has also received an honorary doctorate from Ben-Gurion University of the Negev. In 2020, she became president of the Felix-Mendelssohn-Bartholdy-Stiftung in Leipzig, succeeding conductor Kurt Masur.

== Personal life ==
Bashkirova has been married twice. Her first marriage was to Gidon Kremer. In 1988, she married conductor and pianist Daniel Barenboim. Bashkirova and Barenboim had met in the early 1980s, while Barenboim was still married to Jacqueline du Pré. During the last years of du Pré's life, Barenboim and Bashkirova lived together in Paris. The couple has two sons, David Arthur Barenboim (born 1982), a manager-writer for hip-hop bands, and Michael Barenboim (born 1985), a classical violinist.
