= Pyotr Ryazanov =

Russian composer

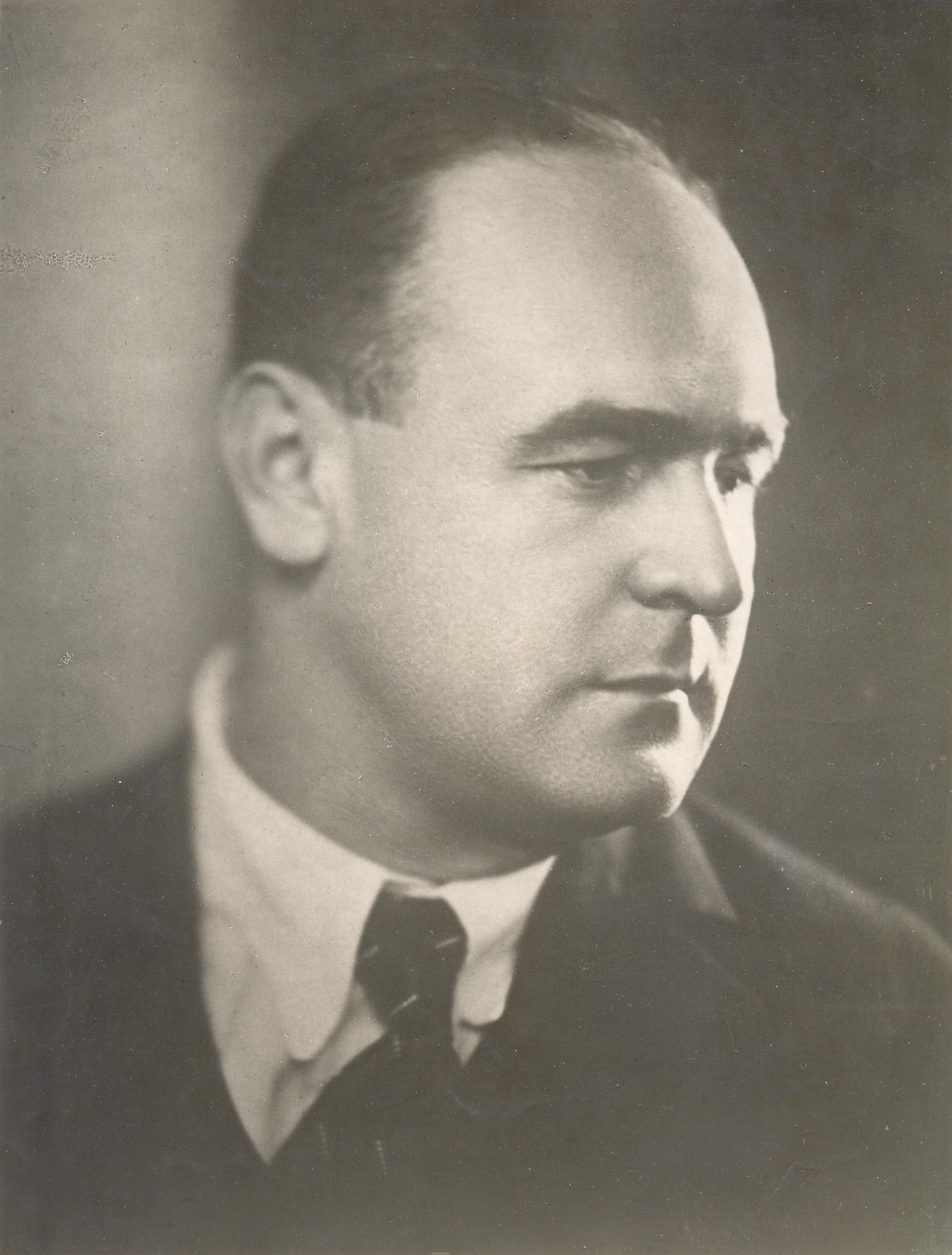
Pyotr Ryazanov. Late 1930s

Pyotr Borisovich Ryazanov (Russian: Пётр Борисович Рязанов; 21 October 1899 [O.S. 9 October] – 11 October 1942) was a Russian composer, teacher, and musicologist.

== Biography ==
Born in Narva into a musical family, he entered the Saint Petersburg Conservatory, where he studied composition with Nikolay Sokolov and Aleksandr Zhitomirsky, orchestration with Maximilian Steinberg and fugue with Leonid Vladimirovich Nikolayev.

Ryazanov started teaching at the Conservatory in 1925. He taught, among others, Georgy Sviridov, Andria Balanchivadze, Nikita Bogoslovsky, Aleksandre Machavariani, Anatoly Novikov, Tamara Antonovna Shaverzashvili, Dagmara Slianova-Mizandari, Vasily Solovyov-Sedoi, Orest Yevlakhov, Boris Mayzel, and Ivan Dzerzhinsky.

He was particularly interested in folk music.

Ryazanov was evacuated from Leningrad to Tashkent during the blockade. He died in Tbilisi from typhoid fever.
