= Dagmara Slianova-Mizandari =

Dagmara Levanovna Slianova-Mizandari (Georgian: დაგმარა სლიანოვა-მიზანდარი; 28 December 1910 - 21 March1983) was a composer born in the Republic of Georgia. Slianova-Mizandari studied at the Tbilisi State Conservatoire. She graduated in 1933, received a diploma in composition in 1935, and taught there until 1938. Her teachers included Boris Arapov, Mikhail Bagrinovsky, Pyotr Ryazanov, Ana Tulashvili, and Iona Tuskiya.

Slianova-Mizandari’s works were published by Tbilisi: Education and Tbilisi: Georgian Branch of the Music Foundation of the USSR. They are archived at the National Parliamentary Library of Georgia. Her works include:

== Chamber ==
- Pages of the Album (clarinet and piano)
- Quintet
- Romance (cello and piano)

== Pedagogy ==
- A Collection of Musical Dictations
- Solfeggio

== Piano ==
- Five Pieces for Children
- Preludes
- Six Pieces for Children
- Two Plays for Piano
