= Konstantin Mikeladze =

20th century Georgian aristocrat

Prince Konstantin (Kostia) Mikeladze (1895–1935) was born in Tbilisi, Georgia into the Mikeladze Georgian noble family, known from at least the 14th century, then part of Imperial Russia. Konstantin's family belonged to the aristocratic and sophisticated circles in Russia before the Russian revolution in 1917. Prince (knyaz) Simone Mikeladze, Konstantin's father, had six children – three girls and three boys as follows:

- Konstantin Mikeladze (1895–1927)
- Grigor Mikeladze (1898–1955)
- Evgeni Mikeladze (1903–1937)
- Ketto Mikeladze
- Tamara Mikeladze
- Anastasia Mikeladze

Konstantin attended the Imperial Russian Cavalry School in Tbilisi and afterwards joined the Army.

Kostia Mikeladze came to Iran after General Anton Denikin's defeat in the Russian Civil War against the Red Army, around 1919. He joined the Swedish trained Iranian Gendarmerie with his Russian rank.

At that time the Iranian Gendarmerie and Army were fighting the separatist movements around the country and strengthening the powers of the Iranian Central Government in the different regions. One of these campaigns was against the Kurds and the Simko fighters.

In December 1920, the Gendarmerie expeditionary corps, reinforced by about 100 horsemen from Maku, started an offensive towards Simko who had openly rebelled and occupied the towns of Urmia, Dilman and other regions. This detachment was attacked by about 2,000 Kurds led by Simko. Konstantin Mikeladze was the commander of one squadron, while Captain Hasan Arfa commanded the other. After three hours of heavy fighting the Gendarmes lost about sixty soldiers amongst them Prince Konstantin Mikeladze who had displayed great bravery under fire.

For his utmost bravery in the service of the Iranian Army, Prince Konstantin Mikeladze was awarded one of the highest military honors, "Neshane Eftekhar" or "Medal of Honor".
