= Boris Mayzel =

Russian composer

Boris Sergeyevich Mayzel' (Russian: Борис Серге́евич Майзель, 17 June 1907 [O.S. 4 June] – 9 July 1986) was a Soviet composer.

He was born in Saint Petersburg to a family of physicist Sergey Mayzel. He studied with Maximilian Steinberg and Pyotr Ryazanov at the Leningrad Conservatory. He graduated in 1936. Early on, he had worked on stage works.

He participated in the civil defense of Leningrad during the blockade. He was afterwards evacuated to Sverdlovsk from 1942 to 1944.

He lived in Moscow from 1944 to his death.

He primarily wrote symphonies, but his works also include concertos and operas.
