= Dmitri Bashkirov =

Russian pianist and educator (1931–2021)

- Born: Dmitri Aleksandrovich Bashkirov; Дми́трий Алекса́ндрович Башки́ров; November 1, 1931; Tbilisi, Georgian SSR, Transcaucasian SFSR, USSR
- Died: March 7, 2021 (aged 89); Madrid, Spain
- Occupations: Classical pianist; Academic teacher
- Organizations: Moscow Conservatory; Queen Sofia College of Music
- Awards: People's Artist of the RSFSR; Order of Alfonso X the Wise

Dmitri Aleksandrovich Bashkirov (Russian: Дми́трий Алекса́ндрович Башки́ров; November 1, 1931 – March 7, 2021) was a Russian pianist and academic teacher. Trained in his hometown Tbilisi and Moscow, he began an international career as a soloist when he won the Marguerite Long Piano Competition in Paris in 1955. He taught at the Moscow Conservatory from 1957 to 1991, and at the Queen Sofia College of Music in Madrid from 1991 to 2021. He taught also as a guest at other international conservatories and he is regarded as a representative of the Russian piano school.

== Life and career ==
Bashkirov was born in Tbilisi, Georgia. His great-aunt Lina Stern, a biochemist, physiologist and humanist, was the first female member of the Soviet Academy of Sciences. He studied at the Tbilisi Conservatory for ten years with Anastasia Virsaladze, then at the Moscow Conservatory with Aleksandr Goldenweiser.

=== Pianist ===
He achieved a first prize at the Marguerite Long Piano Competition in Paris in 1955, which opened the way to international concerts, with orchestras such as the Gewandhaus Orchestra, the Royal Philharmonic Orchestra, the Israel Philharmonic, and the Chicago Symphony Orchestra, including conductors like Vladimir Ashkenazy, Sir John Barbirolli, Daniel Barenboim, Igor Markevich, Kurt Masur, Zubin Mehta, Kurt Sanderling, Wolfgang Sawallisch, Evgeny Svetlanov, George Szell, Yuri Temirkanov and Carlo Zecchi. He played chamber music with Igor Bezrodny (violin) and Mikhail Khomitzer. Bashkirov became an Honored Artist of the RSFSR in 1968. In 1980, his international career was interrupted by a ban of concerts outside Russia, revoked in 1988 by Mikhail Gorbachev. Bashkirov was awarded the People's Artist of the RSFSR in 1990.

Bashkirov was a recording artist with the Swiss classical record label Claves, recording concerts of Carl Philipp Emanuel Bach and Beethoven. He recorded an album with piano music from a Haydn sonata to Rodion Shchedrin's Piano Sonata No. 1. A reviewer noted his "often unusual, highly imaginative interpretations", excelling in "virtuosic, romantic-period works, ... deploying lightness of touch and brilliant technique", and playing Schubert "unusually free in both rhythm and tempo". His playing of Rachmaninoff's music was described by a reviewer of the FAZ as of a "bold, sometimes steely elegance" ("kühne, manchmal stählerne Eleganz").

=== Teaching ===
Bashkirov taught at the Moscow Conservatory from 1957 to 1991. He also held master courses in connection with the Jyväskylä Summer Festival in 1968-1972 and 1977-1979. In 1991, he moved to the Reina Sofía School of Music in Madrid, where he held the chair for piano from its beginning in 1991. He taught many internationally renowned artists such as Dmitri Alexeev, Arcadi Volodos, Nikolai Demidenko, his daughter Elena Bashkirova, Boris Bloch, Jonathan Gilad, Kirill Gerstein, Stanislav Ioudenitch, Denis Kozhukhin, Eldar Nebolsin, Luis Fernando Pérez, Dang Thai Son, Vestards Šimkus, David Kadouch, Jong Hwa Park, Claudio Martinez Mehner, Bruno Vlahek and Plamena Mangova. He also taught at the International Piano Academy on Lake Como, the Shanghai Conservatory, the Chapelle musicale Reine Élisabeth in Brussels, the Paris Conservatoire, the Salzburg Mozarteum, the Sibelius Academy in Helsinki, and the Encuentro de Música y Academia in Santander. He was awarded the Grand Cross of the Order of Alfonso X the Wise in 2006. In June 2019, he was awarded an Emeritus Professor Medal from Queen Sofia.

=== Juror ===
Bashkirov served regularly in the juries of prestigious piano competitions, including the Paloma O'Shea International Piano Competition in Santander in 1995, 1998 and 2002. He was juror for the Artur Rubinstein Competition in 1992, 1998 and 2011.

=== Family and death ===
Bashkirov had a daughter, Elena, who is married to Daniel Barenboim. His son, Kirill Bashkirov, is a photographer specialised in portraiture, landscape and sports.

Bashkirov died in Madrid on March 7, 2021, at age 89.
