= Iona Tuskia =

Soviet composer

Iona Tuskiya (Georgian: იონა ტუსკია; 1901–1963) was a Soviet composer from Georgia SSR. He composed music for various movies, such as Eliso in 1928. In 1943, he along with several other composers, had entries for a contest to find out what song should be chosen as the National Anthem of the Soviet Union; the contest was eventually won by Alexander Alexandrov. His students included composers Vaja Azarashvili, Dagmara Slianova-Mizandari and Tamara Antonovna Shaverzashvili. He was a recipient of the title People's Artist of the Georgian SSR.
