= Boris Arapov =

Russian composer

- Born: Boris Aleksandrovich Arapov; September 12, 1905; Saint Petersburg, Russian Empire
- Died: January 27, 1992 (aged 86); Saint Petersburg, Russia
- Occupation: Composer

Boris Aleksandrovich Arapov (Russian: Бори́с Алекса́ндрович Ара́пов; 12 September 1905 in Saint Petersburg – 27 January 1992 in Saint Petersburg) was a Soviet and Russian composer. People's Artist of the RSFSR (1976).

== Life and career ==
Arapov grew up in Poltava, Ukraine, and took his first musical instruction class there. He moved to Petrograd (formerly Saint Petersburg) in 1921, and took piano lessons with Maria Yudina. However, a hand disease later forced him to abandon piano playing. His instruction class in composition started in 1923 at the Leningrad Conservatory, where he was taught by, amongst others, Vladimir Shcherbachov.

He later became a teacher at the conservatory, and a professor in 1940. In 1951, he became the director of the faculty for orchestration and the faculty of composition in 1976. He received titles of People's Artist of the RSFSR (1976) and Order of Lenin (1986). His students included the Georgian composer Dagmara Slianova-Mizandari.

Arapov oriented himself first of all towards the officially desirable composition style and worked primarily with nationalist elements, mainly restricting his subject matter to Russian folklore. However, from around 1960, his compositional style started to become more experimental, introducing a more complicated harmonic, rhythmic and sound colour. As subject matter, he more often selected works of literature. Although this later work is generally tonal, the levels of internal discord are higher than previously. In his very last works, Arapov introduced a religious subject matter.

== Selected works ==
=== Orchestral ===
- Symphony No. 1 in C minor (1947)
- Symphony No. 2 in D major (1959)
- Symphony No. 3 (1963)
- Symphony No. 4 for voices, choir and orchestra (1975)
- Symphony No. 5 (1981)
- Symphony No. 6 for voices, choir and orchestra (1983)
- Symphony No. 7 (1991)
- Concerto for orchestra (1969)
- "Tajik Suite" (1938)
- "Russian Suite" (1951)
- Violin Concerto (1963/64)
- Concerto for violin, piano, percussion and chamber orchestra (1973)
- "The Revelation of St John" for cello, piano, percussion and string orchestra (1989)

=== Stage works and other vocal music ===
- "Hodja Nasreddin", comic opera (1944)
- "The frigate "Victory", opera with text by Alexander Pushkin (1959)
- "Rain", chamber opera from W. Somerset Maugham (1967)
- "The Picture of Dorian Gray", ballet from Oscar Wilde (1971)
- "Four Seasons", vocal cycle for soprano, tenor and nine instrumentals (1978)

=== Chamber music ===
- Trio with Mongolian themes, for clarinet, viola and piano (1938)
- Violin Sonata (1978)
- Cello Sonata (1985)
- Horn Sonata (1981)
- Sonata for solo violin (1930)
- Quintet for oboe, horn, harp, viola and cello (1979)

=== Piano music ===
- Piano Sonata No. 1 (1970)
- Piano Sonata No. 2 (1976)
- Piano Sonata No. 3 (1987)
- Piano Sonata No. 4 (1990)
- Piano Sonata No. 5 "De profundis" (1992)
