= Ioseb Grishashvili =

Georgian poet and historian

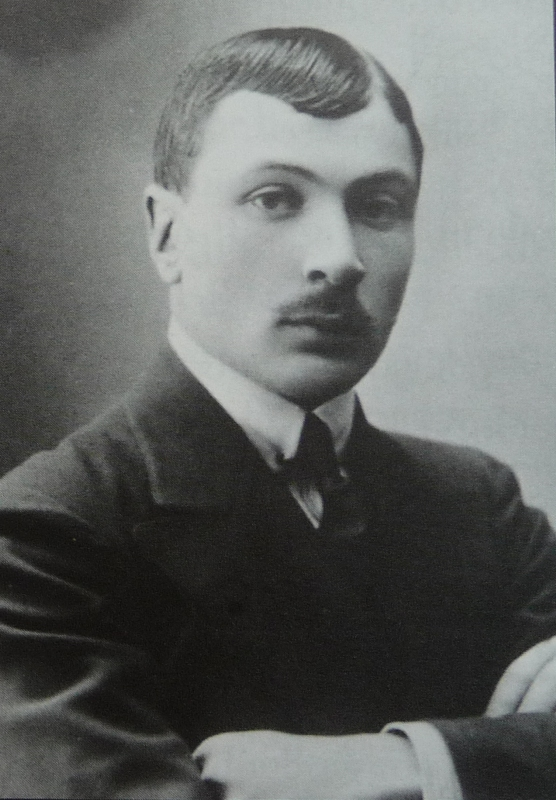
Grishashvili

Ioseb Grishashvili (Georgian: იოსებ გრიშაშვილი) was a pen name of Ioseb Mamulishvili (Georgian: იოსებ მამულიშვილი; born 12 April/24 April 1889 – died 3 August 1965) was a noted poet and historian from Georgia. A history museum in Tbilisi, his birth- and death place is named for him. Composer Tamara Antonovna Shaverzashvili used his text for her song “Regret.”

Grishashvili became a member of the Georgian National Academy of Sciences in 1946.
