= Momele =

Studio album by Tamara Gverdtsiteli
- Released: 26 May 2017
- Recorded: 2017
- Venues: Moscow, Russia
- Studio: Mosfilm Studio
- Genre: Pop music
- Length: 38:43
- Language: Yiddish
- Label: Universal Music Group
- Producer: Alexander Tsalyuk

Tamara Gverdtsiteli chronology
Tamara Gverdtsiteli (2016)	Momele (2017)

Professional ratings
Review scores
Source	Rating
InterMedia	3/5 stars

Momele (Yiddish: Mama) is a studio album by Georgian and Russian singer Tamara Gverdtsiteli released on 26 May 2017 by Universal Music Group. The album features the most popular Jewish songs in Yiddish. The Moscow Jewish Men's Choir and the Moscow Symphony Orchestra took part in the recording of the album.

== Overview ==
Tamara Gverdtsiteli spent her childhood in Odessa in a Jewish environment (her grandfather was a rabbi). According to her, many of the songs presented on the album were played at her home, so she wanted to remember them and convey the warm home atmosphere, and at the same time to remember the tragedy of the lives of Jewish people who were forced to leave Odessa during the war in 1941. The singer dedicated this album to her mother, and, according to her, this work is very dear to her. Gverdtsiteli selected the material for the album together with the artistic director of the Moscow Jewish Men's Chapel, Alexander Tsalyuk.

The songs from the album were presented a year before the release of the record, in June 2016 on the stage of New York's Carnegie Hall. Later, this program was called "Mamele-Mama's Eyes", with which the singer gave concerts in Russia and Israel.

== Track listing ==
No.	Title	Writer(s)	Length
1.	"My Yiddishe Momme"	Jack Yellen, Lew Pollack	5:16
2.	"Shloimele Malkele"	Joseph Rumshinsky, Isidore Lillian	3:24
3.	"Viglid"	Abraham Goldfaden	3:29
4.	"Freylekhs"	Motl Polyanskiy, Izi Kharik	2:59
5.	"Ikh Hob Dikh Tsu Fil Lib"	Chaim Tauber, Alexander Olshanetsky	4:08
6.	"Halevai"	Moshe Oysher	2:35
7.	"Momele"	Al Goodhart, Mitchell Parish, Alex Elston	4:00
8.	"Tshiribim"	Jewish Traditional	2:14
9.	"Tum Balalayka"	Jewish Traditional	2:48
10.	"Die Greene Kosine"	Abe Schwartz, Hyman Prizant	3:01
11.	"Lomir Ale In Eynem"	Jewish Traditional	4:49
Total length:			38:43
