= Meliton Balanchivadze =

Georgian opera singer and composer (1862–1937)

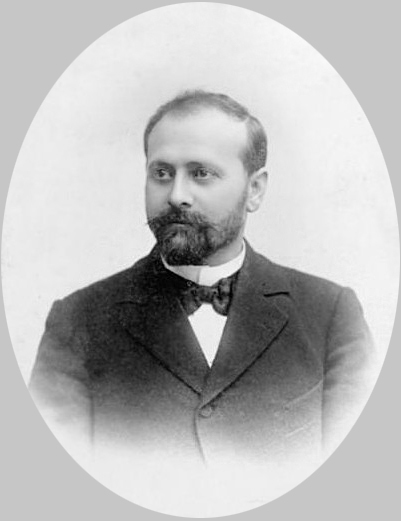
- Born: 24 December 1862; Banoja, Governorate of Kutais, Georgia, Russian Empire
- Died: 21 December 1937 (aged 74); Kutaisi, Georgian SSR, Soviet Union
- Era: 20th-century classical music

Meliton Balanchivadze (Georgian: მელიტონ ბალანჩივაძე; 24 December 1862 – 21 December 1937) was a Georgian opera singer, composer and a member of Georgia's cultural scene, both under the Russian Empire and during the country's independence. Two of his sons, George and Andria, had illustrious careers, the former as a pioneering choreographer in the United States, and the latter as Soviet Georgia's leading classical composer.

== Career ==
Born in the village of Banoja and trained at the seminaries of Kutaisi and Tbilisi, Balanchivadze began an operatic career at the Tbilisi Opera House in 1880. In 1882, he founded a Georgian folk ensemble and organized the first ever folk concert in Tbilisi in the next year. From 1883 to 1886, he travelled to various parts of Georgia, collecting folk songs and training folk choirs. From 1889 to 1895, he studied at St. Petersburg Conservatory where one of his teachers was the composer Nikolai Rimsky-Korsakov. Between 1895 and 1917, he toured Russia giving concerts of Georgian folk music.

After the 1917 Bolshevik coup, he returned to his native Georgia, where he taught and composed. He authored the first original Georgian opera, Tamar the Wily, later renamed into Darejan the Wily (თამარ ცბიერი, დარეჯან ცბიერი) — first performed by Russian artists at the Hall of the Russian Nobility Council in 1897 — as well as numerous choral works, as mass, and other church services.

== Family ==
Balanchivadze was married twice. By his first marriage, to Gayane Eristavi, he had two children. One of them, Apollon, was a colonel in the White Russian forces, notably serving in the Ice March of 1918.

He married, secondly (probably in 1905 or 1906), to Maria Nikolayevna Vasilyeva, a St. Petersburg native. The couple had three children:

- Tamara, a painter, died 1943, during the blockade of Leningrad
- George, emigrated to the United States and became an influential ballet choreographer
- Andria became a leading composer in Soviet Georgia

== Awards ==
- Order of the Red Banner of Labor (14 January 1937)
- People's Artist of the Georgian SSR (1933)

== Sources ==
- Toradze, Gulbat (2001). "Balanchivadze, Meliton". Grove Music Online.
