= Anastasia Virsaladze =

Georgian pianist (1883–1968)

Anastasia Virsaladze née Abdushelishvili, Georgian: ანასტასია ვირსალაძე; November 11, 1883 – September 5, 1968) was a Georgian concert pianist and music teacher. In 1921, she began to teach at the Tbilisi Conservatory. Promoted to professor in 1932, she remained there until her retirement in 1966, teaching over 100 pianists. Among her most prominent students were Dmitri Bashkirov, Lev Vlassenko and her own granddaughter Eliso Virsaladze.

== Biography ==
Born in Kutaisi on 11 November 1883, Anastasia Virsaladze studied at the Saint Petersburg Conservatory under Anna Yesipova, graduating in 1909 with distinction. She married Spiridon Virsaladze (1869–1930), a prominent physician in Tbilisi.

After engaging in concert performances, in 1921 she began teaching at the Tbilisi Conservatory where she was promoted to professor in 1932, heading the piano department for an extended period. She performed in Berlin in 1926 and was probably the first Georgian pianist to perform in the United States where she met many American composers, frequently playing their works.

At the Conservatory, she was active in the Talented Children Group from 1934 to 1938. During her career, she taught over a hundred pianists, including Dmitri Bashkirov, Lev Vlassenko, Aleksandre Nijaradze, Nana Dimitriadi and in particular her granddaughter Eliso Viraladze whom she taught from the age of nine. She later taught her while she was a student at the conservatory.

Anastasia Virsaladze was the first Georgian woman to receive a higher education in music. She died in Tbilisi on 5 September 1968.
