= Andria Balanchivadze =

Georgian composer (1906–1992)

Andria Balanchivadze ანდრია ბალანჩივაძე
- Born: June 1, 1906; Saint Petersburg, Russian Empire
- Died: April 28, 1992 (aged 85) Tbilisi, Georgia
- Occupation: Composer
- Award: Hero of Socialist Labor

Andria Melitonis dze Balanchivadze (Note: Georgian: ანდრია მელიტონის ძე ბალანჩივაძე, romanized: Andria Melit’onis dze Balanchivadze; Russian: Андрей Мелитонович Баланчивадзе, romanized: Andrey Melitonovich Balanchivadze) (1 June 1906 [O.S. 19 May] – 28 April 1992) was a Georgian composer. He was the son of composer Meliton Balanchivadze and brother of ballet choreographer George Balanchine.

== Biography ==
Born in Saint Petersburg, Russian Empire, he graduated from the Tbilisi State Conservatoire in 1927 and Leningrad Conservatory in 1931, where he studied with Pyotr Ryazanov. Upon his return to Georgia, he became the musical director of several theatres from 1931 to 1934.

Having barely survived Joseph Stalin's purges, he became a professor at the Tbilisi Conservatory in 1942 and served as an artistic director of the Georgian State Symphony from 1941 to 1948. He became a major influence in musical politics as chair (1953), and first secretary (1955–1961, 1968–1972) of the Union of Georgian Composers. Balanchivadze’s numerous symphonies, pianoforte concertos, and compositions for the stage heavily contributed to modern Georgian classical music. He also authored the first Georgian ballet, The Heart of the Mountains (1936).

He was granted the titles of the People's Artist of the Georgian SSR in 1957, People's Artist of the USSR in 1968, and awarded several prizes, including the Stalin Prize in 1944 and the Shota Rustaveli State Prize in 1969.

== Sources ==
- Toradze, Gulbat (2001). "Balanchivadze, Andria". Grove Music Online.
