= Evgeni Mikeladze =

Georgian musician (1903–1937)

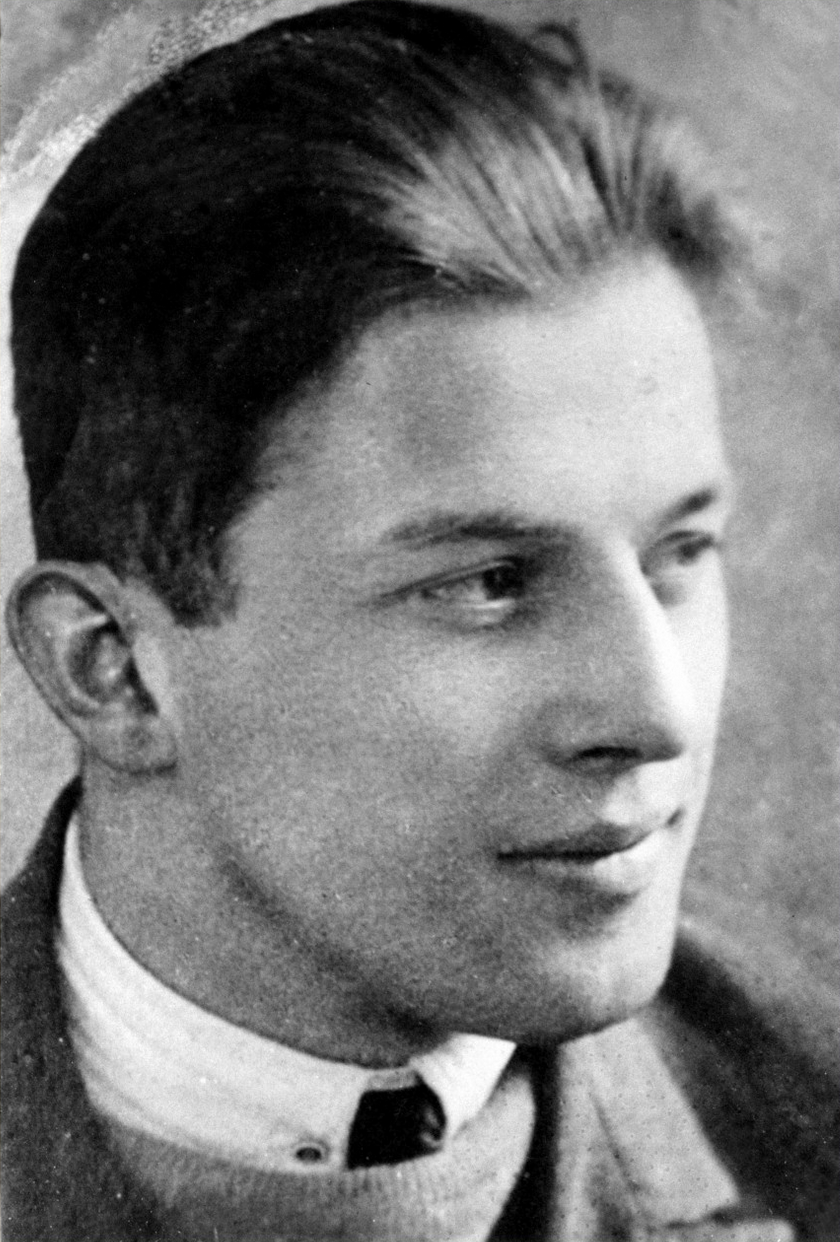
Evgeni Mikeladze

Evgeni Simonis dze Mikeladze (Georgian: ევგენი მიქელაძე; July 27, 1903 – December 22, 1937) was an eminent Georgian orchestra conductor of the 1930s. He was among the leading Georgian cultural figures who got caught up in Joseph Stalin's Great Purge, leading to his torture and execution in 1937, at the age of 34.

Since 1994, the Georgian Philharmonic Orchestra has carried his name.

== Biography ==
Mikeladze was born in Baku, Russian Empire to Georgian parents, Simon Mikeladze and Mariam Eristavi. He was part of the Georgian nobility, belonging to the family of Mikeladze on his father's side and Eristavi on his mother's side. A few years after his birth, the Mikeladze family relocated back to Tbilisi. Mikeladze had seven siblings, among them Keto Mikeladze.

He attended musical classes at the Cadet Corps, Tbilisi Real School and finally entered the Tbilisi State Conservatoire. Since his childhood, he played various wind instruments, chiefly the trumpet and the French horn, and decided to become a conductor in the mid-1920s. He then took courses at the Leningrad State Conservatory under the guidance of eminent Soviet conductors, Nicolai Malko and Alexander Gauk. Back to Tbilisi in 1931, he quickly gained notability as a talented conductor and a promoter of classical music, and earned appraisal from several Soviet and foreign musicians. He organized and led, in 1933, the National Symphony Orchestra of Georgia. A year later, he became a chief conductor at the Tbilisi Opera House.

At the age of 33, he was awarded the title of Honored Art Worker of the Georgian SSR (1936), and a year later, the Order of the Red Banner of Labour. Mikeladze’s productive career was soon to be abruptly terminated, however. He was married to the daughter of Mamia Orakhelashvili, an Old Bolshevik who was purged under Stalin in 1937. Mikeladze was also arrested in November 1937 and subjected to forty-eight days of interrogation and torture, being allegedly questioned and beaten also by Lavrentiy Beria. Eventually, Mikeladze was sentenced to be shot by the NKVD troika.

In a newly independent post-Soviet Georgia, his name has been given to the National Symphony Orchestra founded and led by Mikeladze.

Evgeni Mikeladze was survived by his son, Vakhtang Mikeladze, who became a documentary film maker and a recipient of the USSR State Prize.

== See also ==
- Sandro Akhmeteli
- Dimitri Shevardnadze
