= Aleksi Machavariani =

Georgian composer and conductor (1913–1995)

- ალექსი მაჭავარიანი
- Machavariani, in the 1930s
- Born: 23 September 1913; Gori, Tiflis Governorate, Russian Empire
- Died: 31 December 1995 (aged 82); Tbilisi, Georgia
- Occupations: Composer; conductor; music pedagogue

Aleksi Davitis dze Machavariani (Note: Georgian: ალექსი დავითის ძე მაჭავარიანი, romanized: Aleksi Davitis dze Mach'avariani; Russian: Алексей Давидович Мачавариани, romanized: Aleksey Davidovich Machavariani.) (23 September 1913 – 31 December 1995) was a Soviet and Georgian composer, conductor and pedagogue. He was granted the title of People's Artist of the USSR in 1958.

== Biography ==
Aleksi Machavariani was born in Gori, Russian Empire. He graduated from the Tbilisi Conservatory in 1936 and remained there for postgraduate studies. He studied composition under Pyotr Ryazanov. Later he joined the faculty, becoming a professor in 1963. He began his artistic career in 1935.

Machavariani produced a number of critically acclaimed plays and ballets, including the ballet "Othello" (1957) and "Hamlet" (~1964), (Note: Despite some interest in the work, Hamlet only saw one performance, the 1964 premiere in Tbilisi, which was performed in Georgian. Machavariani considered Othello "full of human emotions and the power of love", but Hamlet as the problem of existence and death.) the operas "Mat i Sin" (Mother and Son, 1945), "Den moei Rodini" (Day of My Motherland, 1954), the symphony "Piat monologov" (Five Monologues, 1971; it earned the Shota Rustaveli Prize). He also wrote the music to many theatrical productions, including "Baratashvili" and "Legenda o liubvi"(Legend of Love). His output includes among other works also a violin concerto (1950), seven symphonies (1947–1992) and six string quartets (the last in 1993).

He was the artistic director of the Georgian State Symphony Orchestra from 1956 till 1958 and directed the Composers' Union of Georgia from 1962 till 1968.

His son, Vakhtang Machavariani, was also a composer and conducted his father's works.

== Awards and honors ==
- Honored Art Worker of the Georgian SSR (1950)
- Stalin Prize, 3rd class (1951)
- People's Artist of the USSR (1958)
- Order of the Badge of Honour (1963)
- Order of Lenin (1966)
- Shota Rustaveli Prize (1971)
- Order of the Red Banner of Labour (1973)
- Order of Honor (Georgia) (1995)

== Discography ==
=== As Composer ===
His son Vakhtang Machavariani conducted several of his works:

- Machavariani, A.; Mačavariani, Vaxtang; Leningradskiĭ gosudarstvennyĭ akademicheskiĭ teatr opery i baleta imeni S.M. Kirova Orkestr (1988), Simfonii︠a︡ no 3 : odnochastnai︠a︡ (in no linguistic content), [Tbilisi]: Melodii︠a︡, OCLC 34302032
- Machavariani, A.; Mačavariani, Vaxtang; Leningradskiĭ gosudarstvennyĭ akademicheskiĭ teatr opery i baleta imeni S.M. Kirova Orkestr (1990), Simpʻonia no. 5 : Ušba (in no linguistic content), [Soviet Union]: Melodii︠a︡, OCLC 30962664
- Machavariani, A.; Mačavariani, Vaxtang; Leningradskai︠a︡ gosudarstvennai︠a︡ filarmonii︠a︡. Akademicheskiĭ simfonicheskiĭ orkestr (1987), Simfonii︠a︡ no 1 (in no linguistic content), [Moscow]: Melodii︠a︡, OCLC 1013903536
- Machavariani, A.; Mačavariani, Vaxtang; Shakespeare, William; Leningradskiĭ gosudarstvennyĭ akademicheskiĭ teatr opery i baleta imeni S.M. Kirova Orkestr (1986), Otello : balet (in no linguistic content), [Soviet Union]: Melodii︠a︡, OCLC 30962665
- Machavariani, A.; Mačavariani, Vaxtang; Rozanova, Natalʹi︠a︡.; Rustaveli, Shota; Gosudarstvennyĭ simfonicheskiĭ orkestr Ministerstva kulʹtury SSSR (1983), The man in the panther's skin (in no linguistic content), USSR: Melodii︠a︡, OCLC 31808306
