= Mikeladze =

Georgian noble family

The Coat of arms of Princes Mikeladze

The House of Mikeladze (Georgian: მიქელაძე) was a Georgian noble family, known from at least the 14th century. The senior, and the princely, line of the Mikeladze flourished in Imereti (western Georgia), while a collateral branch was later established as the petite nobles Mikelashvili (მიქელაშვილი) in Kartli (central Georgia).

== History ==
One of the earliest mentions of the Mikeladze family can be found in the 1325/6 synodal records from the Tbeti Cathedral (now in Turkey) whereby King Michael of Imereti sanctions a reparational payment (sasiskhlo, a Georgian equivalent of weregild) by a certain Gogitashvili to Mikeladze. The Mikeladze's princely domain in Imereti, known as Samikeladzeo (სამიქელაძეო; "of Mikeladze"), was centered on the village of Kulashi on the right bank of the Rioni River, where their familial castle and church were located. They were incessantly involved in the civil wars that plagued Imereti from the 15th century into the 19th. After the Russian conquest of Imereti in 1810, the family was integrated into the Russian nobility and confirmed as a princely house (knyaz) in 1850.

The family has produced several military officers and intellectuals. Many of them made career in the Imperial Russian service. A notable example was the seasoned prince Kaikhosro Mikeladze who organized a volunteer company of his kinsmen to fight the invading Ottoman army during the Eastern War (1853–56). Later in the 19th century and early in the 20th, seven of the Mikeladze attained to the rank of general in the imperial army. These were: Almaskhan Otiyevich Mikeladze (1834-1915), Dmitri Otiyevich Mikeladze (1838-1910), Nikolay Romanovich Mikeladze (1841-1898), Alexander Konstantinovich Mikeladze (1863-1919), Konstantin Almaskhanovich Mikeladze (1866-1914), Alexander Platonovich Mikeladze (1867-1928), and Vyacheslav Artemiyevich Mikeladze (1874-1951), the latter also being an artillery specialist in the Red Army. Shalva Yefemovich Mikeladze (1895-1976) was a great mathematician. By Simone Mikeladze, numerous other noted individuals are known, such as Grigor Mikeladze, colonel in the Iranian army, his brother Konstantin Mikeladze who was also Iranian military commander, as well as their brother Evgeni Mikeladze (1903-1937), who was a conductor and was killed during the Great Terror. His son is a documentary director Vakhtang Yevgenievich Mikeladze (1937- nowadays).
