= Ioseb Bardanashvili =

Israeli and Georgian composer

Ioseb Bardanashvili (Georgian: იოსებ (სოსო) ბარდანაშვილი; Hebrew: יוסף ברדנשווילי; born 23 November 1948 in Batumi, Georgia) is an Israeli and Georgian composer. His works span classical to contemporary composition for film.

== Biographical information ==
A graduate [1975] with a DMus in composition. from the Music Academy of Tbilisi having studied from the tutelage of Alexander Shaverzashvili and Head of the Musical Academy at Batovei. Bardanashvili held office as Deputy Culture Minister of the autonomous region Adjaria in Georgia in 1993-94 Since 1995 he has lived in Israel and there became also active as a painter of art having exhibited in his country of birth and also Israel.

== Additional information ==
Bardanashvili is a composer-in -residence at Raanana Simfonette orchestra from 1996-1999. Taught at Camera Obscura college between 1998 and 1999 and Bar Ilan University, and the Rubin Academy of music at Tel-Aviv University from 1998 to 2000, having there by taught Avner Dorman. Co-directed the 6th bienalle of Contemporary music at Tel Aviv. Musical Director of the International Biennial for Contemporary Music "Tempus Fugit" in Israel (2002, 2004, 2006). Spoke at the Tbilisi State Conservatoire, on the theme of Thematic festivals and tourism as a best way for evincing the country traditions and cultural background. Some pieces produced by Bardanashvili were created from commissions, (new work for the 2004-2005 season, were performed on (Saturday) January 15, 2005, at the Whitaker Center (Harrisburg, PA). During 2009, he was composer-in-residence at the Jerusalem Camerata.
