= VIA Iveria =

VIA Iveria ვია ივერია
- Origin: USSR
- Genres: Folk rock Folk music Folk pop Psychedelic rock
- Years active: 1968-?
- Labels: Melodiya

Iveria (Georgian: ივერია) was a Georgian music ensemble founded in 1968 that gained popularity in the Soviet Union in the 1970s. The group's art director was Alexander Basilaia. The group sang both Georgian folk and contemporary songs, wrote and performed Argo and Jays Wedding musicals, and released 6 vinyl albums on Melodiya label.

The band are notable for covering Uriah Heep's "July Morning" and "Sunrise" on their 1975 album Iveria. The songs were sung in their original English, but listed under Russian titles on the back of the album.

== Discography ==
- Кругозор (Horizon), 1973
- 13 лет (13 years old), 1982
