= Tbilisi State Conservatoire =

Conservatoire in Tbilisi, Georgia

- ვანო სარაჯიშვილის სახელობის თბილისის სახელმწიფო კონსერვატორია
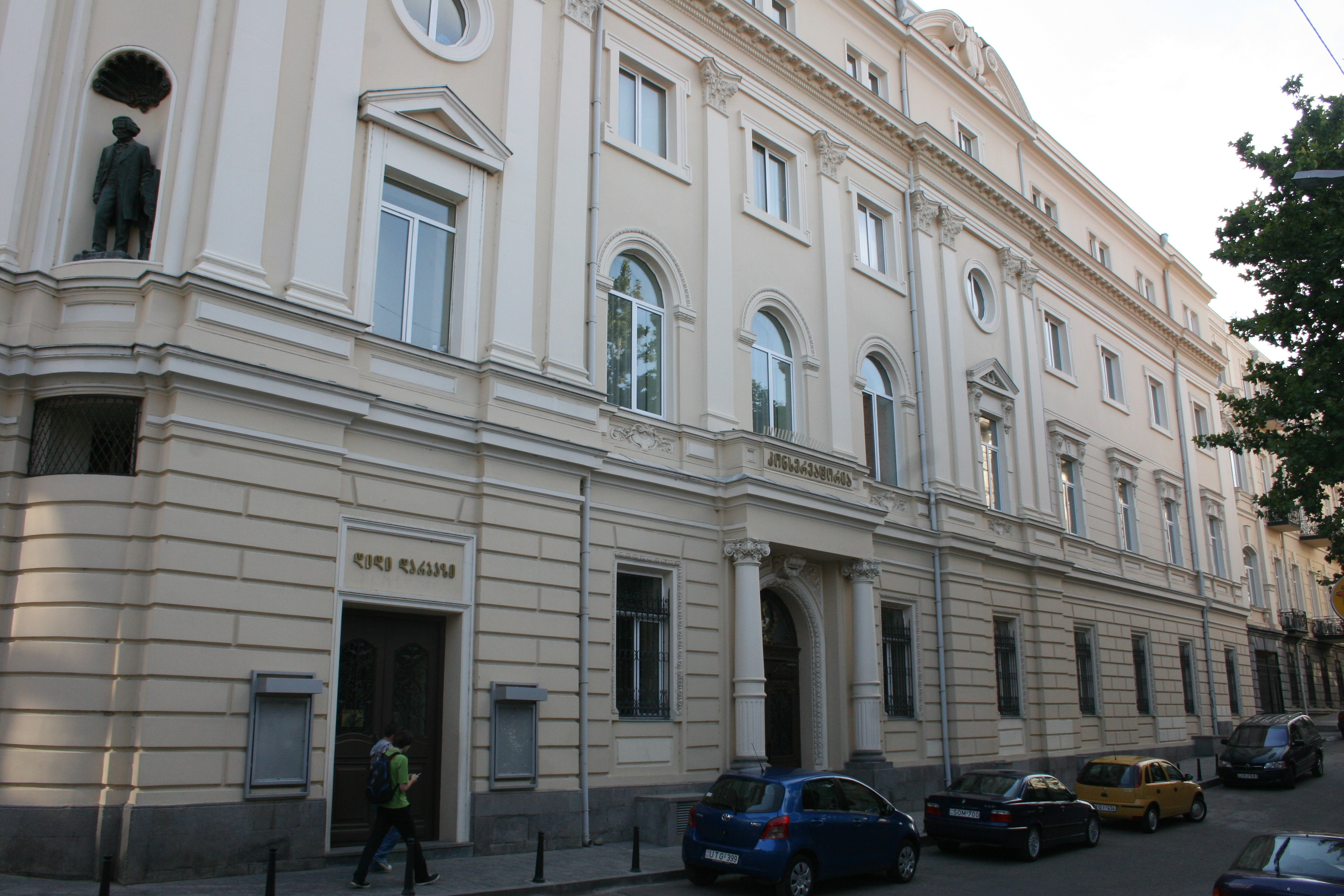
- Location: Tbilisi, Georgia
- Website: Official website

Tbilisi State Conservatoire (Georgian: თბილისის სახელმწიფო კონსერვატორია, romanized: tbilisis sakhelmts'ipo k'onservat'oria) is the State Conservatoire of Georgia, located in the capital Tbilisi.

== History ==
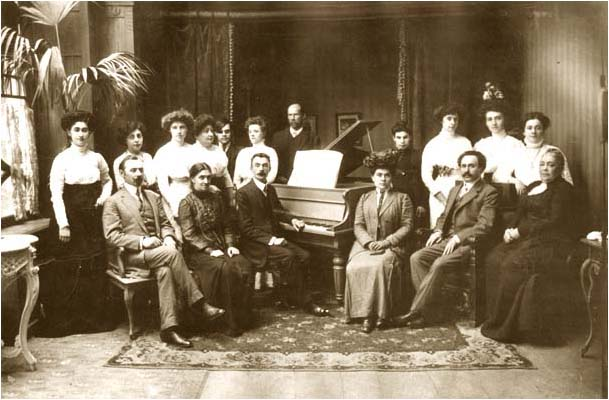
Staff of the conservatoire in 1910

The Tbilisi Conservatoire was founded on 1 May 1917 (109 years ago). It was formally recognised by the Russian Musical Society as a conservatoire later that year. A rival conservatoire was also founded in 1921 by D. Arakishvili, and it was not until 1924 that the situation was resolved by the Soviet regime in favour of the original foundation. Since 1947 it has borne the name of Georgian singer Ivane Sarajishvili.

Among the first teachers in Conservatoire were students of leading musicians such as Franz Liszt, Henryk Wieniawski, Antoine Marmontel, Tchaikovsky, and Ignaz Moscheles, as well as Joseph and Rosina Lhévinne – later founder-teachers at the Juilliard School of Music; Georgian musicians, former alumni of the Moscow Conservatory and St. Petersburg Conservatory – including Dimitri Arakishvili and Zachary Paliashvili (composers, and founders of modern Georgian music); Wanda Shiukashvili, A.Tulashvili and A.Virsaladze (pianists); L.Iashvili and L.Shiukashvili (violinists); D.Andghuladze and A.Inashvili (singers); Greek conductor Odysseas Dimitriadis and others.

At different times the Tbilisi State Conservatoire was headed by prominent Georgian and Russian musicians, among them Nikolai Nikolaev (1917-1918), Nikolai Tcherepnin (1919-1922), Tamara Vakhvakhishvili (1921-1923), Mikhail Ippolitov-Ivanov (1924-1925), Zakaria Paliashvili (1918-1919;1922-1923;1930-1931), Dimitri Arakishvili (1926-1929), Otar Taktakishvili (1962-1964), Sulkhan Tsintsadze (1965-1984), Nodar Gabunia (1984-2000), Manana Doidjashvili (2000-2012) Reso Kiknadze (2012-2019) and Nana Sharikadze (2019-2023).

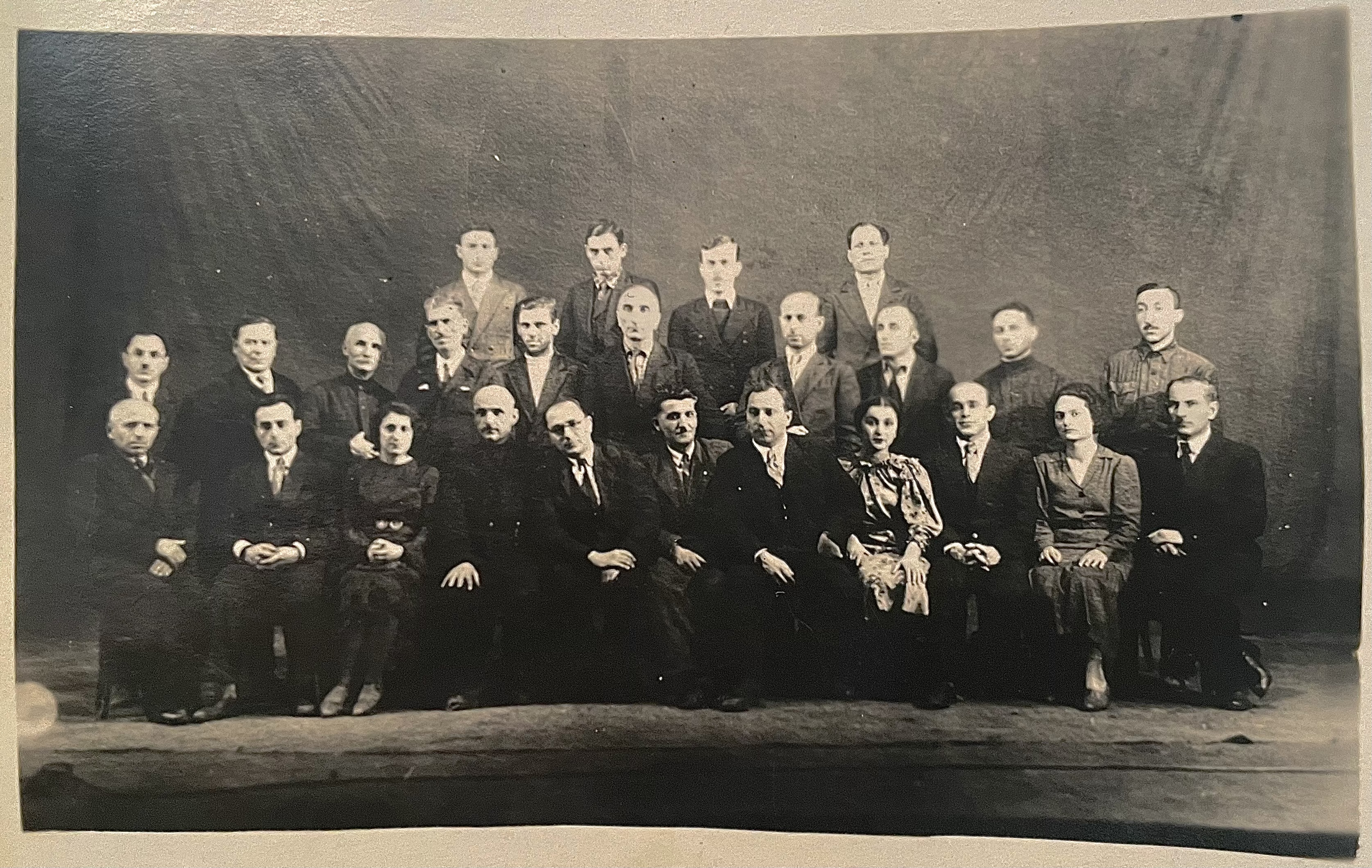
Staff, students and musicians of the Tbilisi State Conservatoire. Circa 1940.

Among the notable graduates of the Conservatoire are: composers Gia Kancheli, S. Nasidze and Dagmara Slianova-Mizandari; conductor Jansug Kakhidze; ethnomusicologist and evolutionary musicologist Joseph Jordania; musicians Elisso Virsaladze, Dimitri Bashkirov, Lev Vlassenko, Tamar Gabarashvili, Regina Gurgenyan, Alexander Toradze, Marine Iashvili, Alexander Korsantia, Giorgi Latso, Zurab Andjaparidze, Iano Alibegashvili (Tamari), Lado Ataneli, Tamar Atschba and others.

== Building ==
The small auditorium of the conservatoire features walls richly decorated in classical style.

The main auditorium of the conservatoire

The original building was designed by Aleksander Szymkiewicz and built in 1901-05. Unlike most buildings of the same style in the given period, the conservatoire's column decorated main portal is not centrally located. Rather, along with the main facade it is built near the left corner of the building in order for it to face the main entrance from the Rustaveli Avenue.

The style of the building is eclectic in nature. While original two-story building was built with elements of renaissance and baroque, the exterior of the present four-story building is neoclassical and somewhat less ornate. The exterior displays the statue of Anton Rubinstein, a Russian pianist and composer who in 1891 donated an entire income from one of his concerts for the opening of the original conservatoire building.

The main auditorium and the smaller auditorium are the two auditoriums in the building. The conservatoire's tiny auditorium is renowned for its ornately decorated walls. The main auditorium also holds an organ from the Alexander Schuke factory in Potsdam, Germany, installed in 1963.

== Activities ==
Today the conservatoire teaching staff includes about 200 professors. There are about 400 students.

Cultural events taking place at the Conservatoire include: music forums, national competitions, international symposia and scientific conferences, master classes, chamber and symphony concerts and student opera performances at the Conservatoire Opera Studio. Amongst those who have performed at the Conservatoire are Vladimir Horowitz, Egon Petri, Sviatoslav Richter, David Oistrakh, Emil Gilels, Mstislav Rostropovich and others.

Since 1995 the State Conservatoire has aligned itself with the two-step European Educational System of studies. Since 2006 the Tbilisi State Conservatoire has become a member of the European Association of Conservatories. From 2005 the Conservatoire joined the Bologna Process with its international student transfer and credit system.

On September 14, 2022 the Ministry of Culture, Sports and Youth of Georgia launched focusing on eliminating the deficiency of instruments in the Tbilisi State Conservatory. A multiyear purchase agreement was signed with world leader manufacturing company Steinway & Sons in accordance with which 78 grand pianos would gradually be transferred to the State Conservatory until 2025. Initial negotiations between Steinway & Sons and Ministry of Culture has particularly facilitated Georgian-American composer and concert pianist Giorgi Latso. Since Steinway & Sons was founded and its company history this contract is regarded as unprecedented and significant in Europe, given the fact that Georgia had a 50 year shortage for purchases.

== See also ==
- Music of Georgia

== Bibliography ==
- Rusudan Tsurtsumia (ed.), Vano Sarajishvili Tbilisi State Conservatoire, Tbilisi, 1998
- Arutinov Devil (ed.), Vano Sarajishvili Tbilisi State Conservatoire, Tbilisi, 2000
