= Lamara Chkonia =

Georgian soprano (1930–2024)

- ლამარა ჭყონია
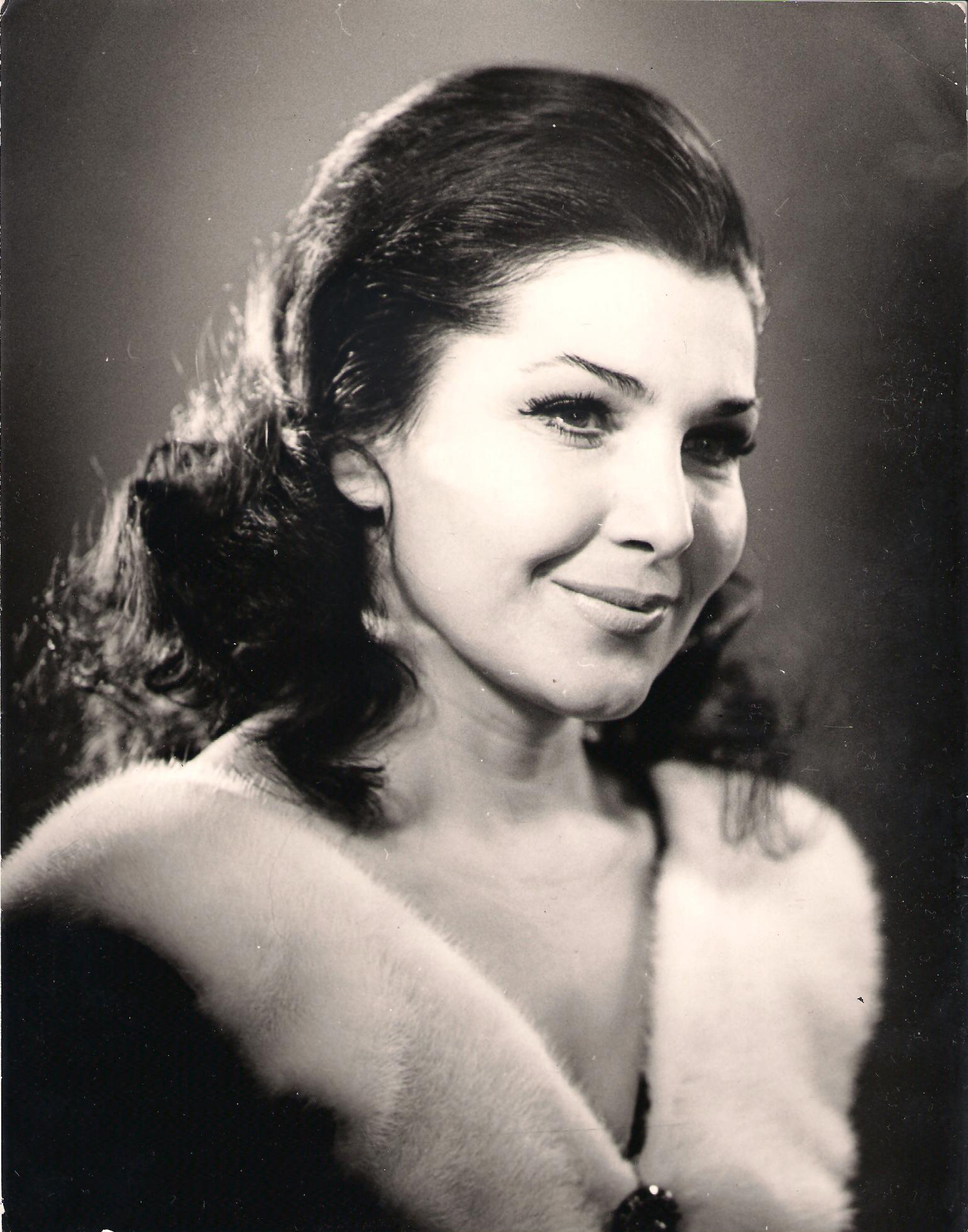
- Chkonia in 1975
- Born: 27 December 1930; Batumi, Georgian SSR, Transcaucasian SFSR, Soviet Union
- Died: 14 March 2024 (aged 93)
- Resting place: Makhata Pantheon of Writers and Public Figures, Tbilisi
- Occupation: Operatic soprano
- Years active: 1956–2024
- Spouse: Moris Lekiashvili
- Children: Eteri Lamoris; Natela Nicoli
- Website: Internet Archive collection

Lamara Chkonia (Note: Georgian: ლამარა გრიგოლის ასული ჭყონია, romanized: Lamara Grigolis asuli Ch’q’onia; Russian: Ламара Григорьевна Чкония, romanized: Lamara Grigoryevna Chkoniya) (27 December 1930 – 14 March 2024) was a Georgian soprano. As one of a number of opera singers who made contributions to the vocal culture of Georgia and the former Soviet Union, Lamara was one of the few women to break through the Iron Curtain.

== Early years ==
Chkonia was born in Georgia (then part of the Soviet Union as the Georgian SSR), to a theatrical and musical family. Her uncle Akaki Chkonia, a writer and a director of the Tbilisi Opera and Ballet Theatre, was executed in 1937 during the Great Purge. At Tbilisi State Conservatoire, she studied with Valerian Cashelli, who had performed at Milan's La Scala and other opera houses in Italy for several years. Under his tutelage, her art was influenced by the Italian school of opera. After her tenure at home in Georgia's Tbilisi Opera, she was accepted as a leading soloist of the Kiev National Opera and Ballet Theatre. During that time, she debuted in productions of other famous theaters including the Kirov Mariinsky Theatre in Saint Petersburg.

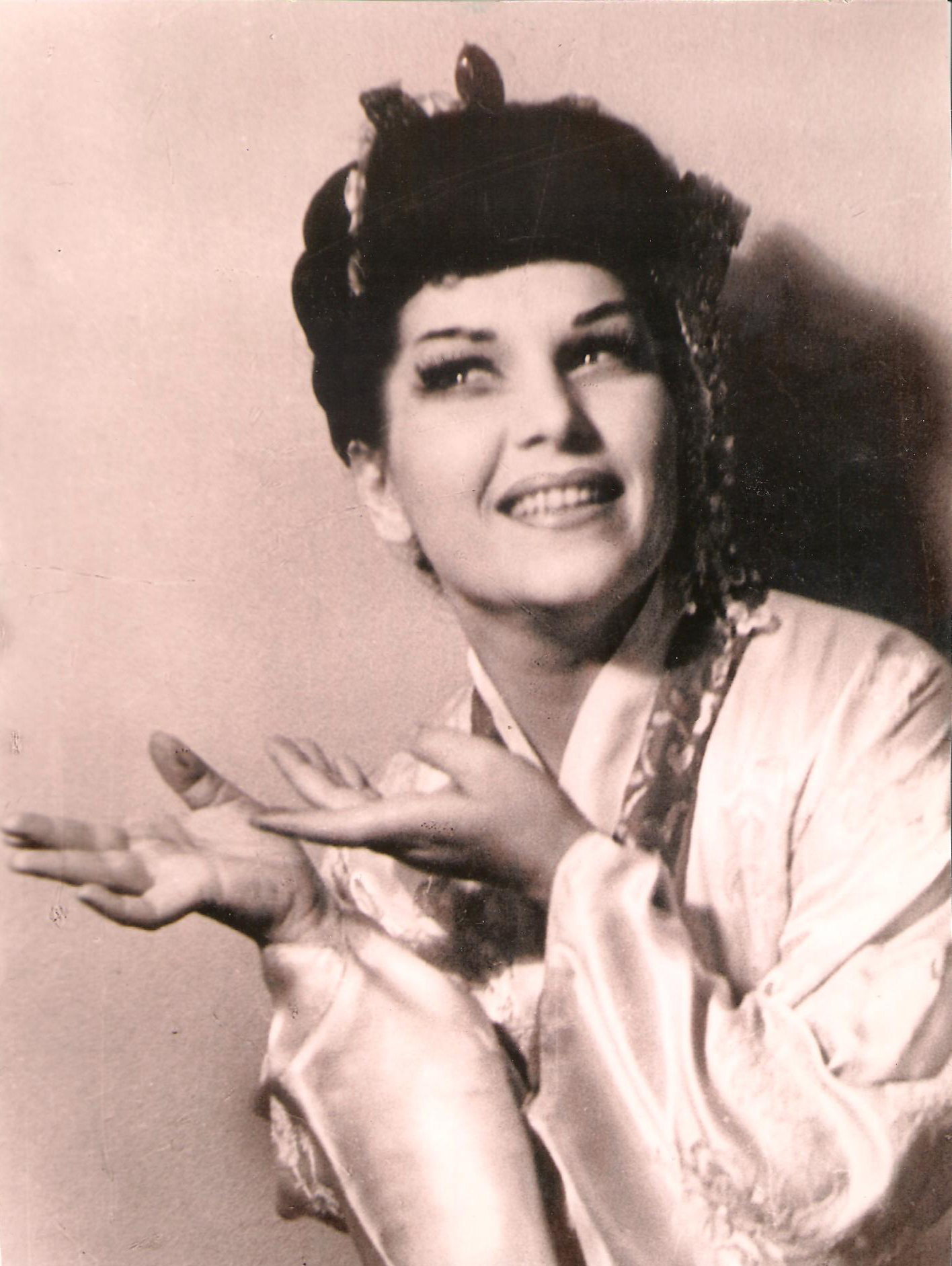
Chkonia as Madame Butterfly in 1968

"La Danza, Tarantella Napoletana" – Rossini (0:19)

"Il dolce suono" – Mad Scene, Lucia di Lammermoor Act III – Donizetti (0:30)

"Le Rossignol et la Rose" (Vocalise) – Saint-Saëns (0:32)

"Otvernites ne glyadite" – Gurilyov (0:22)

"Serenade from Ruy Blas" – Weckerlin (0:18)

"Solovey" (The Nightingale) – Alyabyev (0:28)
Lamara Chkonia with the Bolshoi Theatre Orchestra, conducted by Mark Ermler (1973)

Chkonia's repertoire consisted of about 40 opera roles, including the title roles of Verdi's La traviata, Puccini's Madama Butterfly, Gilda in Verdi's Rigoletto, Marguerite in Gounod's Faust, Rosina in Rossini's Il barbiere di Siviglia, and the title role of Daisi by Zakaria Paliashvili.

Chkonia made many recordings, including 15 CDs (over 250 works) for the "Golden Fund of the USSR" with the National Radio of Moscow, Tbilisi, and Kiev with the participation of the Soviet Union best symphony orchestras. She made several concert tours outside of the Soviet Union, where she received praise from critics.

== Success and international recognition ==
Chkonia won competitions, including the Glinka Competition held in Moscow, the Sofia Competition held in Bulgaria, and the Prague Spring held in Czechoslovakia. She also won the Best Actress award at the Madame Butterfly Competition held in Japan. She was the first female singer from the former Soviet state of Georgia to become a vocal competition laureate. She appeared on stages of Bulgaria, Czechoslovakia, Romania and Japan.

Chkonia was invited to official state and private solo concerts, where her audiences included Nikita Khrushchev, Leonid Brezhnev, Josip Broz Tito, Indira Gandhi, François Mitterrand, John F. Kennedy, Fidel Castro, Gustáv Husák, Yuri Gagarin, Todor Zhivkov, Erich Honecker, Nicolae Ceaușescu, János Kádár, Mikhail Gorbachev, and Eduard Shevardnadze. She was also a frequent guest on state television shows such as Blue Light, Morning Post, Music Mail, and others.

Chkonia became a deputy of the Supreme Soviet of the USSR (1979-1984).

Chkonia's name is included in the Great Soviet Encyclopedia.

== Personal life ==
Chkonia married ballet dancer Moris Lekiashvili in 1958, after he was invited to the Georgian National Opera Theater in Tbilisi by choreographer Vakhtang Chabukiani. The couple subsequently moved to Kyiv, where Lekiashvili became a principal soloist at the State Academic Opera and Ballet Theatre of the Ukrainian SSR. Lekiashvili was a regular presence at Chkonia's performances and rehearsals throughout her career. Lekiashvili died in April 2024, less than a month after Chkonia, and was buried beside her at the Makhata Pantheon.

== Later life and death ==
In 1996, Chkonia moved permanently to Madrid, where she lived with her youngest daughter, soprano Eteri Lamoris, and her family. During this period, Lamoris maintained an active international career performing across Europe and the Americas. Chkonia engaged in teaching and occasionally conducted master classes in France and Portugal. With 40 years of experience, she nurtured many singers, including her daughters Eteri Lamoris and Natela Nicoli.

Around 2010, Chkonia returned to Georgia. Her 80th birthday was marked by gala concerts in Kyiv, Ukraine (1 March 2011) and in Batumi, her birthplace (1 September 2011), both produced by Eteri Lamoris.

Chkonia died on 14 March 2024, at the age of 93. The prime minister of Georgia, Irakli Kobakhidze, sent condolences, speaking of her "particularly individual and characteristic performances".

== Awards ==
Chkonia was the first female Georgian singer to achieve laureate status at an international vocal competition, winning prizes at competitions in the Soviet Union, Czechoslovakia, Bulgaria and Japan between 1960 and 1967. Over a professional career spanning more than thirty years as a stage performer at opera houses across the Soviet Union from 1956, and as a recording artist with eleven albums released on the Melodiya label between 1963 and 1984, she became one of the most decorated soprano voices of her generation. In 1976 she received the People's Artist of the USSR, the highest artistic honour in the Soviet Union. Across her career she was recognised by the governments of the Soviet Union, Ukraine and Georgia with state decorations, and by cultural organisations in Germany, Italy and Ukraine.

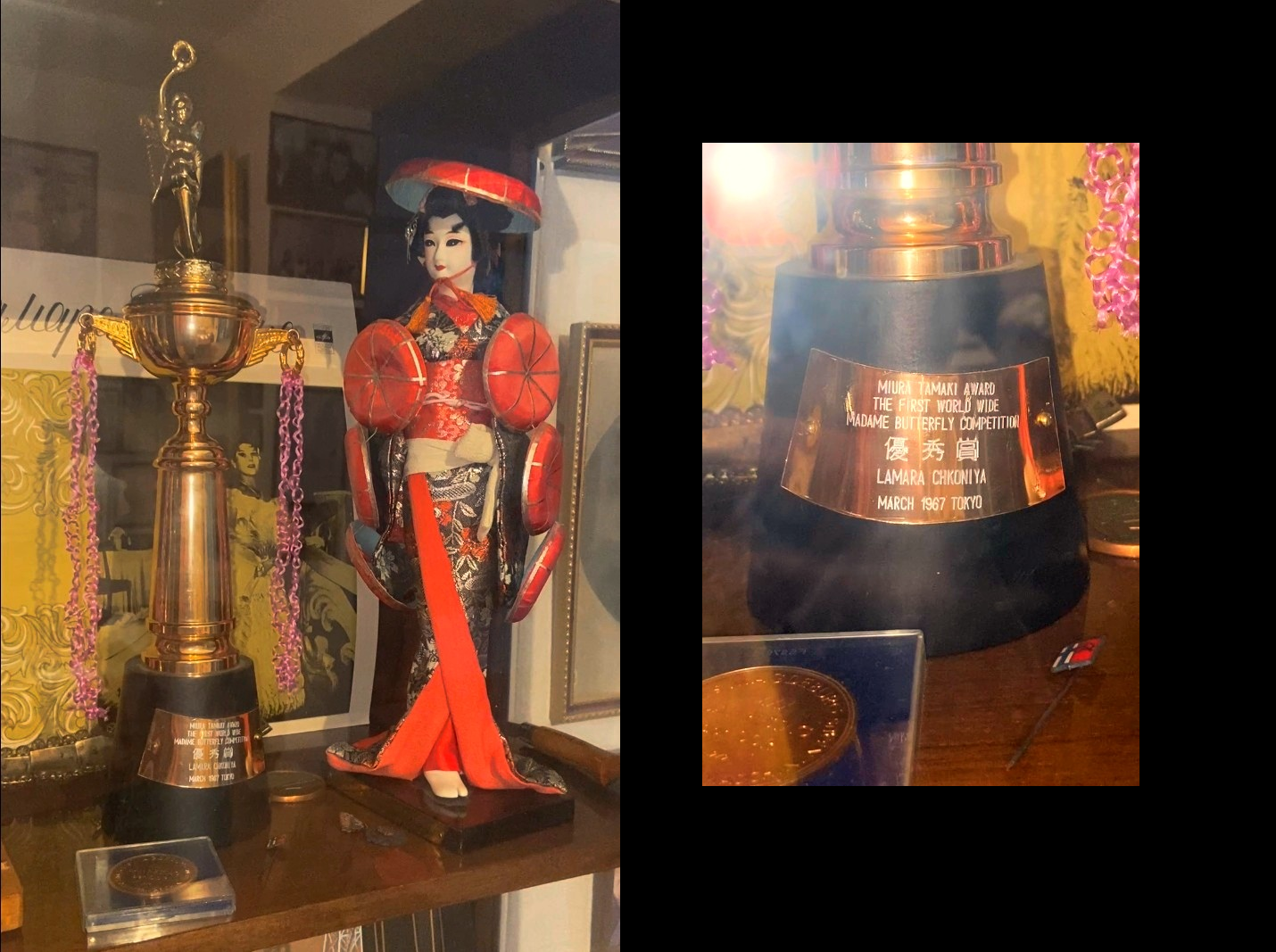
Trophy awarded to soprano Lamara Chkonia at the First Worldwide Madame Butterfly Competition, Tokyo, March 1967

=== State honours ===
- People's Artist of the USSR (1976)
- People's Artist of the Ukrainian SSR
- People's Artist of the Georgian SSR (1970)
- Merited Artist of the Ukrainian SSR (1963)
- Order of the Badge of Honor (Znak Pocheta), USSR (1974)
- Order of Queen Tamara, Republic of Georgia (2011)
- Presidential Order of Excellence, Republic of Georgia (2011)
- Order of the Holy Great Martyr Barbara (UOC-MP), Ukraine (2011)

=== Civic and arts awards ===
- Honorary member, Saarländisches Staatstheater, Saarbrücken, West Germany (8 June 1974)
- Honorary citizen of Batumi, Georgian SSR (9 September 1988)
- Boris Christoff Career Award, Buggiano, Tuscany, Italy (18 September 2010)
- Twelve-Ray Star "Credo", for contribution to the development of society (GRIN organisation), Ukraine (2011)
- Premio Cigno D'Oro, Italy (2011)

=== Competition prizes ===
- Excellence Award (優秀賞, Yūshūshō), Miura Tamaki Prize, First Worldwide Madame Butterfly Competition, Tokyo, Japan (1967)
- Laureate, International Vocal Competition, Prague Spring festival, Czechoslovakia (1960)
- Third Prize Laureate, International Competition for Young Opera Singers, Sofia, Bulgaria (1963)
- Third Prize Laureate, All-Union Glinka Vocal Competition, Moscow, USSR (1960)

From 1987, she served as professor at the Tbilisi State Conservatoire.

== Repertoire ==
=== Opera roles ===
Role	Opera	Composer
Almirena	Rinaldo	Handel
Paris	Paride ed Elena	Gluck
Serpina	La serva padrona	Paisiello
Susanna	The Marriage of Figaro	Mozart
Cherubino	The Marriage of Figaro	Mozart
Pamina	The Magic Flute	Mozart
Lyudmila	Ruslan and Lyudmila	Glinka
Norma	Norma	Bellini
Linda	Linda di Chamounix	Donizetti
Lucia	Lucia di Lammermoor	Donizetti
Rosina	The Barber of Seville	Rossini
Violetta	La traviata	Verdi
Gilda	Rigoletto	Verdi
Elsa	Lohengrin	Wagner
The Page (Urbain)	Les Huguenots	Meyerbeer
Marguerite	Faust	Gounod
Micaela	Carmen	Bizet
Manon	Manon	Massenet
Marfa	The Tsar's Bride	Rimsky-Korsakov
Tatiana	Eugene Onegin	Tchaikovsky
Iolanta	Iolanta	Tchaikovsky
Cio-Cio-San	Madama Butterfly	Puccini
Mimi	La bohème	Puccini
Musetta	La bohème	Puccini
Maro	Daisi	Paliashvili
Eteri	Absalom and Eteri	Paliashvili
Marikh	Absalom and Eteri	Paliashvili

=== Concert and recording repertoire ===
Work	Composer
"Exsultate, jubilate"	Mozart
"Pieta, Signore"	Stradella
"Se tu m'ami"	Pergolesi
Ave Maria	Schubert
Berceuse from Jocelyn	Godard
Serenade from Ruy Blas	Weckerlin
"Le Rossignol et la Rose" (Vocalise)	Saint-Saëns
"La Danza" (Tarantella Napoletana)	Rossini
Solovey (The Nightingale)	Alyabyev
Otvernites ne glyadite (Turn Away, Do Not Look)	Gurilyov
Net, ne lyublyu ya vas (No, I Don't Love You)	Bulakhov
Krasnyi sarafan (The Red Sarafan)	Varlamov
Na zare ty yeyo ne budi (Don't Wake Her at Dawn)	Varlamov
Ne probuzhdai vospominaniy (Do Not Awaken Memories)	Gurilyov
O, ne tseluy menya (Oh, Do Not Kiss Me)	Dyubuk
Chto mne zhit i tuzhit (Why Should I Live and Grieve)	Dyubuk
Domik-kroshechka (Little Tiny House)	Bulakhov
Ptichka (Little Bird)	Gurilyov
Pravo, mamenkye skazhu (I'll Tell Mama)	Varlamov
Grust devushki (Girl's Sadness)	Bulakhov
Ne khochu (I Don't Want)	Dyubuk
Georgian Lullaby	Chimakadze
La Patria (composed for Lamara Chkonia)	Machavariani
Again You (Georgian Ballad)	Kargareteli
Golondrina	Del Aqua
Vals	Arditi
Buy Violets	Vietti
Lullaby	Gershwin
Love Hearts (duet with Natela Nicoli)	Weber
