= Nodar Andguladze =

Georgian operatic tenor (1927–2013)

- ნოდარ ანდღულაძე
- Born: 13 December 1927; Tbilisi, Transcaucasian SFSR, Soviet Union
- Died: 30 January 2013 (aged 85); Tbilisi, Georgia
- Resting place: Didube Pantheon, Tbilisi
- Occupations: Operatic tenor, voice teacher, philologist
- Years active: 1956–1983
- Father: David Andguladze

Nodar Davitis dze Andguladze (Georgian: ნოდარ ანდღულაძე; 13 December 1927 – 30 January 2013) was a Georgian operatic tenor, voice teacher and philologist. A leading soloist of the Tbilisi Opera and Ballet Theatre and a longtime professor at the Tbilisi State Conservatoire, he was named a People's Artist of the Georgian SSR in 1965. He was the son and pupil of the tenor David Andguladze.

== Early life and education ==
Andguladze was born on 13 December 1927 in Tbilisi. He graduated from the Faculty of Philology of Tbilisi State University in 1950 and earned the degree of Candidate of Philological Sciences in 1954 for research on the comparative grammar of the Ibero-Caucasian languages under Arnold Chikobava. He went on to graduate from the Tbilisi State Conservatoire in 1963, studying in the class of his father, David Andguladze, and in 1961–1962 trained at La Scala in Milan.

== Career ==
From 1956 Andguladze was a soloist of the Tbilisi Opera and Ballet Theatre, and from 1953 to 1959 he also lectured on Caucasian languages at Tbilisi State University. A dramatic tenor, his roles included Abesalom and Malkhaz in Paliashvili's Abesalom da Eteri and Daisi; Tariel in Mshvelidze's The Tale of Tariel; Hermann in Tchaikovsky's The Queen of Spades; the title roles in Verdi's Otello and Rigoletto, Radamès in Aida and Manrico in Il trovatore; Edgardo in Donizetti's Lucia di Lammermoor; Canio in Pagliacci; Turiddu in Mascagni's Cavalleria rusticana; the title role in Wagner's Lohengrin; and Herod in Strauss's Salome. He toured widely as both an opera and concert singer, and in 1983 directed a production of Lucia di Lammermoor at the Kutaisi Opera Theatre.

== Teaching and scholarship ==
Andguladze joined the faculty of the Tbilisi State Conservatoire, becoming head of the solo-singing department in 1974 and a professor in 1981. He wrote scholarly studies on the theory, history and methodology of vocal art, including the book Homo cantor (1997). Together with his father, he is remembered as one of the leading Georgian singers of his era.

== Awards and honours ==
- Honoured Artist of the Georgian SSR (1961)
- People's Artist of the Georgian SSR (1965)
- Zacharia Paliashvili Prize (1977)
- Order of Honour (1998)

== Personal life ==
Andguladze was the son of the tenor David Andguladze (1895–1973), a People's Artist of the USSR, who was also his singing teacher. He died in Tbilisi on 30 January 2013 and was buried at the Didube Pantheon.
