= David Andguladze =

Georgian operatic tenor (1895–1973)

- დავით ანდღულაძე
- Born: 15 October 1895; Bakhvi, Kutaisi Governorate, Russian Empire
- Died: 29 November 1973 (aged 78); Tbilisi, Georgian SSR, Soviet Union
- Resting place: Didube Pantheon, Tbilisi
- Occupations: Operatic tenor, voice teacher
- Years active: 1926–1973
- Children: Nodar Andguladze

David Iasonis dze Andguladze (Georgian: დავით ანდღულაძე; 15 October 1895 – 29 November 1973) was a Georgian operatic tenor and voice teacher. A dramatic tenor and a leading soloist of the Tbilisi Opera and Ballet Theatre, he was named a People's Artist of the USSR in 1950 and, as a longtime professor at the Tbilisi State Conservatoire, became a central figure in Georgian vocal pedagogy.

== Early life and education ==
Andguladze was born on 15 October 1895 in the village of Bakhvi, in present-day Ozurgeti Municipality in the Guria region of western Georgia, then part of the Kutaisi Governorate of the Russian Empire. He graduated from the Tbilisi Conservatoire in 1925, studying in the class of Professor Yevgeny Vronsky.

== Career ==
Andguladze made his debut on the stage of the Tbilisi Opera and Ballet Theatre in 1926 as Riccardo in Verdi's Un ballo in maschera; in the same season he sang Canio in Pagliacci, Radamès in Aida and Cavaradossi in Tosca. From 1927 to 1929 he was a soloist of the Stanislavsky Opera Theatre in Moscow, where his roles included Rodolfo in La bohème and Grigory in Mussorgsky's Boris Godunov. Returning to the Tbilisi company from 1929 to 1933, he created vocal-dramatic portrayals of Don José in Carmen and Hermann in Tchaikovsky's The Queen of Spades.

From 1933 to 1935 Andguladze was a soloist of the Bolshoi Theatre in Moscow, where he gave his first performances of Manrico in Verdi's Il trovatore and Raoul in Meyerbeer's Les Huguenots. He then returned to Tbilisi, where his portrayal of Abesalom in Paliashvili's Abesalom da Eteri was highly praised at the first Decade of Georgian Art in Moscow in 1937. Among his other roles were Tariel in Shalva Mshvelidze's The Tale of Tariel, the title role in Verdi's Otello (1949), Malkhaz in Paliashvili's Daisi, and Shota in Arakishvili's The Tale of Shota Rustaveli.

== Teaching ==
From 1946 Andguladze taught at the Tbilisi V. Sarajishvili State Conservatoire, becoming a professor in 1958 and head of the solo-singing department from 1967 until his death. His students included the tenors Zurab Anjaparidze and Zurab Sotkilava, as well as his son Nodar Andguladze.

== Awards and honours ==
- Order of the Red Banner of Labour (1937)
- People's Artist of the Georgian SSR (1941)
- Two Orders of Lenin (1946, 1950)
- Stalin Prize, First Class (1947), for the title role in The Tale of Tariel
- People's Artist of the USSR (1950)
- Zacharia Paliashvili State Prize of the Georgian SSR (1973)

== Personal life ==
Andguladze's son, Nodar Andguladze (1927–2013), was also an operatic tenor and a People's Artist of the Georgian SSR. Andguladze died in Tbilisi on 29 November 1973 and was buried at the Didube Pantheon.
