= Ioseb Kechakmadze =

Georgian composer

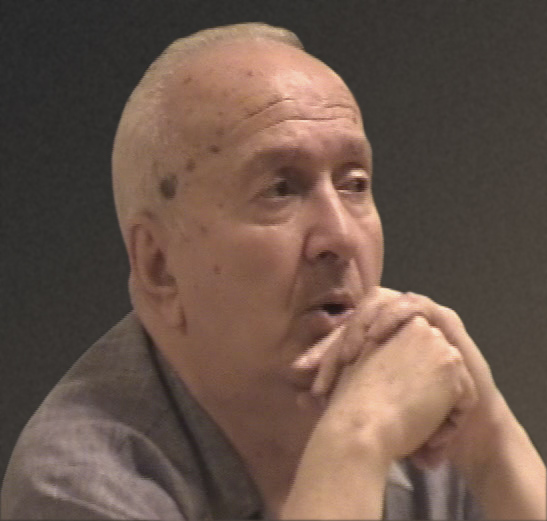
- Born: March 27, 1939; Ozurgeti, Soviet Union
- Died: March 24, 2013 (aged 73); Tbilisi, Georgia
- Occupation: Composer

Ioseb Kechakmadze (Georgian: იოსებ კეჭაყმაძე March 27, 1939 – March 24, 2013) was a Georgian composer.

== Early life and education ==
Kechakmadze was born in Ozurgeti in the family of Ilia Kechakmadze and Elene Oragvelidze. He studied at Batumi Z. Paliashvili Music School from 1955 and then he continued his study at Tbilisi Central Ten Year Music School specializing in choral conducting.

In 1960–1965, Kechakmadze studied at the Faculty of Composition of Tbilisi V.Sarajishvili Conservatoire, where he was supervised by Professor Iona Tuskia, Rector of the Conservatoire, and after his death, by composer David Toradze.

Kechakmadze worked for Tbilisi Teachers' Republic House as a Chorusmeister and Concertmeister, while he studied at Ten Year Music School. During his study period at Tbilisi V. Sarajishvili Conservatoire he worked with Odysseas Dimitriadis at the Faculty of Choral Conducting.

== Career ==
In 1966, Kechakmadze started working for the Presidium of Choreographers Society in different positions. In 1968 he started tutoring activities at Conservatoire, and from 1980–2007 he was the dean of the faculty of Choral Conducting. The degree "professor" was awarded to him in 1984.

From 1972, Kechakmadze was the head of the Department of Musical Institutions of the Ministry of Culture of Georgia, editor-in-chief of repertory – editorial board. He was Z. Paliashvili State Prize Committee's chairman from 1993 and Advisor of the Minister of the Ministry of Culture of Georgia from 2002.

In 2004, Kechakmadze adapted music by Georgian composer Zacharia Paliashvili to form the national anthem of Georgia, "Tavisupleba".

== Personal life ==
Kechakmadze was married to Olga Kobakhidze and they had two sons and one daughter. He died in Tbilisi.

He was buried at Didube Pantheon of prominent artists and public figures of Georgia.

== Works ==
=== A Cappella ===
- Choral cycle "Pshavian Idylls" based on poems by Ana Kalandadze;
- Cycle of choral paraphrases "Old Tbilisi Songs", based on poems by Ietim Gurji, Giorgi Skandarnova and folk poems;
- Choral cycle "Amer – Imeri" based on Georgian folk and mythical poetry;
- Choral cycle "The Soul Darkened" based on poems by Ilia Chavchavadze;
- Choral cycle based on poems by Galaktion Tabidze;
- Choral cycle based on poems by Terenti Graneli;
- Choral cycle "The Rebukes of Life" based on poems by Ioseb Baiashvili;
- Choral Compositions based on folk poems;
- Choral Compositions based on poems by various poets;
- Ecclesiastical Hymns for Women's Chorus, Men's Chorus, and for miscellaneous chorus;

=== Orchestral and vocal – symphonic compositions ===
- Five Music Pieces for Chamber Orchestra, 1965
- Symphonic Music Poem "Tomb of the unknown soldier", 1966
- "Voice of the Nation" Cantata for a tenor, baritone, miscellaneous chorus and symphonic orchestra, 1966
- "Georgian Sky" Ballade for a soloist, chorus and symphonic orchestra, 1970
- "Fathers'Hearth" Ode for a soloist, men's chorus and symphonic orchestra, 1972
- "Ode to Ilia Chavchavadze" for a soloist, chorus and symphonic orchestra, 1977
- "Be Praised You – Strong Nation!" Ode for a soloist, miscellaneous chorus and symphonic orchestra, 1977

=== Music for shows / theatrical plays ===
- "The story of two boys", Batumi I.Chavchavadze Drama Theatre, 1957
- "The Right Hand of the Grand Master", Kutaisi L.Meskhishvili Drama Theatre, 1957
- "Tutarchela", Shota Rustaveli Academic Theatre, 1977
- "King Oidipos", Kote Marjanishvili State Academic Drama Theatre, 1978
- "The Martyrdom of Saint Shushanik", Shota Rustaveli Academic Theatre, 1979
- "What did Iavnana do", Tbilisi Adult Spectators Georgian Theatre, 1980 – 1981
- "The Mountain's height" Tbilisi Sandro Akhmeteli Drama Theatre, 1981
- "Beneath the lake of Bazaleti", Tbilisi Sandro Akhmeteli Drama Theatre, 1986
- "The Priest", The television series, 1990
- "Lamara", Batumi I.Chavchavadze Drama Theatre, 1995

=== Music for movies ===
- "Dog", 1974
- "Matsgi", 1975
- "Bata Kekia", 1978
- "Mountain Short Story", 1979
- "Difficult Beginning", 1981
- "Arsena's Poem", 1985
- "My Gypsies", 1987

== Awards and honours ==
- Z. Paliashvili State Prize, 1976
- Honoured Art Worker of the Georgian SSR (1979)
- People's Artist of the Georgias SSR (1981)
- Prize for "Best Movie Soundtrack of the Year" Musical Play "Arsena's Poem", 1985
- Prize for "Best Music for Dramatic Plays""Lamara" by Grigol Robakidze performed at Batumi I. Chavchavadze Drama Theatre, 1995
- Shota Rustaveli State Prize (for Ecclesiastical Hymns created in 1978 – 1994 for Sioni Cathedral Church), 1995
- Order of Honor, 1996
- State Prize of Georgia, 2004
- The St. George Gold Order of Georgian Orthodox Church, 2009
- In 2013 one of the central streets in Ozurgeti was named after Ioseb Kechakmadze.
