= Maro Makashvili =

Georgian National Heroine (1901–1921)

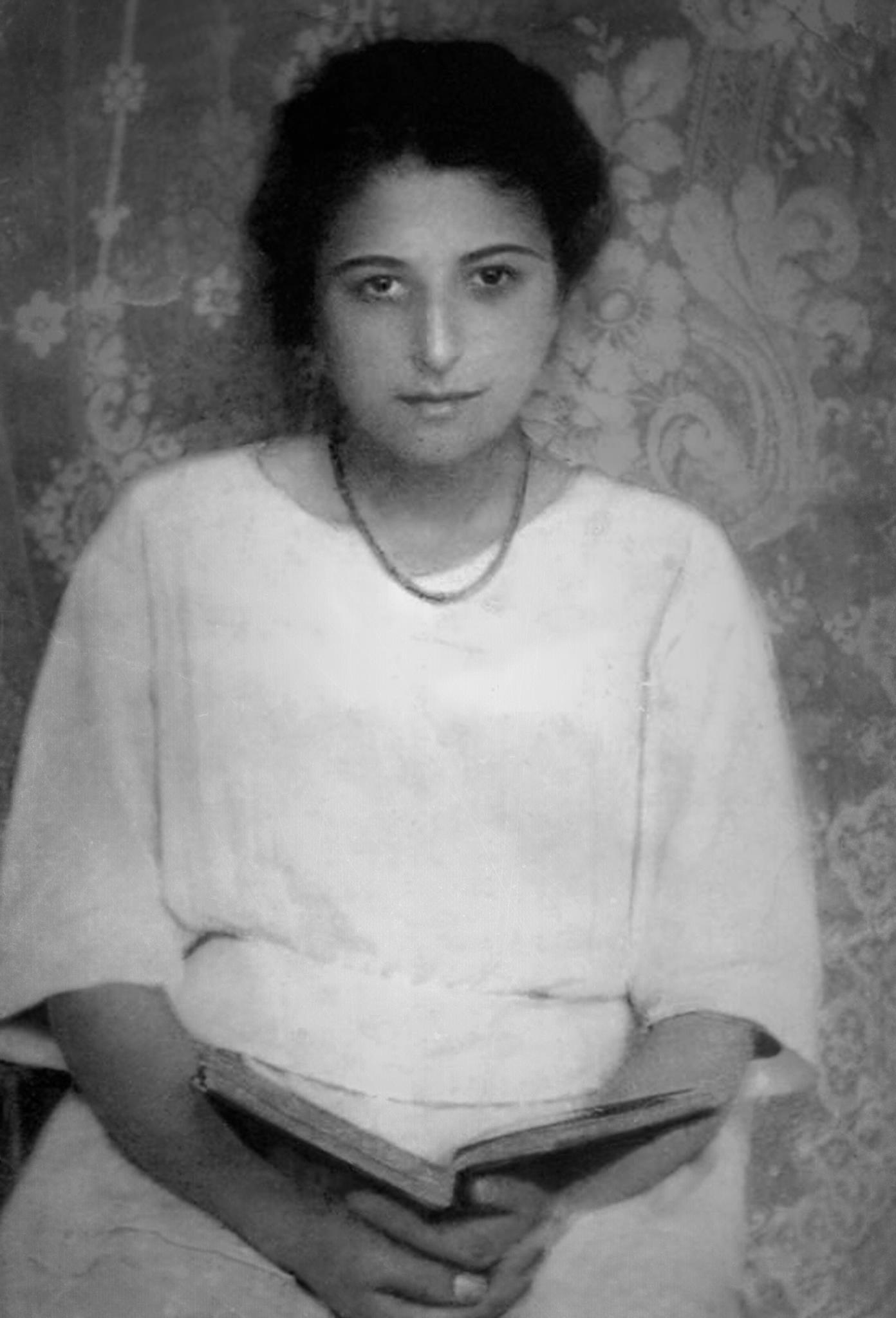
Maro Makashvili

Maro Makashvili (Georgian: მარო მაყაშვილი; 25 August 1901 – 19 February 1921) was a young Georgian woman who was killed during the 1921 Red Army invasion of Georgia. In 2015, she was the first woman to be awarded the Georgian Order of National Hero.

== Biography ==
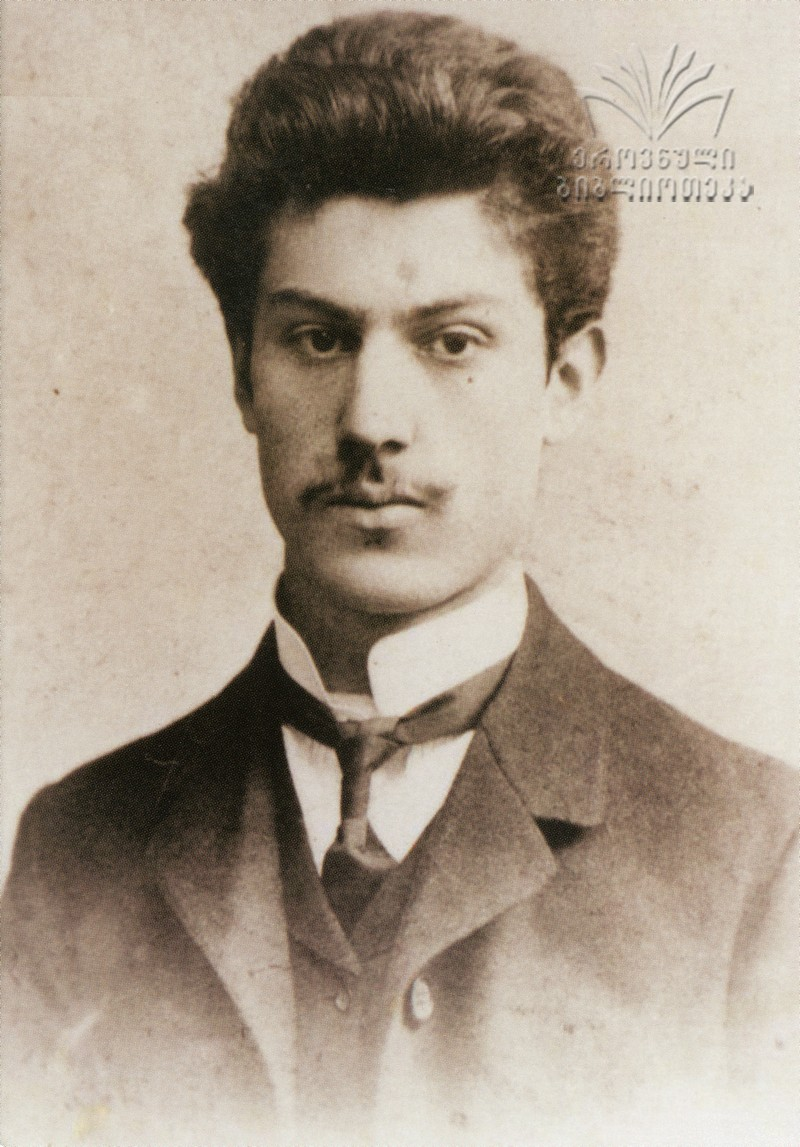
Maro's father, Konstantine Makashvili

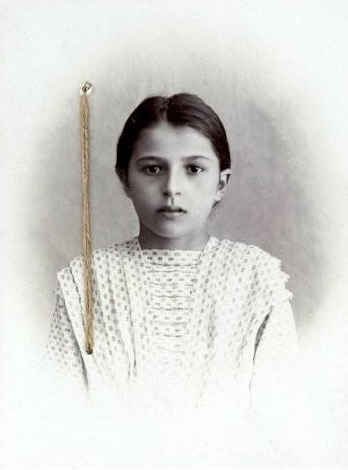
Maro as a young student

Makashvili was born in a family of the Georgian nobility. Her father Konstantine Makashvili was a poet and her maternal grandmother was the writer Ekaterine Gabashvili.

Maro Makashvili was a student at the Tbilisi State University when the Red Army launched its invasion of Georgia in February 1921. She volunteered as a nurse and was sent to Kojori along with the Georgian Regiment. She was killed by splinters from a shell two days later.

Immediately after her death Georgian poet Titsian Tabidze compared her to Joan of Arc in a newspaper article. In her honour, Zakaria Paliashvili used the name Maro for the heroine of his opera Daisi, which premiered in 1923. A park located off Gudiashvili street in Tbilisi is named after her.

From age 16 until her death, Makashvili kept a diary that is now part of the collection of the Tbilisi Museum of Literature. It has been published as a book.

== See also ==
- Jason Kereselidze
- Anna Sologashvili
