= Eteri =

Eteri is a female Georgian name and can refer to:

- Eteri Andjaparidze, Georgian-American pianist
- Eteri Lamoris, Georgian-Spanish singer
- Eteri Liparteliani, Georgian judoka
- Eteri Tutberidze, Russian figure skating coach
