= Valeria Stenkina =

Russian opera singer

Valeria Stenkina Валерия Стенькина
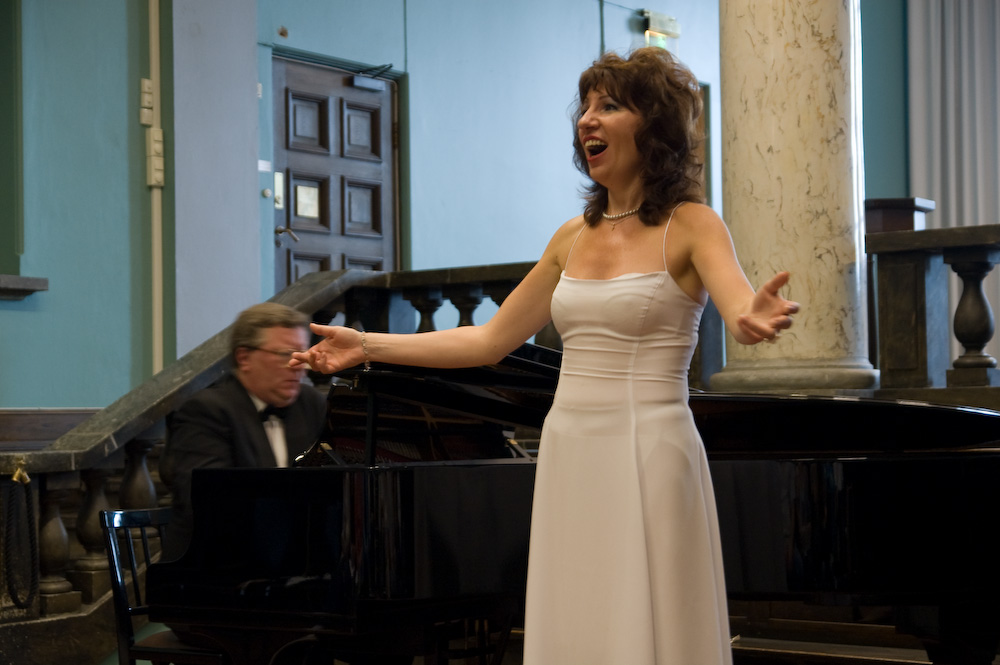
- Valeria Stenkina and Igor Uryash at the 2007 Oslo Griegfestival

Background information
- Born: Samara, Russia
- Occupation: Opera singer (soprano)
- Years active: 1998-present

Valeria Stenkina (Russian: Валерия Стенькина) is a Russian operatic soprano and Meritorious Artist of Russia.

== Biography ==
Stenkina was born in Samara, Russia. In 1992 she graduated from the Saint Petersburg Conservatory and four years later, for the first time, has appeared at the Mariinsky Theatre in the title role of Salome. She became a permanent member of the Mariinsky company and since 1997 has performed such roles as Tatyana in Eugene Onegin, Maria in Mazeppa, as well as Violetta in La traviata and Kundry in Parsifal.

In 1998 performed with the Estonian National Opera where she sang the role of Elizabeth in Don Carlos and the same year performed the title role in Norma with the Lithuanian National Opera. In 1999 she reprised the title role in Tosca in the great hall of the Saint Petersburg Philharmonia and at International Chaliapin Festival in Kazan. In November of the same year she performed in Otello and Il trovatore conducted by Zurab Sotkilava at the Opera House, Riga and in December she performed Richard Strauss's Four Last Songs with the Jerusalem Symphony Orchestra conducted by Uriel Segal.

She has also recorded two CDs, one in 1992 published by Sony Music Entertainment and another in 1994 published by Melodiya.
