= Tavisupleba =

National anthem of Georgia

English: 'Freedom'
- თავისუფლება
- Sheet music
- National anthem of Georgia
- Lyrics: David Magradze
- Music: Zacharia Paliashvili, 1923; Ioseb Kechakmadze, 2004
- Adopted: 20 May 2004; 22 years ago
- Preceded by: "Dideba"

Audio sample
- Official orchestral and choral vocal rendition in B-flat major: file; help

Official orchestral and choral vocal recording in Abkhaz
From the Government of Georgia's Agenda.ge English-language news platform

Official orchestral instrumental recording
Old recording from the website of the President of Georgia

U.S. Navy Band instrumental rendition

"Tavisupleba" (Georgian: თავისუფლება, pronounced [tʰaβisupʰleba]; lit. 'Freedom') is the national anthem of Georgia. It was adopted as the Georgian national anthem in May 2004, along with a new national flag and coat of arms. The symbols' change was brought about upon the successful overthrow of the previous government in the bloodless Rose Revolution. The music, taken from the Georgian operas Abesalom da Eteri ("Abesalom and Eteri") and Daisi ("The Nightfall"), by the Georgian composer Zacharia Paliashvili (Georgian: ზაქარია ფალიაშვილი), was adapted by Ioseb Kechakmadze (Georgian: იოსებ კეჭაყმაძე) to form the anthem. The lyrics were written by David Magradze (Georgian: დავით მაღრაძე).

== History ==
The current Georgian national anthem was adopted by the Parliament of Georgia on 20 May 2004, exactly five months after the resignation of President Eduard Shevardnadze in the Rose Revolution. A bill was introduced in the first plenary meeting of the sixth convocation of the Georgian Parliament on 22 April 2004. The bill to adopt "Tavisupleba" as Georgia's national anthem was presented by the Minister of Culture Giorgi Gabashvili; in which the music was played for the deputies soon afterwards. The law does not give any regulations, but refers to the corresponding Presidential Decree.

"Tavisupleba" succeeded the old national anthem "Dideba", which was in use by the Democratic Republic of Georgia from 1918 to 1921, and again by the newly independent (from the Soviet Union) Georgia from 1990 to 2004.

The new national anthem quickly gained popularity in contrast to its predecessor, whose lyrics were somewhat archaic and difficult to memorize.

During U.S. President George W. Bush's visit to Georgia in May 2005, he along with President Mikheil Saakashvili was addressing tens of thousands of Georgians in Freedom Square, Tbilisi when a recording of "Tavisupleba" failed to play properly. Saakashvili then motioned to the choirs, and thousands in the crowd joined the singers in singing it, a moment which was described by media as "the most powerful moment of the day".

== Music ==
The music of "Tavisupleba" was adapted from two Georgian operas, Abesalom da Eteri (1918) and Daisi (1923), composed by Zacharia Paliashvili, the father of the Georgian classical music genre.

== Lyrics ==
=== Georgian original ===
Georgian script

ჩემი ხატია სამშობლო,
სახატე მთელი ქვეყანა,
განათებული მთა-ბარი,
წილნაყარია ღმერთთანა.

თავისუფლება დღეს ჩვენი
მომავალს უმღერს დიდებას,
ცისკრის ვარსკვლავი ამოდის
ამოდის და ორ ზღვას შუა ბრწყინდება,

და დიდება თავისუფლებას,
თავისუფლებას დიდება!

Latin script

Chemi khat’ia samshoblo,
Sakhat’e mteli kveq’ana,
Ganatebuli mta-bari
Ts’ilnaq’aria Ghmerttana.

Tavisupleba dghes chveni
Momavals umghers didebas,
Tsisk’ris varsk’vlavi amodis
Amodis da or zghvas shua brts’q’indeba,

Da dideba tavisuplebas,
Tavisuplebas dideba!

IPA transcription (Note: See Help:IPA/Georgian and Georgian language § Phonology.)

[tʃʰe̞.mi χä.tʼi.ä säm.ʃo̞.bɫo̞]
[sä.χä.tʼe̞‿m.tʰe̞.li kʰʷe̞.(q)χʼä.nä |]
[ɡ̊ä.nä.tʰe̞.bu.li‿m.tʰä b̥ä.ɾi]
[tsʼiɫ.nä.(q)χ’ä.ɾi.ä‿ʁ.me̞ɾtʰ.tʰä.nä ‖]

[tʰä.βi.su.pʰle̞.bä d̥ʁe̞s tʃʰʷe̞.ni]
[mo̞.mä.βäɫs um.ʁe̞ɾ.z̥‿d̥i.de̞.bäs |]
[tsʰis.k’ɾis βäɾs.kʼʷɫä.βi ä.mo̞.dis]
[ä.mo̞.dis d̥ä o̞ɾ‿z.ʁʷäs ʃu.ä b̥ɾ̩tsʼ.(q)χʼin.de̞.bä |]

[d̥ä d̥i.de̞.bä tʰä.βi.su.pʰle̞.bäs]
[tʰä.βi.su.pʰle̞.bäs d̥i.de̞.bä ‖]

=== Abkhaz version ===
Cyrillic script

Ашәа азаҳҳәоит ҳныха, ҳаԥсадгьыл
Иҳазгәакьоу, иԥшьоу ҳтәыла.
Мрала ирлашоуп ҳа ҳадгьыл,
Уи азоуп изахьӡу амратәыла.

Иахьа иҳамоу ахақәиҭра
Ашәа азаҳҳәоит гәырӷьа бжьыла,
Аеҵәа ҩ-мшынк рыбжьара
Икаԥхоит Анцәа имч ала,

Иныҳәазааит ахақәиҭра,
Ахақәиҭра амч-алша.

Georgian script

აშჿა აზაჰჰჿოიტ ჰნჷხა, ჰაფსადგჲჷლ
იჰაზგჿაკჲოუ, იფშოუ ჰტჿჷლა.
მრალა ირლაშჾოუპ ჰა ჰადგჲჷლ,
უი აზოუპ იზახჲძუ ამრატჿჷლა.

იახჲა იჰამოუ ახაქჿითრა
აშჿა აზაჰჰჿოიტ გჿჷრღჲა ბჟჷლა
აეწჿა ჳ-მშჾჷნკ რჷბჟარა
იკაფხოიტ ანცჿა იმჩ ალა.

ინჷჰჿზააიტ ახაქჿირა,
ახაქჿირა ამჩ-ალშჾ!

Latin script

Ašwa azahhwoiṭ hnyxa, hapsadgjyl
Ihazgwaḳjou, ipšjou hṭwyla.
Mrala irlašouṗ ha hadgjyl,
Ui azouṗ izaxjdzu amraṭwyla.

Iaxja ihamou axakwitra
Ašwa azahhwoiṭ gwyrġja bzjyla,
Aeċwa ẇ-mšynḳ rybzjara
Iḳapxoiṭ Ancwa imč ala,

Inyhwazaaiṭ axakwitra,
Axakwitra amč-alša.

=== English translation ===
My icon is the homeland
It draws the entire country,
It lights up the plains and mountains,
It is shared with God.

Freedom is ours today.
Sing glory to the future,
The morning star rises.
It rises and shines between two seas.

And glory to freedom,
Glory to freedom!

== Regulations ==
According to the Regulations for the Parliament of Georgia, Chapter 3, Article 4.5., the national anthem of Georgia is played at the opening and closing of each session. It is also performed following the signing of the Oath of the Parliamentarian after the Parliament recognizes the authority of at least two-thirds of its newly elected members (Chapter 25, Article 124.7). The anthem is also played prior to the annual report of the President of Georgia to the Parliament.

Georgian Public Broadcaster airs a music video version of the anthem, featuring opera singer Paata Burchuladze.
