= Zurab Sotkilava =

Georgian operatic tenor (1937–2017)

- ზურაბ სოტკილავა
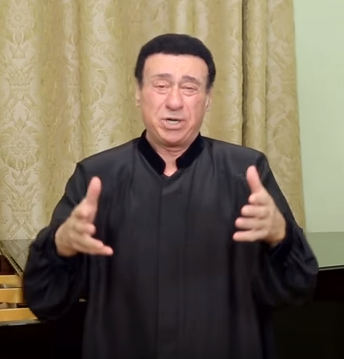
- Born: Zurab Lavrentyevich Sotkilava; 12 March 1937; Sukhumi, Georgian SSR, Soviet Union
- Died: 18 September 2017 (aged 80); Moscow, Russia
- Occupations: Tenor opera singer (1965–2017); Football player (1955–1959)
Association football career
- Full name: Zurab Lavrentyevich Sotkilava
- Position: Defender
Youth career
- 1951–1955: Dinamo Sokhumi
Senior career*
Years	Team	Apps	(Gls)
1955	Dinamo Tbilisi	2	(0)
1956	FShM Tbilisi		
1958–1959	Dinamo Tbilisi	1	(0)
- * Club domestic league appearances and goals

Zurab Lavrentyevich Sotkilava (Russian: Зураб Лаврентьевич Соткилава, Georgian: ზურაბ სოტკილავა; 12 March 1937 – 18 September 2017) was a Soviet and Georgian operatic tenor. Since the early 1970s, he lived and worked in Moscow. He was named a People's Artist of the USSR in 1979.

== Biography ==
=== Education ===
In 1960, Sotkilava graduated from the Tbilisi State Polytechnical Institute.

=== Football career ===
Sotkilava began playing association football during childhood. At age 16, he joined Dinamo Sokhumi where he played full-back. In 1956 he became captain of the Georgia national team, and two years later he joined Dinamo Tbilisi. In 1958 he incurred severe injuries while playing in Yugoslavia. This ultimately led to the end of his sports career in Czechoslovakia the following year.

=== Music career ===
In 1965 he graduated from the Tbilisi Conservatory under the guidance of David Andguladze. Between 1965 and 1974 Sotkilava was a soloist of the Tbilisi Opera and Ballet Theatre (named after Zacharia Paliashvili). From 1966 to 1968 he was a student at La Scala where his teacher was Dinaro Barra. He later became a teacher at the Moscow Conservatory where he remained until 1988. After six years he became chairman of the International Tchaikovsky Competition and was a member of the Bologna Academy of Music, at which point he became known for his singing of Giuseppe Verdi's works.

By 2000, he chaired the jury at the Kinoshock film festival at Anapa, which hosted films from throughout the CIS and Baltic States.

== Later life and death ==
In 2015, he was diagnosed with a malignant pancreatic tumor; he died in 2017, at age 80, and was survived by his wife, Eliso Turmanidze, and his two daughters.

== Roles at the Bolshoi Theatre ==
- Il trovatore — Manrico
- Tosca – Cavaradossi
- Iolanta – Vaudemont
- Aida – Radames
- Sadko – Indian merchant
- The Abduction of the Moon – Arzakan
- Un ballo in maschera – Riccardo
- Cavalleria rusticana – Turiddu
- La molinara — Don Caloandro
- Boris Godunov – The pretender
- Khovanshchina – Galitzine
- Nabucco – Ismaele

== Awards and honours ==
- 2nd prize International Tchaikovsky Competition (1970)
- Honored Artist of the Georgian SSR (1970)
- People's Artist of the Georgian SSR (1973)
- People's Artist of the USSR (1979)
- Shota Rustaveli Prize (1993)
- Order "For Merit to the Fatherland", 2nd class (2017)
- Order "For Merit to the Fatherland", 3rd class (2007)
- Order "For Merit to the Fatherland", 4th class (2001)
- Order of the Badge of Honour (1971)
- Order of the Red Banner of Labour (1976)
- Three Orders of Honor (Georgia) (1997, 2007, 2016)
- Ovation (2008)
- Russian Federation Presidential Certificate of Honour (2012)
- Honorary Member of the Academy of Music Bologna (Italy) - elected "for a brilliant interpretation of the works of Verdi"
- Academician of the Academy of aesthetics and Liberal Arts (Moscow)

== Former students ==
- Ksenia Leonidova
