= David Magradze =

Georgian poet and politician

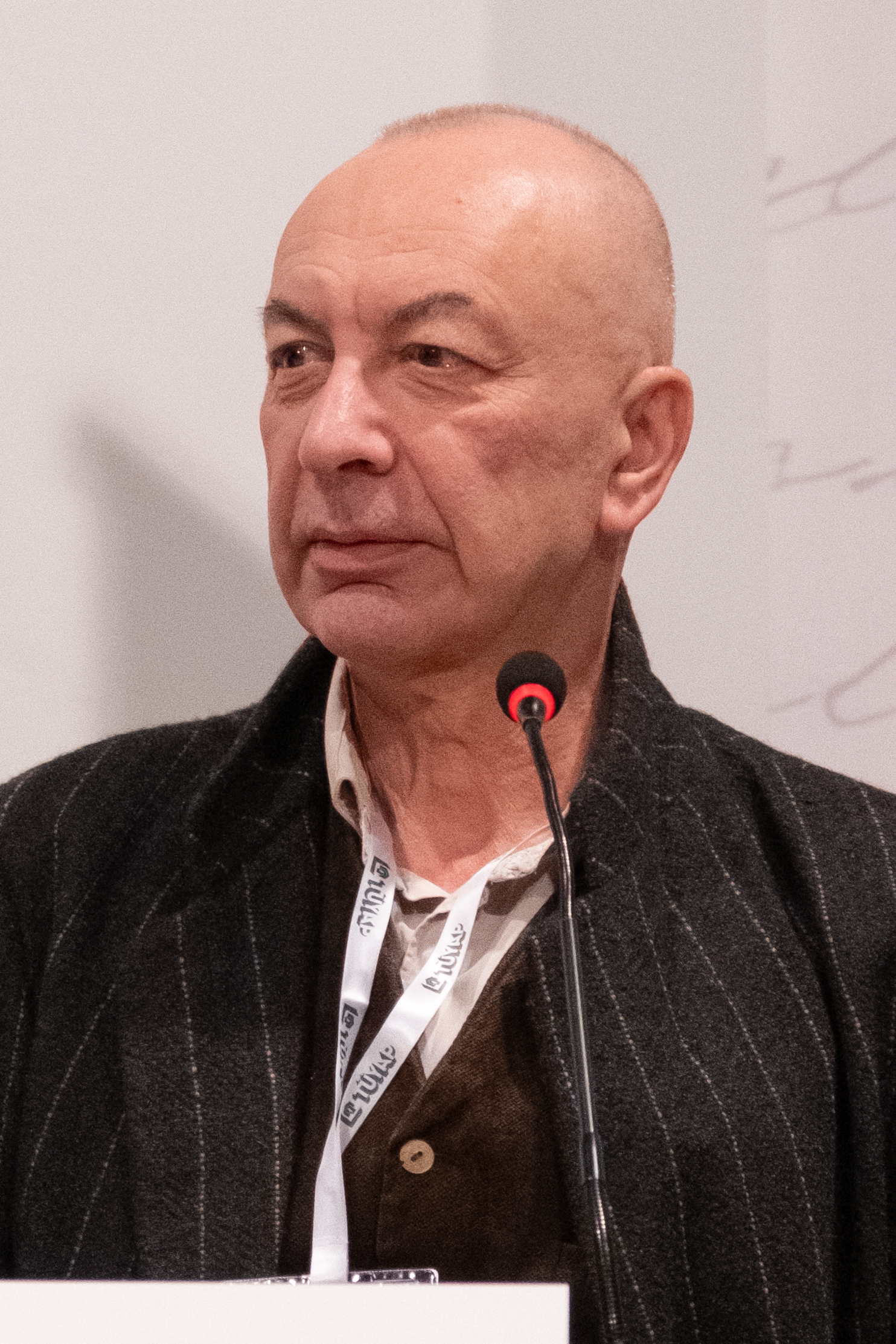
- Magradze at 42nd Istanbul Book Fair, 2025
- Born: 28 June 1962 (age 63); Tbilisi, Georgian SSR, Soviet Union
- Citizenship: Soviet, Georgian

David "Dato" Magradze (Georgian: დავით "დათო" მაღრაძე; born 28 June 1962) is a Georgian poet and politician. He is the author of the lyrics of the current national anthem of Georgia, in use since 2004.

Born to the family of the writer and literary scholar Elguja Magradze in Tbilisi, Magradze is a philologist by education trained at the Tbilisi State University. He first became prominent in the 1980s and edited the leading Georgian literary journal Tsiskari for several years. Under Eduard Shevardnadze, he served as Minister of Culture of Georgia from 1992 to 1995 and was elected to the Parliament of Georgia from 1999 until he resigned his position in the legislature in 2001. Magradze withdrew into opposition to Shevardnadze and supported the 2003 Rose Revolution which forced him to resign. By 2009, he had joined the opposition to President Mikheil Saakashvili and featured prominently in April 2009 rallies demanding Saakashvili's resignation.

Since 1997 to 2010, Magradze is the President of the Georgian PEN club. He has been awarded several Georgian and international literary prizes and the Georgian Order of Honor. His poems have been translated into English by the Poetry Translation Centre, German, Italian, Russian, and Armenian languages.

in April 2019 he founded the political movement "Defend Georgia" along with Vato Shakarishvili and Gia Gachechiladze
