= Eteriani =

Medieval Georgian folk romance

Eteriani (Georgian: ეთერიანი, lit. '[the tale] of Eteri') is a Georgian folk epic romance which survives in the form of about 70 pieces of oral prose and poetry, probably dating from the 10th or 11th century. Variants also exist in the sister languages: Mingrelian, Laz, and Svan.

Eteriani is a love story of a Cinderella-like peasant girl, Eteri, and Prince Abesalom who decides to marry her against the will of his father, a king. Abesalom's courtier Murman also falls passionately in love with Eteri and sells his soul to the devil to make the marriage impossible. Through sorcery, he makes Eteri ill and persuades the prince into surrendering the girl to him as Murman possesses the only remedy for her illness. Abesalom does not survive the breakup and dies, prompting Eteri to commit suicide. The two are buried together, but Murman buries himself alive among them. Even after death, he becomes an obstacle for a reunion of the lovers: a hedge grows on his tomb, interfering between a rose and a violet which grow on the tombs of Abesalom and Eteri and lean to each other into an embrace.

A purely folklore version of the epos, a tale, was first published in the Georgian press in 1858. A more complete publication by the Georgian folklorist Petre Umikashvili followed in 1875. The romance inspired the Georgian writer Vazha-Pshavela (1861–1915) to write his poem Eteri, and composer Zakaria Paliashvili (1871–1933) to create his classical opera Abesalom and Eteri.
