= Dideba =

Former national anthem of Georgia (1918–1921; 1990–2004)

English: Glory
- დიდება
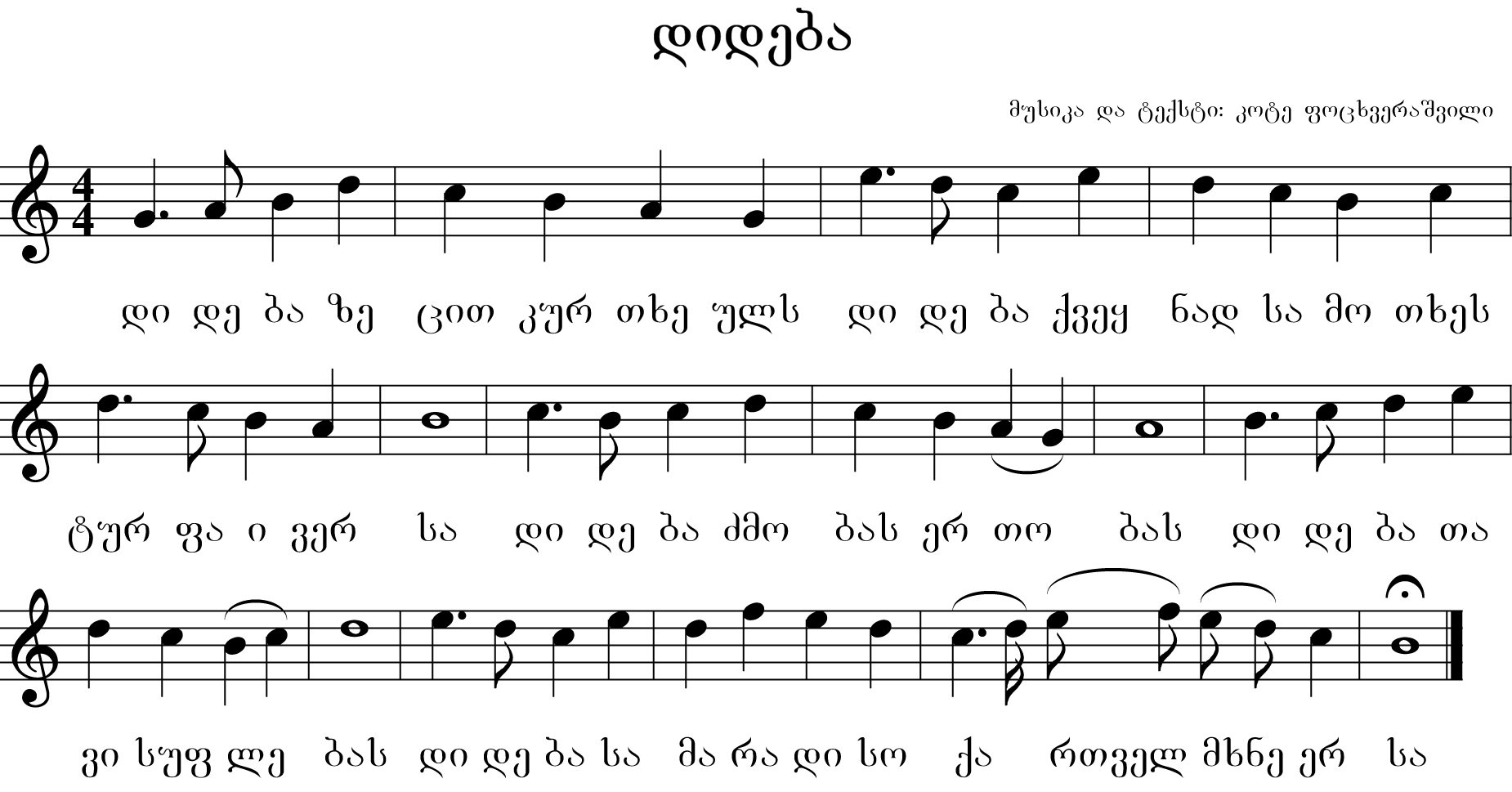
- Sheet music of "Dideba"
- Former national anthem of Georgia Former anthem of the Georgian SSR
- Lyrics: Kote Potskhverashvili
- Music: Kote Potskhverashvili
- Adopted: 1918 (DR Georgia)
- Readopted: November 1990 (Georgian SSR); 1991 (Georgia)
- Relinquished: 1921 (DR Georgia); 1991 (Georgian SSR); 20 May 2004 (Georgia)
- Succeeded by: "Tavisupleba"

Audio sample
- Instrumental rendition in A-flat major: file; help

"Dideba" (/dɪˈdɛbə/ did-EB-ə; Georgian: დიდება 'Glory') was the national anthem of Georgia from November 1990 to May 2004. It was previously the national anthem of Georgia from 1918 to 1921.

== History ==
1993 Georgian performance

1999 Georgian performance

=== Background ===
"Dideba" was written and composed by Kote Potskhverashvili and was adopted by the "Menshevik"-led Georgian government as the country's national anthem in 1918 after it became free from Russian rule. However, "Dideba" was only be used for a few years, until Georgia came under Soviet rule from 1922 onward.

=== Readoption ===
Following the collapse of the Soviet Union in 1991, "Dideba" was readopted as the Georgian national anthem, though at the time of its re-adoption it was barely known by most Georgians as it had been almost seven decades since it was last used as the country's national anthem.

=== Replacement ===
"Dideba" was used as the Georgian national anthem from November 1990 until 20 May 2004, when it was replaced by the current Georgian national anthem "Tavisupleba" following the 2003 Rose Revolution. Though the replacement of "Dideba" came after a change in government, efforts to replace the song reportedly predated said reforms.

== Lyrics ==
=== Georgian original ===
Georgian script

დიდება ზეცით კურთხეულს,
დიდება ქვეყნად სამოთხეს,
ტურფა ივერსა,
დიდება ძმობას, ერთობას,
დიდება თავისუფლებას,
დიდება სამარადისო
ქართველ მხნე ერსა!
დიდება ჩვენსა სამშობლოს,
დიდება ჩვენი სიცოცხლის
მიზანს დიადსა;
ვაშა ტრფობასა, სიყვარულს,
ვაშა შვებასა, სიხარულს,
სალამი ჭეშმარიტების
შუქ-განთიადსა!

Latin script

Dideba zecit k’urtkheuls
Dideba kvekh’nad samotkhes,
T’urpa Iversa.
Dideba dzmobas, ertobas,
Dideba tavisuplebas,
Dideba samaradiso
Kartvel mkhne ersa!
Dideba chvensa samshoblos,
Dideba chveni sicockhlis
Mizans diadsa;
Vasha t’rpobasa, sikh’varuls
Vasha shvebasa, sikharuls,
Salami ch’eshmarit’ebis,
Shuk-gantiadsa!

IPA transcription (Note: See Help:IPA/Georgian and Georgian phonology.)

[d̥i.de̞.bä ze̞.tsʰitʰ kʼuɾ.tʰχe̞.uɫs]
[d̥i.de̞.bä kʰʷe̞.(q)χʼnätʰ sä.mo̞.tʰχe̞s]
[tʼuɾ.pʰä i.βe̞ɾ.sä]
[d̥i.de̞.bä dzmo̞.bäs e̞ɾ.tʰo̞.bäs]
[d̥i.de̞.bä tʰä.βi.su.pʰle̞.bäs]
[d̥i.de̞.bä sä.mä.ɾä.di.so̞]
[kʰäɾ.tʰʷe̞l‿m.χne̞‿e̞ɾ.sä]
[d̥i.de̞.bä tʃʰʷe̞n.sä säm.ʃo̞.bɫo̞s]
[d̥i.de̞.bä tʃʰʷe̞.ni si.tsʰo̞.tsʰχlis]
[mi.zän.z̥‿d̥i.ätʰ.sä]
[βä.ʃä tʼɾ̩pʰo̞.bä.sä si.(q)χʼʷä.ɾuɫs]
[βä.ʃä ʃʷe̞.bä.sä si.χä.ɾuɫs]
[sä.ɫä.mi tʃʼe̞.ʃmä.ɾi.tʼe̞.bis]
[ʃukʰ g̊än.tʰi.ätʰ.sä ‖]

=== English translation ===
Glory to the blessed one in heaven,
Glory to heaven on earth
To the radiant Iberia,
Glory to fraternity and unity,
Glory to liberty,
Glory to the eternal,
Brave Georgian nation!
Glory to our homeland,
Glory to our life
and brilliant purpose;
Hail, O joy and love,
Hail the helpfulness and happiness,
Greetings to the truth,
The light of dawn!
