= Eteri Lamoris =

Spanish opera singer

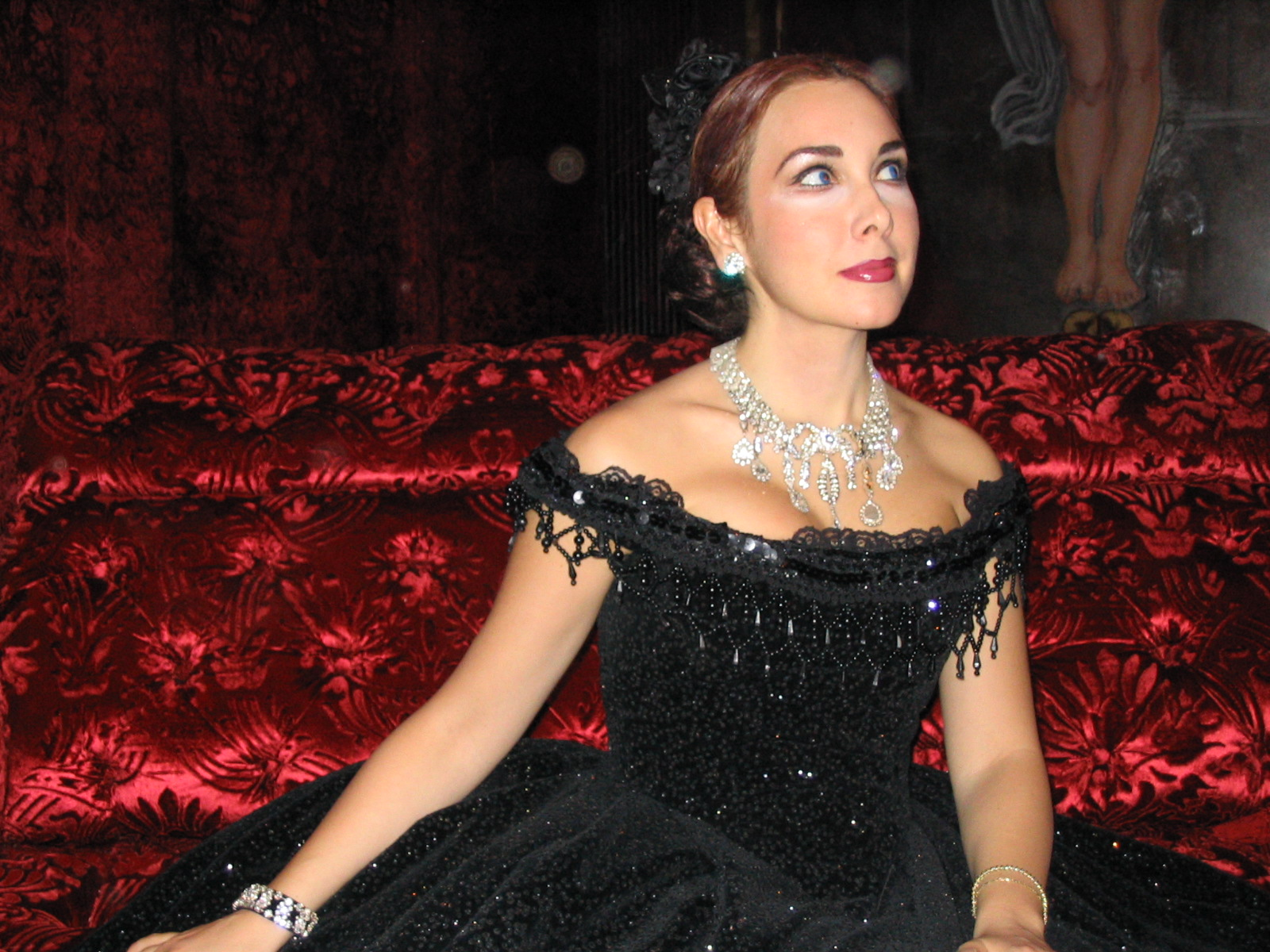
- Lamoris as Violetta (La Traviata)
- Born: 23 May 1971 (age 55); Kyiv, Ukraine
- Citizenship: Spain; Georgia
- Occupations: Opera singer, music event producer, and manager of Belcanto Academy of Graz, Austria
- Years active: 1994–present
- Children: 2
- Awards: Royal Golden Award of the Stockholm Culture Prizes
- Website: www.eterilamoris.net

Eteri Lamoris (born 23 May 1971) is an operatic soprano and voice teacher of Georgian descent. She initially studied with her mother Lamara Chkonia in Tbilisi and later in Madrid. Lamoris made her operatic debut as Desdemona in Otello at the Tbilisi Opera and Ballet Theatre where she later sang roles including Violetta in La traviata and Gilda in Rigoletto. She made her international debut as Musetta in Franco Zeffirelli's production of La bohème at La Scala . She went on to perform leading roles in both European and North American opera houses.

In 2012 she received the Stockholm Culture Awards for Cultural Personality of the Year. The event was at the "Royal Palace". Princess of Sweden Christina Magnuson presented her gold medal with the title the “Greatest Singer of Our Time" and an official certificate.

The international press has bestowed upon her the title of "The Violetta of the 21st century" for her exceptional portrayals in the opera La Traviata and has hailed her as "one of the finest interpreters of Lucia di Lammermoor.

Lamoris has also gained recognition for her role as co-director of the international summer festival "Accademia Belcanto" in Graz, Austria, alongside her sister, Natela Nicoli.

Eteri Lamoris is a laureate in nine International competitions, in five of which she was awarded the first prize.

== Career ==
Eteri Lamoris studied singing under the guidance of her mother, the renowned soprano Lamara Chkonia. Later, she attended the High School of Singing of Madrid, studying with Dolores Ripolles, a student of Elvira de Hidalgo. She further honed her vocal skills in Vienna, receiving training from Renata Scotto and Ruthilda Boesch.

Her debut occurred at the Georgian National Opera Theater, where she performed roles like Desdemona (Verdi - Otello) and Violetta (Verdi - La Traviata).

Lamoris achieved recognition in 1994 performing at Operalia, World Opera Competition in 1994 hosted by Placido Domingo and Diana Ross. She received the "Audience Prize" in the semi-final of this contest at Vienna State Opera (Wiener Staatsoper). She has been awarded prizes in nine international singing competitions, winning first place in five.

She appeared at the Bonn Opera House in Germany under the artistic direction of Giancarlo Del Monaco as Juliette (Roméo et Juliette), and at the Washington Opera as Elvira (I Puritani) and Nedda (I Pagliacci) in the production at Teatro Alla Scala Di Milano with Plácido Domingo and Bruno Pola.

In the Stadttheater Bern and Deutsche Oper am Rhein Düsseldorf, she performed as Lucia Di Lammermoor under the direction of Christof Loy. At the Arriaga Opera House of Bilbao, she appeared in operas such as La Traviata (Violetta), Carmen, Orfeo ed Euridice, and L'Elixir D'Amore with Marco Armiliato, Manca di Nissa, Vicente Sardinero, Denis Graves, and Luis Lima.

Additional performances took place at Teatro La Fenice di Venezia in Un Ballo in Maschera with Giorgio Zancanaro; the Haydn-Festival in Eisenstadt, at Staatsoper Hannover performing L'Incontro Improvviso (Rezia) under the musical direction of Adam Fisher and La bohème at the Royal Theatre of Madrid with Silvio Varviso.

She also performed in Palm Beach Opera's production of Rigoletto, at the Mannheim National Theatre in La Traviata (Violetta), and at the Teatro Nacional de Río de Janeiro in the same opera, staged by Sonia Frisell and Giani Quaranta. She appeared at the Teatro de Santoro de Brasilia in Alzira, Colón Theatre of Buenos Aires and Teatro Comunale Giuseppe Verdi in Les Contes d'Hoffmann (Antonia) under the musical direction of Daniel Oren. The Opéra de Nice featured her in La Bohème (Musetta).

In the realm of recitals, Eteri Lamoris has performed Verdi's trio of "Ernani" from the Gala-concert in Barcelona at the Royal Palace Music Festival in Stockholm, and the Christmas in Vienna Gala Concert. She has also sung in numerous concerts with the Moscow Soloists Orchestra under the baton of Yuri Bashmet.

She has appeared in several concerts at the Auditorio Nacional in Madrid, the Bolshoi Theatre in Moscow, the Liceu Theatre in Barcelona, and the Campoamor Theatre in Oviedo. Teatro Regio di Parma featured her in a concert with the Praga Virtuosos Orchestra.

Noteworthy performances include her appearances at the Teatro dell'Opera di Roma in the opera I Capuleti e I Montecchi with Nello Santi.

== Personal life ==
Eteri has two children, Ana and Alex. Due to the birth of her second child, she has reduced her operatic activity, returning in 2010 to the field of recital and the production of musical events. Her projects such as "La Scala Stars", "Pearls of the World of Opera", "Spanish Nights", and "Lamara Chkonia-80" can be found on her website.
