= Natela Nicoli =

Georgian opera singer (born 1961)

Natela Nicoli-Metzger (Note: Georgian: ნათელა ჭყონია-ნიკოლი, romanized: Natela Ch’q’onia-Nik’oli) (born 19 April 1961, known by the diminutive Nato) (Note: Georgian: ნატო, romanized: Nat’o) is a Georgian opera singer. She sings in Georgian, Russian, German, Italian, French, English, and Spanish among other languages.

== Biography ==
Natela Nicoli was born in Tbilisi and is the daughter of Lamara Chkonia.

Natela Nicoli ist Präsidentin und Künstlerische Leiterin der Accademia Belcanto Festivals.(Austria): www.accademia-belcanto.com www.natela-nicoli.com
