= Madama Butterfly International Concours in Nagasaki =

"Madama Butterfly International Concours in Nagasaki" is a singing competition for Soprano, Mezzo-soprano, Tenor, and Baritone held in Nagasaki-city, Japan.

The Hosts: Nagasaki City Government: Nagasaki International Tourism & Convention Association: The Working Committee Office of "Madama Butterfly International Concours in Nagasaki"

Celebrating 100 years since the first performance in Milan, Italy, "Madama Butterfly International Concours in Nagasaki" (Biennale) started where the original story of "Madama Butterfly" was written as its background.

Soprano is required of “Un bel dì, vedremo” from Madama Butterfly. Tenor is required of “Addio, fiorito asil” from it.

- First stage: CD or MD (Mini Disc) screening
- Second and Final stages: Live in Nagasaki, Japan

== History ==
- In 2004, the first competition, 45 singers participated from 4 countries in Second Stage in Nagasaki.
- In 2006, the second competition, 39 singers participated from 6 countries in Second Stage in Nagasaki.
- In 2008, the third competition, 44 singers participated from 6 countries in Second Stage in Nagasaki.
- In 2011, the fourth competition, 49 singers participated from 7 countries in Second Stage in Nagasaki.

=== 2016 Competition ===
- The Application Process for 2016 competition: May 16 2016. All applications must arrive or be made by this date
- Eligible birth dates are on or after November 25 1976, and on or before November 24 1998.
- Deadline for applications: May 16 2016.

== Winners ==
Top

- 2004 Megumi Norimatu, Soprano (Japan)
- 2006 LuWa Ke, Soprano (China)
- 2008 Kim Jeong-Kyu, Tenor (Korea)
- 2011 Yu Liu, Tenor (China)

Second

- 2004 Zhou Jin Hua, Tenor (China)
- 2006 Hwang Byong-nam, Tenor (Korea)
- 2008 Naoyuki Okada, Tenor (Japan)
- 2011 Huanhuan Ma, Soprano (China)

Third

- 2004 Zheng Tian Qin, Soprano (China)
- 2006 Joung Sung-mi, Soprano (Korea)
- 2008 Kai Wang, Tenor (China)
- 2011 Gukhoe Song, Baritone (Korea)

== See also ==
- List of classical music competitions
