= Valerian Gunia =

Valerian "Valiko" Gunia
- ვალერიან "ვალიკო" გუნია
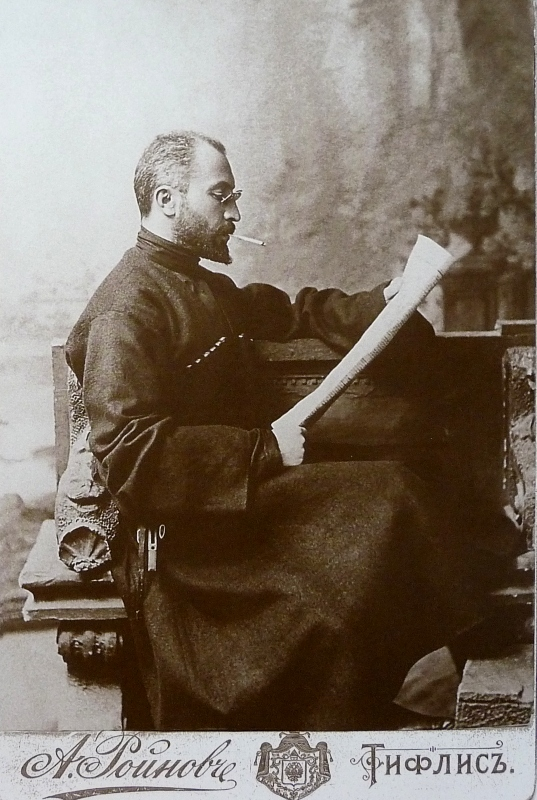
- Valerian Gunia. A photo by Alexander Roinashvili (1865-1898)
- Born: January 21, 1862; Village of Eki, Kutais Governorate, Russian Empire
- Died: July 31, 1938 (aged 76); Tbilisi
- Occupations: Dramatist, actor, director, critic, translator

Valerian "Valiko" Gunia (Georgian: ვალერიან [ვალიკო] გუნია; 21 January 1862 – 31 July 1938) was a Georgian dramatist, actor, director, critic, and translator. His contribution to the Georgian scene won him the title of People's Artist in 1934.

Born in the village of Eki, Kutais Governorate, Russian Empire, in what is now the Senaki Municipality of a family of untitled Mingrelian nobility, Gunia attended the realschule in Tiflis until being expelled for participation in student protests in 1881. He then studied at the Petrovsko-Razumovsky Agricultural Academy in Moscow.

In 1882 he joined the Georgian Dramatical Troupe in Tiflis. As an actor, he played leading roles in major European plays. He also trained many talented actors, and organized seasonal and travelling companies. He was a strong proponent of realistic theatre and his plays found notable place in the repertory of the Georgian theatre. He also translated several plays by the Russian and Western European authors and wrote a history of the Georgian theatre.

Beginning in 1913, Gunia also appeared in several Georgian films.

He died in Tbilisi and was interred at the Didube Pantheon.
