= Daisi =

Opera by Zacharia Paliashvili

- Opera by Zacharia Paliashvili
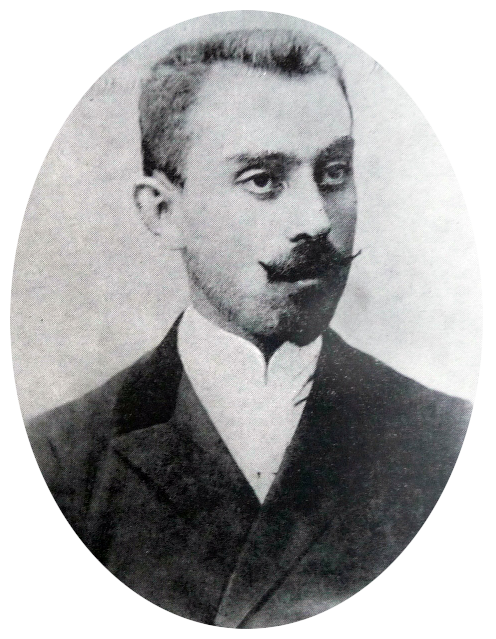
- Zacharia Paliashvili
- Native title: დაისი
- Librettist: Valerian Gunia
- Language: Georgian
- Premiere: 19 December 1923; Tbilisi Academic Opera and Ballet Theatre, Tbilisi

Daisi (Georgian: დაისი) is an opera in three acts by the Georgian composer Zacharia Paliashvili to a Georgian libretto by Valerian Gunia. It was first performed at the Tbilisi Opera and Ballet Theatre on 19 December 1923. To celebrate the 100th anniversary of its composition, the opera was staged at the Georgian National Opera Theater and in Catania in an Italian translation.

== Composition history ==
The idea for Daisi was given to Zakaria Paliashvili by the famous Georgian playwright and actor Valerian Gunia, who later created the opera's plot and libretto. Gunia drew inspiration from poems by Shota Rustaveli, Akaki Tsereteli, Vazha-Pshavela, and Nikoloz Baratashvili. The protagonist of Daisi is named after Maro Makashvili, a Sister of Mercy who was killed in the defensive battle during the annexation of Georgia by Bolshevik Russia in February 1921.

Composing the opera commenced in 1921, and it was largely written in Abastumani over the course of three summers.

Zakaria Paliashvili introduced Vano Sarajishvili and Sandro Inashvili to the parts of Malkhazi and Chiazo and shared some of his friends’ professional remarks. There is an opinion that Malkhazi's aria "Tavo Chemo", which ends the first act of the opera, was included in the score of Daisi by Paliashvili at the insistence of Vano Sarajishvili.

Paliashvili completed the opera on August 9, 1923, in Abastumani. On December 19 of the same year, this second remarkable creation by Zakaria Paliashvili made its debut on the stage of the Tbilisi Opera Theater.

The premiere of the opera took place on December 19, 1923, in Tbilisi. The opera was staged by Kote Marjanishvili, with Konstantine Andronikashvili serving as his right-hand man. The artistic design was handled by Valerian Sidamon-Eristavi. M. Diskovski, assisted by Iliko Sukhishvili, choreographed the ballet numbers.

The legendary singer Vano Sarajishvili, who played the role of Malkhazi, significantly contributed to the successful premiere of Daisi. Since its very first performance, Zakaria Paliashvili's opera has established a permanent place in the repertoire of the Tbilisi Opera and Ballet Theater.

== Roles ==
Roles, voice types, premiere cast
Role	Voice type	Premiere cast, 19 December 1923 Conductor: Ivane Paliashvili
Malkhaz	tenor	Vano Sarajishvili
Maro	soprano	E. Popova
Kiazo	baritone	I. Krijanovski
Nano, friend of Maro	mezzo-soprano	B. Neiman
Tito, a young peasant	tenor	G. Tumanishvili
Tsangala, an Old peasant	bass	L.Isetski

== Synopsis ==
Time: the early 20th century.
Place: a Georgian village.

=== Act 1 ===
As the evening draws near, a picturesque Georgian village is abuzz with excitement, preparing for the church holiday—Khatoba. Nano, brimming with anticipation, eagerly awaits the festivities to commence. However, her friend, a 19 year old Maro, burdened by sorrow, finds herself in a state of melancholy. Her lover, Malkhaz, has been away for an extended period, leaving her in a state of longing. To add to her distress, she has been betrothed to Commander Kiazo against her will, a union that deeply unsettles her spiritual convictions. Nano, her best friend, tries to cheer her up, but neither her attempts nor the approaching feast of Khatoba are able to make her any happier.

Amidst the preparations, Nano shares the news of Malkhaz's imminent arrival, accompanied by his enchanting voice. As they meet, Malkhaz is met with a shocking revelation—Maro's impending marriage to Commander Chiazo. The festivities unfold, bringing joy and merriment to the villagers. Nano and Tito compete by improvising funny and witty verses, as do Tito and Tsangala later. Tito wins the competition, which makes Tsangala angry and they start a fight. Tito is backed by the people and has just joined Malkhaz. In an attempt to defuse the tension, Nano initiates a round dance. Angry, Tsangala suspects Nano's intention: she organised the dance to bring Maro and Malkhaz closer together. Tsangala vows vengeance and threatens to reveal their secret to Captain Kiazo. To avoid the piper's intrusive presence, Nano politely declines his advances.

The sound of bells reverberates through the air as people begin to make their way towards the church. Amidst this gathering, Malkhaz seeks solace with Maro, but Maro manages to escape his grasp, leaving Malkhaz consumed by grief.

=== Act 2 ===
The feast continues. Tsangala fulfills his threat, discreetly reassuring Kiazo that his fiancée, Maro, still loves Malkhaz. Kiazo is devastated. He composes a table song to conceal his rage from everyone. Unaware, Maro dreams of Malkhaz; at the same time, he senses that something terrible is approaching. Malkhaz appears and speaks to her again of his love, but Maro is sure that their happiness is impossible. Nano interrupts, warning of Kiazo's arrival. The girls plead Malkhaz to go. In the crowd Kiazo seeks his rival, who is also ready to fight. Suddenly, news arrives that the enemy has invaded the country. Kiazo calls for the protection of the homeland.

=== Act 3 ===
Kiazo finds a frightened Maro standing on the church wall and accuses her of betraying him. Maro confesses that she was never in love with him and throws her wedding ring back at him. Malkhaz tries to remind Kiazo of his duties. But the desire for revenge is stronger than patriotism. Kiazo fatally stabs Malkhaz. People rush in from all sides. Kiazo has a sense of guilt about his crime, especially when the homeland is in the throes of disaster. It promises to pay for the sin with its own blood. Malkhaz dies. Maro mourns him. The people share her grief.The feast is over. The warriors leave to protect the country. The sun rises.
