= Abesalom da Eteri =

1919 opera by Zacharia Paliashvili

- Opera by Zacharia Paliashvili
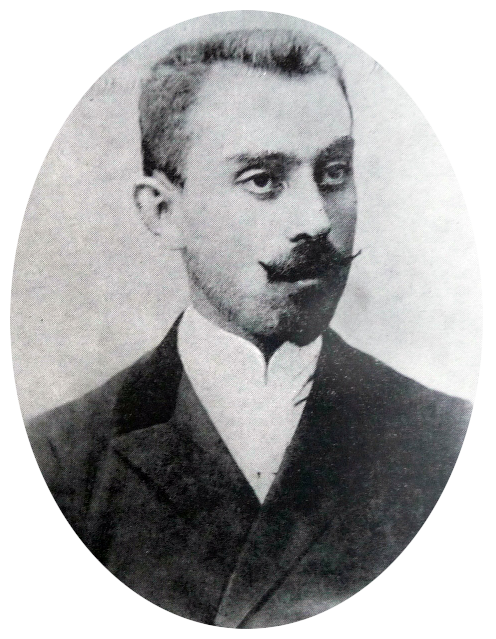
- Native title: აბესალომ და ეთერი (Abesalom da Eteri)
- Librettist: Petre Mirianashvili^{d}
- Language: Georgian
- Based on: Eteriani, Georgian folk epic romance
- Premiere: 21 February 1919; Georgian National Opera Theater, Tbilisi

Abesalom da Eteri (Georgian: აბესალომ და ეთერი; lit. 'Absalom and Ether') is an opera by the Georgian composer Zacharia Paliashvili and librettist Petre Mirianashvili based on a medieval Georgian folk poem Eteriani. Composed between 1909 and 1918, the work was partly staged in 1913 and first premiered in its present-day form on 21 February 1919 at the Georgian National Opera Theater in Tbilisi. The opera is an eclectic fusion of folk songs and traditional 19th-century Romantic classical themes. In 2004, several excerpts from this opera were adapted as the National Anthem of Georgia.

== Background and historical context ==
When opera was first introduced in present-day Georgia during the 1840s, the performances were held in Italian and other Western European languages traditionally dominating the operatic art. At the time, as part of his conciliatory reforms, Russian Viceroy Mikhail Vorontsov went on to patronize Georgian-language theater performances in the newly established Tiflis Imperial Theater. This was not without controversy, as not all Russians were enthusiastic about Georgian contributions to the city's cultural development; some objected to Georgian-language works and had them moved to different days, rather than preceding regular opera performances as it was done up to that point.

First native forms of the Georgian-language opera began to develop in the late 19th century, with the emergence of artists like Meliton Balanchivadze, whose 1897 work Tamar the Wily, later known as Darejan the Wily, was perhaps the earliest Georgian opera. This was followed by a more fully developed opera in several acts, Christine, composed by Revaz Dimitris dze Gogniashvili/Prince Gogniev (1893 – 1967). These early works were limited to a relatively niche audience and did not gain much popular acclaim in Georgia. Paliashvili's Abesalom da Eteri was in comparison a high point of the Georgian operatic movement in the waning years of the Russian Empire. It was the first Georgian-language opera to garner widespread recognition in the Georgian and later Soviet artistic society. As a testament to this status, for the past several decades Abesalom da Eteri has traditionally been the opening performance of the season at the Georgian National Opera Theater.

== Synopsis ==
=== Act 1 ===
A peasant girl Eteri, having run away from an evil stepmother, sits and cries alone in the woods. She hears a singing of hunters from afar - Prince Abesalom and his courtier Murman are hunting along with their retinue. Eteri follows the sound of singing and runs into Murman. Startled by the sudden encounter, she runs the other way but is intercepted by Abesalom. Bewitched by Eteri's beauty, the prince pledges his love to her. Murman himself is enamored with the peasant girl, but he is merely a courtier and does not dare to express his feelings. Privately, Murman is overcome by an evil desire to take Eter away from Abesalom.

=== Act 2 ===
The wedding of Abesalom and Eteri is being held the palace. King Abio blesses the engaged, who take the oath of loyalty. As a wedding gift, Murman presents Eteri with a small box containing an enchanted necklace. The necklace is to afflict Eteri with an incurable illness, from which only Murman can save here. Eteri starts to feel unwell but King Abio tries to keep the guests entertained and asks Marekh to sing. The wedding proceeds with dancing and singing.

=== Act 3 ===
Great misfortune befalls upon the palace – Eteri is overcome by an incurable illness. Abesalom falls into desperation and the entire place mourns the developments. The Queen advises her son to let Eteri go, suggesting that perhaps mountains and sun with bring her back to health. Abesalom is forced to give in and let Eteri go. Murman has achieved his goal – he takes Eteri to himself.

=== Act 4 ===
In Murman's tower Eteri comes back to health. Murman's mother and sisters cherish her in every way. When Abesalom hears of this, he starts to long for Eteri even more. The prince becomes unable to cope with his separation from Eteri and becomes weakened as a result of his suffering. Trumpets sound – Abesalom is finally visiting Murman's tower to see Eteri. To get rid of Murman, Abesalom sends him off to find the elixir of life with the pretext that perhaps that will bring his strength back. Murman reluctantly agrees. Queen Natella implores Eteri to meet Abesalom, hoping that she will make him feel better, but Eteri is refusing – she is angry that her love had given her up and sent her away. Marekh finally convinces Eteri to meet Abesalom, but the weakened prince dies in Eteri's arms. Struck by grief, Eteri kills herself with the same knife, which the prince had once given her as a sign of their love.
