= Zacharia Paliashvili =

Georgian composer (1871–1933)

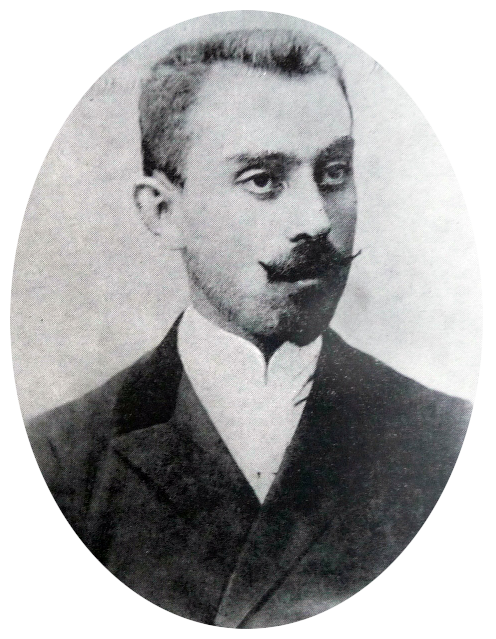
- Born: Zacharia Petres dze Paliashvili; August 16, 1871; Kutaisi, Kutais Governorate, Russian Empire
- Died: October 6, 1933 (aged 62); Tiflis, Georgian SSR, Soviet Union (now Tbilisi, Georgia)
- Spouse: Julia Mikhailovna Utkina

Zacharia Petres dze Paliashvili (Georgian: ზაქარია ფალიაშვილი), also known by his Russian name Zachary Petrovich Paliashvili (Russian: Захарий Петрович Палиашвили; 3 August 1871 – 6 October 1933), was a Georgian composer. Regarded as one of the founders of Georgian classical music, his work is known for its eclectic fusion of folk songs and stories with 19th-century Romantic classical themes. He was the founder of the Georgian Philharmonic Society and later, the head of the Tbilisi State Conservatoire. The Georgian National Opera and Ballet Theater of Tbilisi was named in his honor in 1937. Notably, Paliashvili's music serves as the basis of the National Anthem of Georgia.

Although Paliashvili has composed works for symphony orchestra (e.g., Georgian Suite on Folk Themes), he is probably best known for his vocal music, which includes operas Abesalom da Eteri (based on a folk tale "Eteriani"), Daisi (Twilight), and Latavra.

== Biography ==
=== Family and youth ===
Paliashvili was born on 16 August 1871 in Kutaisi in the family of Petre Ivanes dze Paliashvili (1838–1913), an elder at the Kutaisi Georgian Catholic Church, who was said to be a model father and husband. Zacharia's mother was Maria Pavles asuli Mesarkishvili (1851–1916). Zacharia was the third child in a family of eighteen children (thirteen sons and five daughters). Seven children died in infancy. Although Zacharia's parents were not professional musicians, their children remembered their mother's singing.

In his autobiographical notes Zacharia Paliashvili writes: "...in our big family, my beloved brothers and sisters displayed a natural gift of music even in their early age. To my mind the explanation of this should be sought in the fact that we, being catholics attended the church where the sweet sounds of organ music are not only enjoyable but help develop a good ear... we spend much time in the church and gradually developed a good ear.."

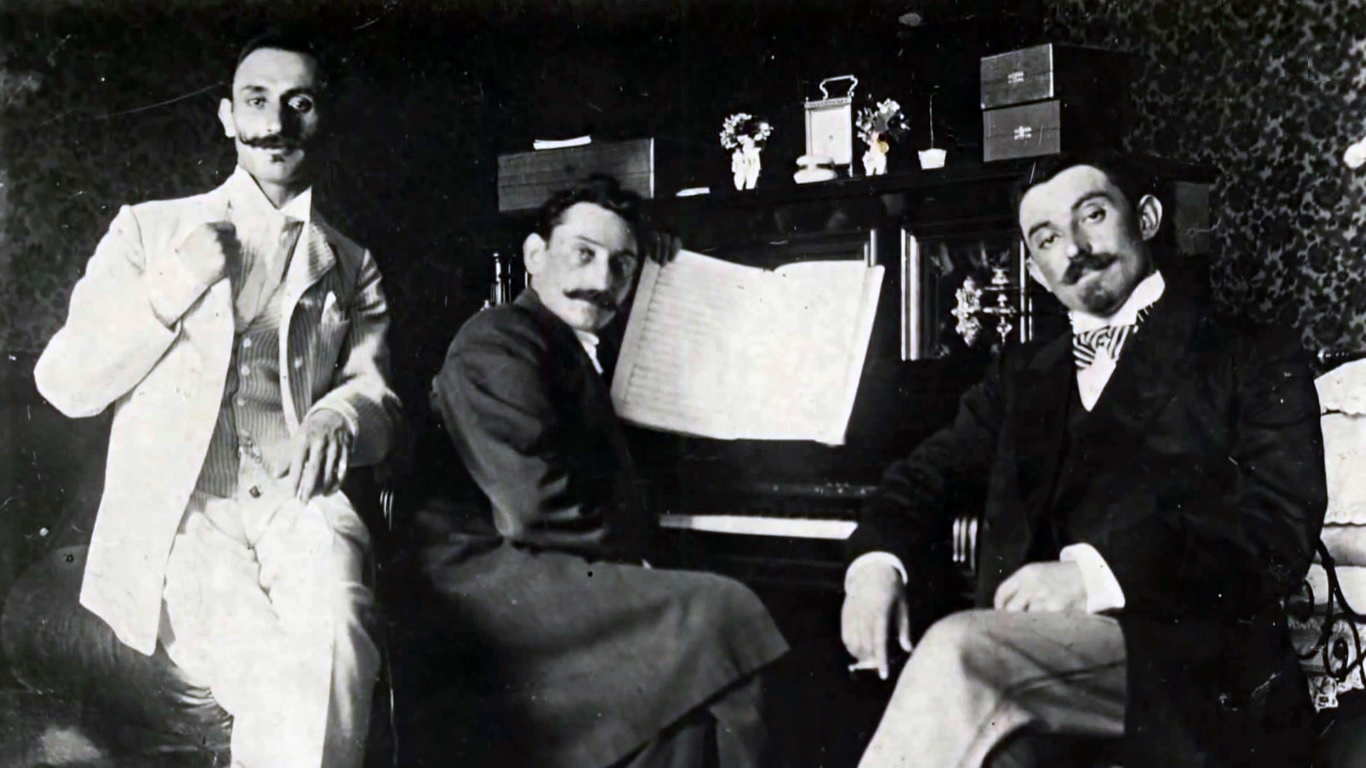
Zacharia (far right) with his brothers Ivane (center) and Polycarp (far left)

The first to display considerable musical abilities was the eldest son Ivane (Vano) Paliashvili (1868–1934) who subsequently became an outstanding conductor. When Vano was eleven years old he was made assistant to the church organist, and the eight-year-old Zacharia was admitted as a chorister to the church choir. With the help of the dean, Father I. Antonishvili, little Zacharia studied "Lullaby for Jesus" and sang it with great success on Christmas night.

The Kutaisi period, however, left a deep impression on the life of the future composer. It was the place of his first contact with music, and the basis of his professional attitude to his life's dedication – music – had developed there, too. All his life Zacharia had retained his youthful love for the relics of Georgia's magnificence, the ruins of the Church of Bagrat (built by Georgia's King Bagrat III in 1003, ruined and plundered by the Turks in 1631), Gelati (1106–1125), one of the most important centres of education, philosophy and literature in medieval Georgia and the extraordinary beauty of his home town. Subsequently, Paliashvili recalled Kutaisi many times, permeated, he said, with a "truly Georgian spirit".

Upon leaving the two-year parish school, brothers Ivan and Zacharia began to play the piano under tutorship of Felix Mizandari, an organist and pianist. Mizandari did not charge the family for the lessons for he was aware that Paliashvili family was of very modest means. Shortly afterwards, people in the town learned of the two talented and exceptionally persevering young musicians.

The news reached father Alfonso Khitarishvili, dean of Tbilisi's Georgian Catholic Church of the Assumption. With the parents' consent Khitarishvili took Ivan and Zacharia Paliashvili to Tbilisi. This was in the spring of 1887. The elder brother was appointed to the post of the organist and Zacharia was made his brother's assistant and a choirboy. A short time after, the entire family of Petre Paliashvili moved to Tbilisi.

=== Move to Tiflis and period in Moscow ===
The work at the Catholic Church in Tbilisi, besides providing a small but badly needed salary also gave Zacharia Paliashvili the opportunity to broaden his musical knowledge by getting acquainted with the composers of Palestrina, Lassus, Bach, Handel, Mozart and other great composers of the past.

The first performance of a Georgian Ethnographic choir, established of the initiative and with the material support of Lado Agniashvili, a well-known public personality, took place in Tbilisi in 1886.

Later the concerts of this choir were conducted by Joseph Ratil (Navratil), who though Czech by birth had forever associated his life with Georgia. The concerts of Agniashvili's choir evoked favourable comments from the patriotically minded Georgian public. Vano and Paliashvili sang in this choir in 1887–1889 and this fact was of importance for the future composer.

In 1889 Vano left for Russia where he was engaged as an opera conductor. His post of church organist was taken over by Zacharia who now had to support the entire family; as a result, he had no opportunity to continue his musical education.

in 1874 on the initiative of singer Kharlamphy Savaneli, pianists Aloizy Mizandari and Konstantin Alikhanov, the first musical school in Georgia was founded in Tbilisi. The Tbilisi Musical School was reorganised into the Tbilisi Branch of the Russian Royal Musical Society with the statue of a musical college. This was carried out with the active assistance of Mikhail Mikhailovich Ippolitov-Ivanov, a well-known Russian composer, conductor and educationalist who worked in Tbilisi in (1882–1893).

Paliashvili's cherished dream came true only in 1891 when he was admitted to the french horn class under F.F. Parizek. A year later, when Parizek left the school, Paliashvili continued to study under A.I. Mosko. He graduated from the French horn class in 1895 and in the same year was admitted to the musical theory class which was conducted by Nikolai Klenovsky, a Russian conductor, composer and teacher. Paliashvili also studied with Ippolitov-Ivanov and music critic Vasili Davidovich Korganov. While studying in Klenovsky's class, Paliashvili wrote several pieces and this aroused in him a desire for further composition.

Paliashvili graduated from the school with honours in the spring of 1899. During his school years he had founded a mixed choir of factory and office workers who performed Georgian and Russian folk songs for workers. In 1898 Paliashvili conducted his choir in Gyandja and had tremendous success.

Following an exchange of letters with Sergei Ivanovich Taneyev (1856–1915), a Russian composer and teacher, Paliashvili went to Moscow towards the end of August 1900. After taking his entry examinations he became a pupil in the class of counterpoint at the Moscow Conservatory. Three years of study with Professor Taneyev, an expert in polyphony, enriched Paliashvili with fundamental knowledge and facilitated his maturing into a professional composer.

=== Return to Georgia ===
Towards the end of June 1903 Paliashvili completed his studies under Taneyev. With his young wife Julia Mikhailovna Utkina, he returned to Georgia to put into practice the knowledge he had gained in Russia. In autumn of 1903, Paliashvili began teaching at the Tbilisi High School for the nobility, where he had a singing class and also conducted the choir and orchestra, founded by him. Paliashvili was a strict and uncompromising teacher. He demanded full accuracy of intonation and precision of rhythm for every pupil-member of his choir or orchestra. He made such big progress in this field, that the school choir and orchestra soon began giving public concerts. The press called this "a triumph of the gifted maestro" and said, that the "choir and orchestra were brought to an evinous standard even for a musical school". A number of personalities who later on distinguished themselves in the Georgian Soviet musical culture (Composers: I. Tuskia, G Kiladze, S. Taktakishvili, V. Gokiely, A. Andriashvili; music critics: S. Aslanishvili, G. Chkhikvadze; Violinist L. Yashvili and others) had their first inspiring contact with music in this school, attending Z. Paliashvili's class. Violinist Andrei Karashvili and composer Zacharia Chkhikvadze worked at the same high school, where they conducted musical classes.

In 1904 Paliashvili was invited to head the teaching of theoretical subjects at the Tbilisi Musical College. Besides instructing classes in solfeggio, harmony and orchestration, he conducted the pupils' choir and orchestra, the public performances of which were invariably successful. In 1906, using a piano piece by A. Karashvili ("Sazandary") as a point of departure, Paliashvili composed a profoundly patriotic song, "Samshoblo", which became popular throughout Georgia.

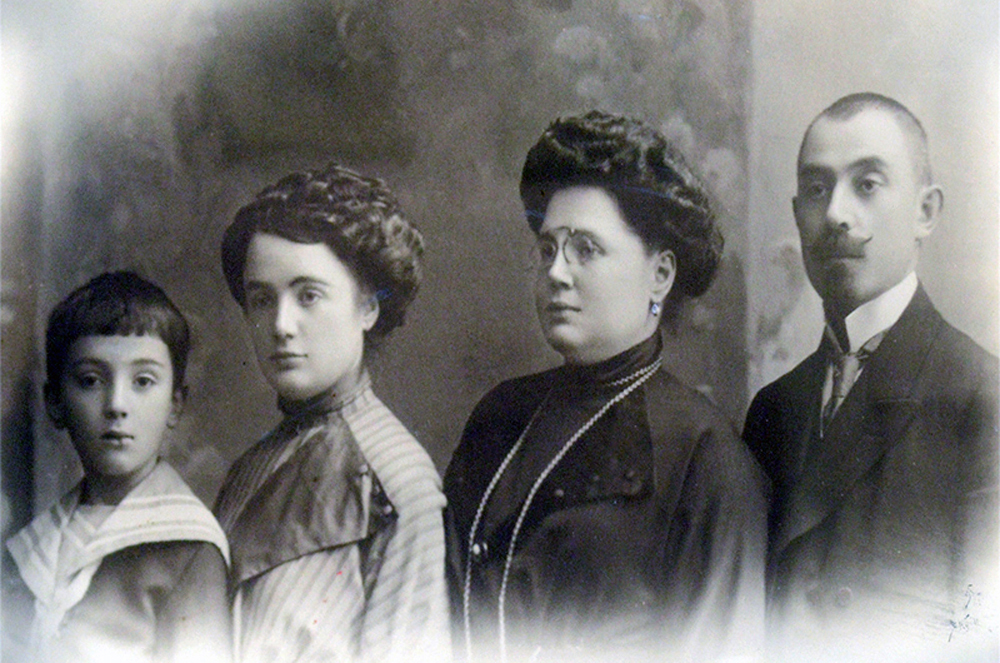
Paliashvili with his wife and children, c. early 1900s

Progressive Georgians before the revolution had regarded collecting, recording and elaboration of folklore material as an essential element, contributing to the spiritual life of the nation. Apart from the practical application – the use of folklore material as the basis of literary fand musical work – a large scale propaganda of remarkable folk poetry and songs formed a major instrument for stimulating the Georgian people's patriotic sentiments. Many contemporaries of Paliashvili were engaged in folklorist work, including Meliton Balanchivadze (father of well-known Soviet composer Andria Balanchivadze and of George Balanchine, an American choreographer), Dimitri Arakishvili, Filimon Koridze, Zacharia Chkhikvadze, Kote Potskhverashvili.

In the summer of 1903, Paliashvili and A.S. Khakhashvili (Khakhanov), professor at the University of Moscow and specialist in the history of Georgian literature, made a tour of Svanetia (a high-altitude area in western Georgia), where they recorded some rare old Georgian folk songs. Paliashvili described the trip to his favourite teacher, S.I. Taneyev. In 1903–1908 with the same goal in view Paliashvili toured such districts as Racha, where he recorded local folk singers, and in particular a mestvire (Bag-piper); Guria (Ozurgeti), Imereti, Kartli and Kakheti. Some of the songs recorded by Paliashvili were published in Moscow as a collection in 1910, financed by the Georgian Philharmonic Society. These are Forty Georgian Folk Songs recorded by Z. Paliashvili and Eight Folk songs rendered for choir and orchestra. Paliashvili, however, did not rest content. Whenever he had the least opportunity, he included folk songs elaborated by him in the concert programme of his choirs. Kliment Kvitka, Ukrainian musicologist and ethnographer, and the husband of Lesya Ukrainka, a distinguished Ukrainian poet, sang in one of these choirs. Paliashvili was a good friend of this talented daughter of the Ukrainian people and of her husband till Lesya Ukraininka's death.

In 1908, on his initiative, a music school was opened under the Philharmonic Society. As the Society was short of funds, Paliashvili headed the school for several years without receiving any payment. Theoretical subjects were taught by Giorgi Natadze, one of Paliashvili's closest friends and a graduate of Moscow Conservatorie. Ilya (Ia) Kargareteli, a prominent musician, singer and composer, initiated an association of staging operas in Georgian, which soon began to work under the patronage of the Georgian Philharmonic Society. The efforts of Kargareteli, Paliashvili and Niko Kartvelishvili led to the first ever Georgian-language performances of Gounod's Faust, Anton Rubinstein's Demon, Rossini's The Barber of Seville, Verdi's Aida and Bizet's Carmen in the Tbilisi opera house. The conductors were Z. Paliashvili and N. Kartvelishvili.

In May 1917, the Tbilisi Musical College was reorganised into the Tbilisi Conservatory. The post of director was offered to pianist and teacher N. Nikolayev, and that of inspector to Z. Paliashvili. In 1918, when Nikolayev left Georgia, Paliashvili became the director of the Conservatorie. in 1919 he was awarded a professor's degree. Paliashvili continued to conduct classes in theoretical subjects at the Conservatorie.

At the turn of the century, Paliashvili commenced working on his first opera, Abesalom da Eteri. He was inspired in this by a folk legend, "Eteriany", which had been published in the Paskunji magazine (the fire bird, 1908) and rendered in the form of an opera libretto by Petre Mirianashvili, a teacher, writer and public personality of the time. The plot of the opera is based on a story of a prince who falls in love with a beautiful village girl. Believing in the sincerity of Absalom's feelings Etery marries him. At the same time, Murman, the closest friend of the prince and his visier also falls in love with Etery. Through malicious intrigues Murman destroys the happiness of the young couple. Parted from Etery Absalom falls ill and dies. Etery does not wish to live without Absalom and stabs herself to death. The opening night of this opera took place on February 21, 1919. It was produced by A. Tsutsunava and conducted by the author. The leading parts were performed by B. Zapliski (Absalom), who was soon substituted by Vano Sarajishvili; O. Bakutashvili-Shulgina (Etery) and Sandro Inashvili (Murman).

The rousing success of his first opera had inspired Paliashvili to compose another – the lyrical-drama Daisi ("Twilight" or "Sunset") founded on the libretto by Valerian Gunia, a stage art personality, actor and playwright. The drama of love and jealousy in Daisi is shown against the background of national genre scenes. Maro, a beautiful young girl, is betrothed by the will of her parents to Kiazo, who is brave and ambitious. The girl, however, loves her childhood friend Malkhaz, a young warrior. Tsangal, the village jester, tells Kiazo about this, and the latter challenges Malkhaz. At this time the country is attacked by enemies. The people are alarmed, but the adversaries, forgetting their duty to their Motherland, continue duelling and Malkhaz is mortally wounded. The people sternly censure the man who failed to restrain his passions on the day of trial to the country. Maro grieves over the death of her sweetheart. Thus, twilight falls prematurely on the life of the three young people. Paliashvili dedicated this work to his only son Irakly, whose untimely death he had suffered deeply.

The first showing of Daisi was held on December 19, 1923. It was produced and directed by Kote Marjanishvili, the sets were designed by Valerian Sidamon-Eristavi, the conductor was Ivane Paliashvili. The leading parts were performed by V. Sarajishvili (Malkhaz), E. Popova (Maro) and Krzhizhanovsky (Kiazko). When Sarajishvili died in November 1924 the part of Malkhaz was performed by a number of remarkable singers: N. Kumsiashvili, D. Andguladze, D. Badridze and M. Kvarelashvili.

Paliashvili's third opera, Latavra, after the libretto by Sandro Shanshiashvili, appeared five years later (the first showing was on March 16, 1928). Subsequent revisions (in 1950, particularly) noticeably improved the shortcomings of this opera which were mainly of an ideological character. "Daisi" and Latavra", a romance "who do I love?" to words by Ilia Chavchavadze and "lullaby" to the words of Mikhail Lermontov and several chamber pieces were dedicated to Nadejda Ivanovna Buzogly (Abashidze), a close friend of the composer, a merited artist of the Georgian Republic, professor of the Chair of Solo Singing of the Tbilisi Conservatorie, and candidate of sciences (arts). The "Collection of Ten Georgian and Russian folk songs" was dedicated by Paliashvili to Buzogly's sons Mikhail and Alexy. Paliashvili always enjoyed real friendship and respect of his talent in the family of the well-known civil engineer Mikhail Buzogly and his wife.

=== Soviet period ===
Early in 1929 Paliashvili was invited to Ukraine to conduct two concerts of Georgian music in Kharkov, then the capital of Ukrainian Soviet Republic. The concerts were held on January 28 and 29 and were very successful. The Ukrainian musical world warmly greeted the great Georgian composer. The reception in honor of Paliashvili was attended by distinguished representatives of Ukrainian culture and also by Henri Barbusse, a French writer who was on a visit to the Soviet Union at that time. He warmly thanked Zakharia Paliashvili for the aesthetic pleasure and for the discovery he had made "of a new world of musical Georgia". It was there that the idea came to produce in Kharkov Absalom and Eteri and in Tbilisi Taras Bulba, a Ukrainian classical opera by Nikolay Lysenko. Both were produced as suggested, the former in Kharkov on October 18, 1931 (Director – A. Pagava, décor – S. Nadareishvili), and the latter in Tbilisi in the winter of 1933. Absalom and Eteri was produced in Ukrainian by Konstantin Tsagareli, a gifted lawyer and close friend of the composer, jointly with O. Varava.

In the summer of 1929, Paliashvili made his second visit to Azerbaijan. Two symphonic concerts were given in Baku, the capital of the republic, on July 23 and 24. The program was made up of Paliashvili's works and the author conducted the orchestra.

=== Sickness and death ===
Since the beginning of the 1930s, Paliashvili was frequently unwell. Having been diagnosed with sarcoma of the adrenal gland, the composer was taken to Leningrad to their friend Yustin Janelidze, a famous Soviet-Georgian surgeon. Janelidze operated on Paliashvili, but when he saw that surgical interference would do no good, he stopped the operation and sewed up the wound. He estimated that Paliashvili had only several months to live. Paliashvili was bedridden during the summer months of 1933 and his condition continually deteriorated, all the while a new season had begun at the Tbilisi Opera House. Several days before his death, Paliashvili reportedly wished to hear his opera Abesalom da Eteri for the last time. The radio was switched on and Paliashvili strained to listen, happy at first but soon contorted with severe pain. At 5 p.m. on October 6, 1933, he died.

Paliashvili was buried on October 10 in the garden of the opera house next to the grave of his friend Ivane "Vano" Sarajishvili, known as the "Georgian nightingale". By a decree of the Soviet Georgian Government, the Tbilisi Second Musical School, the Tbilisi Ten-Year Musical School, the Batumi Musical School and a street in Tbilisi were named after the late composer. Later, a street in Moscow was also named after him.

In 1959, the entire second floor of 10 Barnov Street, where Paliashvili lived from 1915 to 1933, was set aside as his Home-Museum, which contains valuable materials relating to the life and work of the composer. On October 8, 1962, a special ceremony marked the opening of a permanent exhibition at this museum. Another permanent exhibition dedicated mainly to the childhood and youth of the composer was opened in Kutaisi, in the house where he was born. There are special exhibits on Paliashvili's life and work at the M. I. Glinka All-Union Museum of Musical Culture in Moscow.

== Works ==
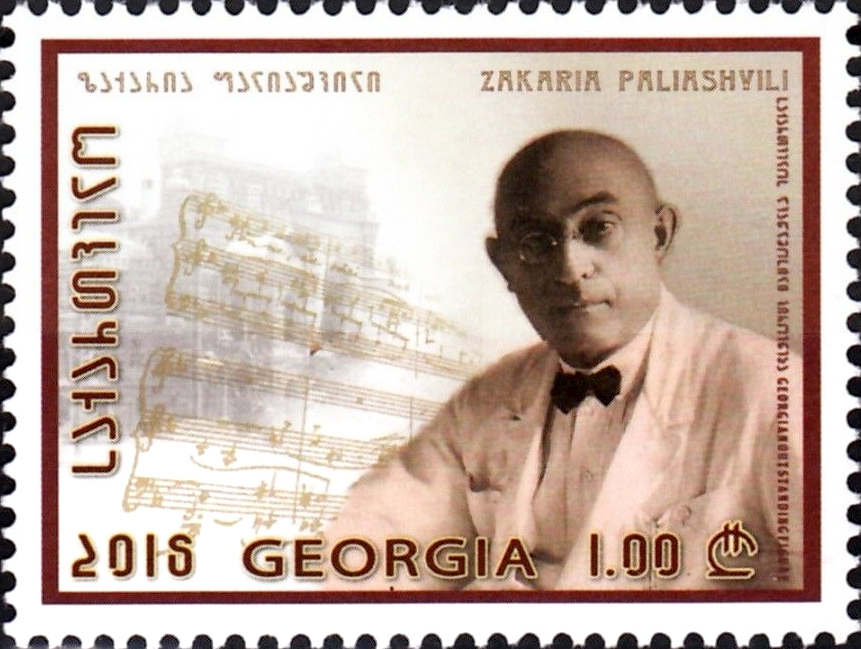
Paliashvili on a 2018 stamp of Georgia

=== Operas ===
all premiered in Tbilisi

- Abesalom da Eteri (Absalom and Eteri)—4 acts, libretto by P. Mirianashvili, after Eteriani (1909–18; premiered 1919)
- Daisi (Twilight)—3 acts, libretto by V. Gunia, after poems by Shota Rustaveli, Nikoloz Baratashvili, Akvsenti Tsereteli and Vazha-Pshavela (1923, premiered 1923)
- Latavra – 4 acts, libretto after a play by S. Shanshiashvili (1927, premiered 1928)

=== Choral works ===
- "Mravalzhamieri" Many Years of Life (P. Mirianashvili), for tenor, chorus, and orchestra (1908)
- Kartuli liturgia Georgian Liturgy (1911) – adaptation of the Liturgy of St. John Chrysostom, in Georgian and in Russian Church Slavonic], for a capella chorus
- Sazejmo kantata Solemn Cantata on the 10th anniversary of the October Revolution, for solo voices, chorus, and orchestra (1927)
- "Iavnana" Lullaby (Tsereteli), for a capella chorus
- Tavisupleba (Georgian National Anthem)

=== Orchestral ===
- Kartuli suita Georgian Suite, 1928

=== Songs ===
(solo voice and piano, all from 1908)

- "Akhalagnago sulo" In love with youthful spirit (D. Tumanishvili)
- "Miqvarda (I loved)" (I. Grishashvili)
- "Nana shvilo" (Lullaby) (Ilia Chavchavadze)
- "Nu tvaltmaktsob" (Don't tempt me) (Grishashvili)
- "Ristvis miqvarkhar" (Why do I love you) (Chavchavadze)

=== Other works ===
- Collection of Georgian Folk Songs – 40 songs out of about 300 collected (1910)
- arrangements of traditional songs
- incidental music
- conservatory student works (sonatas, preludes)

=== Principal publishers ===
- Tbilisi
  - Muzfond Gruzii
- Moscow/Leningrad
  - Muzgiz
  - Muzyka
  - Sovetskij kompozitor
