= Snokhachestvo =

Sexual arrangement

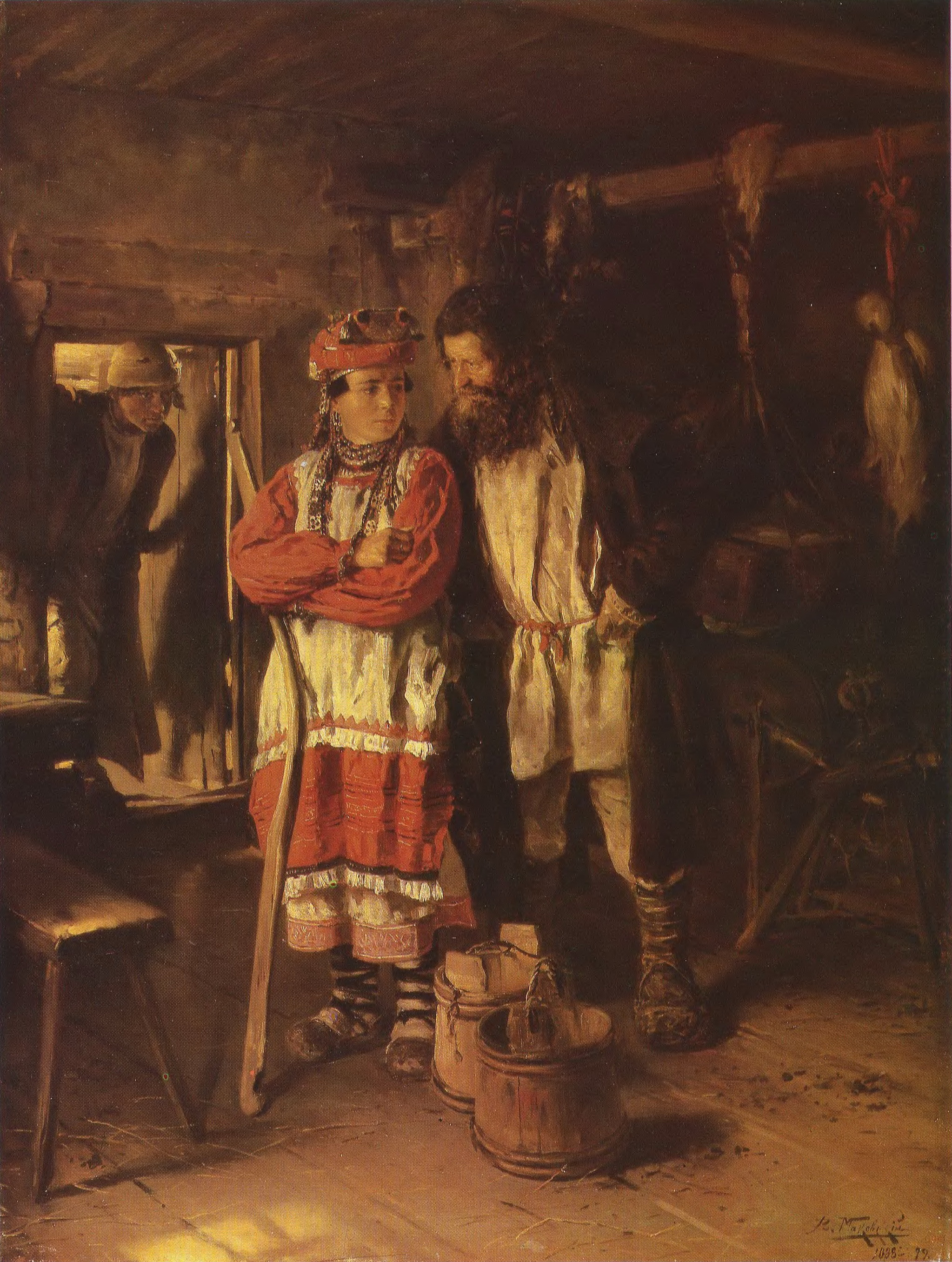
The Father-in-Law, a 1888 painting by Vladimir Makovsky

Snokhachestvo (Russian: снохачество; Ukrainian: снохацтво; Bulgarian: снахачество) was a form of sexual relationship historically attested among several Slavic peoples, particularly among Russians, Ukrainians, Belarusians, Bulgarians, and Serbs, in which the head of a patriarchal extended peasant household had sexual relations with his daughter-in-law (his son's wife). Such relationships most commonly arose while the son was still underage or during his prolonged absence, were associated with the organization of the traditional peasant household, and survived in some regions until the early 20th century.

Historical accounts commonly describe a characteristic form of snokhachestvo as involving the marriage of an underage son to an older woman brought into the household as an additional worker, while the father assumed the role of her de facto husband until the son reached maturity.

== Terminology ==
The term snokhachestvo derives from snokha ("daughter-in-law"), which in turn goes back to the Proto-Slavic *snъxa. Cognate terms are attested in several Slavic languages. Nayden Gerov's nineteenth-century Dictionary of the Bulgarian Language records the Bulgarian term snahachestvo, defining it as "when a father-in-law has illicit sexual relations with his daughter-in-law." Similarly, Ivan Franko used and defined the Ukrainian term snokhatstvo in his 1895 article Сліди снохацтва в наших горах (“Traces of Snokhachestvo in Our Mountains”), describing it as the custom whereby a father-in-law maintains conjugal relations with his daughter-in-law. Polish historian Adam Krawiec uses the term świekrostwo as the Polish equivalent of the Russian snokhachestvo.

== Hypotheses of early origins ==
According to legal historian and specialist in medieval law Władysław Abraham, snokhachestvo was interpreted as a remnant of some form of polyandry that existed among the Slavs before the adoption of Christianity. The exact nature of that form is unclear, as the practice may have already changed significantly by the time researchers began to observe and document it.

Historian Adam Krawiec similarly viewed the phenomenon as a form of polyandry, including fraternal polyandry among the Eastern Slavs. He suggested that snokhachestvo may have emerged or taken its final shape after Christianization, as a result of “enforced monogamization,” when the head of the household formally married a woman to his (often underage) son while continuing to live with her as his partner.

Abraham noted that a similar form of marriage existed among the pagan Prussians, where a son could inherit his father's wife: the father would use family resources to acquire a wife, and after his death, his son would marry her. He also pointed out that traces of polyandry observed among the Slavs resembled descriptions attributed to the Celtic Britons in Julius Caesar's Commentarii de Bello Gallico (1st century BCE):

“They have wives in common, especially brothers with brothers and fathers with sons.” — Gaius Julius Caesar, The Gallic War, Book V

Abraham also drew parallels with the relatively widespread practice of fraternal polyandry in the East.

Krawiec emphasized economic factors as a possible underlying cause of such arrangements, noting that the costs associated with marriage could encourage pooling of resources among male relatives. He also referred to the economic structure of the peasant household, where additional labor was often necessary for subsistence agriculture. Abraham likewise considered economic conditions a potential contributing factor, while acknowledging that multiple causes may have been involved.

Scholar and publicist Ivan Franko, in his 1895 article Сліди снохацтва в наших горах (“Traces of Snokhachestvo in Our Mountains”), also suggested ancient roots for the custom, but associated its occurrence primarily with the structure of the patriarchal extended peasant family (sometimes referred to as the zadruga). He argued that wherever such undivided family communes existed, snokhachestvo was more likely to occur.

== Historical development and perceptions ==
Ivan Franko suggested that a passage in the Primary Chronicle, a chronicle compiled in the early 12th century, may contain a reference to snokhachestvo among the Radimichs, Vyatichi, and Severians, noting that the chronicle describes behavior “before fathers and daughters-in-law” (“предъ отьци и предъ снохами”), which he interpreted as possibly indicative of such relations. Natalia Pushkareva has noted that the same chronicle describes marriage practices among these tribes as involving the consent of the bride, expressed by the phrase “with her agreement” (“с нею же кто съвещашеся”).

Władysław Abraham argued that after the introduction of Christianity, both the secular and ecclesiastical authorities of Rus’, opposing all forms of polygamy, also attempted—unsuccessfully—to eradicate those forms of polyandry associated with the development of snokhachestvo. As an example of such efforts, he pointed to the Church Statute of Yaroslav. A. Krawiec proposed a similar interpretation of the phenomenon.

As snokhachestvo was prohibited by law, references to it in archival sources are relatively rare. According to Abraham, a case described in Jan Piotrowski's Dziennik wyprawy Stefana Batorego pod Psków ("Diary of Stephen Báthory's Campaign against Pskov") constituted an example of snokhachestvo. In this account, while staying in Polotsk, Báthory recounts a case involving people who had been brought before him "recently here, in the Grand Duchy of Lithuania": in this family, a thirteen-year-old boy was married to a woman with whom his father lived “as with a wife” while awaiting the son’s coming of age. Báthory presented the episode as an example of local customs that he sought to eradicate.

Abraham also argued that echoes of such relationships can be found in numerous folk tales and legends about relationships between mothers and sons in Ukraine, Belarus, and among the East Slavs.

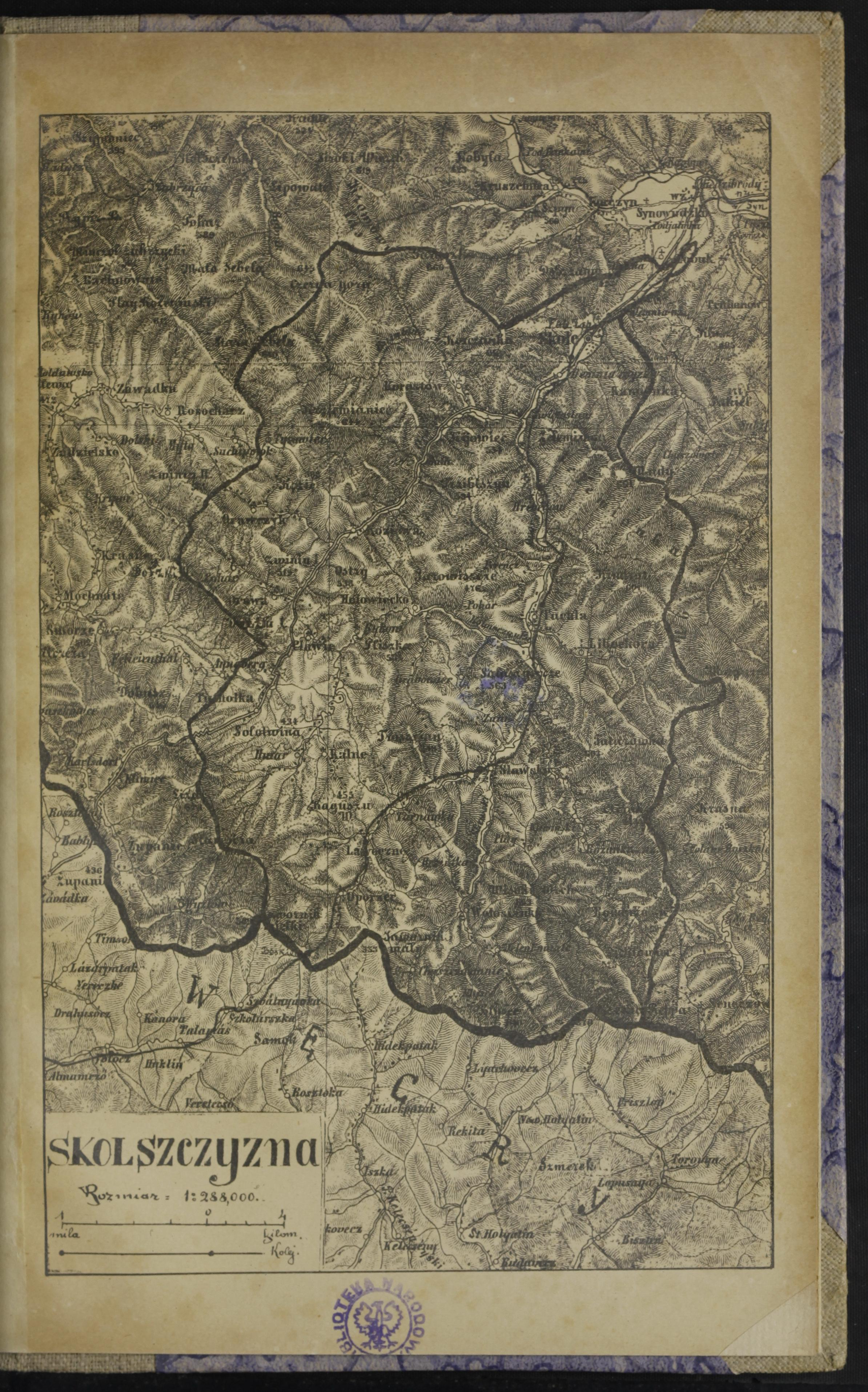
Map of the Skole region from Fryderyk Papée’s Skole i Tucholszczyzna (1891).

An indication of such practices appears in an early 17th-century instruction issued by Princess Teofila Ostrogska (widow of Janusz Ostrogski), whose estates were located in the Opir River valley (in the area of present-day Skole and Tukhlia). In the instruction, she prescribed: “If it should occur, as happens there [in the mountains], that a father-in-law lives in illicit relations with his daughter-in-law, he is to be punished by death, with the matter reported to me.” Ivan Franko regarded this passage as clear evidence that snokhachestvo existed at that time in the Skole Mountains (in the present-day Skole Beskids) and was apparently quite widespread, since Ostrogska not only found it necessary to write a draconian decree against it but explicitly referred to the practice as something that "happens there" (i.e., in the mountains). Ivan Franko further argued that the severity of the prescribed punishment reflects the attitudes prevalent in the lowland regions from which the princess and her officials came (the princess herself having been born into the Polish Tarło family), where such practices were either unknown or regarded as a rare phenomenon, a “cultural remnant”. Franko further argued that the cruel and uncompromising persecution of snokhachestvo by Ostrogska also shows that she was detached from the family structures that had led to its emergence and regarded it purely as a moral failing, the result of individual willfulness, rather than as a sociological issue—that is, one in which the individual’s will is more or less constrained by economic conditions, customs, and legal norms prevalent in their immediate environment.

Illustrations from Balthasar Hacquet's book

“Pokutian” woman

“Pokutian” man

About 170 years later, the Austrian traveler, naturalist, and pioneer of mountaineering Belsazar Hacquet reported the existence of snokhachestvo on the opposite side of the Skole Mountains, in the Hutsul region, noting that "formerly it had been more widespread than now." Ivan Franko cited this testimony in his article and suggested that Hacquet’s reference to Pokutians in fact referred to the Hutsuls. Franko further observed that the account appeared credible and may indicate that the custom was still present in the late 18th century.

According to Laura Engelstein, Aleksandr Radishchev invoked snokhachestvo to illustrate what she describes as the abuse of power by men in patriarchal peasant families. In his A Journey from St. Petersburg to Moscow (1790), Radishchev has the peasant woman Anyuta recount that she once refused a proposed marriage to a ten-year-old boy: "A prosperous peasant household once sought my hand for a ten-year-old boy, but I refused. What could I do with a child? By the time he came of age, I would already be old... They say that the father-in-law sleeps with his daughters-in-law until his sons grow up. That is why I did not want to enter that household. I wanted someone my own age."

The Narodnik writer Gleb Uspensky, while deploring the plight of young peasant women, sympathized with "the emotional and physical needs of the mature peasant man."

== Social and economic conditions in the 18th–19th centuries ==
Regardless of how scholars have interpreted the historical origins of snokhachestvo, most modern scholars have emphasized the social and economic conditions associated with the practice in the 18th and 19th centuries.

=== Russian Empire ===
The sources discussed in this subsection concern the historical Russian Empire, whose territory extended across parts of what are now Russia, Ukraine, Belarus, and other countries.

Some accounts associated snokhachestvo with the prolonged absence of young husbands, including men who were away working or serving in the military. Historian Laura Engelstein notes that late nineteenth-century observers still believed the practice persisted, associating it with the seasonal absence of young husbands working away from their villages, although they also reported that it was increasingly condemned within peasant communities.

Descriptions of snokhachestvo in archival records are rare, making its prevalence in the Russian Empire difficult to establish.

Historian and cultural anthropologist Natalia Pushkareva explains the phenomenon primarily through demographic and economic factors while also noting the importance of local marriage norms. She argues that among peasants in the Russian Empire, marriages were often arranged with practical considerations in mind, and significant age asymmetries were not uncommon, including unions in which the wife was several years—sometimes substantially—older than the husband. In some regions, marriages involving very young boys and older brides could serve practical economic purposes by providing an additional adult worker for the household. In some cases, she notes, such age disparities could be considerable, with wives old enough to be their husbands' mothers. Ethnographic evidence (e.g., from Olga Semenova-Tian-Shanskaia) suggests that in some rural communities—unlike in elite and urban social milieus—such pairings were socially accepted and, in some cases, locally normative, with young men marrying women a few years older (for example, men aged 18–20 marrying women aged 20–26) without social stigma, while matches with older grooms could be viewed negatively. Ethnographic anecdotes from the Don Cossacks similarly illustrate how local marriage norms could differ from modern expectations: one young woman reportedly rejected even high-ranking military suitors, saying that she would marry only the infant boy she was rocking once he had grown up — and, according to the account, she eventually did so. These patterns were partly shaped by economic priorities—such as the preference for physically mature and productive brides or the delayed marriage of daughters—but also reflected stable local customs. More broadly, age relations between spouses varied considerably between regions and local communities, although multiple patterns could also coexist within the same locality. Pronounced age mismatches within households involving relatively young husbands and older wives could narrow generational differences between fathers-in-law and daughters-in-law. As noted in ethnographic accounts, such dynamics could contribute to the spread of snokhachestvo, though they did not automatically result in it. Pushkareva nevertheless emphasizes that age-asymmetric marriages and local acceptance of such unions did not preclude coercive sexual relations within peasant households.

Map of European Russia from William Coxe’s Travels into Poland, Russia, Sweden, and Denmark (1784).

The English clergyman William Coxe, who travelled through the Russian Empire in the second half of the eighteenth century, described snokhachestvo as a practice found in some parts of the empire and regarded as contrary to Christian moral norms. Coxe reported that such unions had formerly been more widespread, but were declining due to government measures and increasing efforts by church authorities to suppress the custom. Like other Christian churches recognizing prohibitions based on affinity, the Russian Orthodox Church regarded snokhachestvo as a form of krovosmeshchenie arising from relations by marriage. It was also considered unseemly by the obshchina, the rural community.

S. G. Fedorov notes that archival descriptions of snokhachestvo are extremely rare. He explains the phenomenon in relation to the structure of the traditional peasant household. In large peasant families, several nuclear families of different generations usually lived together under the authority of the bolshak, the head of the household. Fedorov also notes that snokhachestvo was associated with serious crimes in some cases, such as rape and murders motivated by jealousy. At the same time, peasant communities sometimes responded to cases of snokhachestvo through forms of extrajudicial punishment or vigilante justice, including beatings. He argues, however, that cases of snokhachestvo were often left outside the scope of peasant self-justice because of the dominant position of the large patriarchal household, which functioned as an important economic and social unit in rural life. He also notes that historians continue to debate whether peasant self-justice should be understood as part of customary law or as an extraordinary measure existing outside customary law.

The position of daughters-in-law during a husband's minority could make them vulnerable to sexual coercion by their fathers-in-law. Among historians, however, there is disagreement about how widespread such practices were.

Bezgin argues that early marriages may have contributed to the practice of snokhachestvo. As an example, he cites ethnographer A. P. Zvonkov’s description of marriages between 12–13-year-old boys and 16–17-year-old brides in several villages of Yelatomsky Uyezd in Tambov Governorate. However, Zvonkov himself neither links such marriages to snokhachestvo nor presents them as one of its causes. The interpretation that such marriages contributed to snokhachestvo comes from Bezgin, not from Zvonkov's account. Snokhachestvo could also create tensions within the household, including between mothers-in-law and daughters-in-law. Contemporary accounts describe a range of reactions, including jealousy, but do not suggest a single universal pattern.

==== Don Cossacks ====
This subsection concerns the historical Don Cossack communities along the Don River, in areas now mainly in southern Russia. Ethnographer M. N. Kharuzin devoted a substantial study to various aspects of Don Cossack life, including the practice of snokhachestvo. Among the Don Cossacks, marriages were often arranged by the parents. Kharuzin noted that among Old Believer Don Cossacks, fathers sometimes married their sons at a very young age to women aged about twenty or older, ostensibly to bring a worker into the household. In such cases, the bride was chosen “of course, one that he himself liked” and after the wedding began paying her court. “The attention of the head of the household and the full freedom he granted would flatter the daughter-in-law’s vanity.”

By the 1880s, ethnographic accounts suggest that attitudes toward such practices were changing: ethnographer M. N. Kharuzin recorded complaints from older Cossack men who claimed that young brides sometimes invoked accusations of improper conduct by a father-in-law in order to leave an arranged marriage. According to their account, a bride who wished to depart shortly after the wedding might allege harassment, even where none had occurred. As men from the Chernyshevskaya stanitsa reportedly told Kharuzin: “A girl might fall for someone else before the wedding, and three days after it, she leaves. And then the only excuse the women give is, ‘The father-in-law has been making advances,’ even though he may not have done anything.”

In some cases, snokhachestvo led to the murder of the father-in-law, committed either by his wife or by his own son. According to Cossack informants, more submissive wives, noticing their husband's illicit conduct toward the daughter-in-law, sometimes pretended not to see anything, believing that “grief cannot be helped by swearing and shouting.”

=== Galicia ===
The sources discussed in this subsection concern territories that are now part of western Ukraine. Scholar and publicist Ivan Franko associated snokhachestvo primarily with the structure of the patriarchal extended family or zadruga, arguing that traces of the practice could serve as evidence that undivided family communes had once been more widespread. Referring to earlier studies of communal and extended-family institutions in different parts of Ukraine, he suggested that reports of snokhachestvo in the Carpathian region should be understood in this broader social context.

At the same time, Franko also connected the practice with economic considerations within peasant households. He wrote that fathers sometimes arranged marriages between underage sons and older women in order to introduce an additional adult worker into the household, while the father himself assumed the role of husband until the son reached maturity. According to Franko, such arrangements were characteristic of patriarchal large-family households and survived despite opposition from both church and state authorities.

Discussing late nineteenth-century Galicia, Ivan Franko wrote that cases of snokhachestvo also occurred in his region, especially in the Carpathian foothill areas, though usually as isolated incidents. Franko observed that little attention had so far been paid to such cases, not least because the men concerned had every reason to keep them hidden, although some cases nevertheless reached the courts.

Writing in 1895, Franko describes a case heard about ten years earlier in the district court of Drohobych. A widower, “not yet very old,” had married off his eldest son in order to bring additional labor and assistance into the household. The son, however, unlike the younger and more dependent sons more typical of such households, refused to submit to his father’s authority and sought a division of the family property. Among other complaints, he accused his father in court of “making advances” toward his wife. As the son declared during the hearing: “When I married, it was for myself, not for my father.”

The father vehemently denied the accusation, swearing that he had never touched his daughter-in-law improperly. The court preferred to take the old man’s denial at face value. Yet Franko interpreted the episode as evidence that snokhachestvo and the patriarchal extended-family structures associated with it had continued to survive in rural Galician society into the late nineteenth century.

=== Bulgaria and neighboring Balkan regions ===
In the 19th century, in villages around Sofia, Caribrod (now Dimitrovgrad), Breznik, Radomir, the Kyustendil region, and the Kraishte area, boys were often married at a young age to older women—typically grooms aged 15–18 and brides 20–25. According to historian and Slavist Konstantin Jireček in his The Principality of Bulgaria (1899), this practice was explained by the desire to introduce an additional adult worker into the household as early as possible, while daughters were kept in their parental homes longer so that their labor could continue to contribute to the family economy. Marriages were commonly arranged by parents without consulting the children, and in some cases girls were compelled to marry despite existing attachments. In such unions, the conjugal role of underage husbands was at times assumed by the father or another elder male relative, where such figures still existed. Jireček associated these practices with domestic conflict, including disputes, divorce, and occasionally violent outcomes. He recounts a case from the Kraishté area in which a peasant, having married off his still very young son, killed his daughter-in-law after failing to establish the desired relations, and was subsequently sentenced to 15 years’ imprisonment.

== Legal status ==
In Europe, the prohibition of relations between a father-in-law and daughter-in-law existed within the Christian tradition: from the Church's perspective, marriage constituted a spiritual and bodily union, creating between the relatives of the spouses a form of kinship that, for certain prohibitions, was treated as equivalent to blood kinship. Therefore, sexual relations between a father-in-law and daughter-in-law (as well as relations between a father and a son with the same woman) were regarded by ecclesiastical law as “incest”, which was considered a grave sin and entailed severe penalties, including several years of penance.

The prohibitions thus applied to both parties to a sexual relationship, although the penalties could vary according to the legal system.

Here, “incest” is used in the historical legal or ecclesiastical sense, which could include certain relationships of affinity, rather than in the narrower modern sense of sexual relations between people related by blood.

On the basis of the belief that man and woman became “one flesh” through the union of their bodies, affinity was subject to marriage prohibitions parallel to those based on blood kinship; thus, a father-in-law and daughter-in-law were prohibited from marrying each other. The affinal relationship continued even after the marriage that had created it ended, including when one of the spouses died. The same affinal relationships were therefore subject not only to prohibitions on sexual relations but also to prohibitions on marriage.

The same prohibitions applied to other relationships by affinity, including those with the siblings of one's spouse and those between a stepson and his stepmother, among many other combinations.

Under the influence of canon law, such restrictions were gradually incorporated into secular legislation from the seventh century onward. In particular, secular laws provided penalties for persons who had committed “incest” and had failed to perform the penance imposed by the Church, ranging from fines and confiscation of property to imprisonment. However, it is unclear to what extent such provisions were enforced in practice, since such practices, like most forms of conduct that violated legal norms and were punishable by law, are poorly represented in the surviving sources.

Such legal prohibitions do not, in themselves, demonstrate the existence or prevalence of snokhachestvo in a particular territory; the examples below are linked, where possible, to territories where the practice is documented or whose legal traditions influenced them.

At a council held in Pavia in 850, the bishops considered ways of combating cohabitation between fathers-in-law and daughters-in-law, a custom that was then spreading especially among peasants: there were many cases in which adult women were brought into a household ostensibly as wives for underage sons, but subsequently had sexual relations with their fathers-in-law. More than half a century earlier, bishops meeting at the Council of Forum Julii had encountered a similar problem. To prevent this practice, a prohibition was introduced against marriages between underage sons and adult women.

Under both Roman and German systems of reckoning degrees of kinship, a father-in-law and daughter-in-law were considered related by affinity in the first degree.

Prohibitions on sexual relations between close affinal relatives were maintained in both Western and Eastern Christian traditions, although their scope and secular penalties could differ.

In Kievan Rus' (whose territories now lie in parts of Russia, Ukraine, and Belarus), the Church Statute of Yaroslav (dated to a period between the eleventh and thirteenth centuries) prescribed penance and a fine of 40 grivnas for sexual relations between a father-in-law and daughter-in-law.

In Byzantine law, in particular the Ecloga, sexual relations between persons related by affinity within the first and second degrees could be punished by cutting off the nose. These rules were transmitted to medieval Bulgaria, where legal texts likewise prescribed this punishment for “incest” between a father-in-law and daughter-in-law. However, Bulgarian legal texts also provided for milder measures, including the separation of persons who had entered into an unlawful marriage.

In medieval Serbia, marriage between a father-in-law and daughter-in-law was likewise prohibited. Serbian legal compilations contained both ecclesiastical and secular provisions treating close consanguineous and affinal relationships as impediments to marriage. The Syntagma of Matthew Blastares likewise prescribed flogging and cutting off the nose for sexual relations between a father-in-law and daughter-in-law.

Article CXLII of the Bambergische Peinliche Halsgerichtsordnung (1507).

In the Polish–Lithuanian Commonwealth, which until the late eighteenth century included territories that are now part of Ukraine and Belarus, the legal treatment of “incest” varied between different jurisdictions. From the sixteenth through the eighteenth centuries, land law did not contain penalties for “incest”, whereas German-derived municipal law in force in many towns prescribed the death penalty for it. In particular, in a sixteenth-century compilation of criminal law by Bartłomiej Groicki based on material derived from the Carolina (Constitutio Criminalis Carolina, the criminal and judicial code of the Holy Roman Empire first printed in 1533), the relevant provision (Article LXXII) followed the corresponding provision of the Carolina. Under these rules, certain forms of “incest”, including relations between persons related by affinity, could be punished by death. Article CXVII of the Carolina classified sexual relations between a father-in-law and daughter-in-law as a criminal offence and referred to previously established law for the applicable punishment. The corresponding provisions (Articles CXLII and CXLV) of the Bambergensis, promulgated in 1507, prescribed the death penalty for such relations.

In practice, however, such punishments were imposed very rarely; in the case of peasants, hanging was often replaced by flogging combined with church penance. At the same time, surviving evidence shows that landlords could also impose severe punishments on peasants for such relations.

In the Austrian Empire, which acquired Galicia and some other parts of present-day Ukraine after the partitions of Poland:

1. In the 1768 criminal code of Maria Theresa, “incest” was referred to as Blutschande, a legal term denoting prohibited sexual relations within certain degrees of consanguinity and affinity. It included relations between a father-in-law and daughter-in-law, which were punishable by “severe corporal punishment” and expulsion from the judicial district.

2. The 1787 criminal code of Joseph II contained no provision on incest. However, in the same year, an imperial court decree was promulgated in some Austrian territories stating that “incest that had become publicly known and caused a scandal” was to be treated and punished as a political offence. The term “incest” in this context also included relations with sons' wives.

3. Under the Austrian Criminal Code of 1852, sexual relations between a father-in-law and daughter-in-law were punishable under § 501 by imprisonment under strict conditions for a term of one to three months.

At the turn of the eighteenth and nineteenth centuries, criminal law concerning sexual conduct in some European countries began to become more lenient under the influence of Enlightenment ideas; in the Polish–Lithuanian Commonwealth, this change was already evident toward the end of its existence.

This trend was not uniform across Europe, however, and it did not extend to the Russian Empire, which encompassed most of the territory of present-day Russia and parts of present-day Ukraine and Belarus. Under Russian imperial law, sexual relations between a father-in-law and daughter-in-law fell under the legal category of krovosmeshchenie (“incest”), a historical Russian legal term denoting prohibited sexual relations between persons related by blood or affinity within certain degrees specified by law. The authors of the 1845 Code of Criminal and Correctional Punishments described krovosmeshchenie as violating “not only the laws of our faith and the positive law of all civil societies, but the very feelings instilled by nature” and prescribed a particularly severe punishment for it.

Under the 1885 edition of the Code of Criminal and Correctional Punishments of the Russian Empire, sexual relations between a father-in-law and daughter-in-law were punishable by exile to the Tomsk or Tobolsk Governorates for settlement or by assignment to correctional units. The Brockhaus and Efron Encyclopedic Dictionary noted that peasants generally regarded snokhachestvo as a crime, though not a particularly serious one, as evidenced by the verdicts of pre-reform volost (peasant) courts. Such courts could impose comparatively mild penalties, including several days of arrest or flogging.

The commission responsible for drafting the 1903 Criminal Code of the Russian Empire sought to eliminate archaic provisions on krovosmeshchenie as part of a broader effort to modernize and secularize criminal law. European legal scholarship offered no clear guidance: "Looking for new secular motivations to justify the remnants of old religious prescriptions, European legal scholars frequently ended in confusion about how to conceptualize the crime of incest in modern terms." Some jurists argued that consensual “incest” (krovosmeshchenie) between adults should not be a separate criminal offence, and that only conduct involving abuse of authority, breach of trust, or the corruption of minors should be punishable under other criminal provisions. Others disagreed. The jurist Vladimir Dmitrievich Nabokov (father of the novelist Vladimir Nabokov) published Plotskie prestupleniia po proektu Ugolovnogo ulozheniia ("Carnal Crimes under the Draft Criminal Code"), a legal commentary on the Russian Empire's draft Criminal Code of 1903. His article compared the Russian draft with contemporary French, German, English, Italian, and Austrian legislation and legal scholarship. In discussing the proposed provisions on krovosmeshchenie, Nabokov noted that some European legal systems did not treat it as a criminal offence. He nevertheless argued that the Russian Empire could not simply abolish penalties for krovosmeshchenie, since, in his view, "nowhere, it seems, except Russia, has at least one form of krovosmeshchenie assumed the character of an almost normal social phenomenon, designated by the appropriate technical term—snokhachestvo." (Here "Russia" refers to the Russian Empire, whose draft Criminal Code Nabokov was discussing.) Analogous practices and corresponding terminology have also been documented among other Slavic peoples, for example the Bulgarian term snahachestvo.

== 19th-century evidence and statistics ==
Assessments of the prevalence of snokhachestvo varied considerably between regions and sources. While some authors described it as a relatively widespread feature of the patriarchal peasant household, others considered it rare, concealed, or strongly condemned within rural communities. Much of the available evidence derives from ethnographic reports, court records, and informant testimony, which sometimes present conflicting accounts.

Ethnographer and writer Sergey V. Maksimov, in his study “Сибирь и каторга” (“Siberia and Penal Servitude”, 1871), analyzed criminal statistics relating to convictions for krovosmeshchenie in the Russian Empire. According to data he cited for a nine-year period, 61 men and 48 women were convicted of such offenses.

He reported that such cases were recorded most frequently in the Tobolsk, Vyatka, and Perm governorates, as well as in the territory of the Don Cossack Host and in the Poltava and Kharkov governorates, and that they were most common among peasants, with a particularly high incidence among former military settlers and Don Cossacks. Among the forms of krovosmeshchenie reflected in these statistics, relations between a father-in-law and daughter-in-law occupied the most prominent place. Maksimov wrote that, unlike many other forms of krovosmeshchenie—most of which, in his account, involved coercion—snokhachestvo represented a form of relationship that could be based on mutual agreement between the participants. At the same time, according to historian Sergey G. Fedorov, Maksimov regarded snokhachestvo as a morally reprehensible phenomenon associated with further adulterous relations.

Ethnographic materials from the Oryol Governorate reveal divergent assessments. Some informants described tolerant attitudes toward certain forms of affinal sexual relations in villages such as Konevka and Melovoe, while other testimonies emphasized that such relationships were regarded as grave sins under Orthodox moral teaching. Modern historians have interpreted this material differently, highlighting either the tolerance of such practices or the persistence of strong religious condemnation.

Ethnographer P. M. Bogaevsky describes snokhachestvo as uncommon among Sarapul peasants, stating that it was not a usual occurrence. He adds that only occasionally did well-read peasants justify the practice by reference to the Bible. He does not specify which biblical passage was cited.

Ethnographer N. A. Kostrov notes that, between 1836 and 1861, courts in the Tomsk Governorate dealt with only seven cases of snokhachestvo, all of which, however, involved coercion. He describes the practice as relatively rare or suggests that it may have been concealed.

Similar observations were made in Galicia. Ivan Franko, in his article Сліди снохацтва в наших горах (“Traces of snokhachestvo in Our Mountains”), reports that by the time of writing (late 19th century), isolated cases of snokhachestvo were recorded there, particularly in the Carpathian foothills.

== Disappearance ==
As the patriarchal peasant household continued to disintegrate and land divisions became more common, snokhachestvo—already a vestigial phenomenon by the late 19th century—began to disappear altogether. The small, nuclear family became predominant in the village, with married sons and their parents living separately, and under such conditions, snokhachestvo no longer had any place.

== Snokhachestvo in the arts ==
There are sexual connotations in the relationship between Katerina and her father-in-law in Shostakovich's 1934 opera Lady Macbeth of the Mtsensk District, but not in the 1865 story it is based upon.

In 1927, Olga Preobrazhenskaia, "the leading woman director of [Soviet] fiction films in the twenties", and her co-director, Ivan Pravov, released a film condemning snokhachestvo. Titled The Peasant Women of Ryazan (in Russian, Baby ryazanskie), the silent film is about the rape and pregnancy of a woman whose husband is away in World War I. The rapist is her father-in-law, and the woman, overcome by shame, drowns herself when her husband returns from battle.

In the 1910 novel Impure Blood (Nečista krv) by the Serbian writer Borisav Stanković, the heroine Sofka is married into a family in which snokhachestvo is portrayed as a long-established custom. The novel depicts a rural community where fathers-in-law are said to cohabit with their daughters-in-law and where boys may be married off at a young age so that adult women can be brought into the household as workers. Sofka's father-in-law Marko, himself a product of such a family tradition, becomes obsessed with her and is driven to self-destruction by the conflict between his desire for his daughter-in-law and his awareness of its moral implications.

== Literature ==
- Pieniądz-Skrzypczak, Aneta (2009). "Incest in Early Medieval Society". Acta Poloniae Historica. 99: 39–61. ISSN 0001-6829.
- Lanzinger, Margareth (2023). Administrating Kinship: Marriage Impediments and Dispensation Policies in the 18th and 19th Centuries. Legal History Library. Vol. 63. Leiden: Brill. ISBN 978-90-04-43107-2.
- Engelstein, Laura (1992). The Keys to Happiness: Sex and the Search for Modernity in Fin-de-siècle Russia. Ithaca, New York: Cornell University Press. ISBN 0-8014-9958-5.
- Petasz, Paweł (2025). "Incest as a Sexual Crime in Polish Criminal Law: A Relic of the Past or Still a Necessity in the Present?". Gdańskie Studia Prawnicze (4(69)): 200–221. doi:10.26881/gsp.2025.4.12.
- Abraham, Władysław (1925). Zawarcie małżeństwa w pierwotnem prawie polskiem [Entering into marriage in the original Polish law]. Studia nad Historią Prawa Polskiego (in Polish). Lwów: Towarzystwo Naukowe we Lwowie. pp. 15–17.
- Krawiec, Adam (2000). Seksualność w średniowiecznej Polsce [Sexuality in medieval Poland] (in Polish). Poznań: Wydawnictwo Poznańskie. pp. 69–70. ISBN 83-7177-035-9.
- Franko, Ivan (1895). "Сліди снохацтва в наших горах" [Traces of Snokhachestvo in Our Mountains]. Житє і слово [Life and Word] (in Ukrainian). 4. Lviv: Stauropegion Institute Press: 101–104.
- Jireček, Konstantin (1899). Княжество България [The Principality of Bulgaria] (in Bulgarian). Plovdiv: Hr. G. Danov. p. 92.
- Pushkareva, Natalia L. (1997). Частная жизнь русской женщины: невеста, жена, любовница (X — начало XIX в.) [Private Life of a Russian Woman: Bride, Wife, Lover (10th–early 19th century)] (in Russian). Moscow: Ladomir. ISBN 5-86218-230-6.
- Kharuzin, Mikhail N. (2004). "Сведения о казацких общинах на Дону: материалы для обычного права" [Information about Cossack communities on the Don: materials for customary law]. Русская семейная и сексуальная культура глазами историков, этнографов, литераторов, фольклористов, правоведов и богословов XIX — начала XX века [Russian Family and Sexual Culture Through the Eyes of Historians, Ethnographers, Writers, Folklorists, Jurists and Theologians of the 19th – Early 20th Centuries] (in Russian). Vol. 2. Moscow: Ladomir. pp. 78–233. ISBN 5-86218-444-9.
- "Кровосмешение". Encyclopedic Dictionary of Brockhaus and Efron (in Russian). Saint Petersburg: F. A. Brockhaus and I. A. Efron. 1895. p. 801.
- Smirnov, Aleksandr G. (2004). "Очерки семейных отношений по обычному праву русского народа" [Essays on Family Relations in the Customary Law of the Russian People]. Русская семейная и сексуальная культура глазами историков, этнографов, литераторов, фольклористов, правоведов и богословов XIX — начала XX века [Russian Family and Sexual Culture Through the Eyes of Historians, Ethnographers, Writers, Folklorists, Jurists and Theologians of the 19th – Early 20th Centuries] (in Russian). Vol. 1. Moscow: Ladomir. pp. 356–557. ISBN 5-86218-443-0.
- Semenova-Tian-Shanskaia, Olga P. (2004). "Жизнь «Ивана». Очерки из быта крестьян одной из чернозёмных губерний" [The Life of “Ivan”: Essays on the Everyday Life of Peasants in One of the Black Earth Provinces]. Русская семейная и сексуальная культура глазами историков, этнографов, литераторов, фольклористов, правоведов и богословов XIX — начала XX века [Russian Family and Sexual Culture Through the Eyes of Historians, Ethnographers, Writers, Folklorists, Jurists and Theologians of the 19th – Early 20th Centuries] (in Russian). Vol. 1. Moscow: Ladomir. pp. 641–730. ISBN 5-86218-443-0.
- Žepič, Vid (2025). "Sexual Transgressions in Early Byzantine Law" (PDF). Anali Pravnog fakulteta u Beogradu. 73 (4): 743–769. doi:10.51204/Anali_PFBU_25403A.
