= Taimanov =

Taimanov (Russian: Тайманов) is a Russian masculine surname, its feminine counterpart is Taimanova. It may refer to

- Iskander Taimanov (born 1961), Russian mathematician
- Mark Taimanov (1926–2016), Russian chess Grandmaster and concert pianist

== See also ==
- Taimanov Variation, various chess openings used by Mark Taimanov
