= And Quiet Flows the Don (1930 film) =

1930 film

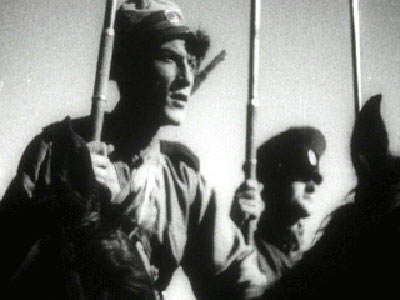
- Russian: Тихий Дон
- Directed by: Ivan Pravov; Olga Preobrazhenskaya
- Written by: Ivan Pravov; Olga Preobrazhenskaya
- Based on: And Quiet Flows the Don by Mikhail Sholokhov
- Starring: Nikolay Podgorny; Andrei Abrikosov; Emma Tsesarskaya; Raisa Puzhnaya; Aleksandr Gromov; Georgi Kovrov
- Cinematography: Dmitriy Feldman
- Release date: 1930
- Country: Soviet Union
- Language: Russian (silent)

And Quiet Flows the Don (Russian: Тихий Дон, romanized: Tikhiy Don, lit. 'Quiet Don') is a 1930 Soviet film directed by Ivan Pravov and Olga Preobrazhenskaya.

The film is an adaptation of the first two books of the eponymous novel by Mikhail Sholokhov.

== Plot ==
The film depicts the tragic circumstances that unfolded in Russia during the early 20th century, exploring the lives shattered by World War I and the revolution. It delves into the collapse of traditions and ideals within the Don Cossack community and the personal tragedy of the main character, Grigory Melekhov.

== Cast ==
- Nikolay Podgorny as Pantelej Prokofievich Melekhov
- Andrei Abrikosov as Grigori Pantelejevich Melekhov
- Emma Tsesarskaya as Aksinya Astagova
- Raisa Puzhnaya as Natalya Koshonova
- Aleksandr Gromov as Petr Melekhov
- Georgi Kovrov as Stepan Astakhov
- Yelena Maksimova as Daria Melekhova
- S. Churakovskaya as Aksinja
- Vasili Kovrigin as Prokofij Melekhov
- Ivan Bykov as Garandza
- Leonid Yurenev as Gendarm
