= The Last Attraction =

1929 film

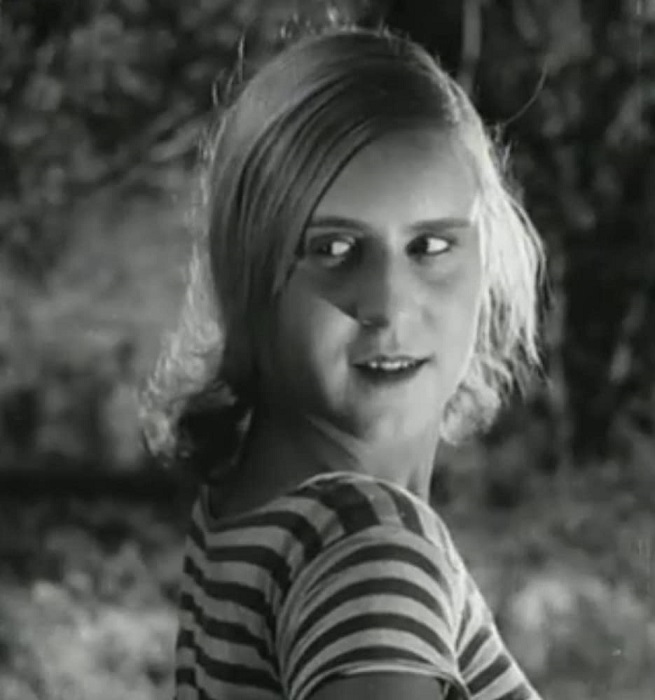
- Raisa Puzhnaya in the film "The Last Attraction"
- Russian: Последний аттракцион
- Directed by: Ivan Pravov; Olga Preobrazhenskaya
- Written by: Marietta Shaginyan (story); Viktor Shklovsky
- Starring: Ivan Bykov; Yelena Maksimova; Raisa Puzhnaya; Naum Rogozhin; A. Sashin; Leonid Yurenev
- Cinematography: Aleksej Solodkov; Anatoliy Solodkov
- Release date: 1929
- Country: Soviet Union
- Language: Russian

The Last Attraction (Russian: Последний аттракцион) is a 1929 Soviet film directed by Ivan Pravov and Olga Preobrazhenskaya.

The film tells of the entry into the Red Army of young tight-rope walkers, and their fight against the soldiers of the Denikin army.

== Plot ==
During the Russian Civil War, a circus troupe travels along the frontlines, performing for both the White Army and the Red Army.

One day, the situation changes dramatically: the circus is requisitioned and converted into a propaganda vehicle, with the performers placed under the control of the political department of the Red Army unit. Young tightrope walkers Serge and Masha, evaluating the political situation, voluntarily enlist in the Red Army and soon take part in battles against the forces of Anton Ivanovich Denikin.

== Cast ==
- Ivan Bykov as Kurapov
- Yelena Maksimova as Polly
- Raisa Puzhnaya as Masha
- Naum Rogozhin as Klim Visloguby
- A. Sashin as Serge
- Leonid Yurenev as Vanichka
