= Olga Preobrazhenskaya =

Olga Preobrazhenskaya may refer to:

- Olga Preobrajenska (1871–1962), Russian ballerina
- Olga Preobrazhenskaya (director) (1881–1971), Russian and Soviet actress and film director
