= Prohibited degree of kinship =

Blood relatedness that makes certain actions illegal

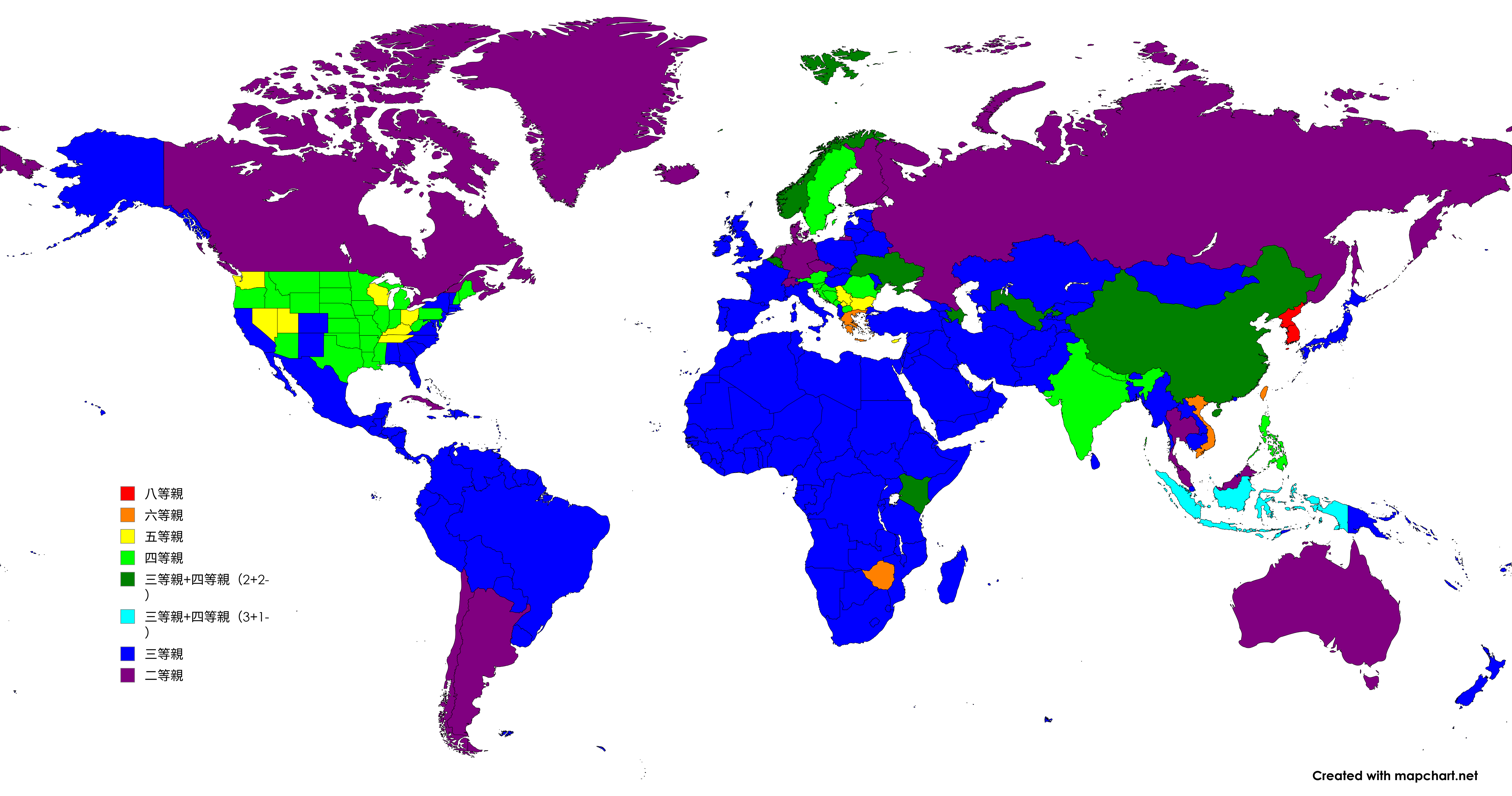
Prohibited degree of kinship of marriage (Roman law) (not under permission, not adopted, full-blood (not half-blood), opposite sex, both are under the age of 50, none is infertile, with no proof of genetic counseling from a genetic counselor): Within degree 8 (third cousin) Within degree 6 (second cousin) Within degree 5 (first cousin once removed) Within degree 4 (first cousin/granduncle-grandniece) Within degree 3 (uncle-niece), and for degree 4, first cousin is prohibited but granduncle-grandniece is not prohibited Within degree 3 (uncle-niece), and for degree 4, granduncle-grandniece is prohibited but first cousin is not prohibited Within degree 3 (uncle-niece), i.e. allow first cousin marriage and granduncle-grandniece marriage Within degree 2 (sibling), i.e. allow avunculate marriage (uncle-niece marriage)

In law, a prohibited degree of kinship refers to a degree of consanguinity (blood relatedness), or sometimes affinity (relation by marriage or sexual relationship) between persons that makes sex or marriage between them illegal.

An incest taboo between parent and child or two full-blooded siblings is a cultural universal. Taboos against sexual relations between individuals of other close degrees of relationship vary. The probable biological basis for the generality of the marital incest taboo is that matings between close relatives lead to progeny that tend to experience inbreeding depression, due largely to the increased expression of recessive deleterious mutations.

== Marital prohibitions ==
=== China (mainland) ===
The Civil Code of the People’s Republic of China Article 1048 stipulated that persons who are lineal relatives by blood, or collateral relatives by blood up to the third degree of kinship are prohibited from being married.

According to the official explanation, the calculation of degree of consanguinity in China is similar to Roman civil law with some difference. Aforementioned "collateral relatives by blood up to the third degree of kinship" include:

- full and half siblings
- uncles and niece; aunt and nephew
- first cousins (which is counted as fourth degree of kinship in Roman civil law tradition)

In Imperial China (221 BCE to 1912), marriage between first cousins was partially allowed. Marrying the child of one’s paternal aunt, maternal uncle, or maternal aunt was generally accepted in Chinese history during most of China’s dynastic era. However, among other exceptions, marrying the child of your paternal uncle was strictly prohibited, as such a marriage was seen as one between siblings as each of the couple bore the same family name.

=== Medieval canon law ===
Roman civil law prohibited marriages within four degrees of consanguinity. This was calculated by counting up from one prospective partner to the common ancestor, then down to the other prospective partner. The first prohibited degree of consanguinity was a parent-child relationship while a second degree would be a sibling relationship. A third degree would be an uncle/aunt with a niece/nephew while fourth degree was between first cousins. Any prospective marriage partner with a blood relationship outside these prohibited degrees was considered acceptable.

The Roman Catholic Church and Eastern Orthodox Church have a long history of marital prohibitions, called impediments to marriage, which limit the marriage of two closely related relatives. Initially, canon law followed Roman civil law until the early 9th century, when the Western Church increased the number of prohibited degrees from four to seven. The method of calculation was also changed to simply count the number of generations back to the common ancestor. This meant that marriage to anyone up to and including a sixth cousin was prohibited. The Fourth Lateran Council of 1215 decreed a change from seven prohibited degrees back to four (but retaining the same method of calculating; counting back to the common ancestor).

=== Australia ===
In Australia, the Marriage Act 1961 prohibits a marriage to a direct ancestor or descendant or sibling (whether full sibling or half sibling), including those arising from a legal adoption. Such marriages are void.

=== England, Wales and the Anglican Communion ===
The 1662 Book of Common Prayer of the Church of England, long used in various forms through a broad swathe of Anglicanism, included a Table of Kindred and Affinity listing the prohibited degrees of kinship within which one could not marry due to consanguinity or marital affinity. The list was enacted by the Marriage Act 1949 which with significant changes continues to apply in England and Wales. The list was cut back by the Marriage (Prohibited Degrees of Relationship) Act 1986, by deleting from the list prohibitions based on affinity relationships, and added to in other respects. Marriages that continue to be prohibited in England and Wales by the 1949 Act are as follows:

Prohibited to men	Prohibited to women
Mother	Father
Daughter	Son
Father's mother (grandmother)	Father's father (grandfather)
Mother's mother (grandmother)	Mother's father (grandfather)
Son's daughter (granddaughter)	Son's son (grandson)
Daughter's daughter (granddaughter)	Daughter's son (grandson)
Sister	Brother
Father's sister (aunt)	Father's brother (uncle)
Mother's sister (aunt)	Mother's brother (uncle)
Brother's daughter (niece)	Brother's son (nephew)
Sister's daughter (niece)	Sister's son (nephew)

The Children Act 1975 added the following prohibitions:

Prohibited to men	Prohibited to women
Adoptive mother or former adoptive mother	Adoptive father or former adoptive father
Adoptive daughter or former adoptive daughter	Adoptive son or former adoptive son

The Marriage Act 1949 also prohibited marriage to the following affinity relations, but these were repealed by the Marriage (Prohibited Degrees of Relationship) Act 1986:

Prohibited to men	Prohibited to women
Wife's mother	Husband's father
Wife's daughter	Husband's son
Father's wife	Mother's husband
Son's wife	Daughter's husband
Father's father's wife	Father's mother's husband
Mother's father's wife	Mother's mother's husband
Wife's father's mother	Husband's father's father
Wife's mother's mother	Husband's mother's father
Wife's son's daughter	Husband's son's son
Wife's daughter's daughter	Husband's daughter's son
Son's son's wife	Son's daughter's husband
Daughter's son's wife	Daughter's daughter's husband

The Marriage (Prohibited Degrees of Relationship) Act 1986 prohibits a marriage to the following, until both parties are aged 21 or over, and provided that the younger party has not at any time before attaining the age of 18 been a child of the family in relation to the other party:

Daughter of former wife	Son of former husband
Former wife of father	Former husband of mother
Former wife of father’s father	Former husband of father’s mother
Former wife of mother’s father	Former husband of mother’s mother
Daughter of son of former wife	Son of son of former husband
Daughter of daughter of former wife	Son of daughter of former husband

The Marriage (Prohibited Degrees of Relationship) Act 1986 also prohibits a marriage to the following:

Mother of former wife, until the death of both the former wife and the father of the former wife	Father of former husband, until after the death of both the former husband and the mother of the former husband
Former wife of son, until after the death of both his son and the mother of his son	Former husband of daughter, until after the death of both her daughter and the father of her daughter

The Marriage Act 1949 (Remedial) Order 2007 accepted the ruling of the European Court of Human Rights and removed the ban on marriage with a former mother-in-law/daughter-in-law.

=== South Africa ===
In South Africa, sexual relations are prohibited within the first degree of affinity, that is, where one person is the direct ancestor or descendant of the spouse of the other person.

=== Taiwan ===
Article 983 of the Civil Code stipulates that a person may not marry any of the following relatives:

(1) A lineal relative by blood or by marriage;

(2) A collateral relative by blood is within the sixth degree of relationship. The limit to marriage shall not be applicable to persons of lineal relative within the fourth degree of relationship and collateral relative within the sixth degree of relationship by adoption.

(3) A collateral relative by marriage is within the fifth degree of relationship of a different rank. The marriage prohibitions between relatives by marriage provided in the preceding paragraph shall continue to apply even after the dissolution of the marriage which has created the relationship. The limit to marriage with the lineal relative by blood or by marriage set forth in the first paragraph hereof shall be applicable to persons of lineal relative by adoption after ending of the adoption relationship.

The Judicial Yuan Interpretation No.32 and No. 91 allows marriage between siblings by adoption when the adoption was intended for the marriage. When the interpretation was made, it was not uncommon for parents to adopt a child so that their own child can marry the adopted child when both children have grown up.

Article 968 and 970 of the Civil Code states that "the degree of relationship by blood between a person and his lineal relative by blood shall be determined by counting the number of generations upwards or downwards from himself [as the case may be], one generation being taken as one degree. As between the person and his collateral relative, the degree of relationship shall be determined by the total number of generations counting upwards from himself to the common lineal ancestor and then from such common ancestor downwards to the relative by blood with whom the degree of relationship is to be determined." The line and degree of relationship between relatives by marriage shall be determined as follows:

(1) In regard to the spouse of a relative by blood, by the line and degree of relationship of the person who is married to the said spouse;

(2) In regard to a relative by blood of a spouse, by the line and the degree of relationship between such relative by blood and the said spouse;

(3) In regard to the person who is married to the relative by blood of his spouse, by the line and the degree of relationship between such person and the said spouse.

In short, a person can be considered as being "merged" with their spouse when counting degree of relationship.

=== United States ===
Laws regarding first-cousin marriage in the United States First-cousin marriage is legal Allowed with requirements or exceptions Banned with exceptions^{1} Statute bans first-cousin marriage^{1} Criminal offense^{1}^{1}Some states recognize marriages performed elsewhere, especially when the spouses were not residents of the state when married.

Thirty U.S. states prohibit most or all marriage between first cousins. Six states prohibit marriages between first cousins once removed. Some states that prohibit cousin marriage recognize cousin marriages performed in other states.

=== Russia ===
As of 2023, no formal federal law in the Russian Federation imposed any penalty for marriages between close relatives; however, in practice, it is hard, if not impossible, to get into such a marriage. Article 14 of the Family Code of the Russian Federation stipulates that marriages between close relatives (determined by a direct bloodline) are prohibited, but no penalty is specified. In modern Russia, it is also uncommon for first cousins to marry each other. The exact rules depend on the traditions of the concrete regions and may vary despite a formally written law. In legal practice as of 2022, at least in one case, the Russian Supreme Court nullified a marriage between a father and daughter.

Since the 13th century, a ban on marriages between close relatives has been formalized by the Russian Orthodox Church in the nomocanon, referred to as Kormchaia. Kormchaia stipulated written rules on how to determine which marriages were invalid. Generally, all marriages that resulted in crossing bloodlines were prohibited.

In terms of sexual relationships and intercourse in rural Russia, the practice of Snokhachestvo was widespread in the 16th and 18th centuries. Over time, it gradually waned because families became more nuclear.

Kormchaia was used up until 1810, when the Most Holy Synod issued a circular that temporarily liberalized rules. In practice, such rules were enforced loosely, if at all, and were easy to circumvent. The old believers didn't follow them either. Peasants often weren't educated enough to identify their relationships with others, so they married their relatives. Aristocracy wasn't excluded from marrying relatives: Alexander Herzen, a socialist writer of the 19th century of aristocratic origin, married his cousin, for example.

In Imperial Russia up until 1917, all marriages were mostly ceremonial and religious and were the only ones considered "legal" (no formally established institution existed at the time that could account for such marriages). Despite the power and strong opposition from the Russian Orthodox Church, in practice, marriages between first and second cousins were quite widespread among the Russian peasantry, according to one study. There were also cases of such marriages between the royal family and nobility during this time, with some marriages being nullified.

== Jury service ==
=== United States ===
Statutes in the U.S. state of Georgia disqualify a juror if that person is related "by consanguinity or affinity" to any party "within the sixth degree as computed according to the civil law".

Virginia rulings in Jaques v. Commonwealth, 51 Va. (10 Gratt.) 690 (1853), stated the long-standing, common-law rule disqualifying a venireman (juror) who is related, within the ninth degree of consanguinity or affinity, to a party to a suit.

== See also ==
- Affinity (law)
- Cousin marriage
- Inbreeding
- Mahram
