= A Nest of Noblemen =

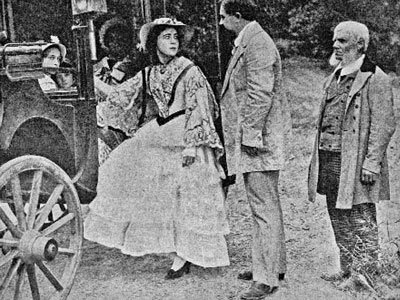
- Scene from A Nest of Noblemen
- Russian: Дворянское гнездо
- Directed by: Vladimir Gardin
- Written by: Ivan Turgenev
- Starring: Olga Preobrazhenskaya; Lyudmila Sychova; Mikhail Tamarov; Yelizaveta Uvarova
- Cinematography: Aleksandr Levitsky
- Release date: 1914
- Country: Russian Empire
- Language: Russian

A Nest of Noblemen (Russian: Дворянское гнездо) is a 1914 Russian drama film directed by Vladimir Gardin. It is based on the novel Home of the Gentry by Ivan Turgenev.

== Plot ==
This film is a film adaptation of the eponymous novel by Ivan Turgenev.

== Cast ==
- Olga Preobrazhenskaya
- Lyudmila Sychova
- Mikhail Tamarov
- Yelizaveta Uvarova
