= The Lonely White Sail =

1937 film by Vladimir Legoshin

- Russian: Белеет парус одинокий
- Directed by: Vladimir Legoshin
- Written by: Valentin Kataev
- Produced by: Vladimir Legoshin
- Cinematography: Grigori Garibyan; Bentsion; Monastyrsky
- Music by: Mikhail Raukhverger
- Release date: 1937
- Running time: 92 minute
- Country: Soviet Union
- Language: Russian

The Lonely White Sail (Russian: Белеет парус одинокий (Note: "Белеет парус одинокий" is the first line and the colloquial title of the poem The Sail by Mikhail Lermontov)) is a 1937 Soviet adventure film directed by Vladimir Legoshin based on the novel with the same Russian title by Valentin Kataev.

== Plot ==
The film shows the events that occurred in Odessa in 1905 after the suppression of the rebellion on the battleship Potemkin in front of the two boys.

== Cast ==
- Igor But as Gavrik, a boy
- Boris Runge as Pyetr "Petya" Bachei, a boy
- Aleksandr Melnikov as Rodion Zhukov (as A. Melnikov)
- Nikolai Plotnikov as The Plainclothes Agent of the Tsar
- A. Chekayevsky as Terentii
- Ivan Pelttser as Gavrik's Grandfather (as I. Pelttser)
- Fyodor Nikitin as Bachei, father (as F. Nikitin)
- Irina Bolshakova as Pavel "Pavlik" Bachei, a small boy
- Svetlana Pryadilova as Motya, Gavrik's cousin
- Daniil Sagal as Ilya Borisovich (as D. Sagal)
- Olga Pyzhova as Mme. Storozhenko
- Matvei Lyarov as Captain (as M. L. Lyarov)
- Pyotr Starkovsky as Unspecified Police Officer (as P. Starkovsky)
- Georgi Tusuzov
- Ivan Lyubeznov
