= Diamonds (1947 film) =

- Russian: Алмазы
- Directed by: Aleksandr Olenin; Ivan Pravov
- Written by: Viktor Shklovskiy; Aleksei Speshnyov; Izzat Sultanov; Uygun
- Starring: Razak Khamrayev; Asad Ismatov; Abid Dshalilov; Tamara Nazarova; Saat Talipov
- Cinematography: Aleksandr Sigaev
- Release date: 1947
- Country: Soviet Union

Diamonds, (Russian: Алмазы) is a 1947 Soviet drama film directed by Aleksandr Olenin and Ivan Pravov.

== Plot ==
The film tells about the geologist Sergey Nesterov, who, after completing his military service, plans to start again to search for industrial deposits of Ural diamonds. His zeal has no limits and he persists in realizing his goal

== Cast ==
- Vsevolod Sanaev as Sergei Nesterov
- Vasili Vanin as Ignat Salamatov
- Nina Alisova as Varvara Menshikova
- Yevgeniy Agurov
- Anastasiya Kozhevnikova
- Ioakim Maksimov-Koshkinskiy
- Lidiya Starokoltseva
