= Pyotr Starkovsky =

Russian actor (1884–1964)

- Born: Pyotr Ivanovich Starkovsky; 4 June 1884
- Died: 1 February 1964 (aged 79)
- Occupation: Actor
- Years active: 1917–1960

Pyotr Ivanovich Starkovsky (Russian: Петр Иванович Старковский; 4 June 1884 – 1 February 1964) was a Russian and Soviet stage and film actor.

== Life and career ==
From 1922 to 1924 he acted in the Moscow Revolution Theatre (current Mayakovsky Theatre), and from 1938 to 1959 in Maly Theatre.

== Selected filmography ==
- Old Man Vasily Gryaznov (1924) as Vasily Gryaznov
- Cross and Mauser (1925) as Priest
- The Lonely White Sail (1937) as Bailiff
- Encounter at the Elbe (1949) as Riile
- Devotion (1954) as Ivan Trofimovich Sheksnin, academician
- Yevgeniya Grande (1954) as Doctor

== Awards and honours ==
- Order of the Red Banner of Labour (26 October 1949)
- Honored Artist of the RSFSR (26 October 1949)
