= Women of Ryazan =

1927 film

- Directed by: Olga Preobrazhenskaya; Ivan Pravov (co-director)
- Written by: Boris Altshuler; Olga Vishnevskaya
- Starring: Kuzma Yastrebitsky; Olga Narbekova; Yelena Maksimova
- Cinematography: Konstantin Kuznetsov
- Music by: Sergey Dreznin
- Production company: Mezhrabpomfilm
- Release date: 13 December 1927
- Running time: 67 minutes
- Country: Soviet Union
- Languages: Silent; Russian intertitles
- Budget: 46,000 roubles
- Box office: 210,000 roubles

Women of Ryazan or The Peasant Women of Riazan (Russian: Бабы рязанские, romanized: Baby ryazanskie) is a 1927 Soviet silent drama film directed by Olga Preobrazhenskaya and co-directed by Ivan Pravov, starring Kuzma Yastrebitsky, Olga Narbekova and Yelena Maksimova. This is the fourth feature film Preobrazhenskaya directed. In this film, "she reveals her belief in the strength of a simple plot, and her penchant for portraying folk traditions and for conveying a sense of the beauty and freshness of her native countryside."

The picture compares the fate of two heroines Anna, who commits suicide at the end, and her lively and energetic sister-in-law Vasilisa, who openly defies the old way of life.

== Plot ==
Women of Ryazan (1927)

The film is set in a village somewhere in the Ryazan Governorate in Russia. It opens in Spring, 1914, just before the outbreak of the First World War. The well-to-do farmer Vasilii Shironin has a daughter, Vasilisa, and a son, Ivan. While Ivan's love towards Anna was by luck also Vasilii's choice for his bride, Vasilisa's love towards Nicolai was strongly opposed by Vasilii. Before the general mobilization in Russia, Ivan is married to Anna while Vasilisa leaves home to start her family with Nicolai without the formal marriage. Vasilisa and Nicolai openly defy the conservative villagers' gossiping. When the war breaks out in the summer, both Ivan and Nicolai were drafted.

Meanwhile, Vasilii rapes Anna after getting drunk, and a child is born during Ivan's absence. After the war, Nicolai comes back to the village while Ivan remains missing. Now we are in the post revolutionary era, when Vasilisa's standing is drastically improved. Her plan for an orphanage is approved by the mayor and a deserted mansion is assigned to her for that purpose. When Ivan's letter finally arrives, we learn that he has been a prisoner of war and will return home soon. Upon seeing Anna with a child, he is devastated and does nothing to soothe her. In shame Anna jumps into the river and drowns. When her body is brought back to the farm, Visilisa tells Ivan to ask his father about the real cause of this incident. She then carries the child away to her orphanage.

== Cast ==
- Kuzma Yastrebitsky as Vasilii Schironin
- Emma Tsesarskaya as Vasilisa, his daughter
- Georgi Bobynin as Ivan, his son
- Olga Narbekova as Matveena
- Raisa Puzhnaya as Anna
- E. Safonova as Anna's Aunt Alyona
- Yelena Maksimova as Lukerya, a widow
- M. Sabelyev as Nicolai, a blacksmith
- Gulya Korolyova
- Inna Fyodorova

== Reception ==
"Women of Ryazan enjoyed a considerable success both in the Soviet Union and abroad", according to Dictionary of Films.

Bryher praised Women of Ryazan as the most moral film she has ever seen.

== Home video ==
This was released as part of Flicker Alley's Early Women Filmmakers: An International Anthology as a dual format Blu-ray/DVD edition on 9 May 2017.

== Bibliography ==
- Christie, Ian & Taylor, Richard. The Film Factory: Russian and Soviet Cinema in Documents 1896-1939. Routledge, 2012.
- Jay Leyda. Kino: A History of the Russian and Soviet Film. George Allen & Unwin. 1960
- Bryher (1922). Film Problems Of Soviet Russia. Riant Chateau TERRITET Switzerland.
