= Sickle and Hammer (film) =

1921 film

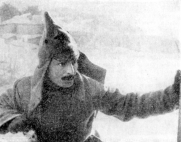
- Directed by: Vladimir Gardin
- Written by: Andrei Gorchilin; Feofan Shipulinsky
- Cinematography: Eduard Tisse
- Production company: VFKO
- Release date: 1921
- Country: Soviet Russia
- Languages: Silent; Russian intertitles

Sickle and Hammer (Russian: Серп и молот, romanized: Serp i molot) is a 1921 Russian silent drama film directed by Vladimir Gardin. It is an agit-film that is longer than the usual at six reels because the norm is two reels only or twenty minutes. The story is about a peasant worker who went to the city to become a factory worker, then he eventually fights in the World War and after this, he returns to his own village as a Red Army commander.

== Plot ==
Fleeing from the family of the wealthy peasant Kulak, the farm laborer Andrei, along with his beloved Agasha Gorbova and her brother Petr from a poor peasant family, moves to the capital, Moscow, in search of work. After securing a job, Andrei marries Agasha. However, World War I and then the October Revolution separate the couple for a long time.

== Cast ==
- Aleksandr Gromov as Ivan Gorbov
- Anatoli Gorchilin as Pyotr
- N. Zubova as Agasha
- Vsevolod Pudovkin as Andrey
- Sergey Komarov
- Ye. Bedunkevich
- N. Belyakov
- Anna Chekulaeva
- A. Golovanov
- Y. Kaverina
- M. Kudelko
- Feofan Shipulinsky
- N. Vishnyak

== Bibliography ==
- Sargeant, Amy. Vsevolod Pudovkin: Classic Films of the Soviet Avant-garde. I.B.Tauris, 2001.
