= Cross and Mauser =

1925 film

- Directed by: Vladimir Gardin
- Written by: Lev Nikulin
- Cinematography: Aleksandr Levitsky; Aleksandr Stanke; E. Stanke
- Production company: Goskino
- Release date: 8 November 1925
- Country: Soviet Union
- Languages: Silent; Russian intertitles

Cross and Mauser (Russian: Крест и Маузер, romanized: Krest i mauzer) is a 1925 Soviet silent adventure film directed by Vladimir Gardin.

The film set in early Soviet Russia, depicts a Catholic priest secretly working for foreign intelligence who is forced to confront his dark past and atone for his sins, leading to a tragic betrayal and death.

== Plot ==
Cross and Mauser (1925)

The film takes place during the early years of Soviet rule in a small town in western Russia. Hieronim, the priest of the local church, is secretly working for foreign intelligence, hiding a group of spies led by a former vicar Shur. One day, Hieronim unexpectedly encounters his old acquaintance, Mariyka, and tries to manipulate her into gathering information from the town's police chief, Galinski. Hieronim is aware of Mariyka’s past relationship with Galinski, having accidentally learned of it when he attempted to extract information from the arrested revolutionary Galinski before the revolution, under the guise of a confession.

However, Mariyka also knows something significant: during the pre-revolutionary years, in a monastery orphanage, a child was born to the orphan Yulka. The orphanage supervisor, Pavlikha, killed the child and disposed of the body in the Jewish quarter. The Black Hundreds used the rumor that the child was killed for ritualistic purposes by Jews to incite a pogrom. Yulka, dying, told her sister Mariyka that the father of the child was none other than Hieronim, the priest, who had ordered the child's death and used the pogrom to further his own career. Rather than agreeing to betray Galinski, Mariyka offers Hieronim a choice: to publicly atone for the death of the child.

During a sermon, Hieronim publicly confesses his sins and renounces his priestly vows. Following Shur's orders, the spy group douses Hieronim with kerosene and burns him alive. As Hieronim attempts to flee the church, which is surrounded by police, Shur, a former vicar of the monastery and now a spy, is fatally wounded but dies clutching a cross and a Mauser pistol.

== Cast ==
Note: all priests are Polish Catholic priests (ksiądz)

- V. Kiselyova as Pavlikha
- Vladimir Kriger, archbishop
- Nikolay Kutuzov, priest Hieronim Desnitski
- Nin Li as Mariyka
- Aleksey Pirogov as commissar Galinski
- Naum Rogozhin, vicar Shur
- Pyotr Savin as hooligan
- T. Sinitsyna as Yulka, sister of Mariyka
- Pyotr Starkovsky, priest

=== Supporting actors ===
- Yevgeni Chervyakov, priest
- Raisa Yesipova

== Bibliography ==
- Christie, Ian & Taylor, Richard. The Film Factory: Russian and Soviet Cinema in Documents 1896-1939. Routledge, 2012.
