= Beethoven Concerto =

1936 film

- Russian: Концерт Бетховена
- Directed by: Mikhail Gavronsky; Vladimir Schmidtgof
- Written by: Boris Starshov
- Starring: Mark Taimanov; Borya Vasilyev; Vladimir Gardin; Lyudmila Shabalina; Aleksandr Larikov; Aleksandr Melnikov
- Cinematography: L. Funshtein; V. Goryelik; A. Rogovsky
- Music by: Isaak Dunayevsky
- Release date: 1936
- Country: Soviet Union
- Language: Russian

Beethoven Concerto (Russian: Концерт Бетховена) is a 1936 Soviet film directed by Mikhail Gavronsky and Vladimir Schmidtgof.

Two gifted boys learn to play the violin with Professor Malevich, who prepares the boys for the All-Union competition.

== Plot ==
The film follows two musically gifted teenage boys from Belarus, Yanka Malevich and Vladik Korsak. Yanka’s father, a music teacher, trains both boys on the violin in preparation for an upcoming All-Union Music Competition in Moscow. However, a playful game of "Chapay" leads to an accident caused by Vladik, leaving Yanka with an injured hand. Angry at Vladik, the professor ends his lessons with him. Undeterred, the friends secretly continue practicing together, with Yanka sharing the insights from his father’s lessons. Vladik composes a cadenza for Beethoven’s concerto, while Yanka perseveres in playing despite his pain.

The boys travel to the competition, where unexpected challenges arise. Vladik, overwhelmed by nerves during his audition, fails to qualify. However, Yanka, who advances in the competition, performs Vladik's composition with his father's support. His brilliant execution earns him the title of laureate-performer, while Vladik becomes a laureate-composer. Through resilience and friendship, the boys overcome obstacles, proving their talent and determination.

== Music ==
The film introduced the popular Soviet song, Эх, хорошо в стране советской жить! ("Eh, How Wonderful It Is to Live in the Soviet Land!").

== Cast ==
- Mark Taimanov as Yanka Malevich
- Borya Vasilyev as Vladek Korsak
- Vladimir Gardin as Prof. Malevich
- Lyudmila Shabalina as Jenya
- Aleksandr Larikov as Korsak (as A. Larikov)
- Aleksandr Melnikov as Guide
