= Thought (film) =

- Russian: Мысль
- Directed by: Vladimir Gardin; Joseph Soiffer
- Written by: Vladimir Gardin; Leonid Andreyev (story)
- Starring: Gregori Chmara; N. Komarovskaya
- Release date: 1916
- Country: Russian Empire
- Language: Russian

Thought (Russian: Мысль) is a 1916 Russian silent film directed by Vladimir Gardin and Joseph Soiffer. The film is based on a story by Leonid Andreyev.

== Starring ==
- Gregori Chmara
- N. Komarovskaya
