= Stepan Razin (film) =

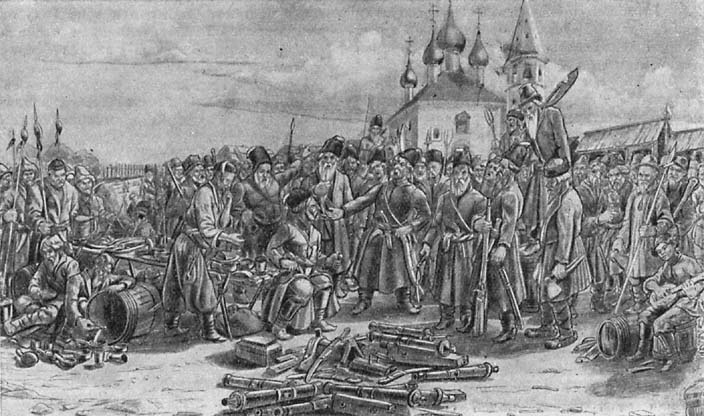
- Russian: Степан Разин
- Directed by: Ivan Pravov; Olga Preobrazhenskaya
- Written by: Aleksei Cheplygin
- Produced by: I. Kuznetsov
- Starring: Andrei Abrikosov; Vladimir Gardin; Elena Kondrateva
- Cinematography: Valentin Pavlov
- Edited by: G. Slavatinskaya
- Music by: Alexander Varlamov
- Production company: Mosfilm
- Release date: 1939
- Running time: 115 min.
- Country: Soviet Union
- Language: Russian

Stepan Razin (Russian: Степан Разин) is a 1939 Soviet historical drama film directed by Ivan Pravov and Olga Preobrazhenskaya.

== Plot ==
Don Cossack Stepan Razin vowed to take revenge on the boyars for his tortured friends. Having headed the risen peasants, he becomes the leader of the whole army. From all over the Russian land flock to him humiliated and offended.

== Cast ==
- Andrei Abrikosov as Stepan Bazin
- Vladimir Gardin as Kivrin
- Elena Kondratyeva as Alyona, Razina
- Pyotr Leontyev as Tsar Alexis of Russia
- Ivan Pelttser as Grandfather Taras
- Nina Zorskaya as Persian Princess
- Mikhail Zharov as Lazunka
- Sergey Martinson as Fyodor
