= The Iron Heel of Oligarchy =

- Directed by: Aleksandr Bashirov
- Screenplay by: Aleksandr Bashirov
- Cinematography: Vladimir Brylyakov; Sergei Lando
- Edited by: Olga Andrianova
- Music by: Evgeniy Fyodorov
- Release date: 5 September 1998 (Russia)
- Running time: 75 minutes
- Country: Russia
- Language: Russian

The Iron Heel of Oligarchy (Russian: Железная пята олигархии, romanized: Zheleznaya pyata oligarkhii) is a 1998 Russian drama film directed by and starring Aleksandr Bashirov. It tells the story of a man who tries to organise a revolution against the oligarchs in Russia. The film is loosely based on episodes from Jack London's 1907 novel The Iron Heel. It received a Tiger Award at the 1999 International Film Festival Rotterdam.

== Cast ==
- Aleksandr Bashirov as Nikolai Petrovich
- Evgeniy Fyodorov as Brother-in-arms
- Konstantin Fyodorov as Brother-in-arms
- Sergei Kagadeyev as Koordinator
- Aleksandr Voronov as Brother-in-arms

== See also ==
- The Iron Heel (film)
