= Emma Tsesarskaya =

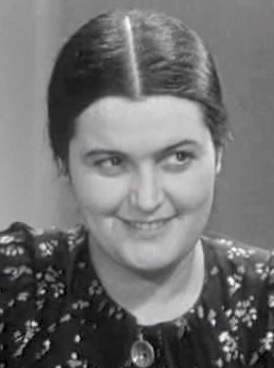
- Emma Tsesarskaya as Ivanova in A Girl with a Temper (1939)
- Born: 3 June 1909; Yekaterinoslav, Russian Empire
- Died: 28 February 1990 (aged 80)
- Other name: Emma Vladimirovna Tsesarskaya
- Occupation: Actress
- Years active: 1927-1963 (film)

Emma Tsesarskaya (1909–1990) was a Ukrainian Soviet stage and film actress.

== Selected filmography ==
- Women of Ryazan (1927)
- And Quiet Flows the Don (1930)
- Revolt of the Fisherman (1934)
- A Girl with a Temper (1939)
- The Liberated Earth (1946)

== Bibliography ==
- Eisner, Lotte H. The Haunted Screen: Expressionism in the German Cinema and the Influence of Max Reinhardt. University of California Press, 1969.
