= Pylyp Kozytskiy =

Ukrainian composer (1893–1960)

Pylyp Kozytskyi
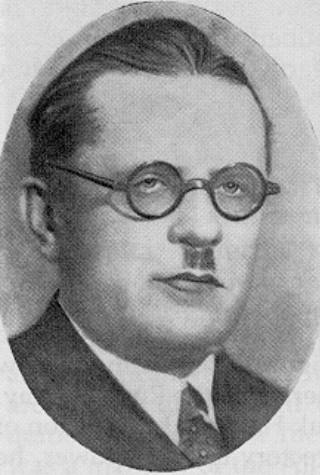
- Born: Pylyp Omelyanovych Kozytskyi; 23 October 1893; Letychivka, Kiev Governorate, Russian Empire
- Died: 27 April 1960 (aged 66); Kyiv, Ukrainian SSR, Soviet Union
- Resting place: Baikove Cemetery
- Occupations: Composer, music pedagogue
- Known for: Founder of the Leontovych Musical Society

Pylyp Omelyanovych Kozytskyi (Ukrainian: Пилип Омелянович Козицький; 23 October 1893 – 27 April 1960) was a Soviet and Ukrainian composer, musicologist, professor, head of the department of history of music at the Kyiv Conservatory, and Honored Art Worker of the Ukrainian SSR (1943).

Greatly influenced by expressionism, Kozytsky's musical works are a mixture of elements of Ukrainian folk music with social and patriotic characteristics, strongly rooted to the national school of classical music of Ukraine established by Mykola Lysenko.

== Life ==
Kozytskiy was born in Letychivka and studied at the Kyiv Theological Academy from 1917 and at the Kyiv Conservatory from 1920, under Boleslav Yavorsky and Reinhold Glière. Between 1918 and 1924, he taught at the Lysenko Music and Drama Institute in Kyiv, the Kharkiv Music and Drama Institute from 1925 to 1935, and the Kyiv Conservatory. From 1938 to 1941 he worked as artistic director for the Ukrainian State Philharmonic (during the German-Soviet war).

Kozytskyi's adopted daughter Gulya Korolyova was a popular child actress in the 1930s. After she died in action in 1942, she was glorified as one of the Soviet official martyrs for the Fatherland.

A founding member of the Leontovych Music Society, Kozytskyi was also head of the Union of Soviet Composers of Ukraine from 1952 to 1956, and president of the Choral Society of the Ukrainian SSR from 1959 up to his death in 1960. Kozytskiy died in Kyiv on 27 April 1960, and is buried in the Baikove Cemetery.

== Musical works ==
=== Operas ===
- Unknown Soldier (1934)
- Jean Giradin (1937)
- For the Fatherland (1943) - For symphony orchestra

=== Cantatas ===
- In memory of the Bolsheviks (1951) - For choir a cappella
- Hello, Spring (1952) - For children's choir

=== Symphony orchestra ===
- Kozak Holota (1925) - Suite
- Partisan's Daughter (1938) - Poem
- Variations on a theme of the folk song Kupala (1925) - For String Quartet
- Variations on a theme of the Bashkirs (1943)

=== Piano ===
- Pages of Childhood (1913)
- 7 Preludes - For voice and piano, with words by P. Tychyna, and R. Tagore

=== Choir ===
- Spring Oratorio (1921)
- Eight Preludes Songs (1924)
- Brave Navy (1925) - Diptych, with words by Pavlo Tychyna
- Eight Ukrainian folk stories (1936)
- We are the country of Soviet children (1952)
- Green kudryavchik (1954)

=== Romances ===
- Song of Yakir - With words by Volodymyr Sosiura

=== Music for plays ===
- The King is amused by Victor Hugo (1927) - For the Berezil Theater
- Sava Chalyi by Nikolai Gogol (1927) (Note: The legend of Cossack Captain Sava Chaly (executed in 1741 after serving as captain in the private army of the Polish noble family Czetwertyński), tells that his killing was ordered by his own father for betraying the Ukrainian cause.)
- Bridgehead by Miroslav Irchan (1932)

=== Music for movies ===
- Stozhary (1939)
- Kuban (1939)

== Literary works ==
- History of Ukrainian Music (Kyiv, 1922)
- The mass singing. Allowance for amateur choir (Kharkiv, 1927)
- Bedrich Smetana (Kyiv, 1949)
- Scientific studies and articles on the works of Mykola Leontovych, Kyrylo Stetsenko, Borys Lyatoshynsky, Bedřich Smetana and others. (Kyiv, 1952)
- Taras Shevchenko and musical culture (Kyiv, 1959)
- Singing and Music Academy in Kyiv in 300 years of its existence (Kyiv, 1971)
- The stepfather of the heroine of the Great Patriotic War Guli Queen

== Awards and honors ==
- Order of Lenin
- Order of the Red Banner of Labour (June 30, 1951)
- Honored Art Worker of the Ukrainian SSR (1943)
