= Gulya Korolyova =

Soviet actress

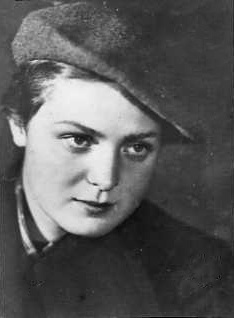
- Born: Marionella Vladimirovna Korolyova; 9 September 1922; Kyiv, Soviet Union
- Died: 23 November 1942 (aged 20) near Stalingrad, Soviet Union
- Occupation: Actress
- Years active: 1927–1936

Marionella Vladimirovna Korolyova (Russian: Марионелла Владимировна Королёва, nicknamed Gulya, 9 September 1922 – 23 November 1942) was a Soviet child actress. She was active in film in child roles between 1927 and 1936.

Her father was a journalist and a script writer active in the Komintern. After the divorce, he stayed in Moscow, while Gulya's mother moved to Kyiv with the daughter, and married the composer Pylyp Kozytskiy.

In the 1930s, Gulya married a nephew of the "people's enemy" Aleksei Pyatakov, and gave birth to a son. In 1940, she enrolled in the Hydromelioration Institute. In 1941, she enlisted in the Red Army following Operation Barbarossa and was killed during the Battle of Stalingrad. Her descendants currently reside in Kyiv.

In the 1960s she was made one of the official Soviet martyrs for the Fatherland. Several objects were named in her honor. She was also the central hero of Elena Ilyina's novel "The Fourth Height". As part of the de-Sovietization campaign in Ukraine, streets named in her honor were renamed in the 2020s, on the formal grounds that her activity was not related to Ukraine. In September 2022 a street that was named after Korolyova in Dnipro was renamed to honor American coloratura soprano of Ukrainian ethnicity Kvitka Cisyk.

== Select filmography ==
- Women of Ryazan (1927)
- Partisan's Daughter (1936)
- I Love (1936) (ru)
