= Pugachev (1937 film) =

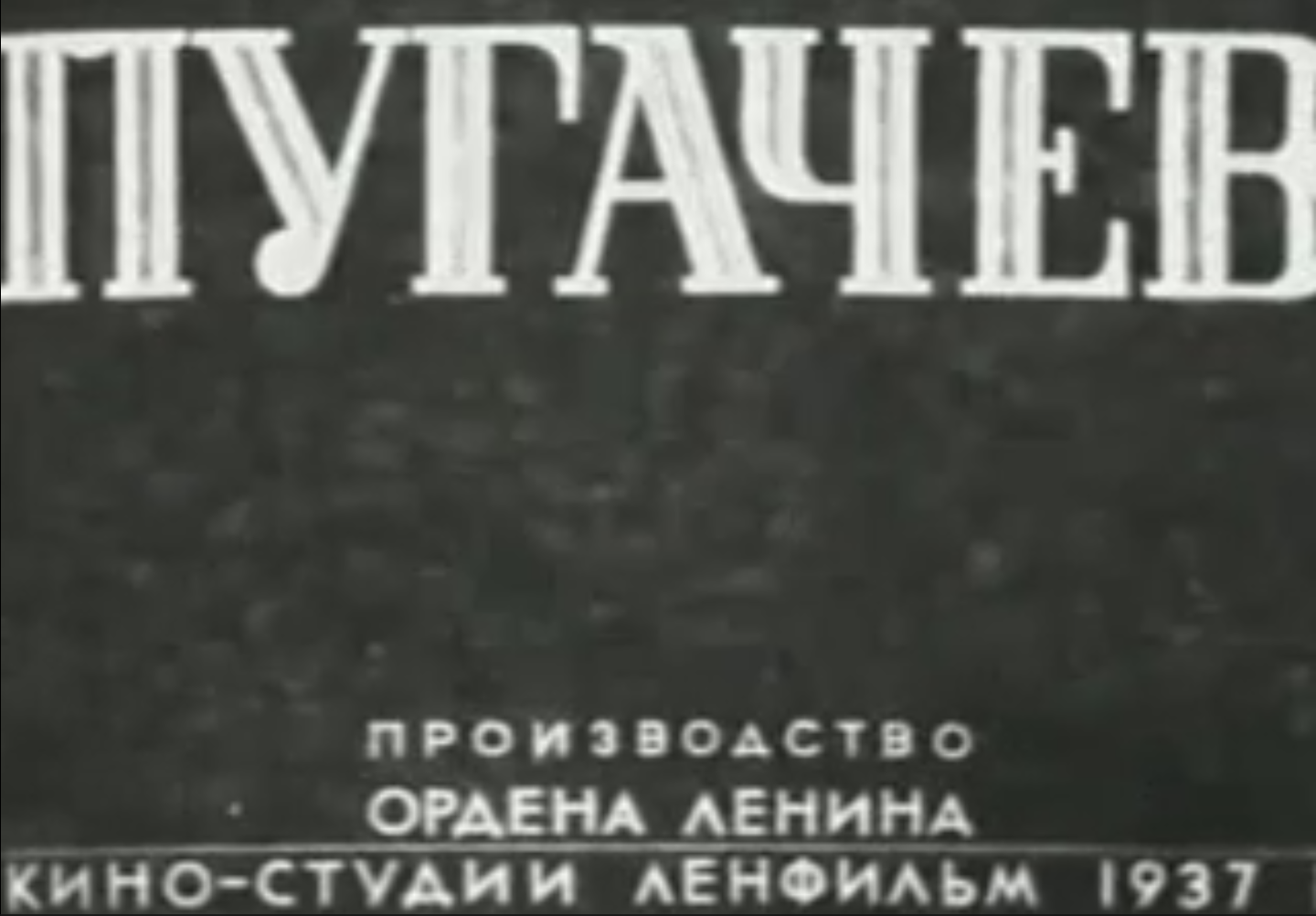
- Russian: Пугачёв
- Directed by: Pavel Petrov-Bytov
- Written by: Olga Forsch
- Produced by: L. Yanchenko
- Starring: Konstantin Skorobogatov; Kasim Mukhutdinov; Yakov Malyutin; Vladimir Gardin; Matvey Pavlikov
- Cinematography: Anatoly Nazarov
- Music by: Vissarion Shebalin
- Production company: Lenfilm
- Release date: 1937
- Running time: 101 min.
- Country: Soviet Union
- Language: Russian

Pugachev (Russian: Пугачёв, romanized: Pugachyov) is a 1937 Soviet biographical drama film directed by Pavel Petrov-Bytov.

Don Cossack Pugachev, leader of the Peasant war of 1773–1775 in Russia. Using rumors that the Emperor Peter III of Russia was alive, Pugachev called himself him; he was one of several dozen impostors posing as Peter, and the most famous of them.

== Plot ==
The film centers on the biography of Emelyan Ivanovich Pugachev, a key figure in one of Russia's largest peasant uprisings.

The story begins with a group of singing peasants being led under guard to a prison in Kazan, where Pugachev, a fugitive Don Cossack, discusses escape plans with fellow inmates. A nobleman, Volotskoy, and the elderly governor of Kazan arrive to select prisoners for forced labor in the Orenburg province. The governor targets one of his former serfs, Filimon, but after a heated confrontation, Filimon manages to escape. Pugachev decides it is time to plan his own escape.

Later, at a Kazan marketplace, Pugachev, under guard, begs for alms. In the town square, a peasant woman, Praskovya, is publicly punished for spreading rumors that Tsar Peter III survived his reported death. Amidst a commotion caused by Yaik Cossacks, both Pugachev and Praskovya manage to escape. Pugachev finds refuge among the Yaik Cossacks, who persuade him to assume the identity of the "surviving" Peter III and arrange his marriage to Ustinya Kuznetsova.

Gathering a force of Cossacks, Pugachev leads an attack on a fortress where Volotskoy is stationed. Although initially ambushed due to Volotskoy's cunning, Pugachev's impassioned speech turns the tide, convincing the garrison and Cossacks to join him. Volotskoy is spared and taken into Pugachev's service. With Volotskoy's strategies, Pugachev defeats Colonel Chernyshov, though Filimon remains suspicious of the nobleman.

Meanwhile, in the Zimoveyskaya stanitsa, Pugachev's wife, Sofya, learns of his uprising and decides to travel to Orenburg with Praskovya. The women arrive at Pugachev’s headquarters in Berdskaya Sloboda and witness a military review. Bashkir leader Salavat Yulaev swears allegiance to Pugachev, who celebrates with a feast in his "imperial" chambers. During the festivities, tensions rise as Volotskoy flirts with Ustinya, sparking Sofya's jealousy. Pugachev reconciles with Sofya, releases Ustinya, and focuses on his campaign.

Despite victories, Pugachev’s siege of Orenburg falters. Volotskoy betrays him and escapes to Kazan. As government forces close in, Pugachev retreats to the Bashkir steppes. A rift develops within his ranks when Salavat's raids on Russian settlements provoke conflict. Pugachev quells the discord and leads his forces toward Kazan.

In Kazan, Sofya and her children are captured but refuse to reveal Pugachev’s identity. Filimon infiltrates the city and attempts to rally support for Pugachev but is forced to flee. Pugachev storms Kazan, freeing his family and allowing Praskovya to take revenge on a former tormentor. However, internal divisions persist—Salavat departs, and Pugachev executes Volotskoy for treachery.

As government forces approach, Pugachev suffers defeat at Kazan. He retreats across the Volga, but his family is captured. Weakened and with his followers dwindling, Pugachev confronts dissent among his Cossack leaders. Filimon overhears a plot to betray Pugachev, but he is discovered and injured. Before the conspirators can act, Pugachev arrives, only to be overpowered and handed over to the authorities.

The film concludes with Pugachev’s execution in Moscow. Among the onlookers are Filimon, Sofya with her eldest son, and Tvorogov, one of the conspirators.

== Cast ==
- Konstantin Skorobogatov as Yemelyan Pugachev
- Kasim Mukhutdinov as Salawat Yulayev
- Yakov Malyutin as Volotskoy
- Vladimir Gardin as Secreatary of the Senate
- Matvey Pavlikov as Filimon
- V. Usenko as Ivan Tvorogov
- Yelena Karyakina as Sofya
- Yelena Maksimova as Praskovya
- Vladimir Taskin as Sokolsky
- Ivan Sizov as Chika
- Nina Latonina as Ustiniya
- Vasily Chudakov as Chumakov
- Vladimir Uralsky as Khlopusha

== Sae also ==
- Pugachev's Rebellion
