= The Iron Heel =

1908 novel by Jack London

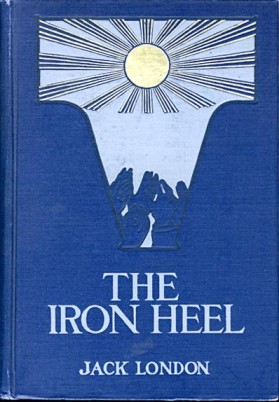
- Cover of the first edition
- Author: Jack London
- Language: English
- Genre: Dystopian novel Political novel Social science fiction
- Published: February 19, 1908 (Macmillan)
- Publication place: United States
- Media type: Print (hardcover)
- Pages: 354

The Iron Heel is a dystopian novel by American writer Jack London. Published in 1908, it recounts a tumultuous period in the first half of 20th-century America in which a rising socialist movement threatens to win national elections and take power, but then is crushed by a corporate-controlled oligarchy known as the "Iron Heel". The events in the book are told via a long-lost manuscript, written by the wife of a key socialist leader, that is discovered and analyzed centuries later.

In addition to inspiring future political novels such as It Can't Happen Here by Sinclair Lewis and Nineteen Eighty-Four by George Orwell, The Iron Heel has been cited as an early example of social science fiction.

== Synopsis ==
The novel opens with a Foreword by Anthony Meredith, a historian circa 2600 AD or 419 B.O.M. (the Brotherhood of Man). A fragmentary manuscript has just been discovered in the hollow of an oak tree. It is a diary written by Avis Everhard and chronicles the years 1912 through 1932. Meredith is preparing the Everhard Manuscript for publication by correcting factual errors and adding footnotes. His Foreword serves as a framing device. It tells the reader what has transpired in the nearly seven centuries since the events described in the manuscript, but also reveals that the early 20th-century protagonists failed in their revolutionary efforts, giving The Iron Heel an air of foreordained tragedy.

The story proper begins in Chapter 1 with the text of the manuscript itself. It is narrated by Avis Cunningham, daughter of renowned physicist John Cunningham, and future wife of socialist leader Ernest Everhard. At first, she disagrees with Ernest's assertion that the capitalist system is based on exploitation of labour. She proceeds to investigate the conditions that workers live in, and what she learns causes her to change her mind and accept Ernest's worldview. Similarly, Bishop Morehouse does not initially believe in the horrors depicted by Ernest; however, the Bishop becomes convinced of their truth and is confined to a madhouse for his radical ideas.

During the timespan covered by the manuscript, the Oligarchy (or "Iron Heel") arises in the United States. Meanwhile, Japan conquers East Asia and creates its own empire; India gains independence; and Europe becomes socialist. Canada, Mexico, and Cuba form their own Oligarchies and are aligned with the U.S. (the manuscript does not delve into details about the events occurring in other countries).

The Oligarchy is the largest monopoly of trusts (or robber barons) who manage to squeeze out the American middle class by bankrupting most small to mid-sized businesses, and reducing farmers to serfdom. Laborers in essential industries like steel and rail are elevated and given decent wages, housing, and education. Indeed, the tragic turn in the novel (and Jack London's warning to his contemporaries) is the treachery of these favored unions, who break with other unions and side with the Oligarchy. Further, a military caste is formed: the Mercenaries. They are officially the army of the U.S. but are in fact in the employ of the Oligarchs.

Asgard is the name of a fictional wonder-city, constructed by the Oligarchy to be admired and appreciated as well as lived in. Thousands of proletarians dwell in abject poverty there, and are used whenever a public work needs to be completed, such as the building of a levee or canal.

Avis interjects her political opinions in the manuscript. For example, she insists that the Oligarchs do not rely strictly on police and military force to stay in power; they have also positioned themselves as models of rectitude and maintainers of civilization:

I cannot lay too great a stress upon this high ethical righteousness of the whole oligarch class. This has been the strength of the Iron Heel, and too many of the comrades have been slow or loath to realize it. Many of them have ascribed the strength of the Iron Heel to its system of reward and punishment. This is a mistake.... Prisons, banishment and degradation, honors and palaces and wonder-cities, are all incidental. The great driving force of the oligarchs is the belief that they are doing right.

In North America, the Oligarchy lasts for three centuries until the Revolution eventually triumphs and ushers in the Brotherhood of Man. The manuscript describes the First Revolt, and the preparations for the Second Revolt. At the point in 1932 when the manuscript abruptly ends, Avis is confident that the imminent Second Revolt will succeed. But Meredith's Foreword tells the reader that her wish will go unfulfilled until centuries after her death.

== Publication history and reception ==
London finished writing The Iron Heel in late 1906. He hoped to serialize it and earn as much as $10,000, but the novel was rejected by every major magazine. To drum up interest, he held a public reading in Berkeley in March 1907, at which he read two chapters from his unpublished novel. The Iron Heel was finally accepted for publication by the Macmillan Company and released in February 1908. The only manuscript change that Macmillan chairman George P. Brett requested was the deletion of a Meredith footnote that could have potentially brought a libel lawsuit against Brett and London.

The novel sold 50,000 copies in hardcover but generally did not earn the praise of critics at the time. A reviewer in The Outlook concluded that "as a work of fiction it has little to commend it, and as a socialist tract it is distinctly unconvincing". The Baltimore Sun called it "a compilation of socialist theories and arguments. The love story that runs through it is a mere thread that serves to string together the incidents and arguments.... When so well known a socialist agitator and writer as London prophesies a bloody war to overturn existing governments and in a thinly veiled romance practically justifies the spoliation of private and corporation property, violence and assassination, it makes one question the policies and purposes of the socialists."

The Iron Heel created a stir among leftists. It was denounced by reformist socialist leaders for spreading pessimism, but then it was given a boost by the outbreak of World War I. A new edition came out in 1924 with a glowing introduction by author Anatole France, who said that as a result of the war, "international Oligarchy itself has been shaken, and the day is drawing near when it will crumble down upon a ruined Europe." France added that when The Iron Heel was first published, "London was shouted at as a frightful pessimist. Even sincere socialists blamed him for casting terror into the party ranks. They were wrong; those who have the precious and rare gift of foreseeing the future are bound to reveal the dangers it presents."

In 1937, Jack London's daughter Joan sent a copy of the novel to exiled Russian revolutionary Leon Trotsky, who was living in Mexico. He read it and was deeply impressed by its prescience. He wrote in his reply to Joan London:

[S]till more astonishing is the genuinely prophetic vision of the methods by which the Iron Heel will sustain its domination over crushed mankind.... Over the mass of the deprived rise the castes of labor aristocracy, of praetorian army, of an all-penetrating police, with the financial oligarchy at the top. In reading it one does not believe his own eyes: it is precisely the picture of fascism, of its economy, of its governmental technique, its political psychology! The fact is incontestable: in 1907 Jack London already foresaw and described the fascist regime as the inevitable result of the defeat of the proletarian revolution.

In the mid-20th century, the novel started to receive favorable attention in the science fiction press:

- Review by Damon Knight in If, December 1958
- Review by Angus Taylor (as Angus M. Taylor) in Janus, Winter 1977
- Uncredited review in Reclams Science Fiction Führer (1982) (in German)
- Review by Joseph Nicholas in Paperback Inferno, no. 58 (1986)
- Review by Marek Oramus in Fenix, no. 4 (1990), pp. 139–144 (in Polish)
- Review by Everett F. Bleiler in Science Fiction: The Early Years (1991)

In The Novels of Jack London: A Reappraisal (1983), Charles N. Watson labeled The Iron Heel "a minor revolutionary classic", not a major one. He claimed that "London seems to have written too much out of his heart, too little out of his head." Watson criticized the characterization of Avis Everhard because it asks the reader to accept "the existence of two Avises simultaneously—the fluttery young woman of the love adventure and the hardened revolutionary of the political drama."

There were new reassessments of The Iron Heel on its 100th anniversary.

== Analysis ==
The book is said to have prefigured the genres of dystopian fiction and social science fiction, as employed later by novels such as We, Brave New World, A Canticle for Leibowitz, and The Handmaid's Tale. Erich Fromm stated that The Iron Heel, with its "prediction of fascism in America, is the earliest of the modern negative Utopias."

The work is unusual among London's writings (and among the literature of its era) for being a first-person narrative of a woman protagonist written by a man.

Critics have noted the novel's use of various literary devices—including a frame story, a "found manuscript", and nested points of view with two somewhat unreliable narrators—to add complexity to the storytelling. The outer point of view is provided by Meredith, a scholar of history who presents himself as a trusted authority, but his commentary about 20th-century events is occasionally inaccurate, which undermines his credibility. The next point of view is provided by Avis Everhard and her diary entries, but her adulation for her husband and her caustic political opinions call into question her reliability and objectivity. As Jeffrey Somers writes, "The Iron Heel contains two intertwined, multilayered false documents (Avis' manuscript and Meredith's gloss on that manuscript)." This combination creates mystery as to whose perspective is closest to the truth.

== Influences and effects ==
The Iron Heel is cited by George Orwell's biographer Michael Shelden as having influenced Nineteen Eighty-Four. Orwell praised London for his "very remarkable prophecy of the rise of Fascism" and believed that London's understanding of the primitive made him a more savvy predictor of the future "than many better-informed and more logical thinkers." Nineteen Eighty-Four protagonist Winston Smith, like Avis Everhard, keeps a diary where he writes down his rebellious thoughts and experiences. However, while Everhard's diary remained hidden during the centuries of tyranny to be discovered and published later, Smith's diary falls into the hands of the Thought Police, whose interrogator tells Smith not to expect posterity to vindicate him: "Posterity will never hear of you. You will be lifted clean out from the stream of history." Orwell said that "London's main achievement was to foresee, some twenty years before the event, that the menaced capitalist class would counter-attack and not quietly die because the writers of Marxist textbooks told it to die."

When tracing the origins of his radical politics, labor leader Harry Bridges recalled that he had been "set afire" by Jack London's The Sea-Wolf and The Iron Heel.

In a review of Kurt Vonnegut's debut novel Player Piano (1952), Granville Hicks compared it to The Iron Heel: "[W]e are taken into the future and shown an America ruled by a tiny oligarchy, and here too there is a revolt that fails."

Portions of Chapter 7 of The Iron Heel, "The Bishop's Vision", are an almost verbatim copy of an ironic essay by Irish-American writer Frank Harris. London did not deny he copied the essay, but he claimed that he believed it was a speech delivered by an actual bishop.

== Adaptations ==
The novel has been adapted into two Russian films: The Iron Heel (1919) and The Iron Heel of Oligarchy (1999). The first was produced in the immediate aftermath of the October Revolution, and the second was produced when real-life Oligarchs came to dominate the economy of post-Soviet Russia.

A stage adaptation by Edward Einhorn was produced in 2016 in New York. According to The New York Times, "it serves up food for thought with an appealing heart-on-sleeve warmth".

== See also ==
- Business Plot – an alleged 1933 conspiracy by businessmen to overthrow the U.S. government in reaction to New Deal economic reforms.
