= Gold Reserves (film) =

1925 film

- Directed by: Vladimir Gardin
- Written by: Boris Leonidov
- Cinematography: Eduard Tisse
- Production company: Goskino
- Release date: 15 August 1925
- Country: Soviet Union
- Languages: Silent; Russian intertitles

Gold Reserves (Russian: Золотой Запас, romanized: Zolotoy zapas) is a 1925 Soviet silent adventure film directed by Vladimir Gardin. The picture is considered lost.

== Plot ==
The film is about the struggle between the Bolshevik underground and Red partisans in the rear of the frontier of the Kolchak troops, which ended in an attack on the enemy train, capture by the Kolchak unit and discovery of the carefully guarded gold reserves.

== Cast ==
- Yevgeni Chervyakov as Zajtsev
- Andrey Fayt
- Galina Kravchenko
- Leonid Yurenev

== Bibliography ==
- Wolfgang Beilenhoff. Poetika Kino: Theorie und Praxis des Films im russischen Formalismus. Suhrkamp, 2005.
