= The Liberated Earth =

- Directed by: Aleksandr Medvedkin
- Written by: Zinaida Markina; Dmitri Tarasov
- Starring: Vera Altayskaya; Aleksandr Khvylya; Emma Tsesarskaya; Vasili Vanin
- Music by: Semyon Pototsky
- Production company: Sverdlovsk Film Studio
- Distributed by: Sovexport
- Release date: 1946
- Country: Soviet Union
- Language: Russian

The Liberated Earth (Russian: Освобождённая земля, romanized: Osvobozhdyonnaya zemlya) is a 1946 Soviet war drama film directed by Aleksandr Medvedkin and starring Vera Altayskaya, Aleksandr Khvylya and Emma Tsesarskaya. The film was made at the Sverdlovsk Film Studio.

== Plot ==
1943. The Red Army pushes the Germans out of Kuban. As the front moves forward, the landowners follow, returning to the liberated villages and settlements.

The women return to their native ashes, with only the elderly Fyodor Mulyuk and a few boys remaining. The settlement is almost completely destroyed, and the sly chairman Kovrigin from a neighboring collective farm takes advantage of the situation, inviting them to work for him during the planting season. However, the villagers refuse, understanding that doing so would mean leaving their ancestral homes forever.

On the very first day, the villagers unanimously elect Nadya Pritulyak, a former partisan and wife of the old chairman who stayed at the front, as the new chairman of the collective farm. They decide to name the collective farm "Revival." The women rebuild homes, gather tools, mow, clean, and work hard. A young boy, Vasya, a second-class tractor driver, brings an abandoned German tankette to life to use it as a tractor to plow the fields.

Kovrigin calls the district executive committee chairman Kosteko, hoping that he will see the villagers' unpreparedness for the planting season and send them to his farm instead. When the chairman arrives, the villagers greet him proudly, not showing their hardships but demonstrating their capability to restore the settlement. Old Mulyuk even presents a bottle of wine he had saved for a meeting with his son returning from the war. Seeing their efforts, Kosteko decides to support the revival of the settlement.

In the fall, the villagers harvest their first crop on the liberated land, and in the spring, they greet the returning soldiers who come home with victory.

== Cast ==
- Vasili Vanin as Mulyuk (as V. Vanin)
- Emma Tsesarskaya as Nadezhda Pritulyak
- Sergei Kalinin as Kovrygin (as S. Kalinin)
- Aleksandr Khvylya as Kostenko (as A. Khvylya)
- Aleksandr Denisov as Foma (as A. Denisov)
- Vera Altayskaya as Tanya (as V. Altayskaya)
- Nina Dintan as Darya (as N. Dintan)
- Anastasiya Kozhevnikova as Collective farmer (uncredited)
- Mariya Sapozhnikova as Collective Farmer (uncredited)
- M. Shlenskaya as Collective farmer (uncredited)
- Ekaterina Sipavina as Collective farmer (uncredited)

== Bibliography ==
- Liehm, Mira & Liehm, Antonín J. The Most Important Art: Eastern European Film After 1945. University of California Press, 1977.
