= The Iron Heel (film) =

1919 film directed by Vladimir Gardin

- Directed by: Vladimir Gardin
- Written by: Vladimir Gardin; Jack London (novel)
- Cinematography: Grigori Giber; Aleksandr Levitsky
- Production company: VFKO
- Release date: 7 November 1919
- Country: Soviet Russia
- Languages: Silent; Russian intertitles

The Iron Heel (Russian: Железная пята, romanized: Zheleznaya pyata) is a 1919 Soviet silent film directed by Vladimir Gardin. It is based on Jack London's 1908 novel The Iron Heel.

The main theme of London's book was the rise of a mass Socialist movement in the United States, with the potential to take power and implement a radical Socialist program, and its suppression by a well-organized coup of conservative Oligarchs. This had direct relevance to the situation in Russia at the time when the film was made, when the Russian Civil War was still raging and the newly created Soviet regime, born of the October Revolution, was still threatened by the counter-revolutionary White armies.

== Cast ==
- Olga Bonus
- Anatoli Gorchilin
- Aleksandra Khokhlova
- Ivan Khudoleyev
- Leonid Leonidov
- Olga Preobrazhenskaya
- Nina Shaternikova
- Nikolai Znamensky

== See also ==
- The Iron Heel of Oligarchy

== Bibliography ==
- Christie, Ian & Taylor, Richard. The Film Factory: Russian and Soviet Cinema in Documents 1896–1939. Routledge, 2012.
