= A Girl with a Temper =

A Girl with Character
- Directed by: Konstantin Yudin
- Written by: Gennadi Fish; Iosif Sklyut
- Starring: Valentina Serova; Emma Tsesarskaya; Andrei Tutyshkin; Pavel Olenev; Pyotr Repnin; Vsevolod Sanayev
- Cinematography: Timofei Lebeshev
- Edited by: Lev Felonov
- Music by: Daniil Pokras; Dmitri Pokras
- Production company: Mosfilm
- Release date: 1939
- Running time: 87 minutes
- Country: Soviet Union
- Language: Russian

A Girl with Character (Russian: Девушка с характером, romanized: Devushka s kharakterom) is a 1939 Soviet comedy film directed by Konstantin Yudin.

The film featured acting debuts of Mikhail Gluzsky and Anatoly Solovyov.

== Plot ==
The best farm worker Katya Ivanova travels to the district center, in search of truth and the possibility of punishing the director-bureaucrat Meshkov, who collapsed the once prosperous work in the Far East animal-breeding sovkhoz. On the way to the station, Katya manages to catch and hand over a saboteur to the border guards. She then rides the train without a ticket to write a complaint, which means that she has to work as a waitress in the dining car on the way to Moscow.

On the train, Katya meets a sailor Sergei, but upon arrival in Moscow they lose each other. Katya is employed as a saleswoman in a fur shop and after that at a factory of gramophone records. At the same time she actively convinces female colleagues to go to the Far East.

For a long time Sergei looks for Katya and he finally finds her. Meanwhile, Katya's complaint is examined. Meshkov is dismissed and Katya is appointed as the new director of the farm. Katya and Sergei go to the Far East.

== Cast ==
- Valentina Serova as Katya Ivanova, worker of the Far-East animal-breeding sovkhoz
- Emma Tsesarskaya as Ekaterina Ivanova, wife of the commander
- Andrei Tutyshkin as Sergei Beryozkin, sailor
- Pavel Olenev as Bobrik, director of the fur store
- Pyotr Repnin as Tsvetkov, director of the gramophone record factory
- Vsevolod Sanayev as Surkov, lieutenant of the militsiya
- Aleksandr Antonov as Mehkov, director of the animal-breeding sovkhoz
- Aleksandr Zhukov as train conductor
- Sergei Blinnikov as manager of the dining car
- Karandash as waiter
- Mikhail Gluzsky as border patrol officer
- Anatoly Solovyev as red army officer
- Nikolai Arskiy as employee of the commissariat
- Vladimir Dorofeev as huntsman
- Nikita Kondratyev as photojournalist
- Galina Kravchenko as mother of a lost child
- Ivan Lobyzovskiy as komsomol leader of the gramophone factory
- Iona Biy-Brodskiy as the lover of beer in the dining car

== Interesting Facts ==
- Filming of one scene took place on the Kratovskaya children's railway.
- The film marks the first appearance of the famous song "To the Far East" (music by the Pokrass brothers, lyrics by Eugene Dolmatovski) by Emma Tsesarskaya and Valentin Serov. The tune "Brown Buttons" was based on the themes of this song.
