= Władysław Abraham =

Polish lawyer, historian (1860–1941)

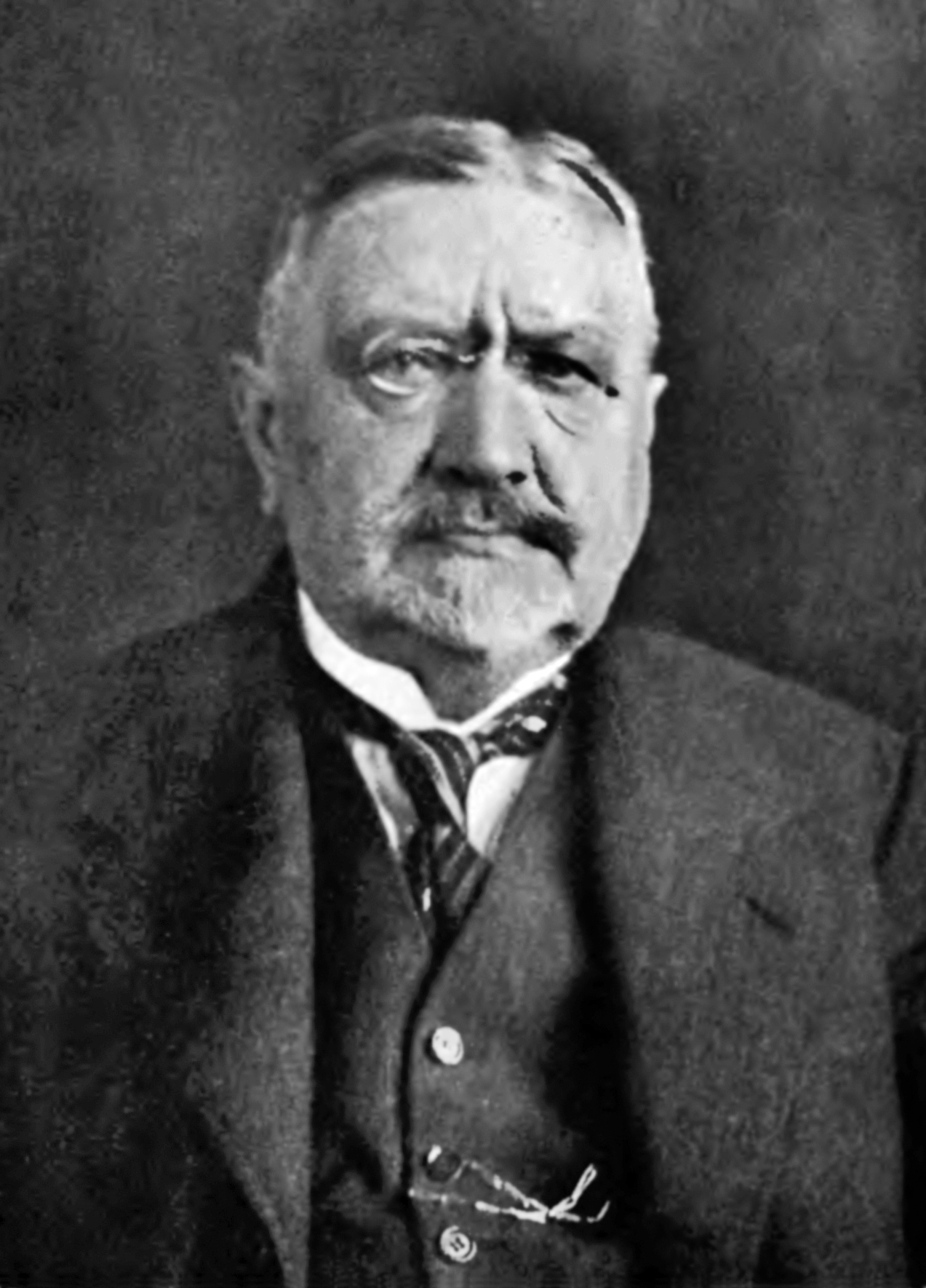
Władysław Abraham

Władysław Henryk Franciszek Abraham, a Polish lawyer and scientist, was born on 10 October 1860 in Sambor. A graduate of law and philosophy departments of the Jagiellonian University in Kraków, he was a specialist in Canon law. After habilitation at the Berlin University, he took up a job at the University of Lviv, later becoming a rector of the school.

Abraham was a member of several prestigious organizations, such as Polish Academy of Sciences and Lwow's Science Society. He participated in creation of a Concordat between Second Polish Republic and the state of Vatican, also co-created Polish family law. On 16 January 1931 the University of Poznan awarded him the title of doctor honoris causa. His son, General Roman Abraham, was commandant of the Greater Poland Cavalry Brigade during the Polish September Campaign.

Wladyslaw Abraham died in Lwow on 15 October 1941.
