= Taimanov Variation =

The Taimanov Variation can refer to variations of four different chess openings, all named after Mark Taimanov:

- In the Sicilian Defense, 1.e4 c5 2.Nf3 e6 3.d4 cxd4 4.Nxd4 Nc6
- In the Nimzo-Indian Defense, 1.d4 Nf6 2.c4 e6 3.Nc3 Bb4 4.e3 Nc6
- In the Modern Benoni, 1.d4 Nf6 2.c4 c5 3.d5 e6 4.Nc3 exd5 5.cxd5 d6 6.e4 g6 7.f4 Bg7 8.Bb5+
- In the Grünfeld Defense, 1.d4 Nf6 2.c4 g6 3.Nc3 d5 4.Bg5
