= Vladimir Gardin =

Russian and Soviet filmmaker

- Владимир Гардин
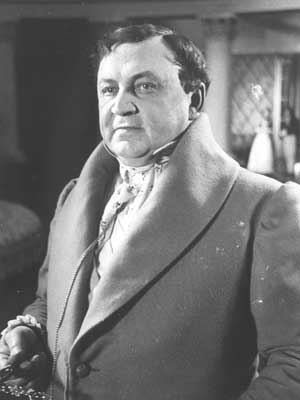
- Born: Vladimir Rostislavovich Blagonravov; January 18, 1877; Tver, Russian Empire
- Died: May 28, 1965 (aged 88); Leningrad, Russian SFSR, Soviet Union
- Occupations: Film director, screenwriter, actor
- Years active: 1913–1965

Vladimir Rostislavovich Gardin (Note: Russian: Владимир Ростиславович Гардин, romanized: Vladimir Rostislavovich Gardin) January 18 1877 [O.S. January 6] – 28 May 1965, born Blagonravov) (Note: Russian: Благонравов, romanized: Blagonravov) was a pioneering Russian film director and actor who strove to raise the artistic level of Russian cinema.

He first gained renown as a stage actor in the adaptations of Russian classics by Vera Komissarzhevskaya and other directors. In 1913, he turned to cinema and started producing screen versions of great Russian fiction: Anna Karenina (1914), The Kreutzer Sonata (1914), A Nest of Noblemen (1914), War and Peace (1915, co-directed with Yakov Protazanov), and On the Eve (1915).

After the Russian Revolution of 1917, he organized and presided over the first film school in the world, now known as VGIK. With the advent of sound pictures, he stopped directing and returned to acting. His roles won him a high critical acclaim and the title of People's Artist of the USSR (1947). Gardin published two volumes of memoirs in 1949 and 1952. Another book, The Artist's Life and Labor, followed in 1960.

== Selected filmography ==
=== Director ===
- The Keys to Happiness (1913); co-directed with Yakov Protazanov
- Days of Our Life (1914)
- Anna Karenina (1914)
- The Kreutzer Sonata (1914)
- A Nest of Noblemen (1914)
- War and Peace (1915)
- Petersburg Slums (1915); co-directed with Yakov Protazanov
- Ghosts (1915)
- Thought (1916)
- The Iron Heel (1919)
- Hunger... Hunger... Hunger (1921)
- Sickle and Hammer (1921)
- A Spectre Haunts Europe (1923)
- Locksmith and Chancellor (1923)
- Cross and Mauser (1925)
- Gold Reserves (1925)
- The Marriage of the Bear (1926)
- The Poet and the Tsar (1927)
- Kastus Kalinovskiy (1928)

=== Actor ===
- Sniper (1931)
- Beethoven Concerto (1936)
- Pugachev (1937)
- Stepan Razin (1939)
- Russian Ballerina (1947)

== Memory ==
In 1968 a memorial plaque was erected in Saint Petersburg (Potemkinskaya Street, 9), architect is Vladimir Vasilkovsky. Text on the board: "People's Artist of the USSR Vladimir Rostislavovich Gardin lived in this house from 1927 to 1965" (Russian: «В этом доме с 1927 года по 1965 год жил народный артист СССР Владимир Ростиславович Гардин».
