= War and Peace (1915 film) =

- Directed by: Vladimir Gardin
- Written by: Vladimir Gardin
- Based on: War and Peace by Leo Tolstoy
- Starring: Vera Karalli
- Release date: 1915
- Country: Russian Empire
- Languages: Silent; Russian intertitles

War and Peace (Война и мир, Voyna i mir) is a 1915 Russian film written and co-directed by Vladimir Gardin, based on the 1869 novel by Leo Tolstoy.
