= Andrei Abrikosov =

Soviet actor (1906-1973)

Andrei Lvovich Abrikosov
- Андрей Львович Абрикосов
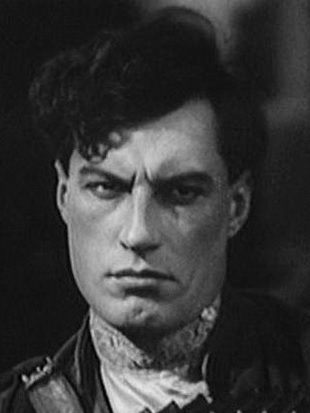
- Abrikosov in 1935
- Born: 14 November 1906; Simferopol, Russian Empire (present-day Ukraine)
- Died: 21 October 1973 (aged 66); Moscow, Soviet Union
- Resting place: Novodevichy Cemetery
- Occupation: Actor
- Years active: 1929 – 1973
- Children: Grigori Abrikosov

Andrei Lvovich Abrikosov (Note: Russian: Андрей Львович Абрикосов, romanized: Andrey Lvovich Abrikosov) (14 November 1906 – 21 October 1973) was a Soviet and Russian stage and film actor. He was named People's Artist of the USSR in 1968.

== Biography ==
He was born in Simferopol to an agronomist family. He was a member of the Communist Party from 1950. He died in Moscow, and was buried at the Novodevichy Cemetery.

== Filmography ==
Year	Title	Role	Notes
1930	Tikhiy Don	Grigori Pantelejevich Melekhov	
1932	Vstrechnyy	Pavel	
1933	Prosperiti		
1933	Odna radost		
1934	The Four Visits of Samuel Wolfe		
1935	Lyubov i nenavist	Red Detachment Commander	
1935	Vrazhyi tropy	Innokentiy Okatov	
1936	Partiynyy bilet	Pavel Kuganov	
1937	Dawn of Paris	Etienne Millard	
1938	Lyudi doliny Sumbar		
1938	Alexander Nevsky	Gavrilo Oleksich	
1939	Vysokaya nagrada	Nikolay Mikhaylov	
1939	Stepan Razin	Stepan Razin	
1940	Baby	Stepan Stepanovich Kladov	
1940	Pyatyy okean	Leontiy Shirokov	
1941	The Girl from Leningrad	Lt. Sergei Korovin	
1943	Prints i nishchiy	Miles Hendon	
1945; 1958	Ivan the Terrible	Boyar Fyodor Kolychev / Archbishop Philip	
1945	The Turning Point	Lt. Gen. Krivenko	
1946	Morskoy batalion	Lt. Sergey Markin	
1948	Malchik s okrainy	chlen TSK VKPb	
1950	The Fall of Berlin	Gen. Antonov	
1950	Alitet Leaves for the Hills	Nikita Sergeevich Los	
1956	The Drummer's Fate	Polovchev	
1956	Ilya Muromets	Prince Vladimir	[Prince Vanda, US]
1956	Serdtse byotsya vnov	Professor Klyonov	
1958	Tsel ego zhizni	Roman Aleksandrovich Azarov	
1958	Delo Pyostrykh		
1959	Virgin Soil Upturned	Dobrov	
1960	Podnyataya tselina	Ippolit Shalyy	
1962	Ispoved		
1963	Generali da zizilebi	Gardener	
1964	Sekretar obkoma	Artyom Artamonov (pervy sekretar sosednego obkoma)	
1964	Sokrovyzhcha respublyki		
1965	Svet dalyokoy zvezdy	General Osokin	
1965	Odinochestvo	Danila	
1967	Wedding in Malinovka	Balyasny	
1969	The Brothers Karamazov	Samsonov	
1969	Troye	Stroganyy	
1972	Ruslan and Ludmila	Prince Vladimir	

== Awards and honors ==
- Order of the Red Banner of Labour (1939)
- Stalin Prize, 1st class (1941)
- Honored Artist of the RSFSR (1946)
- Medal "For Valiant Labour in the Great Patriotic War 1941–1945" (1946)
- Order of the Red Banner of Labour (1946)
- Medal "In Commemoration of the 800th Anniversary of Moscow" (1948)
- People's Artist of the RSFSR (1952)
- People's Artist of the USSR (1968)
- Jubilee Medal "In Commemoration of the 100th Anniversary of the Birth of Vladimir Ilyich Lenin" (1970)
