= Olga Preobrazhenskaya (director) =

Russian actress and film director (1881–1971)

- Born: 24 July 1881; Moscow, Russia
- Died: 30 October 1971 (aged 90); Moscow, Soviet Union
- Occupations: Film director; actress
- Years active: 1913–1961

Olga Ivanovna Preobrazhenskaya (Russian: Ольга Ивановна Преображенская, 24 July 1881 – 30 October 1971) was a Russian actress and film director. She was one of the first female film directors and the first female film director in Russia.

She is best known for directing the films Women of Ryazan (1927) and And Quiet Flows the Don (1930).

== Biography ==
Olga Ivanovna Preobrazhenskaya was born on 24 July 1881, in Moscow. From 1901 to 1904, she studied in the actor school of Moscow Art Theater. From 1905, she worked in theaters in Poltava, Tbilisi, Riga, Odessa, Voronezh and Moscow.

In 1913, she debuted as film actress in The Keys to Happiness, directed by Vladimir Gardin and Yakov Protazanov, and she starred in several popular adaptations of Russian classics, such as War and Peace and On the Eve (both 1915). Preobrazhenskaya was one of the founders of the actor school of the VGIK, where she taught from 1918 to 1925.

In 1916 Preobrazhenskaya directed Miss Peasant — it was her directorial debut. When it was released it received praise, but since it was the debut film of a woman director, it was treated with distrust, and on the posters and reviews her name was often written with a male ending or attributed to other directors.

After graduating from the Moscow Art Theater School in 1923 she worked as a director at the Goskino film studio (now Mosfilm), was the second director on the films Locksmith and Chancellor (1923). Starting in 1927, she collaborated with film director Ivan Pravov, with whom she made several films together. Their most well-known films were Women of Ryazan (1927) and And Quiet Flows the Don (1930).

== Filmography ==
As Actress

Year	Title	Role	Notes
1924	Locksmith and Chancellor (Слесарь и канцлер)		
1923	The Landowner (Помещик)		
1919	The Iron Heel (Железная пята)		
1916	Whose Guilt? (Чья вина?)		
1916	Deep Pool (Омут)		
1916	The Great Passion (Великая страсть)		
1915	Privalov's Millions (Приваловские миллионы)		
1915	Plebeian (Плебей)		
1915	Peterburg Slums (Петербургские трущобы)		
1915	On the Eve (Накануне)		
1915	The Garnet Bracelet (Гранатовый браслет)		
1915	War and Peace (Война и мир)		
1914	Mask of Death (Маска смерти)		
1914	A Nest of Gentlefolk (Дворянское гнездо)		
1914	Dionysus' Anger (Гнев Диониса)		
1913	The Keys to Happiness (Ключи счастья)		

As Director

Year	Title	Role	Notes
1941	Lad from Taiga (Парень из тайги)	Director	co-directed with Ivan Pravov
1939	Stepan Razin (Степан Разин)	Director	co-directed with Ivan Pravov
1935	Paths of Enemies (Вражьи тропы)	Director	co-directed with Ivan Pravov
1930	And Quiet Flows the Don (Тихий Дон)	Director	co-directed with Ivan Pravov
1929	The Last Attraction (Последний аттракцион)	Director	co-directed with Ivan Pravov
1928	A Town Full of Light (Светлый город)	Director	co-directed with Ivan Pravov
1927	Women of Ryazan (Бабы рязанские)	Director	
1927	Anne (Аня)	Director	
1926	Kashtanka (Каштанка)	Director	
1925	Fedka's truth (Федькина правда)	Director	
1923	The Landowner (Помещик)	Director	
1918	Tale of Priest Pankrat (Сказка о попе Панкрате)	Director	
1917	Victoria (Виктория)	Director	
1916	Miss Peasant (Барышня - крестьянка)	Director	co-directed with Vladimir Gardin
