= Mark Taimanov =

Russian chess grandmaster (1926–2016)

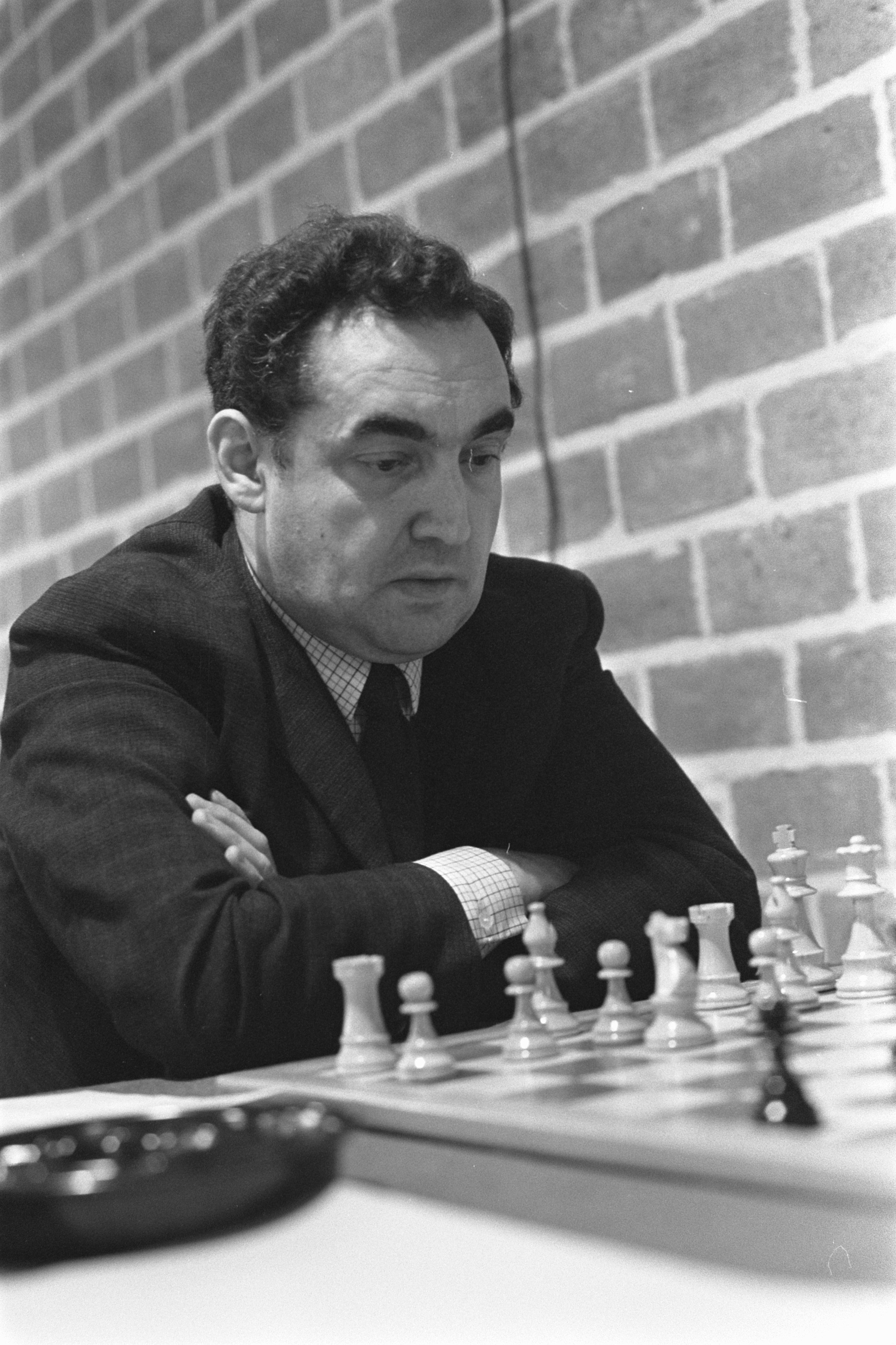
- Taimanov in 1970

Personal information
- Born: Mark Evgenievich Taimanov; 7 February 1926 Kharkov, Ukrainian SSR, Soviet Union
- Died: 28 November 2016 (aged 90) Saint Petersburg, Russia

Chess career
- Country: Soviet Union (until 1991); Russia (from 1991)
- Title: Grandmaster (1952)
- Peak rating: 2600 (July 1971)
- Peak ranking: No. 15 (July 1971)

Mark Evgenievich Taimanov (Russian: Марк Евгеньевич Тайманов; 7 February 1926 – 28 November 2016) was one of the leading Soviet and Russian chess players, among the world's top 20 players from 1946 to 1971. A prolific chess author, Taimanov was awarded the title of Grandmaster in 1952 and in 1956 won the USSR Chess Championship. He was a World Championship Candidate in 1953 and 1971, and several opening variations are named after him. Taimanov was also a world-class concert pianist.

== Early life ==
Taimanov was born in Kharkov (now Kharkiv, Ukraine), where his parents studied at the time. They moved to Leningrad when he was six months old. His father Evgeny Zakharovich Taimanov was Jewish; his family escaped to Kharkiv from Smolensk during World War I. Evgeny was a student at the Kharkiv Polytechnic Institute and later made a career as a head engineer at the Kirov Plant and the Hydraulic Plant, but left it to work as an engineer at the Leningrad Conservatory and various Leningrad theaters after his brother and his wife's relatives were imprisoned in 1937.

Taimanov's mother Serafima Ivanovna Ilyina came from an Orthodox Russian family; she studied at the Kharkiv National Kotlyarevsky University of Arts. As a piano teacher she later introduced her son to music. Mark was the eldest of three children. When he was ten, he performed as a young violinist in the Soviet children's film Beethoven Concerto that was released in 1936. To practice for his role Taimanov studied the violin for a year. Many years later when on tour, Isaac Stern met Taimanov and complimented his violin playing in the movie, saying that all the young actors "didn't even know how to hold the violin properly. Only once I saw a violinist who did it, in the film Beethoven Concert". During the Great Patriotic War he and his father evacuated to Tashkent shortly before the Siege of Leningrad started; his mother along with his two siblings decided to stay in the city and had to survive the siege up till their evacuation in March 1942.

== Chess career ==
He was awarded the International Master title in 1950, and the International Grandmaster title in 1952 by FIDE. He played in the Candidates Tournament in Zürich in 1953, where he tied for eighth place. He was regularly in the world's top 20 players for over 25 years.

=== Soviet team play ===
He represented Leningrad in internal Soviet regional team competitions, scoring (+36−24=56) in 116 games, across 15 events, between 1948 and 1983. He represented the sports society "Burevestnik" (Students) in internal Soviet club team competitions.

=== Soviet championships ===
He played in 23 USSR Chess Championships (a record equalled by Efim Geller), tying for first place twice. In 1952 he lost the playoff match to Mikhail Botvinnik, who was World Champion at the time. In 1956, after finishing equal with Yuri Averbakh and Boris Spassky in the tournament proper, he won a match-tournament ahead of them, for the title.

=== Loss to Fischer ===
Taimanov lost to Bobby Fischer in the 1971 Candidates quarterfinal by the unprecedented score of 6–0. About this match, Taimanov later recalled that Fischer "was an incredibly tough defender" and that "the third game proved to be the turning point of the match". After his loss to Fischer, the Soviet government was embarrassed, and, as Taimanov later put it in a 2002 interview, found it "unthinkable" that he could have lost the match so badly to an American without a "political explanation". Soviet officials took away Taimanov's salary and no longer allowed him to travel overseas. The official reason given for punishing Taimanov was that he had brought a book by Aleksandr Solzhenitsyn into the country, but that explanation was merely a bureaucratic pretext. The officials later "forgave" Taimanov, and lifted the sanctions against him. Fischer's overwhelming match wins later in 1971, first by 6–0 against Bent Larsen, then by 6½–2½ against Tigran Petrosian, may have helped contribute to their change of mind. Taimanov considered this match "the culminating point" of his chess career and later wrote a book about the match, titled How I Became Fischer's Victim.

=== Other tournaments ===
In 2001 he came second, a half point behind the winner Jacob Murey, at the first European Senior Chess Championship in Saint-Vincent.

=== International teams ===
Taimanov represented the USSR in international team play with enormous success. At the 1956 Chess Olympiad in Moscow, as first reserve he scored (+6−0=5), winning team gold and board bronze medals. This was his only Olympiad appearance.

Taimanov represented the USSR four times in the European Team Chess Championship. At Vienna 1957, he played board seven, scored (+2−0=3), winning team and board gold medals. At Oberhausen 1961, he played board eight, scored (+6−0=3), and won team and board gold medals. At Hamburg 1965, he played board seven, scored (+3−1=4), and won team and board gold medals. At Kapfenberg 1970, he played board six, scored (+4−0=2), and won team and board gold medals.

In the inaugural Russia (USSR) vs Rest of the World team match, Belgrade 1970, he played board seven, and scored (+2−1=1) against Wolfgang Uhlmann.

=== Chess legacy ===
Taimanov was one of the few players to have beaten six world champions (Botvinnik, Vasily Smyslov, Mikhail Tal, Tigran Petrosian, Boris Spassky, and Anatoly Karpov). Opening variations are named after Taimanov in the Sicilian Defence, Modern Benoni and Nimzo-Indian Defence. He wrote books on two of his named variations, as well as an autobiographical best games collection. Taimanov's favorite chess players were Alexander Alekhine, Mikhail Tal, and Garry Kasparov.

=== Major chess writings ===
Note that several of Taimanov's books are available in Russian, German, and English.

- Slawisch bis Reti-Eröffnung, by Mark Taimanov, general editor Pavel Kondratiev, German language, Sportverlag, Berlin, 1976.
- Damengambit bis Holländisch, by Mark Taimanov, general editor Yakov Neishtadt, German language, Sportverlag, Berlin, 1980.
- Modernes Benoni bis Wolga-Gambit, by Mark Taimanov, general editor Eduard Gufeld, German language, Sportverlag, Berlin, 1982.
- Holländisch bis Bird-Eröffnung, by Mark Taimanov, general editor Pavel Kondratiev, German language, Sportverlag, Berlin, 1983.
- Sicilian: Paulsen, by Mark Taimanov, English language, Batsford, London, 1983.
- Königsindisch bis Altindisch, by Mark Taimanov, general editor Eduard Gufeld, German language, Sportverlag, Berlin, 1984
- Zasčita Nimzovica, by Mark Taimanov, Russian language, 1985.
- Englisch: Klassisch bis seltene Systeme 12. Königsindisch: Sämisch-Systeme bis Vierbauernvariante, by Mark Taimanov, general editor Eduard Gufeld, German language, Sportverlag, Berlin, 1985.
- Damenindisch bis Katalanisch, by Mark Taimanov, general editor Eduard Gufeld, German language, Sportverlag, Berlin, 1985.
- The World Chess Championship, Karpov—Kasparov: Moscow 1985, by Yuri Averbakh and Mark Taimanov, English language, 1986.
- The Sicilian Defence: Taimanov System, by Mark Taimanov, English language, Batsford, London, 1989, ISBN 0713456167.
- Winning with the Sicilian, by Mark Taimanov, English language, Batsford, London, 1991.
- Ja byl žertvoj Fisera (How I Became Fischer's Victim), by Mark Taimanov, Russian language, 1993. English translation, Quality Chess, Glasgow, 2021, ISBN 978-1-78483-149-3.
- Taimanov's Selected Games, by Mark Taimanov, English language, Batsford, London, 1996.
- The Soviet Championships, by Bernard Cafferty and Mark Taimanov, Batsford, London, English language, 1998 (softcover reprint 2016, Everyman, London, ISBN 978-1781943380).
- Šachmatnaja škola Marka Taimanova, by Mark Taimanov, Russian language, Schachforum (German language), 2008; originally published St. Petersburg 2003 (autobiography).

== Music career ==
Taimanov was a top concert pianist in the Soviet Union. With his first wife, Lyubov Bruk, he formed a piano duo, some of whose recordings were included in the Phillips and Steinway series Great Pianists of the 20th Century. Taimanov personally knew composer Dmitri Shostakovich, cellist Mstislav Rostropovich and pianist Sviatoslav Richter.

== Personal life and death ==
Taimanov married four times. He remarried late in life, and became the father of twins at the age of 78. Fifty-seven years separate his oldest child (who was also a strong chess player and on one occasion, participated in the final of the Leningrad City Championship) and his twins.

His younger sister Irina Taimanova (born 1941) is a prominent opera director, TV presenter and professor at the Saint Petersburg Conservatory.

Taimanov died on 28 November 2016 in Saint Petersburg, at the age of 90.
