= Ivan Pravov =

- Born: Ivan Konstantinovich Pravov; 4 November 1899; Voronezh, Russian Empire (now Russia)
- Died: 11 May 1971 (aged 71); Moscow, Soviet Union (now Russia)
- Occupations: Film director screenwriter
- Years active: 1927–1966

Ivan Konstantinovich Pravov (Russian: Иван Константинович Правов; 4 November 1899 – 11 May 1971) was a Russian and Soviet film director and screenwriter.

== Filmography ==
director

- Women of Ryazan (Бабы рязанские) (1927); co-directed with Olga Preobrazhenskaya
- A Town Full of Light (Светлый город) (1928); co-directed with Olga Preobrazhenskaya
- The Last Attraction (Последний аттракцион) (1929); co-directed with Olga Preobrazhenskaya
- And Quiet Flows the Don (Тихий Дон) (1930); co-directed with Olga Preobrazhenskaya
- Paths of Enemies (Вражьи тропы) (1935); co-directed with Olga Preobrazhenskaya
- Stepan Razin (Степан Разин) (1939); co-directed with Olga Preobrazhenskaya
- Lad from Taiga (Парень из тайги) (1941); co-directed with Olga Preobrazhenskaya
- Diamonds (Алмазы) (1947)
- Under Gold's Power (Во власти золота) (1957)
- One Line (Одна строка) (1960)
- Chain Reaction (Цепная реакция) (1962)
- Treasures of the Republic (Сокровища республики) (1964)
- The Gift (Подарок) (1966); short

screenwriter

- Anne (Аня) (1927)
- A Town Full of Light (Светлый город) (1928)
- And Quiet Flows the Don (Тихий Дон) (1930)
- Paths of Enemies (Вражьи тропы) (1935)
- Stepan Razin (Степан Разин) (1939)
- Under Gold's Power (Во власти золота) (1957)
