= Cinema of Mongolia =

- No. of screens: 73 (2025)
- Main distributors: Tengis cinema Urgoo Cinema; Soyombo; Prime Cineplex; Hunnu Cinema; Gegeenten cinema Cinema Next

Produced feature films (2011)
- Fictional: 1 (7.7%)
- Animated: -
- Documentary: 12 (92.3%)

Number of admissions (2024)
- Total: 2,700,000

Gross box office (2024)
- Total: MNT 31.1 billion

The cinema of Mongolia has been strongly influenced by the cinema of Russia, which differentiates it from cinematic developments in the rest of Asia.

== History ==
It is assumed that the first cinematographic performances in Mongolia happened between 1903 and 1913, as private events for the prince Tögs-Ochiryn Namnansüren and the Jebtsundamba in the capital Urga (now named Ulaanbaatar).

After the socialist revolution, the Mongolian People's Revolutionary Party decided in its fifth congress of 1925 to use movies as an instrument of mass education. From 1926 on, mobile projection facilities would regularly show Soviet films to the Mongolian people. The first permanent cinema, Ard (ард, 'people') opened in the capital in 1934. Eventually, every aimag center would have fixed cinemas, and every sums of Mongolia or negdel would have a mobile cinema. In the 1990s, many cinemas, fixed and mobile alike, closed down or reduced activities.

=== Mongol Kino ===
The national film studios, Mongol Kino, were founded in 1935, with Soviet technical assistance. Their first productions were a documentary on the "47th anniversary of the 1st May" and a fictional story named A Mongol son (Mongol Khüü) directed by the Russian Ilya Trauberg and Mongolian Demberel Baldan. The first Mongolian-directed movie was the black-and-white short feature Norjmaa's Destiny (Norjmaagiin Zam) by Baldan in 1938.

From then on, Mongolian movie production focused on heroic revolutionary propaganda and ancient popular legends, still often under Russian direction. This program was very successful with movies like Sükhbaatar (1942) and Tsogt Taij (1945). The studios of Mongol Kino also produced documentaries and current news reports.

=== 1950s and 1960s ===
After World War II, the party moved the focus on working-class heroes, reflected in movies like New Year (Shine Jil, 1954) by the first professional filmmaker of Mongolia, Tseveeny Zandraa. Tseveeny Zandraa, also one of the initial members of the Writers' Union of Mongolia], was a professor at The University of Finance and Economics of Mongolia, when he realized he wanted to be a filmmaker. WWII was already at its peak when he headed to Russia to study at The Russian State University of Cinematography becoming their first International Student in 1943. Examples of this genre are Awakening (Serelt, 1957) by S. Genden and The Rejected Girl (Gologdson khüükhen) by Dendevyn Chimid-Osor. In 1955, the first musical comedy appeared, which started a trend that continued into the 1960s. The first color movie was The Golden Yurt (Altan Örgöö, 1961), based on a folktale. It was produced in cooperation with the East German DEFA studios. The music of the film, written by L. Mördorj, was played and recorded by the GDR Radio orchestra and became a classic of the Mongolian symphony. As a fairy tale film, it is rich with match moving and other cinematographic special effects.

=== 1970s and 1980s ===
While the production of documentaries increased, fictional stories turned to everyday life in the 1970s. One of the most famous movies of that time, The Crystal Clear Tamir River (Tungalag Tamir, 1970) by Ravjagiin Dorjpalam, based on the novel by Chadraabalyn Lodoidamba, is however set during Mongolia's 1921 revolution. Other well-known productions were The Legend of the Mother Oasis (Ehe Bürdiin domog), made in 1976 by Gombojav Jigjidsuren (Гомбожавын Жигжидсүрэн) and Jamyangiin Buntar (Жамъяангийн Бунтар), and The Five Colors of the Rainbow (Solongiin tavan öngö) in 1979. The Leading Wrestler Garuda (Garid Magnai, 1983), by Jamyangiin Buntar, marks a turning point where the authors liberate themselves from existing power structures. Queen Mandukhai the Wise (Mongolian: Мандухай сэцэн хатан, 1987) is a Mongolian film based on a novel of the same title by Shagdarjavyn Natsagdorj (1981) and directed by Begziin Baljinnyam, marking the reflection of the political reformation movement perestroika in Mongolia.

=== 1990s and 2000s ===
After the introduction of the market economy, most mobile and permanent cinemas closed down. Mongolian productions had to seek partners outside of the former COMECON. However, some young filmmakers of the transformation period, such as N. Gankhuyag, B. Uranchimeg, and J. Binder, made successful domestic films.

The movie Genghis Khan, Under Power of the Eternal Sky, starring Enkhtaivan Agvaantseren, was the first Mongolian-Japanese co-production. State of Dogs (Nokhoin Oron, 1998) was written and directed collaboratively by the Belgian Peter Brosens and the Mongolian Dorjkhandyn Turmunkh.

The director Byambasuren Davaa has had international success with the German-Mongolian co-productions The Story of the Weeping Camel (2003, nominated for an Academy Award as a foreign documentary in 2005) and The Cave of the Yellow Dog (2005).

Elsnii Nuudel (Mongolian: Элсний нүүдэл, Movement of Sand), was a successful movie produced for the domestic market in 2007. Later well known films include Lim Negen Durlal and Goyoliin Daashinz.

The 2008 historical film A Pearl in the Forest (Mongolian: Мойлхон) by director Enkhtaivan Agvaantseren is one of the first films to openly talk about the events of the 1930s and the impact of the rise of Soviet communism on Mongolia. It is also one of the first films intended to present the history of the Buryats, one of the ethnic groups present in Mongolia.

== See also ==
- East Asian cinema
- List of Mongolian films
- Culture of Mongolia
- Enkhtaivan Agvaantseren
- Byambasuren Davaa
