= List of Soviet films of 1936 =

A list of films produced in the Soviet Union in 1936 (see 1936 in film).

== 1936 ==
Title	Russian title	Director	Cast	Genre	Notes
1936
Accidental Meeting	Случайная встреча	Igor Savchenko	Galina Pashkova	Comedy	
Baltic Deputy	Депутат Балтики	Iosif Kheifits, Aleksandr Zarkhi	Nikolay Cherkasov	Drama	
Beethoven Concerto	Концерт Бетховена	Mikhail Gavronsky and Vladimir Schmidtgof	Mark Taimanov		
By the Bluest of Seas	У самого синего моря	Boris Barnet	Yelena Kuzmina, Nikolai Kryuchkov	Romantic comedy	
The Children of Captain Grant	Дети капитана Гранта	Vladimir Vaynshtok	Nikolai Cherkasov	Adventure	
Circus	Цирк	Grigori Aleksandrov	Lyubov Orlova, Vladimir Volodin, Sergei Stolyarov	Musical	
Convict	Заключенные	Yevgeni Chervyakov	Mikhail Astangov	Drama	
Cosmic Voyage	Космический рейс	Vasili Zhuravlov	Sergei Komarov, Kselniya Moskalenko	Science fiction	
Dawn of Paris	Зори Парижа	Grigori Roshal	Nikolai Plotnikov	Drama	
Dubrovsky	Дубровский	Aleksandr Ivanovsky	Boris Livanov	Drama	
Girl Friends	Подруги	Lev Arnshtam	Zoya Fyodorova, Yanina Zhejmo	Drama	
The Goalkeeper	Вратарь	Semyon Timoshenko	Grigory Pluzhnik	Comedy	
Journey to Arzrum	Путешествие в Арзрум	Moisei Levin	Dmitry Zhuravlyov	Drama	
The Last Night	Последняя ночь	Yuli Raizman	Ivan Pelttser	Drama	
Late for a Date	Девушка спешит на свидание	Mikhail Verner	Mikhail Rostovtsev, Andrei Kostrichkin, Stepan Kayukov	Comedy	
The Nightingale	Соловей-Соловушко	Nikolai Ekk	Valentina Ivashova	Drama	
Once in the Summer	Однажды летом	Khanan Shmain	Igor Ilyinsky, Leonid Kmit, Ivan Koval-Samborsky	Comedy	
Party Membership Card	Партийный билет	Ivan Pyryev	Andrei Abrikosov	Crime drama	
Prometheus	Прометей	Ivan Kavaleridze	Ivan Tverdokhlib	Historical	Banned in February 1936
The Miracle Worker	Чудесница	Aleksandr Medvedkin	Leonid Alekseev	Comedy	
The Sailors of Kronstadt	Мы из Кронштадта	Efim Dzigan	Vasiliy Zaychikov	Drama	
The Thirteen	Тринадцать	Mikhail Romm	Ivan Novoseltsev	Adventure	
Seekers of Happiness	Искатели счастья	Vladimir Korsch-Sablin, Iosif Shapiro	Vebyamin Zuskin	Drama	
Seven Brave Men	Семеро смелых	Sergei Gerasimov	Nikolay Bogolyubov	Action	
Son of Mongolia	Сын Монголии	Ilya Trauberg	Tse-Ven Rabdan	Drama	
Without a Dowry	Бесприданница	Yakov Protazanov	Olga Pyzhova	Drama	

== See also ==
- 1936 in the Soviet Union
