= List of Mongolian films =

This is a list of films by year produced in the country of Mongolia which came into existence officially in November 1936. The lists of Mongolian films are divided by period for political reasons. For an A-Z list of films see Category:Mongolian films.

Title	Year	Director	Cast	Genre	Notes
Aldas	1994				
Altan urgoo/Die Goldene Jurte; Алтан өргөө	1961	R. Dorjpalam, Gottfried Kolditz	J. Luvsanjamts, Ts. Tsegmid	Folklore	Mongolian first color film, co-production with East Germany
By the Will of Chingis Khan	2009	Andrei Borissov	Eduard Ondar, Orgil Makhaan	Historical	Co-produced with Russia
The Cavalry; Морин цэрэг танкист	1942	M. Bold, M. Luvsanjamts	N.Tsegmid, Ch. Dolgorsuren, Ts. Tserendorj		
The Cave of the Yellow Dog; Шар нохойн там	2005				
Cherez Gobi i Khingan	1981				
Enemy of Life; Амьдралын дайсан	1941	Temet Natsagdorj			
The Faith; Итгэл	2016	B. Garamkhand	Baljinnyamyn Amarsaikhan, M. Myagmar, B. Temuun, Ts. Tumurkhuyag, S. Batzorig	Drama	Won Audience Award at the 2016 Asian World Film Festival
The Fearless Patriot; Аймшиггүй эх оронч	1942	M. Luvsanjamts	O. Luvsan, Tsevegsuren, Sanjaa		
The First Lesson; Анхдугаар хичээл	1940	M. Bold	M. Gongor, Ts. Tsevegmid, L. Luvsanbaldan		
Five Fingers of One Hand; Гарын Таван Хуруу	1983	Begziin Baljinnyam		Drama	
Genghis Khan: To the Ends of the Earth and Sea	2007	Shinichiro Sawai	Takashi Sorimachi	Historical action drama	Japanese co-production; also known as The Blue Wolf: To the Ends of the Earth and Sea or Aoki Ôkami: chi hate umi tsukiru made
The Great Sin of Being Alive	1995				
Icheend N'	1973				
The Incident on the Border; Хил дээр гарсан хэрэг	1942	M. Bold	A. Tserendendev, O. Luvsan, O. Rentsennorov		
Iskhod	1968				
Khatan-Bator	1981				
Kheltgii Zaya; Хэлтгий заяа	1993	N. Gankhuyag	J. Munkhbat, B.Tungalag, M.Mungun	Myth	
Khurgen khuu Хүргэн хүү	1971	Jigjid	D. Dondov	Drama	
Molom, conte de Mongolie	1995				
Son of Mongolia; Монгол хүү	1936	Ilya Trauberg	Ch. Tseveen, Sosor, Gombo		First Mongolian film
My Beautiful Jinjiimaa	2006				
Nar hirtsenjil	1975				
Naran Urgakhiig Khuleekhgui; Наран ургахыг хүлээхгүй	1997	N. Gankhuyag	G. Zolboot, Ch. Ichinkhorloo, U.Erdenezaan, I.Odonchimeg, D.Mendbayar	Drama	
Nohoi oron	1998				
Norjmaa's Destiny; Норжмаагийн зам	1938	Temet Natsagdorj	Legjmaa, Khand, Puntsag, Goysen		
No right to die, Genghis Khan; Үхэж үл болно, Чингис Хаан	2008	L Erdenebulgan	Tsegmedin Tumurbaatar; P Tserendagva; N Suvd; B Jargalsaikhan	Historical action drama	Life of Genghis Khan, the great king and the founder of Mongolia.
A Pearl in the Forest; МОЙЛХОН	2008	Enkhtaivan Agvaantseren	Bayarmaa Baatar; Zolboot Gombo; Narankhuu Khatanbaatar; G. Altanshagai	Historical drama	
The Plague; Тарваган тахал	1940	Nachindorj	Sodnom, Sanjaa, N.Tsevegmid		
Polsedmez naroda	1959				
Prologue of the Undeclared War	1985				
I Love You; Би чамд хайртай	1985	Begziin Baljinnyam			
Der Scout	1983				
Setgelin duudlagaar	1965				
Sky Became Clear	1979				
The Story of the Weeping Camel; Ингэн нулимс	2003		Janchiv Ayurzana, Chimed Ohin, mgaabazar Gonson, Zeveljamz Nyam, Ikhbayar Amgaabazar, Odgerel Ayusch	Documentary	
Summer With Extra Month	1987				
Sukhbaatar; Сүхбаатар	1942	A. Zarhi, I. Hyoipits, Temet Natsagdorj, M. Bold	Syoverdlin, Gelegdorj, Rentsennorov, Gyorkkov		
Thief of the Mind or Mind Thief; Бодлын хулгайч	2011	Janchivdorjiin Sengedorj	Baljinnyamyn Amarsaikhan		
Toorog	1994	Yondonbaliin Tserendolgor			Music by Dargvin Luvsansharav
Tsogt Taij; Цогт тайж	1945	D. Jigjid, D. Ganjuur, M. Luvsanjamts, M. Bold, Yu. K. Tarich	Ts. Tsegmid, Ch. Dolgorsuren, A. Tserendendev	Historical epic	
Ulaan-Baatart baygaa miniy aavd	1961			Drama	
An Unforgettable Autumn	1977				
Uuliin Tumur	2004				
Wolf Pack; Сүрэг чоно	1939	Temet Natsagdorj	D. Chimed-Osor, D. Ichinkhorloo, Ch, Dolgorsuren		
Words from the Heart	2003				

== Sources ==
- Mongolian film at the Internet Movie Database
- D., Tsolmon (1995). Mongolian Movies (Монгол Кино) (in Mongolian). Ulaanbaatar, Hohhot: Eruul Enkh.
