= 1936 in film =

The following is an overview of 1936 in film, including significant events, a list of films released and notable births and deaths. The highest grossing international film of the year was San Francisco, earning more than $5 million worldwide.

== Events ==
- January 9 – Silent screen actor John Gilbert, perhaps best known for his appearances in films such as The Merry Widow and The Big Parade, dies suddenly of a heart attack at his Bel Air home, aged 38.
- February 15 – The first Republic serial, Darkest Africa, is released.
- May 29 – Fritz Lang's first Hollywood film, Fury, starring Spencer Tracy, Sylvia Sidney, and Bruce Cabot, is released.
- September 14 – Film producer Irving Thalberg, often referred by many as the "Boy Wonder of Hollywood", dies from pneumonia at his home in Santa Monica, aged 37.

== Academy Awards ==
- Best Picture: The Great Ziegfeld – Metro-Goldwyn-Mayer
- Best Director: Frank Capra – Mr. Deeds Goes to Town
- Best Actor: Paul Muni – The Story of Louis Pasteur
- Best Actress: Luise Rainer – The Great Ziegfeld
- Best Supporting Actor: Walter Brennan – Come and Get It
- Best Supporting Actress: Gale Sondergaard – Anthony Adverse

== Top-grossing films (U.S.) ==
The top ten 1936 released films by box office gross in North America are as follows:

Highest-grossing films of 1936
Rank	Title	Distributor	Domestic rentals
1	The Great Ziegfeld	MGM	$3,089,000
2	San Francisco	MGM	$2,868,000
3	The Plainsman	Paramount	$2,278,533
4	After the Thin Man	MGM	$1,992,000
5	Modern Times	United Artists	$1,800,000
6	Anthony Adverse	Warner Bros.	$1,783,000
7	Strike Me Pink	United Artists	$1,700,000
8	Rose Marie	MGM	$1,695,000
9	Swing Time	RKO	$1,624,000
10	Libeled Lady	MGM	$1,601,000

== Top Ten Money Making Stars ==
Exhibitors selected the following as the Top Ten Money Making Stars of the Year in Quigley Publishing Company's annual poll.

Rank	Actor/Actress
1.	Shirley Temple
2.	Clark Gable
3.	Fred Astaire and Ginger Rogers
4.	Robert Taylor
5.	Joe E. Brown
6.	Dick Powell
7.	Joan Crawford
8.	Claudette Colbert
9.	Jeanette MacDonald
10.	Gary Cooper

=== Top Western stars ===
A poll of the top Western stars was also published for the first time.

Rank	Actor/Actress
1.	Buck Jones
2.	George O'Brien
3.	Gene Autry
4.	William Boyd
5.	Ken Maynard
6.	Dick Foran
7.	John Wayne
8.	Tim McCoy
9.	Hoot Gibson
10.	Buster Crabbe

== Notable films ==
United States unless stated.

=== 0–9 ===
- 13 Hours by Air, directed by Mitchell Leisen, starring Fred MacMurray, Joan Bennett and ZaSu Pitts
- 15 Maiden Lane, directed by Allan Dwan, starring Claire Trevor and Cesar Romero

=== A ===
- Accused, directed by Thornton Freeland, starring Douglas Fairbanks Jr. and Dolores del Río – (GB)
- Achhoot Kanya (Untouchable Maiden), directed by Franz Osten, starring Ashok Kumar and Devika Rani – (India)
- After the Thin Man, directed by W. S. Van Dyke, starring William Powell, Myrna Loy and James Stewart
- Allá en el Rancho Grande (Out on the Great Ranch), directed by Fernando de Fuentes, starring Tito Guízar and Esther Fernández – (Mexico)
- The Amazing Quest of Ernest Bliss, directed by Alfred Zeisler, starring Cary Grant and Mary Brian – (GB)
- Anthony Adverse, directed by Mervyn LeRoy, starring Fredric March, Olivia de Havilland, and Gale Sondergaard
- Anything Goes, directed by Lewis Milestone, starring Bing Crosby, Ethel Merman and Ida Lupino
- Augustus the Strong (August der Starke), directed by Paul Wegener, starring Michael Bohnen – (Germany/Poland)

=== B ===
- Black Eyes (Cheshmhay-e Siah), directed by Abdolhossein Sepanta – (Iran)
- Blood on Wolf Mountain (Láng shān dié xuě jì), directed by Fei Mu, starring Li Lili – (China)
- The Bohemian Girl, directed by James W. Horne and Charley Rogers, starring Laurel and Hardy
- The Bold Caballero, directed by Wells Root, starring Robert Livingston
- Born to Dance, directed by Roy Del Ruth, starring Eleanor Powell, James Stewart and Una Merkel
- Broken Blossoms, directed by John Brahm, starring Dolly Haas and Emlyn Williams – (GB)
- Bullets or Ballots, directed by William Keighley, starring Edward G. Robinson, Joan Blondell and Humphrey Bogart
- By the Bluest of Seas (U samogo sinego morya), directed by Boris Barnet – (USSR)

=== C ===
- Cain and Mabel, directed by Lloyd Bacon, starring Marion Davies and Clark Gable
- Camel Through the Eye of a Needle (Velbloud uchem jehly), directed by and starring Hugo Haas – (Czechoslovakia)
- Camille, directed by George Cukor, starring Greta Garbo, Robert Taylor and Lionel Barrymore
- Captain January, directed by David Butler, starring Shirley Temple
- The Case Against Mrs. Ames, directed by William A. Seiter, starring Madeleine Carroll and George Brent
- Ceiling Zero, directed by Howard Hawks, starring James Cagney and Pat O'Brien
- César, directed by Marcel Pagnol, starring Raimu – (France)
- The Charge of the Light Brigade, directed by Michael Curtiz, starring Errol Flynn and Olivia de Havilland
- Charlie Chan at the Opera, directed by H. Bruce Humberstone, starring Warner Oland and Boris Karloff
- The Children of Captain Grant (Deti kapitana Granta), directed by Vladimir Vajnshtok – (USSR)
- Circus (Tsirk), directed by Grigori Aleksandrov, starring Lyubov Orlova – (USSR)
- Collegiate, directed by Ralph Murphy, starring Jack Oakie, Frances Langford and Betty Grable
- Come and Get It, directed by Howard Hawks and William Wyler, starring Edward Arnold, Joel McCrea, and Walter Brennan
- Craig's Wife, directed by Dorothy Arzner, starring Rosalind Russell and John Boles
- The Crime of Monsieur Lange (Le Crime de Monsieur Lange), directed by Jean Renoir, starring René Lefèvre – (France)
- Crime Over London, directed by Alfred Zeisler, starring Margot Grahame and Paul Cavanagh – (GB)

=== D ===
Kundal Lal Saigal and Jamuna in Devdas, Barua's 1936 Hindi version.

- Daniel Boone, directed by David Howard, starring George O'Brien
- The Desert Island (Lang tao sha), directed by Wu Yonggang – (China)
- Desire, directed by Frank Borzage, starring Marlene Dietrich and Gary Cooper
- Devdas, directed by Pramathesh Barua, starring K. L. Saigal – (India)
- The Devil Doll, directed by Tod Browning, starring Lionel Barrymore and Maureen O'Sullivan
- Dimples, directed by William A. Seiter, starring Shirley Temple and Frank Morgan
- Dodsworth, directed by William Wyler, starring Walter Huston, Ruth Chatterton, Mary Astor and David Niven
- Dracula's Daughter, directed by Lambert Hillyer, starring Otto Kruger and Gloria Holden
- Dusty Ermine, directed by Bernard Vorhaus, directed by Bernard Vorhaus, starring Anthony Bushell and Jane Baxter – (GB)

=== E ===
- East Meets West, directed by Herbert Mason, starring George Arliss – (GB)
- Empty Saddles, directed by Lesley Selander, starring Buck Jones and Louise Brooks
- Everything Is Thunder, directed by Milton Rosmer, starring Constance Bennett – (GB)

=== F ===
- Follow the Fleet, directed by Mark Sandrich, starring Fred Astaire, Ginger Rogers and Randolph Scott
- Forget Me Not, directed by Zoltan Korda, starring Beniamino Gigli and Joan Gardner – (GB)
- The Four Musketeers (I quattro moschettieri), directed by Carlo Campogalliani – (Italy)
- Fury, directed by Fritz Lang, starring Sylvia Sidney, Spencer Tracy, and Bruce Cabot

=== G ===
- The Garden of Allah, directed by Richard Boleslawski, starring Marlene Dietrich and Charles Boyer
- The General Died at Dawn, directed by Lewis Milestone, starring Gary Cooper and Madeleine Carroll
- General Spanky, directed by Fred Newmeyer and Gordon Douglas, starring Spanky McFarland
- Girl Friends (Podrugi), directed by Lev Arnshtam, starring Zoya Fyodorova – (USSR)
- Go West, Young Man, directed by Henry Hathaway, starring Mae West, Warren William and Randolph Scott
- Gold Diggers of 1937, directed by Lloyd Bacon, starring Dick Powell, Joan Blondell and Glenda Farrell
- The Gorgeous Hussy, directed by Clarence Brown, starring Joan Crawford, Robert Taylor, Lionel Barrymore, Franchot Tone, Melvyn Douglas and James Stewart
- The Great Ziegfeld, directed by Robert Z. Leonard, starring William Powell, Myrna Loy, Luise Rainer and Frank Morgan
- Green Pastures, directed by Marc Connelly and William Keighley, starring Rex Ingram and Eddie "Rochester" Anderson

=== H ===
- Hearts Divided, directed by Frank Borzage, starring Marion Davies and Dick Powell
- Hearts in Bondage, directed by Lew Ayres, starring James Dunn, David Manners and Mae Clarke
- Home Guardsman Bruggler (Standschütze Bruggler), directed by Werner Klingler – (Germany)
- Hopalong Cassidy Returns, directed by Nate Watt, starring William Boyd

=== I ===
- Intermezzo, directed by Gustaf Molander, starring Gösta Ekman and Ingrid Bergman – (Sweden)
- The Invisible Ray, directed by Lambert Hillyer, starring Boris Karloff and Bela Lugosi
- It Had to Happen, directed by Roy Del Ruth, starring George Raft and Rosalind Russell
- It's Love Again, directed by Victor Saville, starring Jessie Matthews and Robert Young – (GB)

=== J ===
- The Jungle Princess, directed by Wilhelm Thiele, starring Dorothy Lamour and Ray Milland

=== K ===
- Der Kaiser von Kalifornien (The Emperor of California), directed by and starring Luis Trenker – (Germany)
- Klondike Annie, directed by Raoul Walsh, starring Mae West and Victor McLaglen

=== L ===
- Laburnum Grove, directed by Carol Reed, starring Edmund Gwenn and Cedric Hardwicke – (GB)
- The Last of the Mohicans, directed by George B. Seitz, starring Randolph Scott
- The Last Outlaw, directed by Christy Cabanne, starring Harry Carey and Hoot Gibson
- The Lawless Nineties, directed by Joseph Kane, starring John Wayne
- Legion of Terror, directed by Charles C. Coleman, starring Bruce Cabot
- Let's Go With Pancho Villa (Vámonos con Pancho Villa), directed by Fernando de Fuentes – (Mexico)
- Libeled Lady, directed by Jack Conway, starring Jean Harlow, William Powell, Myrna Loy and Spencer Tracy
- Limelight, directed by Herbert Wilcox, starring Anna Neagle – (GB)
- Little Lord Fauntleroy, directed by John Cromwell, starring Freddie Bartholomew and Dolores Costello
- Lloyd's of London, directed by Henry King, starring Freddie Bartholomew, Madeleine Carroll and Tyrone Power
- Love Before Breakfast, directed by Walter Lang, starring Carole Lombard, Preston Foster and Cesar Romero
- Love in Exile, directed by Alfred L. Werker, starring Clive Brook and Helen Vinson – (GB)
- Love on the Run, directed by W. S. Van Dyke. starring Joan Crawford, Clark Gable and Franchot Tone
- The Lower Depths (Les Bas-fonds), directed by Jean Renoir, starring Jean Gabin – (France)

=== M ===
- The Man Who Changed His Mind, directed by Robert Stevenson, starring Boris Karloff – (GB)
- Mayerling, directed by Anatole Litvak starring Charles Boyer and Danielle Darrieux – (France)
- Men Are Not Gods, directed by Walter Reisch, starring Miriam Hopkins and Gertrude Lawrence – (GB)
- A Message to Garcia, directed by George Marshall, starring Wallace Beery, Barbara Stanwyck and John Boles
- The Milky Way, directed by Leo McCarey, starring Harold Lloyd and Adolphe Menjou
- Modern Times, a Charlie Chaplin film, with Paulette Goddard
- The Moon's Our Home, directed by William A. Seiter, starring Margaret Sullavan, Henry Fonda and Walter Brennan
- Mr. Deeds Goes to Town, directed by Frank Capra, starring Gary Cooper and Jean Arthur
- My Man Godfrey, directed by Gregory La Cava, starring William Powell and Carole Lombard

=== N ===
- Next Time We Love, directed by Edward H. Griffith, starring Margaret Sullavan, James Stewart and Ray Milland
- Night Mail, documentary directed by Harry Watt and Basil Wright – (GB)

=== O ===
- The Only Son (Hitori musuko), directed by Yasujirō Ozu – (Japan)
- Osaka Elegy (Naniwa erejī), directed by Kenji Mizoguchi, starring Isuzu Yamada – (Japan)
- Our Relations, directed by Harry Lachman, starring Laurel and Hardy

=== P ===
- Palm Springs, directed by Aubrey Scotto, starring Frances Langford, Guy Standing and David Niven
- Paradise Road (Ulička v ráji), directed by Martin Frič, starring Hugo Haas – (Czechoslovakia)
- Pennies from Heaven, directed by Norman Z. McLeod, starring Bing Crosby, Madge Evans and Louis Armstrong
- The Petrified Forest, directed by Archie Mayo, starring Leslie Howard, Bette Davis and Humphrey Bogart
- Pigskin Parade, starring Stuart Erwin
- The Plainsman, directed by Cecil B. DeMille, starring Gary Cooper, Jean Arthur and Charles Bickford
- Poor Little Rich Girl, directed by Irving Cummings, starring Shirley Temple, Alice Faye and Gloria Stuart
- Poppy, directed by A. Edward Sutherland, starring W. C. Fields
- The Prisoner of Shark Island, directed by John Ford, starring Warner Baxter and Gloria Stuart
- Private Number, directed by Roy Del Ruth, starring Loretta Young, Robert Taylor and Basil Rathbone

=== R ===
- Ramona, directed by Henry King, starring Loretta Young and Don Ameche
- Rebellion, directed by Lynn Shores, starring Tom Keene and Rita Hayworth
- Red River Valley, directed by B. Reeves Eason, starring Gene Autry
- Redes, directed by Fred Zinnemann – (Mexico)
- Reefer Madness, directed by Louis J. Gasnier
- Rembrandt, directed by Alexander Korda, starring Charles Laughton – (GB)
- Road Gang, directed by Louis King, starring Donald Woods
- The Road to Glory, directed by Howard Hawks, starring Fredric March, Warner Baxter and Lionel Barrymore
- Romeo and Juliet, directed by George Cukor, starring Norma Shearer, Leslie Howard, John Barrymore and Basil Rathbone
- Rose Marie, directed by W. S. Van Dyke, starring Jeanette MacDonald and Nelson Eddy

=== S ===
- Sabotage, directed by Alfred Hitchcock, starring Sylvia Sidney and Oskar Homolka – (GB)
- San Francisco, directed by W. S. Van Dyke, starring Clark Gable, Jeanette MacDonald and Spencer Tracy
- Satan Met a Lady, directed by William Dieterle, starring Bette Davis and Warren William
- Secret Agent, directed by Alfred Hitchcock, starring Madeleine Carroll, Peter Lorre, John Gielgud and Robert Young – (GB)
- Show Boat, directed by James Whale, starring Irene Dunne, Allan Jones and Paul Robeson
- Silly Billies, directed by Fred Guiol, starring Wheeler & Woolsey
- The Singing Kid, directed by William Keighley, starring Al Jolson
- Sisters of the Gion (Gion no kyōdai), directed by Kenji Mizoguchi – (Japan)
- Small Town Girl, directed by William Wellman, starring Janet Gaynor, Robert Taylor, Lewis Stone and James Stewart
- Son of Mongolia (Syn Mongolii), directed by Ilya Trauberg – (Mongolia)
- Sportszerelem (Love of Sport), directed by László Kardos – (Hungary)
- Spy of Napoleon, directed by Maurice Elvey, starring Richard Barthelmess and Dolly Haas – (GB)
- The Story of Louis Pasteur, directed by William Dieterle, starring Paul Muni
- Stowaway, directed by William A. Seiter, starring Shirley Temple, Robert Young and Alice Faye
- Strike Me Pink, directed by Norman Taurog, starring Eddie Cantor and Ethel Merman
- Sutter's Gold, directed by James Cruze, starring Edward Arnold
- Sweeney Todd: The Demon Barber of Fleet Street, directed by George King, starring Tod Slaughter – (GB)
- Swing Time, directed by George Stevens, starring Fred Astaire and Ginger Rogers

=== T ===
- Tarzan Escapes, directed by Richard Thorpe, starring Johnny Weissmuller and Maureen O'Sullivan
- The Texas Rangers, directed by King Vidor, starring Fred MacMurray, Jack Oakie and Jean Parker
- Theodora Goes Wild, directed by Richard Boleslawski, starring Irene Dunne and Melvyn Douglas
- These Three, directed by William Wyler, starring Miriam Hopkins, Merle Oberon and Joel McCrea
- Things to Come, directed by William Cameron Menzies, starring Raymond Massey, Ralph Richardson and Cedric Hardwicke – (GB)
- Three Godfathers, directed by Richard Boleslawski, starring Chester Morris, Lewis Stone and Walter Brennan
- Till We Meet Again, directed by Robert Florey, starring Herbert Marshall and Gertrude Michael
- Too Many Parents, directed by Robert F. McGowan, starring Frances Farmer
- The Trail of the Lonesome Pine, directed by Henry Hathaway, starring Fred MacMurray, Sylvia Sidney and Henry Fonda
- Tudor Rose, directed by Robert Stevenson, starring Cedric Hardwicke, Nova Pilbeam and John Mills – (GB)

=== V-W ===
- Valiant Is the Word for Carrie, starring Gladys George
- The Walking Dead, directed by Michael Curtiz, starring Boris Karloff, Ricardo Cortez and Edmund Gwenn
- Where There's a Will, directed by William Beaudine, starring Will Hay and Graham Moffatt – (GB)
- Whom the Gods Love, directed by Basil Dean, starring Stephen Haggard – (GB)
- Wife vs. Secretary, directed by Clarence Brown, starring Clark Gable, Jean Harlow, Myrna Loy and James Stewart
- Windbag the Sailor, directed by William Beaudine, starring Will Hay, Moore Marriott and Graham Moffatt – (GB)
- A Woman Rebels, directed by Mark Sandrich, starring Katharine Hepburn and Herbert Marshall

=== Y ===
- Yiddle with his Fiddle (Yidl Mitn Fidl), directed by Joseph Green, starring Molly Picon – (Poland)

== 1936 film releases ==
United States unless stated.

=== January–March ===
- January 1936
  - 16 January
    - Ceiling Zero
    - Strike Me Pink
  - 17 January
    - Augustus the Strong (Germany/Poland)
  - 20 January
    - The Invisible Ray
  - 22 January
    - Collegiate
  - 24 January
    - Anything Goes
  - 28 January
    - Rose Marie
  - 30 January
    - Next Time We Love
- February 1936
  - 6 February
    - The Petrified Forest
  - 7 February
    - The Milky Way
  - 14 February
    - The Bohemian Girl
    - It Had to Happen
  - 15 February
    - The Lawless Nineties
  - 19 February
    - Girl Friends (U.S.S.R.)
  - 20 February
    - Follow the Fleet
    - Things to Come (GB)
  - 22 February
    - The Story of Louis Pasteur
  - 25 February
    - Modern Times
  - 28 February
    - The Prisoner of Shark Island
    - Wife vs. Secretary
  - 29 February
    - Mayerling (France)
    - The Walking Dead
- March 1936
  - 1 March
    - Sutter's Gold
  - 2 March
    - Man of the Frontier
  - 6 March
    - Little Lord Fauntleroy
    - Three Godfathers
  - 9 March
    - Love Before Breakfast
  - 13 March
    - The Trail of the Lonesome Pine
  - 18 March
    - These Three
  - 20 March
    - Silly Billies
  - 22 March
    - The Great Ziegfeld
  - 28 March
    - Road Gang
  - 30 March
    - Too Many Parents

=== April–June ===
- April 1936
  - 4 April
    - Till We Meet Again
  - 10 April
    - A Message to Garcia
    - The Moon's Our Home
    - Small Town Girl
  - 11 April
    - Desire
    - The Singing Kid
  - 16 April
    - Mr. Deeds Goes to Town
  - 20 April
    - By the Bluest of Seas (U.S.S.R.)
  - 24 April
    - Captain January
  - 30 April
    - Thirteen Hours by Air
- May 1936
  - 6 May
    - It's Love Again (GB)
  - 8 May
    - The Case Against Mrs. Ames
  - 11 May
    - Dracula's Daughter
  - 17 May
    - Show Boat
  - 19 May
    - Love in Exile (GB)
  - 20 May
    - Broken Blossoms (GB)
  - 26 May
    - Hearts in Bondage
  - 28 May
    - Osaka Elegy (Japan)
  - 29 May
    - Fury
- June 1936
  - 5 June
    - Private Number
    - Fury
  - 6 June
    - Bullets or Ballots
  - 14 June
    - The Last Outlaw
  - 15 June
    - Secret Agent (GB)
  - 17 June
    - Poppy
  - 20 June
    - Hearts Divided
  - 26 June
    - San Francisco

=== July–September ===
- July 1936
  - 10 July
    - The Devil-Doll
  - 16 July
    - Green Pastures
  - 22 July
    - Satan Met a Lady
  - 24 July
    - Poor Little Rich Girl
  - 28 July
    - The Amazing Quest of Ernest Bliss (GB)
  - 29 July
    - Anthony Adverse
- August 1936
  - 10 August
    - Where There's a Will (GB)
  - 20 August
    - Romeo and Juliet
  - 26 August
    - East Meets West (UK)
  - 27 August
    - Swing Time
  - 28 August
    - The Gorgeous Hussy
    - Militiaman Bruggler (Germany)
    - The Texas Rangers
- September 1936
  - 1 September
    - Tudor Rose
  - 2 September
    - The General Died at Dawn
  - 4 September
    - The Last of the Mohicans
    - The Road to Glory
  - 6 September
    - My Man Godfrey
  - 9 September
    - Spy of Napoleon (GB)
  - 10 September
    - Dusty Ermine (UK)
  - 11 September
    - The Man Who Changed His Mind (GB)
  - 15 September
    - The Children of Captain Grant
  - 23 September
    - Dodsworth
  - 25 September
    - Craig's Wife
    - Ramona
  - 26 September
    - Cain and Mabel
  - 30 September
    - Yiddle with his Fiddle (Poland/U.S.)

=== October–December ===
- October 1936
  - 1 October
    - Everything Is Thunder (UK)
  - 6 October
    - Allá en el Rancho Grande (Mexico)
  - 9 October
    - Libeled Lady
  - 15 October
    - The Garden of Allah
    - Sisters of the Gion (Japan)
  - 16 October
    - 15 Maiden Lane
    - Daniel Boone
    - Dimples
    - Hopalong Cassidy Returns
  - 20 October
    - The Charge of the Light Brigade
  - 22 October
    - Crime Over London (GB)
  - 27 October
    - César (France)
    - Rebellion
  - 30 October
    - Our Relations
- November 1936
  - 1 November
    - Legion of Terror
  - 6 November
    - Come and Get It
    - Rembrandt (GB)
    - Tarzan Escapes
    - A Woman Rebels
  - 12 November
    - Theodora Goes Wild
  - 13 November
    - Go West, Young Man
  - 16 November
    - Intermezzo (Sweden)
    - Laburnum Grove (GB)
    - The Plainsman
  - 20 November
    - Love on the Run
  - 25 November
    - Lloyd's of London
    - Pennies from Heaven
  - 26 November
    - Men Are Not Gods (GB)
  - 27 November
    - Born to Dance
- December 1936
  - 1 December
    - The Bold Caballero
  - 2 December
    - Sabotage (GB)
  - 11 December
    - General Spanky
    - Les bas-fonds (France)
  - 12 December
    - Camille
  - 20 December
    - Empty Saddles
  - 21 December
    - Forget Me Not (UK)
  - 24 December
    - The Jungle Princess
  - 25 December
    - After the Thin Man
    - Stowaway
  - 26 December
    - Gold Diggers of 1937
  - 31 December
    - Let's Go With Pancho Villa (Mexico)

== Serials ==
- Ace Drummond, starring John (Dusty) King
- The Adventures of Frank Merriwell
- The Black Coin
- The Clutching Hand
- Custer's Last Stand
- Darkest Africa, starring Clyde Beatty
- Flash Gordon, starring Buster Crabbe
- The Phantom Rider
- Robinson Crusoe of Clipper Island, starring Ray Mala
- Shadow of Chinatown
- Undersea Kingdom, starring Ray Corrigan
- The Vigilantes Are Coming

== Comedy film series ==
- Harold Lloyd (1913–1938)
- Charlie Chaplin (1914–1940)
- Lupino Lane (1915–1939)
- Buster Keaton (1917–1928)
- Laurel and Hardy (1927–1940)
- Our Gang (1922–1944)
- Harry Langdon (1924–1936)
- Wheeler & Woolsey (1929–1937)
- The Marx Brothers (1929–1946)
- The Three Stooges (1934–1959)

== Animated short film series ==
- Felix the Cat (1919-1936)
- Krazy Kat (1925–1940)
- Oswald the Lucky Rabbit (1927–1938)
- Mickey Mouse (1928–1953)
- Silly Symphonies
  - Elmer Elephant
  - Three Little Wolves
  - Toby Tortoise Returns
  - Three Blind Mousketeers
  - The Country Cousin
  - Mother Pluto
  - More Kittens
- Screen Songs (1929–1938)
- Looney Tunes (1930–1969)
- Terrytoons (1930–1964)
- Merrie Melodies (1931–1969)
- Scrappy (1931–1941)
- Betty Boop (1932–1939)
- Popeye (1933–1957)
- ComiColor Cartoons (1933-1936)
- Happy Harmonies (1934–1938)
- Color Rhapsodies (1934–1949)
- Rainbow Parades (1935-1936)
- Meany, Miny, and Moe (1936–1937)

== Births ==
- January 6 - Corinne Orr, Canadian actress
- January 9 – K Callan, American actress
- January 18 – Tim Barlow, English actor (d. 2023)
- January 22 – Nyree Dawn Porter, English actress (d. 2001)
- January 27 – Troy Donahue, American actor (d. 2001)
- January 28 – Alan Alda, American actor
- February 3 – Jeanine Basinger, American film historian
- February 4 – Gary Conway, American actor and screenwriter
- February 11 – Burt Reynolds, American actor (d. 2018)
- February 12
  - Joe Don Baker, American actor (d. 2025)
  - Paul Shenar, American actor (d. 1989)
- February 14
  - Joan O'Brien, American actor, singer (d. 2025)
  - Andrew Prine, American actor (d. 2022)
- February 17 – Jim Brown, American actor (d. 2023)
- February 29 – Alex Rocco, American actor (d. 2015)
- March 1 – Georgina Spelvin, born Shelley Graham, American pornographic film actress
- March 5 – Dean Stockwell, American actor (d. 2021)
- March 8 – Sue Ane Langdon, American actress
- March 9 – Marty Ingels, American actor, comedian, comedy sketch writer and theatrical agent (d. 2015)
- March 19 – Ursula Andress, Swiss actress
- March 23 – Luisa Mattioli, Italian actress (d. 2021)
- March 30 – Mark Burns, English film and television actor (d. 2007)
- April 9 – Avery Schreiber, American actor and comedian (d. 2002)
- April 12 – Charles Napier, American actor (d. 2011)
- April 19 – Andy Romano, American actor (d. 2022)
- April 29 – Lane Smith, American actor (d. 2005)
- May 1 – Danièle Huillet, French director (d. 2006)
- May 4 – Eleanor Coppola, American documentary filmmaker, artist, and writer (d. 2024)
- May 9
  - Albert Finney, English actor (d. 2019)
  - Glenda Jackson, English actress and politician (d. 2023)
- May 12 – Millie Perkins, American former actress
- May 14 – Bobby Darin, American singer, songwriter, actor (d. 1973)
- May 17 – Dennis Hopper, American actor and performance artist (d. 2010)
- May 20 – Anthony Zerbe, American actor
- May 23 – Charles Kimbrough, American actor (d. 2023)
- May 27 – Louis Gossett Jr., American actor (d. 2024)
- May 28 – John Wilder, American producer, writer and former actor
- May 30 – Keir Dullea, American actor
- June 3 – Larry McMurtry, American novelist and screenwriter (d. 2021)
- June 4 – Bruce Dern, American actor
- June 8 – James Darren, American actor, director and singer (d. 2024)
- June 19 - Takeshi Aono, Japanese voice actor and narrator (d. 2012)
- June 22 – Kris Kristofferson, American actor, musician and songwriter (d. 2024)
- June 24
  - Robert Downey Sr., American actor and director (d. 2021)
  - Paul L. Smith, American-Israeli actor and director (d. 2012)
- June 27 – Shirley Anne Field, English actress (d. 2023)
- June 30 - Tony Musante, American actor (d. 2013)
- July 1 – Ron Masak, American actor (d. 2022)
- July 5 – Shirley Knight, American actress (d. 2020)
- July 8 - William Cort, American actor (d. 1993)
- July 9
  - Dick Richards, American director, producer and screenwriter
  - Richard Wilson, Scottish actor, theatre director and broadcaster
- July 15 - Steven Gilborn, American actor (d. 2009)
- July 24
  - Ruth Buzzi, American actress, comedian and singer (d. 2025)
  - Mark Goddard, American actor (d. 2023)
- July 25 - August Schellenberg, Canadian actor (d. 2013)
- July 30 – John P. Ryan, American actor (d. 2007)
- August 5 - John Saxon, American actor (d. 2020)
- August 15 - Pat Priest, American actress
- August 16 - Anita Gillette, American actress
- August 17 – Floyd Westerman, American musician, political activist and actor (d. 2007)
- August 18 – Robert Redford, American actor and director (d. 2025)
- August 20
  - Míriam Colón, Puerto Rican actress (d. 2017)
  - Philip Voss, British actor (d. 2020)
- August 25 – Hugh Hudson, English director (d. 2023)
- August 26 - Francine York, American actress (d. 2017)
- September 7 – Bruce Gray, Canadian actor (d. 2017)
- September 11 - Charles Dierkop, American actor (d. 2024)
- September 14 - Walter Koenig, American actor and screenwriter (d. 2026)
- September 18 - Fred Burrell, American actor (d. 2018)
- September 19
  - David Hess, American actor, singer, songwriter, and director (d. 2011)
  - Anna Karen, British-South African actress (d. 2022)
- September 20
  - Andrew Davies, Welsh writer
  - Pepper Martin, Canadian-American actor (d. 2022)
- September 21 - Burr DeBenning, American actor (d. 2003)
- September 24 - Jim Henson, American puppeteer, animator, actor, director and screenwriter (d. 1990)
- October 8 - Leonid Kuravlyov, Russian actor (d. 2022)
- October 9 – Brian Blessed, English actor
- October 16
  - Peter Bowles, English actor (d. 2022)
  - Irina Demick, French actress (d. 2004)
- October 19 - Tony Lo Bianco, Italian-American actor (d. 2024)
- October 23
  - Philip Kaufman, American director and screenwriter
  - Kent Bateman, American director and producer
- October 24 – David Nelson, American actor, director and producer (d. 2011)
- October 25 – Burt Brinckerhoff, American actor and director
- October 26 - Shelley Morrison, American actress (d. 2019)
- October 28 - Joe Spinell, American actor (d. 1989)
- November 4 - Jan Tříska, Czech actor (d. 2017)
- November 9 – Teddy Infuhr, American child actor (d. 2007)
- November 19 - Dick Cavett, American television personality, comedian and former talk show host
- November 25 - Matt Clark, American actor (d. 2026)
- November 27 – Joel Barcellos, Brazilian actor (d. 2018)
- December 1 - Melissa Jaffer, Australian actress
- December 3
  - Mary Alice, American actress (d. 2022)
  - Sir Horace Ové, Trinidadian-born British filmmaker (d. 2023)
- December 5 - John Erwin, American voice actor (d. 2024)
- December 6 - David Ossman, American writer and comedian
- December 8 – David Carradine, American actor and martial artist (d. 2009)
- December 10 – Howard Smith, American journalist, director and producer (d. 2014)
- December 13 - Cliff Emmich, American actor (d. 2022)
- December 18 - Gary Gray, American child actor (d. 2006)
- December 22 – Hector Elizondo, American actor
- December 23
  - Frederic Forrest, American actor (d. 2023)
  - James Stacy, American actor (d. 2016)
- December 25 – Ismail Merchant, Indian film producer (d. 2005)
- December 28 - Rhys McConnochie, Australian actor (d. 2026)
- December 29 – Mary Tyler Moore, American actress (d. 2017)

== Deaths ==
- January 9
  - John Gilbert, American actor (b. 1897)
  - Frank Rice, American actor (b. 1892)
- January 24 – Harry T. Morey, American actor (b. 1873)
- February 7 – O. P. Heggie, Australian actor (b. 1877)
- February 17 – Alexander Pantages, Film producer and theater owner (b. 1867)
- February 20 – Max Schreck, German actor (b. 1879)
- February 28 – Justus Hagman, Swedish actor (b. 1859)
- April 6
  - Edmund Breese, American actor (b. 1871)
  - Väinö Lehmus, Finnish actor (b. 1886)
- April 7 – Marilyn Miller, American actress (b. 1898)
- April 21 – Alexandra Carlisle, English actress (b. 1886)
- April 26 – Tammany Young, American actor (b. 1886)
- May 17 – Sir Philip Ben Greet, British actor (b. 1857)
- May 29 – Norman Chaney, American actor (b. 1914)
- June 7 - Jobyna Howland, American actress (b. 1880)
- June 17 – Henry B. Walthall, American actor (b. 1878)
- July 8 - Thomas Meighan, American actor (b. 1879)
- July 11 - James Murray, American actor (b. 1901)
- July 16 - Alan Crosland, American actor and director (b. 1894)
- July 17 - Stephen Roberts, American director (b. 1894)
- August 15 - John B. O'Brien, American actor and director (b. 1884)
- September 14 – Irving Thalberg, American film producer (b. 1899)
- September 20 – Edward Salisbury Field, American playwright and screenwriter (b. 1878)
- October 5 – Bernard Granville, American actor (b. 1888)
- October 10 - William H. Tooker, American actor (b. 1869)
- October 17 – Suzanne Bianchetti, French actress (b. 1889)
- October 30
  - Hugh Buckler, British actor (b. 1881)
  - John Buckler, British actor (b. 1906)
- November 2 – Laird Doyle, American screenwriter (b. 1907)
- November 7 – Sam Livesey, Welsh actor (b. 1873)
- November 18 – Fay Webb, American actress (b. 1907)
- November 27 – Chester A. Lyons, American cinematographer (b. 1885)
- December 8 – David Freedman, American writer (b. 1898)
- December 9 – Lottie Pickford, American actress (b. 1893)
- December 24 – Irene Fenwick, American actress (b. 1887)

== Film debuts ==
- Gaby André – Hélène
- Evelyn Ankers – Land Without Music
- Betty Beckers – The Phantom Gondola
- Abner Biberman – Soak the Rich
- Veda Ann Borg – Three Cheers for Love
- Lloyd Bridges – Freshman Love
- J. Edward Bromberg – Under Two Flags
- Blanchette Brunoy – Counsel for Romance
- Peter Bull – The Secret Voice
- Esma Cannon – The Man Behind the Mask
- Cyril Chamberlain – The Man Behind the Mask
- Jerome Cowan – Beloved Enemy
- Janine Darcey – La tendre ennemie
- Don DeFore – Reunion
- Gloria DeHaven – Modern Times
- Eddie Dew – The Story of Louis Pasteur
- Leslie Dwyer – Cheer Up
- Frank Faylen – Road Gang
- Benson Fong – Charlie Chan at the Opera
- Louise Franklin – The Singing Kid
- Judy Garland – Pigskin Parade
- Beatrice Gray – Swing Time
- Ethel May Halls – The Milky Way
- Harry Hayden – I Married a Doctor
- Patricia Hayes – Broken Blossoms
- James Hayter – Sensation
- Van Heflin – A Woman Rebels
- Fay Helm – Fury
- Ronald Howard – Romeo and Juliet
- Zita Kabátová – Světlo jeho očí
- Daisuke Katō – Kōchiyama Sōshun
- Alma Kruger – These Three
- Joan Leslie – Camille
- Kay Linaker – The Murder of Dr. Harrigan
- Charles Lloyd-Pack – Calling the Tune
- George Lynn – Tough Guy
- Hugh Marlowe – Brilliant Marriage
- Tony Martin – Follow the Fleet
- Hugh McDermott – Well Done, Henry
- Mira McKinney – Modern Times
- Wayne Morris – China Clipper
- John Payne – Dodsworth
- Eva Puig – The Crime of Dr. Forbes
- Anthony Quinn – The Milky Way
- Martha Raye – Rhythm on the Range
- Michael Redgrave – Secret Agent
- Michael Rennie – Secret Agent
- Michael Ripper – Twice Branded
- Elizabeth Russell – Forgotten Faces
- Margaret Rutherford – Dusty Ermine
- Kent Smith – The Garden Murder Case
- Olga Solbelli – The Anonymous Roylott
- Madeleine Sologne – Life Belongs to Us
- Gale Sondergaard – Anthony Adverse
- Louise Stanley – Anything Goes
- Nigel Stock – The Man Who Could Work Miracles
- John Sutton – The House of a Thousand Candles
- Max Terhune – Ride Ranger Ride
- Beatrice Varley – Tomorrow We Live
- Marjorie Weaver – China Clipper
- Frank Wilcox – Postal Inspector
- Robert J. Wilke – San Francisco
- Ben Wright – The Avenging Hand
- William Wright – China Clipper
- Lillian Yarbo – Rainbow on the River
- Nietta Zocchi – But It's Nothing Serious
