= 1936 in the Soviet Union =

- Decades: 1920s; 1930s; 1940s; 1950s
- See also: History of the Soviet Union; List of years in the Soviet Union

The following lists events that happened during 1936 in the Union of Soviet Socialist Republics.

== Incumbents ==
- General Secretary of the Communist Party of the Soviet Union – Joseph Stalin
- Chairman of the Central Executive Committee of the Congress of Soviets – Mikhail Kalinin
- Chairman of the Council of People's Commissars of the Soviet Union – Vyacheslav Molotov

== Events ==
- August 19–24 – Trial of the Sixteen

=== Undated ===
- Stalin's Great Purges begin.
- Second Five-Year Plan underway

== Films ==
- By the Bluest of Seas – directed by Boris Barnet
- Circus – directed by Grigori Aleksandrov
- Girl Friends – directed by Lev Arnshtam

== Births ==
- 28 January - Bernara Karieva, Uzbekistani ballerina
- 2 June - Volodymyr Holubnychy, Ukrainian Olympic athlete (d. 2021)
- 15 June - Roman Kofman, Ukrainian musician (d. 2026)
- 22 June - Izatullo Khayoyev, 1st Prime Minister of Tajikistan (d. 2015)
- 7 July - Anatoly Kirov, Russian wrestler
- 17 July - Shota Shamatava, politician (d. 2013)
- 31 August – Igor Zhukov, Russian pianist (d. 2018)
- 1 September - Valery Legasov, Russian chemist (d. 1988)
- 21 September - Yury Luzhkov, mayor of Moscow (d. 2019)
- 8 October - Leonid Kuravlyov, Russian actor (d. 2022)
- 30 October
  - Polina Astakhova, Ukrainian gymnast (d. 2005)
  - Margarita Voites, Estonian soprano (d. 2024)
- 3 November — Anatoly Mikhaylov, Belarusian radiologist (d. 2026)

== Deaths ==
- August 22 – Mikhail Tomsky
- August 25 – Lev Kamenev, Grigory Zinoviev and Ivan Nikitich Smirnov

== See also ==
- 1936 in fine arts of the Soviet Union
- History of the Soviet Union (1927–1953)
- List of Soviet films of 1936
- Purges
- Soviet Union
