= Maria Blumenthal-Tamarina =

Soviet and Russian actress

- Мария Блюменталь-Тамарина
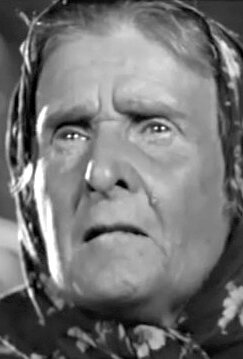
- Blumenthal-Tamarina in the film Peasants (1935)
- Born: Maria Mikhailovna Klimova; July 16, 1859; Saint Petersburg, Russian Empire
- Died: October 16, 1938 (aged 79); Moscow, Russian SFSR, Soviet Union
- Occupation: Actress

Maria Mikhailovna Blumenthal-Tamarina (Note: Russian: Мария Михайловна Блюменталь-Тамарина, romanized: Mariya Mikhaylovna Blyumental-Tamarina) (née Klimova; (Note: Russian: Мария Михайловна Климова, romanized: Mariya Mikhaylovna Klimova) 16 July 1859 – October 16, 1939), was a Soviet and Russian movie and theater actress. She was given the title of People's Artist of the USSR (1936) and was one of the first actresses to receive this honor. She was also recognized as Honored Artist of the Russian Soviet Federative Socialist Republic (also known as the RSFSR) in 1925 and People's Artist of RSFSR in 1928. She was also named a recipient of the Order of Lenin and the Order of the Red Banner of Labour.

== Biography ==
Maria Blumenthal-Tamarina's father, Mikhail, was born a serf. Maria graduated in 1875 from the Mariinsky de Saint-Petersburg gymnasium. In 1880, she married a drama teacher and actor named Alexander Eduardovich Blumenthal-Tamarin. Her stage debut was in 1885, when she became part of an amateur theater group. By 1887, she had appeared with a professional troupe in the Alexandre Dumas play Kean at Petrovsky Park in Moscow.

By 1889, she began working in the Mikhail Valentovich Lentovsky Theater Group (Лентовский, Михаил Валентинович). This troupe traveled throughout the Russian Empire between 1890 and 1901, reaching locations such as Tbilisi, Vladikavkaz, Rostov-on-Don, and Kharkiv. Upon returning to Moscow, Blumenthal-Tamarina worked at the Korsh Theatre, the Comedy Theater, the Soukhodolski Theater, and the Maly Drama Theatre (1933–1938). In 1911, she worked on the Boris Tchaikovsky (Чайковский, Борис Витальевич) silent movie The Living Corpse.

Throughout her career, Blumenthal-Tamarina appeared in over 20 films. In 1936, she performed the main role in the movie Seekers of Happiness, which tells the story of a Jewish family that moves to the Jewish colony of Birobidzhan

Maria Blumenthal-Tamarina was awarded the Order of Lenin and the Order of the Red Banner of Labour in 1937.

She died on October 16, 1938, in Moscow. She was buried in Novodevichy Cemetery.

== Filmography ==
- 1911: The Living Corpse (Живой труп [Zhivoi trup] at IMDb) by Boris Tchaikovsky: Lisa
- 1916: Merry Nursery Girl: Anna Markovna Kozelskaya
- 1916: Star Glistening in the Distance: Elisa's mother
- 1923: Brigade Commander Ivanov by Aleksandr Razumny: Deaconess
- 1923: On the Wings of the Sky!: Glagoleva's wife
- 1924: In the Wilds of Life: Grandmother
- 1925: The Road to Happiness: Arina
- 1925: His Call by Yakov Protazanov: Grandmother Katie
- 1925: Bricks: Sidorovna
- 1926: The Mighty: Mother of the character Stout
- 1926: The Driver Ukhtomsky: Sapozhnikov
- 1926: The Last Shot: Grandma Lukerya
- 1928: Don Diego and Pelagia by Yakov Protazanov: Pelagia Demina
- 1928: Vasilisina Victory: Grandmother Zaychikha
- 1928: Two Rivals: Mother Firsova
- 1928: The Seventh Satellite: Polinka
- 1928: For Your Health
- 1928: Sailor Ivan Galai: Mother of Galai
- 1932: Counterplan (Russian: Встречный, romanized: Vstrechny) by Fridrikh Ermler and Sergei Ioutkevitch: Babtchikha
- 1933: The International
- 1934: Peasants: Collective Farmer
- 1935: Zoya's Friends
- 1936: Girl Friends (Russian: Подруги, romanized: Podrugi) by Lev Arnshtam: Fekla Petrovna
- 1936: Seekers of Happiness (Russian: Искатели счастья, romanized: iskatel schastya) by Vladimir Korsh-Sablin (Корш-Саблин, Владимир Владимирович) and Joseph Shapiro (also Iosif Shapiro or Chapiro) (Шапиро, Иосиф Соломонович (кинорежиссёр)): Dvora
- 1937: Daughter of the Motherland: Grandma Martha
- 1938: The New Moscow: Grandmother
