= Agvaantseren =

Agvaantseren may refer to:

- Agvaantserengiin Enkhtaivan (born 1958), Mongolian music composer and film maker
- Bayarjargal Agvaantseren (born 1969), Mongolian conservationist
