= China Express =

China Express may refer to the following:

- China Express Airlines, a Chinese airline founded in 2006 with a focus on regional flights.
- The Blue Express, a 1929 Soviet silent drama film known also as China Express.
