= Luvsansharav =

Luvsansharav (Mongolian: Лувсаншарав) is a Mongolian personal name.

Notable people with the name include:

as proper name

- Dagvyn Luvsansharav (1927–2014), Mongolian composer
- Dorjjavyn Luvsansharav (1900–1941), Mongolian communist

as patronymic

- Luvsansharavyn Tsend (1940–2023), Mongolian former speedskater
