= 1936 in fine arts of the Soviet Union =

The year 1936 was marked by many events that left an imprint on the history of Soviet and Russian fine arts.

== Events ==
- The first graduates of the Academy of Fine Arts after its reorganization in the Leningrad Institute of Painting, Sculpture, and Architecture under the All-Russian Academy of Arts.
- Retrospective Exhibition of works by Kuzma Petrov-Vodkin was opened in Moscow and in Leningrad.
- November 17 — The Autumn Exhibition of Leningrad artists was opened in Russian museum. The participants were Victor Oreshnikov, Alexander Samokhvalov, Samuil Nevelshtein, Nikolai Kostrov, and other important Leningrad artists.

== Births ==
- March 7 — Tamara Polosatova (Russian: Полосатова Тамара Владимировна), Russian Soviet painter.
- March 16 — Boris Kuznetsov (Russian: Кузнецов Борис Николаевич), Russian Soviet painter.
- December 31 — Victor Korovin (Russian: Коровин Виктор Иванович), Russian Soviet painter.

== Deaths ==
- February 23 — Sergey Chekhonin (Russian: Чехонин Сергей Васильевич), Russian Soviet graphic artist (b. 1878)
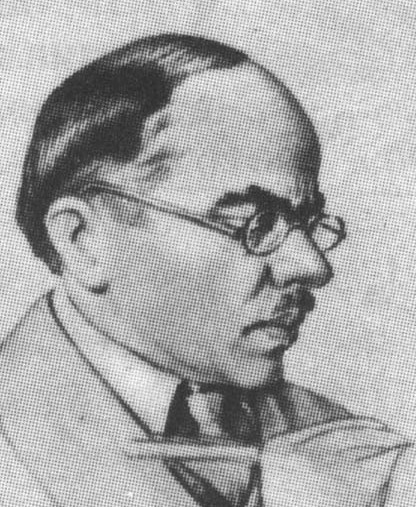
Sergey Chekhonin

== See also ==
- List of Russian artists
- List of painters of Leningrad Union of Artists
- Saint Petersburg Union of Artists
- Russian culture
- 1936 in the Soviet Union

== Sources ==
- Выставка произведений К. С. Петрова-Водкина. Л., Искусство, 1936.
- Каталог первой выставки ленинградских художников. Л., Искусство, 1935.
- Artists of Peoples of the USSR. Biobibliography Dictionary. Vol. 1. Moscow, Iskusstvo, 1970.
- Artists of Peoples of the USSR. Biobibliography Dictionary. Vol. 2. Moscow, Iskusstvo, 1972.
- Directory of Members of Union of Artists of USSR. Volume 1,2. Moscow, Soviet Artist Edition, 1979.
- Directory of Members of the Leningrad branch of the Union of Artists of Russian Federation. Leningrad, Khudozhnik RSFSR, 1980.
- Artists of Peoples of the USSR. Biobibliography Dictionary. Vol. 4 Book 1. Moscow, Iskusstvo, 1983.
- Directory of Members of the Leningrad branch of the Union of Artists of Russian Federation. Leningrad, Khudozhnik RSFSR, 1987.
- Персональные и групповые выставки советских художников. 1917-1947 гг. М., Советский художник, 1989.
- Artists of peoples of the USSR. Biobibliography Dictionary. Vol. 4 Book 2. Saint Petersburg: Academic project humanitarian agency, 1995.
- Link of Times: 1932 – 1997. Artists – Members of Saint Petersburg Union of Artists of Russia. Exhibition catalogue. Saint Petersburg, Manezh Central Exhibition Hall, 1997.
- Matthew C. Bown. Dictionary of 20th Century Russian and Soviet Painters 1900-1980s. London, Izomar, 1998.
- Vern G. Swanson. Soviet Impressionism. – Woodbridge, England: Antique Collectors' Club, 2001.
- Sergei V. Ivanov. Unknown Socialist Realism. The Leningrad School. Saint-Petersburg, NP-Print Edition, 2007. ISBN 5901724216, ISBN 9785901724217.
- Anniversary Directory graduates of Saint Petersburg State Academic Institute of Painting, Sculpture, and Architecture named after Ilya Repin, Russian Academy of Arts. 1915 – 2005. Saint Petersburg, Pervotsvet Publishing House, 2007.
