= Aravt =

2012 Mongolian epic historical drama

- Directed by: I. Shagdarsuren, D. Zolbayar
- Screenplay by: O. Erdene
- Produced by: I. Shagdarsuren
- Starring: Batdorj-in BaasanjabDogmid SosorbaramBaljinnyamyn Amarsaikhan
- Cinematography: Battulga, Khasbold
- Edited by: J. Tsog
- Music by: Batmunkh Chinbat
- Release date: 2012
- Running time: 90 Minutes
- Country: Mongolia
- Language: Mongolian

Aravt (Mongolian: Аравт or Genghis: The Legend of the Ten (Aravt) is a 2012 Mongolian epic historical drama. The plots revolves around ten ordinary Mongol soldiers of the early 13th century and their search of an old physician of the Qori Tumad in Siberia.

== Reception ==
The film received mixed review from critics. The film is loosely based on historical events and depicts highly fictional characters. There is only one character of Dorbei Doqshin is based on a real-life person. James Cansdale-Cook praised the film's connection to nomadic folklore and tradition.
