= The New Moscow =

- Russian: Новая Москва
- Directed by: Aleksandr Medvedkin; Aleksandr Olenin
- Written by: Aleksandr Medvedkin
- Produced by: F. Zakatov; V. Gutin
- Starring: Daniil Sagal; Nina Alisova; Mariya Barabanova; Maria Blumenthal-Tamarina; Pavel Sukhanov
- Cinematography: Igor Gelein
- Edited by: Tatiana Likhacheva
- Music by: Vladimir Yurovskiy
- Production company: Mosfilm
- Release date: 1938
- Running time: 100 min.
- Country: Soviet Union
- Language: Russian

The New Moscow (Russian: Новая Москва, romanized: Novaya Moskva) is a 1938 Soviet sci-fi comedy film directed by Aleksandr Medvedkin and Aleksandr Olenin. It was banned from showing by Joseph Stalin.

== Plot ==
The film tells about the adventures of the young designer Alyosha, who made a living model of the future capital of the Soviet Union, his relationship with his beloved girlfriend Zoya and the relations between the painter Fedya and the pig-tender Olya.

Accompanied by his grandmother, Alyosha travels to Moscow to display his model at a prestigious show.

== Cast ==
- Daniil Sagal as Alyosha
- Nina Alisova as Zoya
- Mariya Barabanova as Olya
- Nikolay Pajitnov as Misha Kozhevnikov
- Pavel Sukhanov as Fedya Utin
- Maria Blumenthal-Tamarina as granny
- Aleksandr Grave as student (uncredited)
- Karandash as cameo
- Lidiya Smirnova as a girl (uncredited)

Film online
