= Happiness (1935 film) =

- Happiness
- Directed by: Aleksandr Medvedkin
- Written by: Aleksandr Medvedkin
- Starring: Pyotr Zinovyev; Yelena Yegorova
- Release date: March 15, 1935
- Running time: 99 minutes West German TV cut: 66 minutes
- Country: Soviet Union
- Languages: Silent film Russian intertitles

Happiness (Russian: Счастье, romanized: Schastye) is a 1935 silent satirical slapstick (or rather lubok) comedy set in the Russian Empire before the October Revolution and in the Soviet Union at the time of the collectivization. Medvedkin's original title was The Snatchers or The Possessors (Стяжатели).

The original print featured an experimental color sequence illustrating a poor peasant's dreams of becoming a king. It was the first color production of the Mosfilm studio. According to Medvedkin, "At that time the peasant could not dream of anything multicoloured of beautiful. His dream was limited, and in that the technology helped". The sequence was discarded on account of its poor technical quality and is apparently lost.

Unnoticed on its release, Happiness became well known in the 1960s among film scholars. It was especially championed by Chris Marker who included some excerpts from Happiness in his 1992 documentary The Last Bolshevik.

== Plot ==
After the death of the grandfather, who died after witnessing their wealthy neighbor Foka feasting, and subsequently being caught trying to steal from him, farmer Chmyr is sent away by his wife, Anna, to seek his fortune.

A priest and a nun find a wallet full of money on a bridge, which a merchant had dropped on his way back from the fair. They both fight over the find. Chmyr, who arrives, secretly takes the money without the brawlers noticing him.

With the money, Chmyr buys a spotted horse that eats the straw off his roof. When it's time to harness it for plowing, the horse collapses. When Anna harnesses herself to the plow instead, she too collapses. Neighbor Foka accuses Chmyr of being a slave driver. But when it's time to bring in the harvest, the priest, the nun, gendarmes, and officers arrive to collect their tithe. Khmyr's harvest is carted away from the farm in full wagons. When two thieves sneak onto the farm that night to break into the chests secured with heavy locks, there's nothing left to steal. Out of pity, they give Khmyr, who arrives on the scene, a ruble and ten kopeks.

In despair, Khmyr decides to die. He's already begun to build himself a coffin when the priest and the policeman reprimand him. If the farmer dies, they say, who will feed Russia? Hussars and officers then occupy the farm, and soldiers seize Khmyr and arrest him. Anna, who tries to free him, is pushed away.

Years have passed.

Hkhmyr sits on the driver's seat of the tanker truck. Now he's a water carrier for the collective farm (a kolkhoz), while his wife Anna sits behind the wheel of a tractor. It needs water to cool its overheated engine. But Khmyr has fallen asleep on the driver's seat. Neighbor Foka distracts a tractor driver who is supposed to bring help with a vodka breakfast. Eventually, the tractor goes out of control and rolls toward a precipice. Foka jumps on and stops it.

Chmyr is given a rifle and assigned to guard the collective farm's harvest. The two thieves, along with the priest and the nun, decide to rob the granary. Chmyr doesn't notice; only when the thief drills holes in the granary floor with a large drill does he go for it with his rifle, but he doesn't know how to catch the thief. Neighbor Foka distracts Chmyr by pointing out a sheep in the pumpkin patch. Meanwhile, the thieves carry the entire granary away. Chmyr notices nothing. When he turns around, it's gone. Startled, he jumps up and is locked in by the thieves.

Anna sees the granary being carried away. With the overseer and the other collective farm workers, they recapture it and free Chmyr. The overseer takes back the rifle he couldn't handle. Anna (in the intertitle): "Go away, Chmyr! You'll never be an honest man!" Chmyr is ashamed.

Spring arrives. An intertitle warns: "We're preparing the horses for sowing!" But Foka wants to sabotage the work and set fire to the stables. Chmyr tries to stop him. He stamps out the fire, wrestles with Foka, and is overpowered. Foka sets the stables ablaze, but Chmyr manages to rescue the horses from the already burning barns. In doing so, he is struck by a beam and falls unconscious. Meanwhile, the overseer has alerted the collective farm workers. Chmyr is rescued. When he awakens, he points at Foka: He's the arsonist. The collective farm workers seize Foka.

Chmyr is getting new clothes in town. He keeps his old things in a bundle that, in a way, contains his past. His attempts to get rid of it fail, because the shopkeeper, the tailor, and the policeman all want to give it back to him. Even the two thieves who sneak up behind him no longer want the clothes and throw them away. Chmyr, dressed in modern clothes, including a flat cap, and his Anna watch and laugh.

== Cast ==
- Piotr Zinoviev: Chmyr, a poor farmer
- Ielena Iegorova: Anna Chmyrja, his wife
- Mikhaïl Gipsi: Taras Platonowitsch Foka, the rich neighbour
- Lidia Nenacheva: Nun
- Nikolaï Cherkasov: Saboteur
