= Cinetrain =

Soviet documentary film project

An example of a Cinetrain film

Cinetrain or cine-train was a documentary film project conducted across the Soviet Union in the late 1920s by director Aleksandr Medvedkin. All 60 films created in Cinetrain were considered lost until 1980, when some of them were discovered in the archives of film historian Nikolai Izvolov.

Medvedkin outfitted three railroad cars to house his production crew and a lab for rapid developing, processing and assembly of films during the first Five Year Plan. His goal was to travel around the country, creating and exhibiting documentary films as quickly as possible. One of the wagons was installed as a movie trailer.

Cinetrain made "sweeping raids shock construction projects Five Year Plan".

The film is in one box! Acute! Taking her heart! Made quickly, he must cling to the big screen thriller as a burr in the dog's tail and go with him on any road film distribution.

The severity of raised topics and timely responses allow you to put shorts Medvedkin on a par with modern telehronikoy: "Arriving at an ordinary object, it is the move to remove" hot "subjects, they immediately showed, mounted and on the same day, or at least the next demonstrated at a local club or theatre, to the indescribable delight of the audience ". The idea was, by exposing shortcomings, to convince the audience of the need to improve the production process.

The cinetrain provoked a lively response among the French left in the 1960s. Members of the Medvedkino group, led by Chris Marker, perceived Medvedkin as the "Che Guevara of cinema" - "an enthusiastic militant propagandist, created in an almost partisan style, in the shortest possible time and on the spot."
