= Shota Shamatava =

Abkhaz politician (1936–2013)

Shota Nikolaevich Shamatava (Russian: Шота Николаевич Шаматава; 17 July 1936 – 28 October 2013) was an Abkhaz politician who served in the People's Assembly of Abkhazia from 1996 to 2002. A member of the second convocation of the People's Assembly, he was elected in the Chuburkhinji constituency (Constituency No. 33) in November 1996 after the citrus farm Apsny had nominated his candidacy. Prior to entering parliament, he had been mayor of the village of Okumi in the Tkvarcheli District. Shamatava died on 28 October 2013 in Sukhumi.
