= Urgoo Cinema =

Movie theater in Ulaanbaatar, Mongolia

Coordinates: 47°55′24″N 106°52′29″E

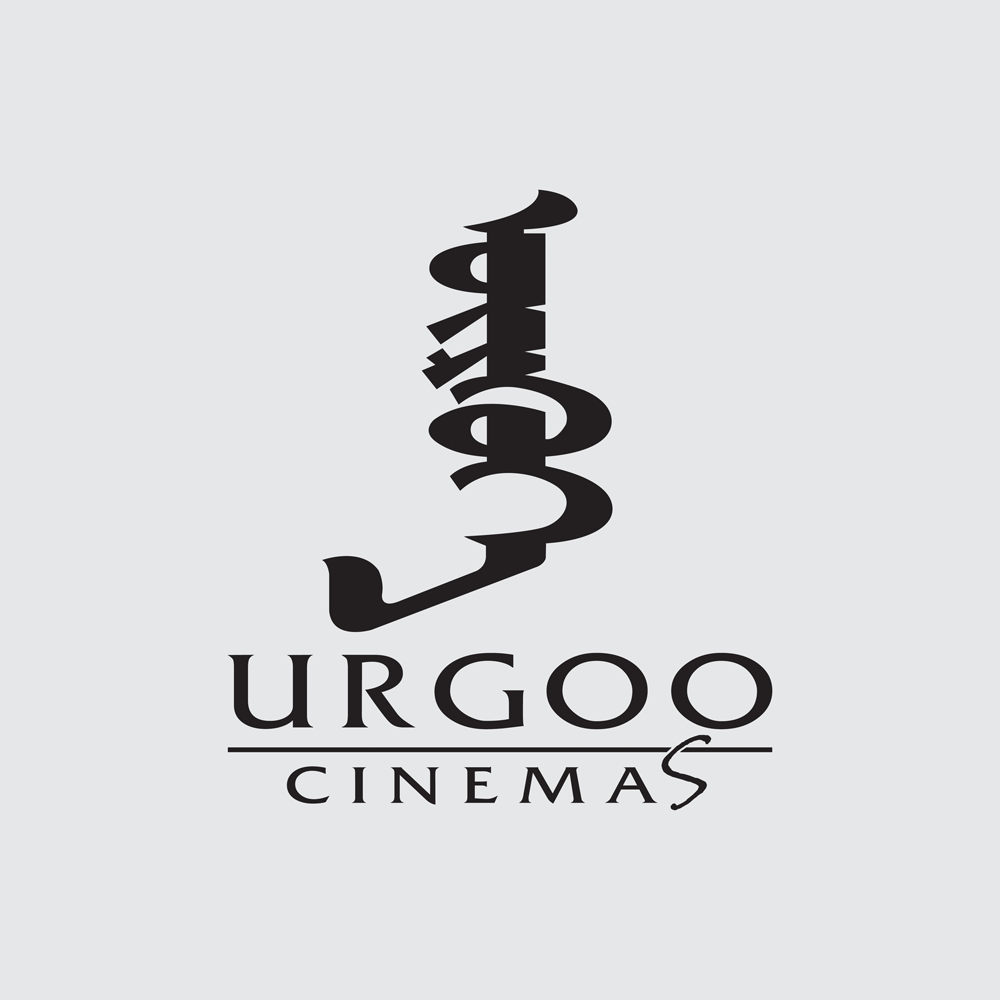

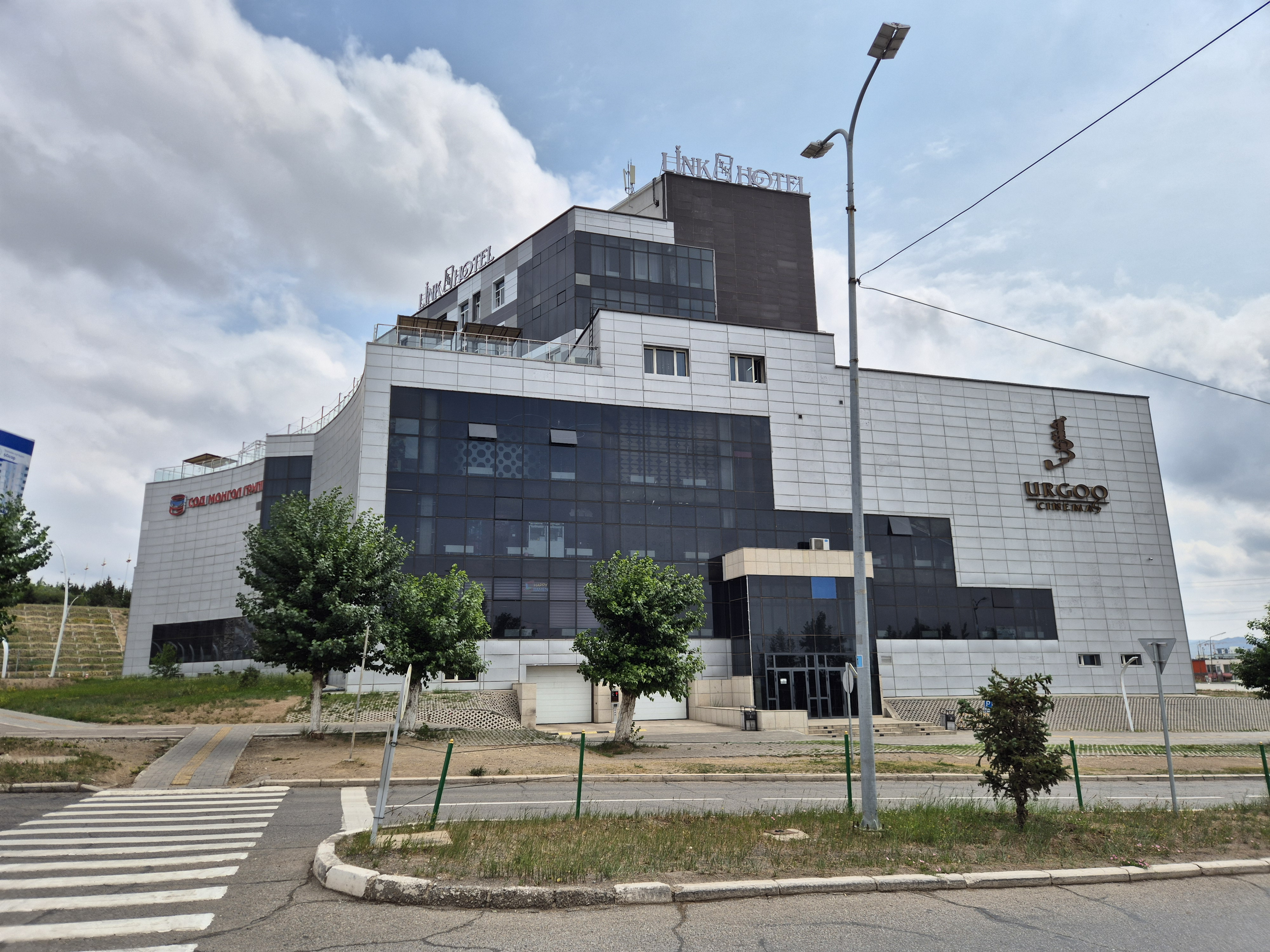
- Urgoo Cinema in Darkhan
- Native name: Өргөө Синема
- Industry: movie theater
- Founded: 1987
- Area served: Mongolia
- Website: Official website

Urgoo Cinema (Mongolian: Өргөө Синема, Palace Cinema) is a cinema chain in Mongolia, one of the main movie theaters in the country.

The cinema was first founded in 1987 by Mosproekt of the Soviet Union. After privatization, it was owned from 1998 to 2006 by New Tour Safaris, but declining audiences led to it closing. In 2007, renovation of the building and technology began on the recommendation of Warner Bros. International Cinema and with the investments of Urgoo Cinema Co. On 17 April 2009, the new cinema opened, and now shows international and domestic films on five screens daily.
