= Fay Webb =

American actress

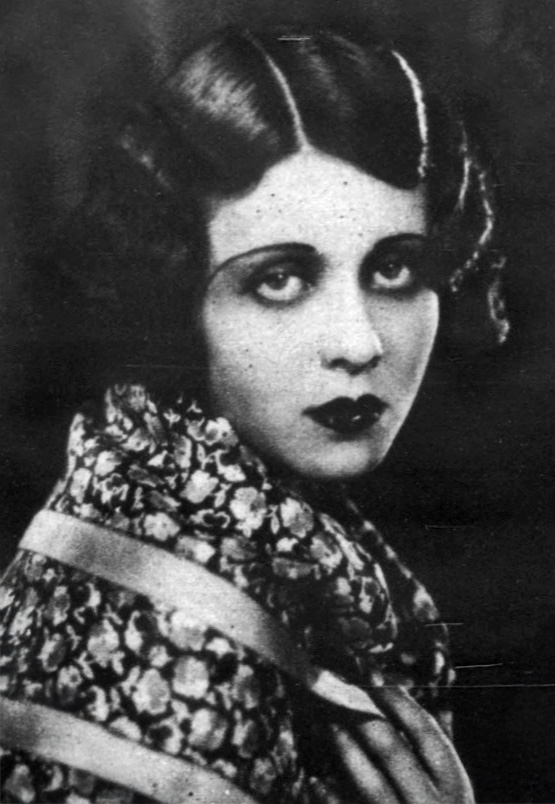
- Webb around 1928
- Born: Fay Naomi Webb; 1907; United States
- Died: November 18, 1936 (aged 28–29); California, United States
- Occupation: Actress
- Years active: 1927–1936
- Spouse: Rudy Vallée (m. 1931–1936)

Fay Webb (1907 – 18 November 1936) was an American actress who gained recognition through her marriage to singer and bandleader Rudy Vallée. After graduating from Santa Monica High School in 1927, Webb was signed by MGM Studios, where she began taking dramatic and acting courses. After meeting Vallée through mutual friends in 1929, the couple secretly married in July 1931, but by the second year, their relationship showed signs of strain. Despite attempts to reconcile, they officially separated in April 1933 and finalized their divorce in May 1936. During their divorce, both accused each other of infidelity and abusive behavior, although the judge ultimately ruled in Vallée's favor.

Despite their rocky relationship, Vallée had provided financial support to Webb after her mother's death. Webb died in November 1936 at the age of 29 from peritonitis following abdominal surgery.

== Early life and career ==
From a young age, Webb showed a passion in dancing and swimming, and secured small film roles following her graduation from Santa Monica High School in summer 1927. She was signed by MGM Studios in July 1927, reportedly due to her attractiveness, however the studio anticipated that she would need to undertake a course in dramatics and acting before being considered for significant film roles.

== Marriage to Rudy Vallée ==
Webb and Rudy Vallée met around 1929, with Webb being a fan of his music prior to their introduction through mutual friends. Despite rumors of marriage reported in late 1929, which were refuted by Webb's father, the couple did secretly marry in July 1931. Webb was also known to accompany Vallée on his nationwide tours with his orchestra. Despite their romantic beginning, by the second year of their marriage, tensions had surfaced. Vallée's attorney confirmed that they were experiencing marital difficulties but noted that Vallée was attempting to reconcile. His attorney's demeanor was one of "great sadness", contrasting with the enthusiasm he had expressed about the couples' nuptials just a year earlier. With suggestions of a divorce increasing in likelihood by late 1932, Webb declared they had reconciled after a "sudden difference of temperament" and criticized the newspapers for hyping divorce rumors, asserting that Vallée never wanted to divorce her.

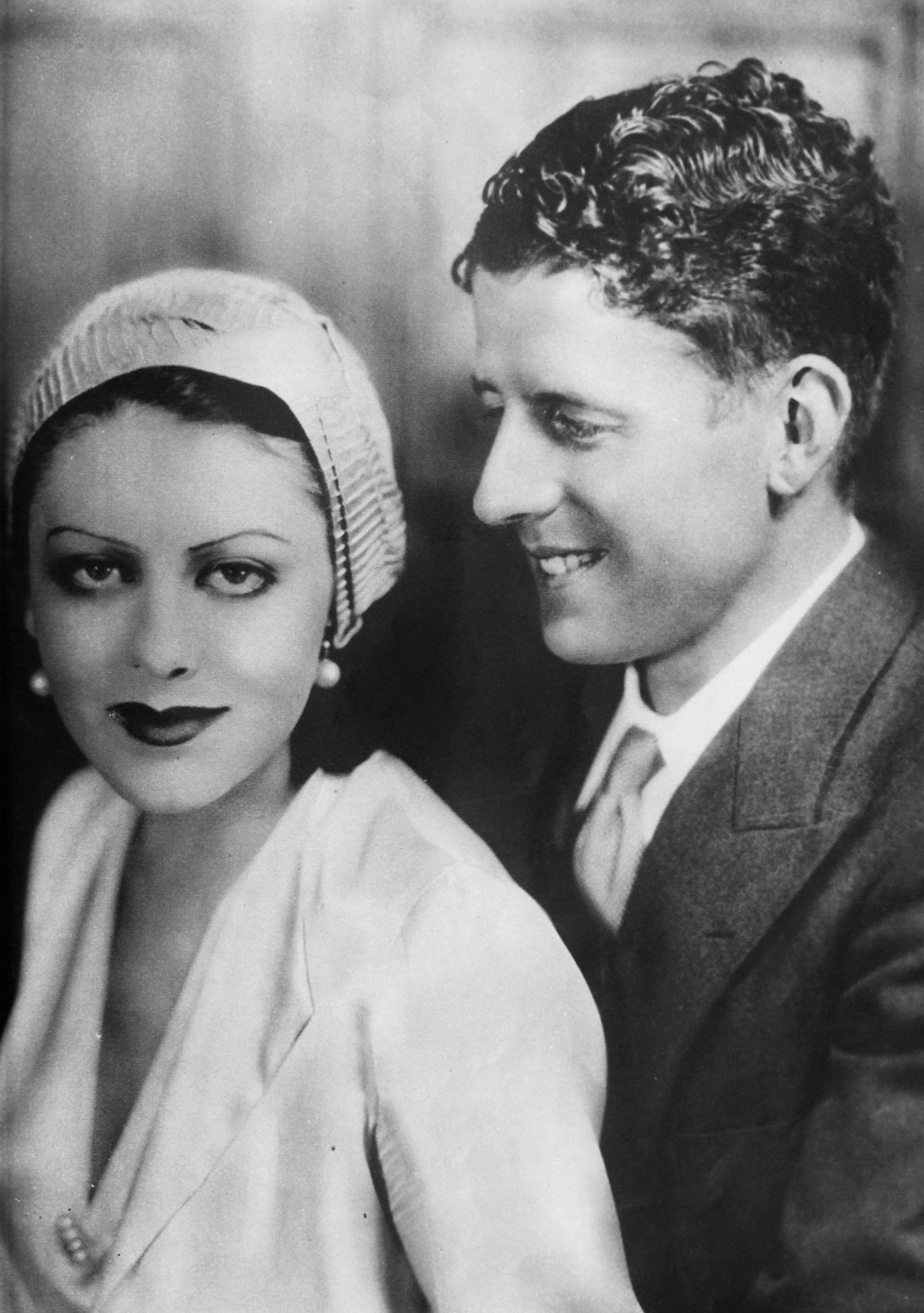
Webb and Vallée, around late 1931

Despite her optimistic statements, the reconciliation was short-lived. Webb's feelings towards Vallée fluctuated over the years, on one occasion remarking that Vallée was "wonderful, but we just couldn't get along." Vallée later remarked that during their marriage, which brought him no additional fame or fortune, Webb made four trips to California, often leaving him alone for months at a time. People who worked with him in radio observed a noticeable change in his behavior and morale, as he progressively began to prefer spending time alone with his saxophone.

=== Separation and divorce ===
The couple officially separated in April 1933, signing a separation agreement in Vallée's attorney's office. The agreement granted each party freedom concerning future actions but included clauses preventing either from discussing their marital issues publicly or Webb from participating in productions about their married life. Vallée retained the title deeds to their $80,000 house in California. Seven months after the separation, Webb sought to void the agreement to initiate legal action against Vallée. In 1934, following the death of her mother and the assumption of her mother's debts, Vallée voluntarily gave Webb a one-time sum of $25,000 to assist with her financial struggles.

During their divorce proceedings, Webb accused Vallée of having a violent temper and using abusive language. She also alleged that he had committed adultery with three women, including actress Alice Faye. Vallée denied these allegations and countered with accusations of infidelity on Webb's part. The judge ruled in Vallée's favor, stating he was "not guilty of any misconduct or maltreatment of Webb." The divorce was finalized in May 1936. Webb's attempt to increase her $100 weekly allowance was unsuccessful, as she had initially requested $7,450 per month. Vallée refused to meet her demands, citing his upbringing and principles that someone who had wronged him did not deserve a reward.

== Death ==
Webb died in November 1936, aged 29, from peritonitis following abdominal surgery. She died in hospital with her father by her side, after being in a coma for nearly two days.
