= The Last Bolshevik =

1992 film

- Directed by: Chris Marker
- Written by: Chris Marker
- Produced by: Michael Kustow
- Starring: Léonor Graser
- Cinematography: Chris Marker
- Edited by: Chris Marker
- Release date: 1992
- Running time: 120 minutes
- Country: France
- Language: French

The Last Bolshevik (French: Le Tombeau d'Alexandre) is a 1992 French documentary film about director Aleksandr Medvedkin, directed by Chris Marker.

== Cast ==
- Léonor Graser as Dinosaur girl
- Nikolai Izvolov as Guest
- Kira Paramonova as Guest
- Viktor Dyomin as Guest (as Viktor Diomen)
- Yuli Raizman as Guest
- Marina Kalasieva as Guest
- Aleksandr Medvedkin as Himself (archive footage)
- Lev Rochal as Guest
- Vladimir Dmitriyev as Guest (as Vladimir Dimitriev)
- Antonina Pirojkova as Guest
- Albert Schulte as Interviewee
- Rhona Campbell as Guest
- Marina Goldovskaya as Guest
- Yakov Tolchan as Guest
- Sofia Prituliak as Guest
- Yuri Kolyada as Guest
- Michael Pennington as Voice (voice)
