= Summer with Extra Month =

Summer With Extra Month
- Directed by: J. Selengesüren
- Screenplay by: B. Baljinnyam
- Based on: novel by S. Jargalsaikhan
- Produced by: N. Zundui
- Starring: D. Sosorbaram; O. Oyun; S. Selenge
- Cinematography: P. Boldbaatar
- Edited by: D. Batbayar
- Music by: B. Sharav
- Distributed by: Mongol Kino
- Release date: 1987
- Running time: 100 minutes
- Country: Mongolia
- Language: Mongol

Summer With Extra Month (Mongolian: Илүү сартай зун, romanized: Ilüü sartai zun) is a 1987 Mongolian romantic film based on the novel of Sorogdogiin Jargalsaikhan. The film was directed by Jamyansürengiin Selengesüren and starred Dogmidyn Sosorbaram, Ochibatyn Oyun and Sevjidiin Selenge. The story depicts the life of Galaa, a native of Lake Khövsgol, a blusterous, helpful young man set in the background of the late 1980s in the Mongolia.

== Cast ==
- Dogmidyn Sosorbaram as Galbadrakh (Galaa)
- Ochirbatyn Oyun as Ariunaa
- Sevjidiin Selenge as Davaajav
- J. Jigjiddulam as Serchmaa
- Nasanbayaryn Nergüibaatar as Dagva
- B. Chuluuntsend as Dorjbat
