= By the Bluest of Seas =

1936 film

- DVD cover
- У самого синего моря
- Directed by: Boris Barnet; Samad Mardanov
- Written by: Klimentiy Mints
- Starring: Yelena Kuzmina; Nikolai Kryuchkov
- Cinematography: Mikhail Kirillov
- Music by: Sergei Pototsky
- Production companies: Mezhrabpomfilm; Azerfilm
- Release date: 20 April 1936 (Soviet Union)
- Running time: 72 minutes
- Country: Soviet Union
- Language: Russian

By the Bluest of Seas (Russian: У самого синего моря, romanized: U samogo sinego morya) is a 1936 Soviet romantic comedy-drama film by Russian director Boris Barnet. It is his second sound feature. Starring Yelena Kuzmina, Nikolai Kryuchkov, and Lev Sverdlin, the story centers on a love triangle between two castaways and a woman from a collective farm on a Soviet Azerbaijani island in the Caspian Sea.

Modern critical reviews have hailed By the Bluest of Seas as a little-known classic of Soviet cinema. Although some critics have noted that the story and characters are thinly written, high praise has been directed toward Barnet's direction and cinematography, his innovative use of sound, and the film's footage of the Caspian Sea. Some have perceived pro-communist propaganda within the film. However, many consider the film to be less politically overt than was common in Soviet cinema of the time. This, along with the film's divergence from the era's defining style of Socialist realism, has led many to view the film as unique. It has been reported that Barnet found himself in trouble with Joseph Stalin for these reasons.

The film has long been elusive to Western audiences. It was never released on any home media format, until 2012, at which point it was made available by the Russian publisher Ruscico and the UK publisher Mr. Bongo Films.

== Plot ==
After their ship is capsized by a storm in the Caspian Sea, sailor Yussuf and mechanic Alyosha cling to the wreckage. On their third day adrift, the castaways are rescued by fishermen. Taken to a nearby island off the coast of Soviet Azerbaijan, Yussuf and Alyosha are welcomed into the local Lights of Communism collective farm. The two men are smitten by a woman named Mariya. As Alyosha explores the island, he separates from his friend and happens across Mariya alone. Introducing themselves, each is in for a surprise. Mariya is, in fact, a leader of the collective. She is delighted to learn of Alyosha's profession, as all of the island's mechanics have left to serve in the Pacific Fleet. In their absence, Mariya had feared that the collective's fishing operations would have been disrupted. Alyosha promises to stay for the entire season, and going off to inspect a motor boat together, the two engage in flirtatious behavior. However, Yussuf soon joins the pair and grows jealous.

As time passes, Alyosha and Yussuf prove their usefulness. They venture out on all of the collective's fishing expeditions, until one day, Alyosha claims heart sickness. Yussuf is incredulous. Unable to coax his friend along, Yussuf leaves Alyosha behind. As soon as the boat sets out however, Alyosha leaves the island on his own, having faked the illness. He goes to a nearby town, and that night, brings gifts back to Mariya. When Yussuf discovers this act of deceit, he condemns his friend before a public gathering.

On their final day at sea, Alyosha acknowledges his disgrace and concedes that Yussuf should be the one to marry Mariya. Yussuf takes joy in this and proclaims his intent to do so. However, when he realizes that his friend has not truly let go of Mariya, he backs down out of pity. An argument erupts between the two in the ship's cabin. Meanwhile, a violent storm is brewing outside. Mariya, who has been on the top deck, is knocked overboard. Although Alyosha dives in after her, and is soon followed by Yussuf, neither is able to find her. She has been swept away.

Back on shore, Yussuf and Alyosha silently mourn for their lost loved one, until noticing that she has been carried back by the waves. Maryia had been wearing a life preserver. She is unharmed. The three burst in on what had been her premature funeral, turning it into a celebration. While Yussuf is being detained by the peoples' gratitude, Alyosha takes advantage of the situation to slip away with Mariya. Alone together, he professes his love for her, and yet is faced with rejection. Dismayed, he leaves before Mariya is able to offer an explanation. Alyosha then comes across Yussuf, and supposing that Mariya must love his friend instead, sullenly tells Yussuf that he should go to her. However, Yussuf is met with heartbreak as well. Mariya, it turns out, already has a fiancé, who is serving in the Pacific Fleet. She entreats Yussuf to imagine himself being called into service by commanding military officer Kliment Voroshilov, and how devastating it would be to discover that the woman he loves has grown tired of awaiting his return. Although Yussuf declares that this revelation does nothing to temper his passionate feelings, he acknowledges the virtue in Mariya's decision to remain faithful to her fiancé. Walking down to the beach, they see that a grief-stricken Alyosha has begun to set out for sea, preparing to return home alone. Yussuf calls out to his friend and joins him for the voyage. Upon hearing of Mariya's betrothment from Yussuf, Alyosha is at first unsympathetic. However, Yussuf echoes Mariya's entreaty for understanding. In a display of solidarity with Mariya, the two sail away while singing of a woman who awaits her loved one's return from sea.

== Main cast ==
- Yelena Kuzmina - Mariya
- Nikolai Kryuchkov - Alyosha
- Lev Sverdlin - Yussuf
- Semyon Svashenko
- Sergei Komarov
- Lyalya Sateyeva
- Andrei Dolinin
- Aleksandr Zhukov

== Reception ==
Although contemporaneous reviews dismissed the film as being "overly emotional", and director Boris Barnet was reportedly ashamed of his own body of work, many have since come to herald Barnet as one of the greatest directors of the Soviet era. By the Bluest of Seas is generally regarded as one of Barnet's best films. Jonathan Rosenbaum of the Chicago Reader has called it a masterpiece, and Patrick Friel of Film Comment wrote that the film is "one of the glories of Soviet cinema".

By 2004, By the Bluest of Seas had not yet been released on any kind of home media. In what was a rare opportunity of the time, Rosenbaum was able to see the film at a screening held by Facets Cinémathèque, as a part of a retrospective titled "The Extraordinary Mr. Barnet". Rosenbaum pointed to this screening as proof that many of the world's important films had not yet been made readily available to the public. In a perfect four-star review, he praised By the Bluest of Seas as an exquisite piece of filmmaking, yet one bearing qualities that are difficult to articulate. He drew a comparison with Raoul Walsh's comedies of the same era, writing that both Walsh and Barnet were skilled in crafting characters that earn the audience's affection. "The characters and their quirks", wrote Rosenbaum, are at the center of the film's appeal. However, he also noted that Barnet's film is imbued with "a sense of melancholy", one "quintessentially Russian" and constantly present underneath the film's joyful surface. This, he pointed out, is an element "quite foreign" to the works of the American Walsh.

"It somehow defies credibility...But Barnet pulls it off because the naive duo and their love interest are all believably portrayed as pure Soviet bumpkins"

— Dennis Schwartz of Ozus' World Movie Reviews

Dennis Schwartz of Ozus' World Movie Reviews also noticed a dichotomy within the film's tone, writing both that the film is "strangely uplifting" and that it contains "some darker moments to reflect on." He furthered his examination to other areas, asserting that outbreaks of song come across as both random and "natural", and that the story's resolution works despite being contrived. He gave the film an A. Friel (from Film Comment) went so far as to call the film's tone "carefree" and "almost reckless". Yet, he contended that all the various elements converge to create "an out-of-time fable-like quality". He saw similarities between By the Bluest of Seas and Aleksandr Medvedkin's Happiness from two years prior. Although Happiness contains a "surreal strangeness" absent from Barnet's work, both films, wrote Friel, eschew the "government-sanctioned social realism" that defined the era of Soviet filmmaking in which they were made, in favor of a more "joyous" and "playful" tone. Rosenbaum has voiced similar sentiments, writing that "Barnet was too instinctive and physical a director to fit comfortably within any prescribed form of socialist realism".

Allegations of propaganda have occasionally been made about the film's message — a message described by Anthony Nield of the Digital Fix as "a paean to communism and collectivism". However, Nield and Rosenbaum have both argued that propaganda, while present, is not central to Barnet's filmmaking style. In a seven out of ten star review, Nield suggested that Barnet's focus rather lay with technique and the romantic entanglement of the film's main characters. Ben Nicholson of Cine-Vue gave the film three out of five stars, and went so far as to write that propaganda is essentially absent from the film. This, he contended, makes By the Bluest of Seas an "anomaly" in the politically bent history of Soviet cinema. These stringent expectations of conformity caused problems for Barnet, who purportedly drew the ire of Joseph Stalin. According to Rosenbaum, Barnet's attempt at propaganda in this film may have been deemed "politically incorrect" by the Soviet bureaucracy.

"It is the relationships between this woman and the two newcomers which fascinates him, not so much the political messaging that needs to be espoused at regular intervals. It is this which fuels his visual and aural flourishes, to the point where they can transcend the social realism demanded of this kind of Soviet cinema."

— Anthony Nield of The Digital Fix

Much praise has been directed toward the film's footage of the Caspian Sea. Rosenbaum largely credited the film's appeal to its "idyllic setting", Nield called Barnet's use of scenery, taken with the film's musical score, "continually remarkable", and French film producer Dominique Païni has even said that the beauty of the opening scene has given him an erection. The sea's sexual resonance was on Rosenbaum's mind as well, upon a second viewing. Noting the views of Luc Moullet, who contended that eroticism is always linked together with right wing ideology, Rosenbaum countered that By the Bluest of Seas successfully sexualizes the left-wing ideologies of collectivism and socialism, and dubbed the Caspian Sea, "a perfect emotional metaphor" for this. Writing that the sea's "force and beauty" represents the turbulent emotions of the characters, Friel agreed that symbolic meaning can be seen the film's use of the Caspian Sea.

Despite the film's general acclaim, it has not fully escaped modern criticism. Nield and Nicholson both felt that the film is more of a cinematic achievement than an emotional one. The set-up was deemed "flimsy" by Nield, who wrote that the film's story is eclipsed by other elements, while Nicholson wrote that little attempt is made by the film to develop its characters. Although the film has been labelled a comedic melodrama, Nield took issue with this description, writing that the film's humor is not "persistent enough to have a genuine effect." He suggested that the comedy genre is applicable, only because the romantic triangle is too "lightweight" for the drama to "command our attention". Rosenbaum agreed that the film should not be strictly seen as a comedy, but went no further in airing criticism against the film than calling it "seemingly light". Although Nield wrote that the film does not "quite satisfy as fully as it should", he suggested that one can still easily appreciate the film, especially when approaching it as a "visual poem", rather than focusing intently on the storytelling.

Nield also emphasized the film's value as an early work of the sound era, calling it both "inventive" and "experimental". He pointed to a segment in which the audio drops out, creating a heightened sense of drama, as an example of how Barnet used "aural flourishes" in his storytelling. However, Nield also noted that the director, who had only made one sound film prior to By the Bluest of Seas, had not yet divorced himself from silent film techniques, such as the occasional use of intertitles and a reliance on facial expressions. Illustrating Barnet's skill as a visual storyteller, Nield pointed to the simplistic manner in which the opening scene is told, the "rocking, ill-angled" cinematography used to capture a storm, and the abstract conveyance of time through the instant abandonment of a crowded hall. Nield wrote that in Barnet's most creative moments, By the Bluest of Seas could be compared to Jean Vigo's 1934 masterpiece L'Atalante.

The National Film and Sound Archive of Australia agreed with Nield's assessment of Barnet's filmmaking style, writing that one of the director's prime accomplishments in By the Bluest of Seas "was to carry the pleasures of silent cinema into the sound age." The organization wrote that "Barnet is...always trying to return his cinema to a pure match between expressive image and a musical soundscape accompaniment, always emphasizing charming gesture, comic speed and music over spoken dialogue". Although Barnet's influence has been largely overlooked in the modern era, according to the National Film and Sound Archive, Charlie Chaplin's early sound films, such as Modern Times, actually drew inspiration from those of Barnet.

In the 2022 Sight and Sound critic's poll, By the Bluest of Seas received votes from 14 critics and was placed at 211th place, tied with films like Duck Soup, All About Eve, and The Deer Hunter.

== Home media ==
Subtitled releases of the film have been made available through Russian label Ruscico (in early 2012) and UK label Mr. Bongo Films (later that year). The Ruscico release contains two discs, the second of which contains text-based annotations filled with production and reception information, thematic analysis, and anecdotes from the cast and crew. Anthony Nield of Digital Fix reviewed this release, giving the video and audio presentation, as well as the quality of bonus features, seven out of ten stars. He wrote that there is damage present due to age, but that it is no greater than one might expect.
