= The Blue Express =

1929 film

- Directed by: Ilya Trauberg
- Written by: Leonid Iyerikhonov; Ilya Trauberg; Sergei Tretyakov
- Cinematography: Boris Khrennikov; Georges C. Stilly
- Music by: Edmund Meisel
- Production company: Sovkino
- Release date: 20 December 1929
- Running time: 62 minutes
- Country: Soviet Union
- Languages: Silent; Russian intertitles

The Blue Express or China Express (Russian: Голубой экспресс, romanized: Goluboy ekspress) is a 1929 Soviet silent drama film directed by Ilya Trauberg.

== Plot ==
The events of the film take place in China in the late 1920s. At the Nanjing train station, a train called the "Blue Express" is about to depart for Suzhou, with passengers from various social classes on board. The departure is delayed due to the tardiness of a British diplomat, whom a Chinese general is waiting for. After the train finally departs, soldiers begin attacking other passengers, a situation which is supported by the British diplomat. Passengers from the third class, consisting of workers and peasants, rise up and seize the train. The express races along the tracks, symbolizing revolution.

== Cast ==
- Sergei Minin as The European
- Igor Chernyak
- I. Arbenin
- Yakov Gudkin as An Overseer
- I. Savelyev as An Overseer
- San Bo Yan as The Girl
- Lian Din Do as The Merchant
- Chu Chai Wan as The Peasant
- Chzan Kai as The Fireman
- A. Vardul as The Coolie
- Spasayevsky
- Yanina Zhejmo
- Zana Zanoni
- Boris Brodyansky
- Chai Wan San as The General

== Bibliography ==
- Christie, Ian & Taylor, Richard. The Film Factory: Russian and Soviet Cinema in Documents 1896-1939. Routledge, 2012.
