= The Miracle Worker (1936 film) =

- Russian: Чудесница
- Directed by: Aleksandr Medvedkin
- Written by: Aleksandr Medvedkin
- Starring: Leonid Alekseev; Tatyana Barysheva; Zinaida Bokareva; Sergey Bulaevskiy; Yelena Ibragimova-Dobrzhanskaya
- Cinematography: Igor Gelein
- Music by: Lev Shvarts
- Release date: February 11, 1937; (Soviet Union)
- Running time: 78 minutes
- Country: Soviet Union
- Language: Russian

The Miracle Worker (Russian: Чудесница) is a 1936 Soviet comedy film directed by Aleksandr Medvedkin.

== Plot ==
The Miracle Worker (1936)

Collective farmers of the agricultural artel "White Sands" offer the witch Ulyana to take part in the divination over the cows. With the help of her, they hope to win the passing banner.

== Cast ==
- Leonid Alekseev as Matvey - collective farm chairman
- Tatyana Barysheva
- Zinaida Bokareva as Zina Lagutina
- Sergey Bulaevskiy as Ivan - shepherd
- Yelena Ibragimova-Dobrzhanskaya as Varvara
- Lev Ivanov as Fire chief (as L. Ivanov)
- Zinovy Sazhinas Savva - hairdresser
- M. Shlenskaya as Ulyana (as M. Shlenskaya)
- Ivan Shtraukh as Captain Nikolay Stepanovich
- V. Shtraus as Dentist
- V. Tolstova as Malyutka - milkmaid (as V. Smetana-Tolstova)
