= Chadraabalyn Lodoidamba =

Mongolian writer

Chadraabalyn Lodoidamba (Mongolian: Чадраабалын Лодойдамба; 1917–1970) was a Mongolian writer.

He was born in Govi-Altai Province in 1917. In 1954 he graduated from National University of Mongolia, the same year that his first story "Malgaitai Chono" (The Wolf in the Cap) was published.

His novel The Crystal Clear Tamir River, set during Mongolia's 1921 revolution, was made into a movie trilogy (1970–1973) by Ravjagiin Dorjpalam. The book has also been translated into Russian and (from Russian) into German.

== Works ==
- Tungalag Tamir (Тунгалаг Тамир, The Crystal Clear Tamir River) (1962)
- Manai surguuliinkhan (Манай сургуулийнхан, My School friends) (1952)
- Altaid (Алтайд, In the Altai)
