= Baljinnyamyn Amarsaikhan =

Mongolian actor and producer

- Born: October 17, 1977 (age 48); Ulan Bator, Mongolia
- Occupations: Actor, film producer
- Years active: 1987-present
- Spouse: Uran Sainbileg
- Children: 6

Baljinnyamyn Amarsaikhan (Mongolian: Балжиннямын Амарсайхан) is a Mongolian actor and producer, known for Thief of the Mind (2011) and Trapped Abroad (2014).

Thief of the Mind (or Mind Thief) produced by Amarsaikhan and directed by Janchivdorj Sengedorj won the Grand Prix for Best Film in 2011 during the Mongolian 2012 Academy Awards with Amarsaikhan also winning the award for "Best Lead Role - Actor" during the same event. The film also won Best Supporting Role, Best Cinematography, Best Screenplay and Best Sound Editing. Amarsaikhan was honored for his "valuable commitment in the development of the Mongolian film industry" at the event.

He currently appears in Marco Polo, a television drama series about Marco Polo's early years in the court of Kublai Khan; Amarsaikhan plays Ariq Böke. The show premiered on Netflix in December 2014. The series is produced by The Weinstein Company.

== Filmography ==
Acting

- 2011: Thief of the Mind (Бодлын хулгайч, Bodlyn khulgaich) as Gantulga
- 2012: Aravt
- 2014: Trapped Abroad as Garid
- 2014: Marco Polo (TV series)
- 2016: The Faith as Itgel
- 2019: The Mongolian Connection as Ganzorig (The Mongolian Connection at IMDb)
- 2022: Harvest Moon as Tulga

Production

- 2011: Thief of the Mind
- 2014: Trapped Abroad
- 2016: The Faith
- 2022: Harvest Moon
