= Seekers of Happiness =

- Directed by: Vladimir Korsch-Sablin; Iosif Shapiro
- Written by: G. Kobets; Iogann Zeltser
- Starring: Benjamin Zuskin; Maria Blumenthal-Tamarina
- Production company: Belgoskino
- Release date: 1936
- Running time: 84 minutes
- Country: Soviet Union
- Language: Russian

Seekers of Happiness (Russian: Искатели счастья, romanized: Iskateli schastya) is a 1936 Soviet film about Jewish settlers relocating to the Jewish Autonomous Oblast in the far east of the Soviet Union. It is also known by its alternative name, A Greater Promise.

== Plot ==
The film tells the story of a Jewish family relocating to the JAO (a.k.a. Birobidžan). "The plot lays out a successful solution to the 'Jewish Question' through two love stories and a crime" in the JAO. The love stories and crime provide a narrative basis to demonstrate how several obstacles are overcome:

1. The end to impoverishment of the Jewish population;
2. The transformation of Jews into farmers;
3. Shifting the social structure of the Jews by integrating them into a “productive work” environment;
4. Replacing formerly religious social with secular socialist institutions; and
5. The sublimation of religiously and culturally based contradictions between different nationalities by virtue of a secular socialist Russian and Jewish culture

Dvoira is the matriarch of a family that travels to Birobidžan in order to find a happy, economically and politically untroubled life. In the first sequence of the film we see the migrant family, consisting of Dvoira, her two daughters, Rosa and Basya, her son Lyova, and Basya's husband Pinya travelling to Birobidžan, first by ship and then by train. The point of origin is unclear, but the ship indicates that the family is coming from abroad. While some identify the United States as the family's origin, Alexander Senderovich in his Dissertation states that the family were “repatriates to Soviet Union from Palestine.” Arriving in the JAO, despite difficulties in the beginning, the whole family quickly adjusts to the new way of living at the collective farm “Red fields” – except for Pinya. While everyone else is excited to start working in the collective, Pinya only agreed to accompany the family after he read in a newspaper article that someone had found gold near the farm. Refusing to do hard physical work, he manages to be assigned to garden work, which gives him the opportunity to sneak away to a small river bank, where he searches for gold. Caught doing so by Lyovka, Pinya offers him half of the gold he found. But when Lyovka threatens to hand over the gold to the collective, Pinya hits Lyovka on the head with a shovel. Believing Lyovka to be dead, Pinya attempts to flee over the border to China, but gets caught and arrested.

After arriving at the collective, Rosa, the daughter, meets Korney a young fisherman's son, and they fall in love with each other. Dvoira is worried about their relationship, because Korney is “a Russian” and not a Jew. In a short conversation between mother and daughter, Rosa asks rhetorically: “I don't know who's better … The Russian Korney or the Jew Pinya?” Because Korney is found with Lyovka's body, the collective suspects him to be the murderer, and arrests him. Only when Lyovka somewhat miraculously awakes, and points to Pinya as the guilty, is Korney's name is cleared. The movie ends with the marriage celebration of Rosa and Korney and the last still showing Dvoira praising their bond and the government for providing Jews with a home country of their own: “Pour some wine and we'll drink to our motherland and to those who gave us such a good life!”

Basya, the second daughter has fallen in love with Natan, the chairman of the “Red Field” collective. But becoming a couple is not possible as Basya is married to Pinya. She is very unhappy in her marriage because Pinya has refused to assimilate. However, Pinya's arrest clears the path for the two, and, after Dvoira's blessing, they are shown dancing happily at Rosa's wedding celebration.

== Background ==
The JAO experiment arose from different tendencies and conflicts in the broader discourse on the so-called “Jewish question” in Russia of the early 20th century and shifts in the national policies of the post-revolutionary society. The puzzling question is why the Bolshevik soviet government that was originally committed to internationalism, at some point, agreed and actually pushed forward the establishment of a Jewish national project on the territory of the USSR.

The phenomena of the JAO stands both in the context of the Zionist idea of Jewish Statehood and the history of the Jews in the Soviet Union, hence under consideration of the changing governmental policies on the matter and on the question of national policies in general. Before the October Revolution there were three main positions on the Jewish side on the matter of the “Jewish question”. Two within Zionism, and one outside of it. The Zionist movement was split into those who aimed to establish a Jewish State on the territory of Palestine, and the territorialists for whom Palestine was only one of several options. A third position was held by the Bund (General Jewish Labor Bund of Lithuania, Poland and Russia) who promoted the idea of a national cultural autonomy in a multi-ethnic State. This notion of nationality was not bound to the existence of a national territory, but imagined an administrative unit for cultural issues independently from the place where someone lived. The Bund, in the pre-revolutionary time, pictured the future State as a federative System of culturally independent units without territorial binding.

In the beginning of the 20th century, before the October Revolution, a tense conflict between the Bund and the Iskra-group around Lenin broke out. The Bund called for the federal restructuring of the Russian Social Democratic Labor Party (RSDRP), and the recognition of Jews as a nation. Both claims where heavily rejected by the Iskra-group as being separatist and backward. For the Bolsheviks the Jewish people couldn't be a nation, because they lacked one fundamental component: an own territory. In 1913 Stalin, who later between 1917 and 1923 held the position of the Commissariat for Nationalities Affairs, published an article on the point of view on nationhood by the social democratic party, where he defined nationhood by virtue of a common language and territory. In fact, in the context of Lenin's two phase model with the goal of merging all nations into one socialist world society, the Jews already held an advanced position. The general answer to the “Jewish question” by Marxists, including the Menshiviks, was assimilation.

However, the post-revolutionary situation required a conceptual shift. At the end of the 19th century 74% of the Jewish population, due to restrictions in the tsarist times, “made livings from petty commerce, retail sales, small-scale handicraft production, and unskilled labor”, while only 3.5% worked in agriculture. The social structure of the Jewish population basically reversed the overall proportions of the agricultural society they were living in. Already the slowly starting industrialization had caused much unemployment among Jewish merchants and crafts. After the Bolsheviks took power in October 1917 their original belief in a self-completing assimilation process, was confronted with the actual mass poverty of the Russian Jews. World War I caused pogroms during the Civil War (1918-1920), and finally the Soviet centralization of production of even small industrial businesses and the prohibition of private property had catastrophic consequences for the Jews, due to their particular social structure, and most lived in despair.

The implementation of the NEP (New Economic Policy) in 1921, which brought back a low form of capitalist production, mitigated the situation partly. But many Jews fell under the category of lišency. Lišency means: “those who are deprived of rights” and was used as a political instrument to fight bourgeois elements. It was generally applied to all who were considered to have worked in sections that fell under the category of “unproductive labor”. Hence, while the Bolshevik policy granted equal rights for Jews as Jews, their particular social structure effectively deprived about one third of them of these rights all over again. The Soviet government was conscious of this dilemma. In order to solve this problem two institutions were founded, KOMZET and OZET, and provided with the task of a “productivation” of the Jewish population, by finding a territory were Jews could be relocated and transformed into farmers, as agriculture was considered “productive work”. In contrast to the pre-revolutionary position Russian Jews were now handled in the same way as the multiple other nations living on the former tsarist territory. “National in form and socialist in content”, was Stalin's well known formula. The goal now was to establish a secular Yiddish counter-culture against a religiously or Zionist self-understanding. Most other nations, though, had their territory within or outside the USSR. In contrast to, e.g., Germans or Polish living on Russian soil, Jews were exceptional in the sense that they were an extra-territory nation without even a territory elsewhere.

After a first attempt to relocate the Jewish population in the Crimea had failed due to the resistance of the local authorities and antisemitic biases and even attacks by the peasantry, the decision fell on a region in the far east with a border to China – Birobidžan. In 1928, the Soviets designated the region around the rivers Bira and Bidžan for the Jewish Autonomous Oblast (JAO). In 1934 the area was officially declared to be the JAO. The relocation project, however, already began in 1928. For this, propaganda was produced on a large scale. From literature to radio broadcasts over poems, songs and a stage play, even an airplane was named “Birobidzhanets”. Also, the free train ride, and a welcome payment were extra motivations. However, the organization was disastrous. The provided shelters were quickly overcrowded, and in combination with the rough climate, heavy rainfalls in spring, hot and humid summers, and very cold winters, hunger and disease were the result. Many arrivals who could afford it, left after a very short time, leaving only the poorest behind.

Between 1936 and 1938, beginning in the same year in which “Seekers of Happiness” was released, purges in all national republics and provinces took place, wiping out the local party leaderships and administrative elites. With them the national policy shifted from a cultural integrative federal system to Russification and centralism. The murder of the JAO elites was being justified by reproaching them of secret Zionist and Trotskyst ideology and espionage. 1938 even KOMZET and OZET fell prey to the Great Purge. In effect the purge led to the destruction of the soviet Yiddish culture that had slowly developed in the short time the JAO had already existed. Only after World War II and under the impression of the shoa, a Yiddish culture on Soviet soil was shortly in bloom again. This time, however, not initiated by the government, but solely due to higher migration.

== Motifs: Dreams, work, and happiness ==
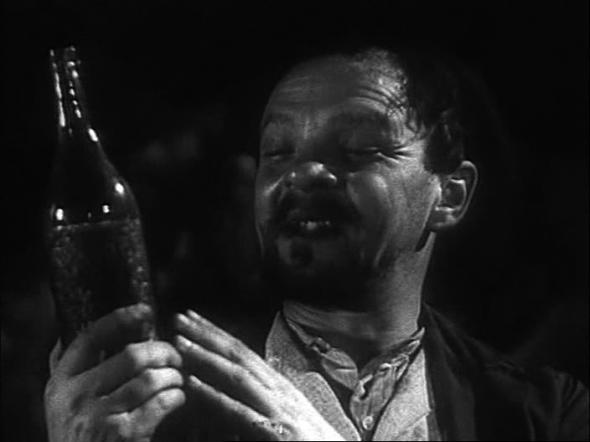
Pinya with his bottle of gold dust

In the scene where Lyovka catches Pinya searching for gold, the latter envisions himself as the owner of a suspender factory. This vision is ironically contrasted by the fact that Pinya constantly has to pull up his falling pants throughout the movie. Pinya's dream is individualist and based on the idea of private property. This becomes clear both in his dream to become a factory owner and in his defense later that the gold belongs to him, because he has extracted it himself. But the latter also contradicts Pinya's general characterization as lazy. It is clearly Pinya's future vision of himself that activates his willingness of physical work. But the seed capital that the gold is supposed to become, is neither the product of exploitation nor of any kind of violent dispossession as described in Marx' chapter on the “so called primitive accumulation”. Accordingly, Pinya is not persecuted for the possession of gold, but for attempted murder. Pinya's gold obsession is rather condemned morally, as it is causing Pinya's disposition to commit a murder. The notion of work that produces private property is delegitimized by presenting it as morally corruptible. Although, after he is captured, Pinya receives many deprecating stares, the gold functions solely as the motif in the criminal case. But his capitalist dream not only activates his willingness to do physical work, it also provides him with a brief moment of happiness, namely when he first believes to have found gold. The suggestively appealing contrast between the movie's title on the one and Pinya's role on the other side – the first called “Seekers of Happiness” and the latter “seeking for gold” - proves to be reductive. The movie rather depicts happiness as the successful actualization of a dream by means of work. This becomes very clear, when one looks at the representation of happiness in the rest of the movie. Almost all of the scenes, apart from those who show people at work, are such, in which a problem is addressed, while every time the movie shows people going to, coming from, or being at work, they are depicted as happy – smiling, laughing, whistling. The only exceptions to this are love scenes between Rosa and Korney and their marriage at the very end of the movie. In a suggestive montage Pinya's gold-seeking is juxtaposed with the harvest of the collective, which is depicted as productive by the shear mass of “golden wheat”, as the first line of the Russian extra-diegetic song that underlies the pictures comments. When, earlier in the movie, Pinya asks a worker, what one needs in order to find gold, he answers: “Luck.” Hence the montage contrasts two notions or modes of work in their relation to happiness. While Pinya's brief experience of happiness is shown to be dependent on luck and holds only for the moment in which he finds what he's looking for, the work of the collective is shown to be substantially correlated with happiness, as the collectively organized process is in its productivity identical with the actualization of the socialist dream. The relation of the two modes of production and their relation to happiness are put in contrast as individual vs collective, based on luck vs self-sustainable, and unproductive vs productive.

== Jewish Elements in the Movie ==
=== The wandering Jew and Luftmensch ===
The topos of the wandering Jew is used several times throughout the movie. In the opening scene of the film a non-diegetic Yiddish song about the “interminable Jewish wanderings” is heard and complemented by Pinya's muttering: “Here we are traveling, and traveling / Maybe we'll never get there....” Senderovich concludes: “The family's journey is supposedly intended to put an end both to the eternal Jewish displacement and to unproductive Jewish existence represented by Pinya.” The motif of the wandering Jew and his characterization as a lutftmensch (“man of air”) who works with his head instead of his hands are merged in Pinya's figure. But both are not represented as natural features, but as a particular habitus based on the socio-economical living conditions of Jews before the revolution. As Pinya says at the end of the movie: “We never had enough bread. Gold is money, and money is everything. I don't understand anything.” Pinya's whole character, from his optical appearance, as a capitalist with bowler hat and pocket watch, over his gestures that always signify weighing up different options, to his greedy and restless character, he is featured with Semitic stereotypes. Hence the movie doesn't falsify these stereotypes, but contextualizes their allegedly actual existence through their relation to social conditions. This makes Pinya rather into a tragic than into a malicious figure.

=== Language ===
All the characters in the film speak Russian. Several songs, however, are sung in Yiddish. At the train station, where the family arrives, a Hebrew lettering on the wall reads in Yiddish: “Soll leben die Lenin-Stalin'sche Nation” (“Viva The Leninist-Stalinist nation!”). In addition several people are shown reading a Yiddish newspaper (probably the “Shtern”), and at an information booth Yiddish brochures are lying out, being titled e.g. “Lenin”. Jewish nationality is Yiddish language with soviet content.

=== Religious institutions ===
Dvoira, the mother, represents the character that holds on to religious institutions. When she worries about Rosa's involvement with Korney and is in need of advice, she doesn't know to whom she should turn. “In the shtel” she “sought advice from the Rabbi”, as she mentions towards Natan, the chairman of the collective, who then offers his advice. The social function of the Rabbi is substituted by a representative of the party, who, as Dvoira concludes, is “even better”. Nonetheless, Dvoira remains skeptical towards the inter-religious or inter-ethnic relationship. Her turning point cannot be marked decisively, but might be triggered by the fact, that “the Jew Pinya” attempted to murder her son. Like the original suspicion against Korney in the murder case proves to be unfounded, so does Dvoiras reluctance in the love case, resulting in the secular marriage at the end of the film.

Jewish mourning traditionally involves sitting next to the mourners for several days, while friends and family come by to offer support to the mourning – this institution is called Shiva. Although Lyovka turns out not to be dead at the end, the viewers are made believe that he is, and are shown a mourning scene in which Dvoira kneels next to Lyovka's bed crying. Surprisingly the film offers no substitute for the collective Jewish mourning institution. Rosa who tries to support the desperate mother is even called away to work, leaving her mother alone with her grief. In addition, over the bed in which Loyvka lays, hangs the picture of a Rabbi. But in the following scene in Natan's bureau this picture is replaced by one of Stalin. The conversation between Rosa and Natan already suggests that Natan believes Korney to be innocent and suspects Pinya of the crime. The replacement of the picture is paralleled with the replacement of the murder suspects, and as Natan has already occupied the advisory function of the shtetl Rabbi, Korney's acquittal also places him symbolically at the position of an acceptable husband for Rosa, despite his non-Jewish heritage. In particular, because the rhetorical question posed by Rosa: “I don't know who's better … The Russian Korney or the Jew Pinya?”, finds a definite answer here. The wedding at the end of the movie is accordingly a secular wedding. However both Yiddish and Russian music is sung and played.

== Between the Stills ==
Despite the relatively straightforward propagandistic message the film might also contain elements of counter-narratives. Senderovich suggests such a reading in the train sequence at the beginning of the film: “a peculiar figure appears: a man playing a mournful tune on his clarinet. He identifies the tune as 'Israel's Lament on the banks of the Amur River' … The title of the tune calls to mind the words of Psalm 137, about the exile of the people of Israel in 587 BCE to ancient Babylon: 'By the rivers of Babylon, there we sat down and wept, when we remembered Zion.' By transposing the toponym of ' the rivers of Babylon' onto the 'banks of the Amur River', the river that forms the border between the Jewish Autonomous Region and China, the song turns Birobidzhan not into a Soviet Zion but into Babylon.”

A second possible inscribed double coding can be found at the train station after the family arrives in Birobidžan. The Yiddish phrase in Hebrew lettering placed dominantly on the arch of the room refers to the discourse on Jewish nationhood: “Soll leben die die Lenin-Stalin'sche Nation” (“Shall live the Lenin-Stalinist nation”). Shortly after this shot we are shown a conversation between Pinya and Basya discussing the “Red Field” collective as a possible destination of their journey. Behind the two a poster is hanging with a Yiddish text whose entire content cannot be reconstructed. However, one word can be read clearly in several stills depicting Basya: “Bund” (“בונד") The word calls to mind an alternative solution to the “Jewish problem” by referring to the Bund (General Jewish Labor Bund of Lithuania, Poland and Russia) and its idea of a non-territorial cultural Jewish autonomy in a federally structured Soviet State.

A third counter-narrative might be seen in the above-mentioned replacement of the Rabbi's picture with one of Stalin. Seekers of happiness was released in 1936 shortly before the beginning of the Great Purge in which the entire political elite of the JAO was decimated. However, purges where already happening in the beginning of 1936 on a smaller scale. The Rabbi in the frame hanging over the bed is presumably Rabbi Israel Meir HaCohen Kagan a.k.a. the “Chofetz Chaim”, a famous Polish Rabbi of the 19th century. “Chofetz Chaim” translates “Seeker of live”. In his main work “Sefer Chofetz Chaim” he deals with the problem of “Lashon Hara”, the term for derogatory speech about another person which is severely forbidden in Jewish law, even then when what is said is true. The subject matter of Lashon Hara has several reference points in the plot of the film. Firstly, of course, the constant complains about Pinya's attitude. Secondly, the mourning scene stands in the context of the falsely accused Korney. The fact that the Rabbi's picture is hanging over the bed is confusing in as much as Dvoira had already accepted Natan as an advisor substituting for the advisory function of the Rabbi in the shtetl earlier in the movie. The persistence of the Rabbi's presence might signify Dvoira's not yet completely overcome religious belief. But it might as well, for those educated in Jewish tradition, comment on the atmosphere of denunciation in the Stalinist era. The replacement of the Rabbi's picture by one of Stalin might then not signify solely a process of secularization based on functional substitution, but puts Natan as the one structurally holding the Rabbi's place in contrast to Stalin. The film can then be read as aesthetically foreshadowing the purge of the Jewish elite which Natan stands for. In all three examples the understanding of the suggested counter-narratives is based on the condition that the viewer is educated in Jewish religion or culture: biblical knowledge in the first, Hebrew reading literacy in the second, and knowledge of Jewish law in the third. The film undermines censorship by unfolding the critical message by means of esoteric signs only readable for the Jewish audience.

== Bibliography ==
- Kuchenbecker, Antje "Zionismus ohne Zion. Birobidžan: Idee und Geschichte eines jüdischen Staates in Sowjet-Fernost" Metropol Publishing Company, Berlin 2000 ISBN 3932482204
- Weinberg, Robert "Stalin's Forgotten Zion: Birobidzhan and the Making of a Soviet Jewish Homeland: an Illustrated History, 1928-1996" University of California Press, Berkeley 1998 ISBN 0520209907
- Senderovich, Alexander "The Red Promised Land: Narratives of Jewish Mobility in Early Soviet Culture" ProQuest Dissertations and Theses 2010
- Draskoczy, Julie. "Seekers of Happiness". White Russian, Black Russian: Race and Ethnicity in Russian Cinema. University of Pittsburgh.
- "Biography of Chofetz Chaim". Torah.Org. 8 August 2015.
