= Dagvyn Luvsansharav =

Mongolian composer

- Born: June 1, 1927; Khentii Aimag, Mongolia
- Died: May 25, 2014 (aged 86); Mongolia
- Other names: Лувсаншарав Дагвын
- Occupation: Composer
- Known for: Maamuu Naash Ir

Dagvyn Luvsansharav (Mongolian: Дагвын Лувсаншарав; 1927-2014) is a Mongolian composer. Described as having a "rich repertoire of Mongolian songs which have a special place", he is perhaps best known for his Sükhbaataryn Magtuu (Praise of Sükhbaatar) or his ballet Legend of the Sun. His music featured in the 1994 Mongolian film Toorog, directed by Yondonbaliin Tserendolgor. Luvsansharav became an Honoured Artist of the Republic in the early sixties.
