= Aleksandr Medvedkin =

Soviet film director (1900–1989)

- Александр Медведкин
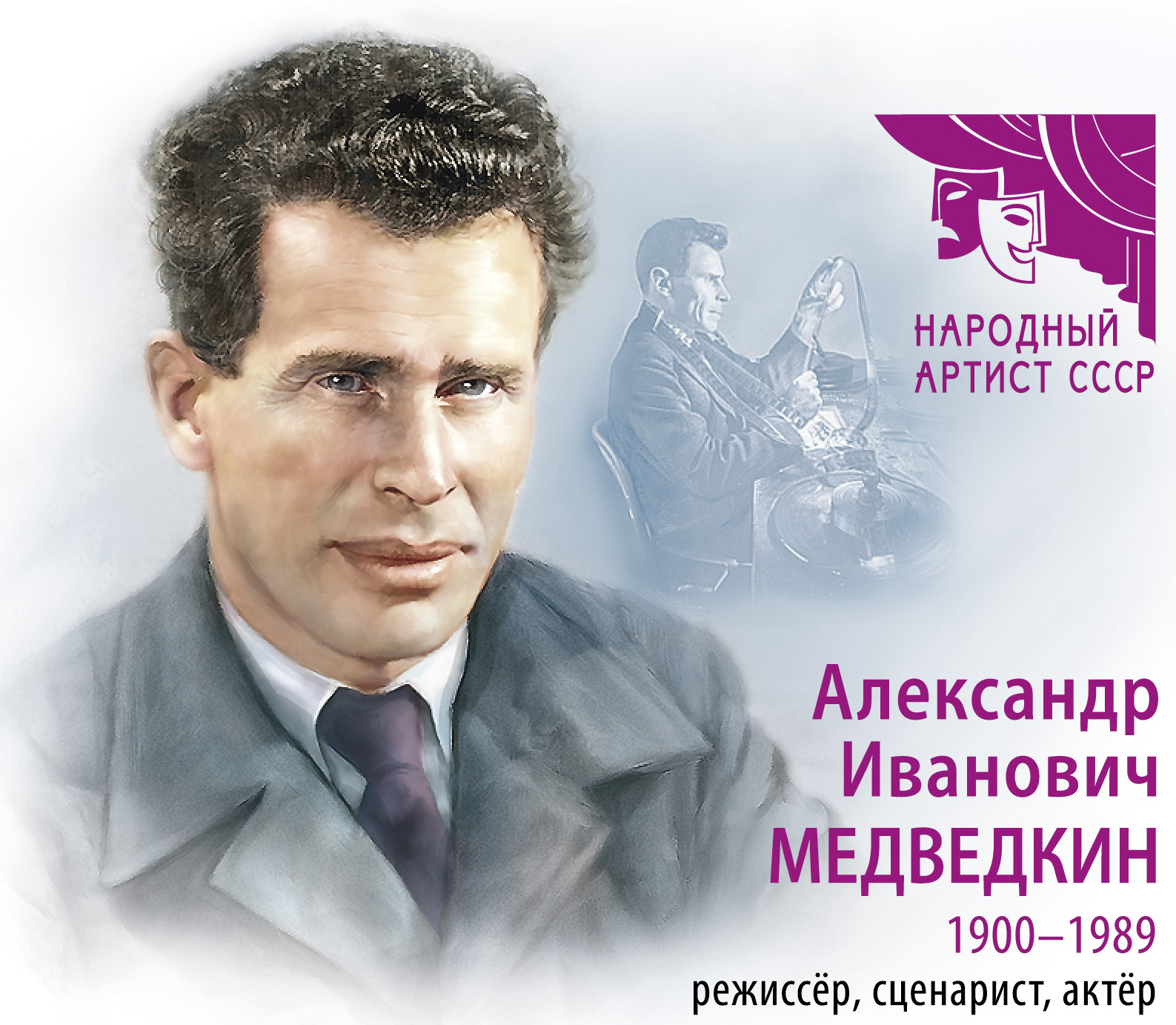
- 2025 stamp of Russia
- Born: Aleksandr Ivanovitch Medvedkin; 24 February 1900; Penza, Penza Governorate, Russian Empire
- Died: 20 February 1989 (aged 88); Moscow, Soviet Union
- Years active: 1929–1956
- Spouse: Vera Ivanovna Medvedkina
- Awards: USSR State Prize (1974)

Aleksandr Ivanovich Medvedkin (Russian: Александр Иванович Медведкин; 24 February 1900 – 20 February 1989) was a Soviet Russian film director, best known for his 1935 film Happiness. His life and art are the subject of Chris Marker's documentary films The Train Rolls On (1971) and The Last Bolshevik (1992).

He travelled around the USSR in his Kinopoezd, a Cinetrain, in which he carried film equipment and shot movies in Kolkhozy, which he would then screen there.

== Selected filmography ==
- Happiness (1935)
- The Miracle Worker (1936)
- The New Moscow (1938)
- Blossoming Youth (1939)
- The Liberated Earth (1946)
