= Agvaantserengiin Enkhtaivan =

Mongolian music composer and film maker

Agvaantserengiin Enkhtaivan (Mongolian: Агваанцэрэнгийн Энхтайван; born 1958) is a Mongolian music composer and film maker who studied in Russia. He is the director of the film A Pearl in the Forest.

In 1990, he became famous in Mongolia by being selected to play the lead role of Temüjin (Genghis Khan) in the Mongolian film, Under The Eternal Blue Sky, directed by Baljinnyam.

== Awards ==
- Meritorious Artist (УГЗ)
- People's Artist of Mongolia

== Filmography ==
- 2003 Khan Khentii Mountain (documentary)
- 2004 The Children of Genghis Khan (documentary)
- 2008 A Pearl in the Forest (film)
- 2012 The Sky Son (film)

== Discography ==
- Melodies of Mongolia, volume 1
- Melodies of Mongolia, volume 2
- Melodies of Mongolia, volume 3
- Melodies of Mongolia, volume 4
- Original soundtrack for the feature film "A Pearl in the Forest (Moilkhon)"
