= Son of Mongolia =

- Directed by: Ilya Trauberg
- Written by: Boris Lapin; Lev Slavin; Zakhar Khatsrevin
- Starring: Tseveen (Shoroot) Chimid; Ichin-Khorlo; Susor-Barma
- Cinematography: Moisei Kaplan
- Music by: Nikolay Rabinovich
- Production company: Lenfilm Studio
- Release date: 20 November 1936
- Country: Soviet Union
- Languages: Russian; Mongolian

Son of Mongolia (Russian: Syn Mongolii) is a 1936 Soviet drama film directed by Ilya Trauberg and starring Tse-Ven Rabdan, Igin-Khorlo and Susor-Barma. The film's sets were designed by art director Igor Vuskovich. The film was banned in the Soviet Union in 1941.

== Plot ==
A political fantasy about a shepherd's struggle against local feudal lords. The simple shepherd seeks the love of a girl named Dulma and sets off in search of a magical garden, the fruits of which, according to legend, will make him a hero. Unbeknownst to him, he falls into a trap set by rivals who also seek Dulma's hand. They deceive him into traveling to Inner Mongolia, where he is captured by the Japanese. Determined to be heroic, he does everything in his power to thwart the enemy's plot to invade Mongolia.

== Cast ==
- Tse-Ven Rabdan
- Igin-Khorlo as Dulma
- Susor-Barma as Chauffeur
- Bato-Ochir as The Prince
- Gam-Bo as Innkeeper
- Ir-Kan as Prince's Foreign Advisor
- Zigmit as The Monk

== Bibliography ==
- Amy Sargeant. Storm Over Asia: Kinofile Filmmakers' Companion 11. I. B. Tauris, 2007.
