= Ilya Trauberg =

Ilya Trauberg (Ilya Zakharovich Trauberg) was a Russian director born in Odessa on December 13, 1905, who died in Berlin on December 8, 1948.

== Filmography ==
=== Assistant director ===
- 1927 - October: Ten Days That Shook the World

=== Director ===
- 1927 : Léningrad aujourd'hui - Documentaire
- 1929 : The Blue Express ou Le Train mongol (Goluboy ekspress)
- 1932 : Nous travaillons pour vous (Dlya vas naydyotsya rabota)
- 1934 : Chastnyy sluchay
- 1936 : Son of Mongolia (Mongol Khüü ou Syn Mongolii)
- 1938 : God devyatnadtsatyy
- 1941 : My zhdem vas s pobedoy
- 1941 : Kontsert-vals
- 1942 : Boyevoy kinosbornik 11

=== Screenwriter ===
- 1929 : The Blue Express ou Le Train mongol (Goluboy ekspress)
- 1932 : Nous travaillons pour vous (Dlya vas naydyotsya rabota)
- 1934 : Chastnyy sluchay
- 1938 : God devyatnadtsatyy
- 1941 : Kontsert-vals
