= List of Mongolian submissions for the Academy Award for Best International Feature Film =

Best International Feature Film submissions from Mongolia

Highlights
- Debut: 2003
- Submissions: 11
- Nominations: none
- Oscar winners: none

Mongolia has submitted films for the Academy Award for Best International Feature Film (Note: The category was previously named the Academy Award for Best Foreign Language Film, but this was changed to the Academy Award for Best International Feature Film in April 2019, after the Academy deemed the word "Foreign" to be outdated.) since 2003. The award is handed out annually by the United States Academy of Motion Picture Arts and Sciences to a feature-length motion picture produced outside the United States that contains primarily non-English dialogue.

As of 2026, Mongolia has submitted eleven films for consideration, but none of them were nominated.

== Submissions ==
Every year, each country is invited by the Academy of Motion Picture Arts and Sciences to submit its best film for the Academy Award for Best International Feature Film. The International Feature Film Committee oversees the process and reviews all the submitted films. Following this, they vote via secret ballot to determine the five nominees for the award.

The Story of the Weeping Camel (2003) was the first Mongolian production to be nominated for an Academy Award, at the Academy Award for Best Documentary Feature Film category in 2004.

The first two Mongolian submissions concerned the lives of rural families on the Mongolian steppe, and the closely intertwined life of people and their animals. Both films contained elements of documentary and fiction and used real Mongolian families as their actors. In Weeping Camel, a family attempts to reconcile a mother camel who refuses to nurse its newborn calf, with a traditional musical ritual. In Yellow Dog, a little girl tries to convince her reluctant family to adopt a wild dog.

All the films submitted are primary in Mongolian. Below is a list of the films that have been submitted by Mongolia for review by the Academy for the award.

Year (Ceremony)	Film title used in nomination	Mongolian title	Director	Result
2003 (76th)	The Story of the Weeping Camel	Ингэний Нулимс	Byambasuren Davaa and Luigi Falorni	Not nominated
2005 (78th)	The Cave of the Yellow Dog	Шар Нохойн Там	Byambasuren Davaa	Not nominated
2009 (82nd)	By the Will of Genghis Khan	Тайна Чингис Хаана	Andrei Borissov	Disqualified
2017 (90th)	The Children of Genghis	Чингисийн хүүхдүүд	Zolbayar Dorj	Not nominated
2019 (92nd)	The Steed	Хийморь	Erdenebileg Ganbold	Not nominated
2020 (92nd)	Veins of the World	Дэлхийн судлууд	Byambasuren Davaa	Not nominated
2022 (95th)	Harvest Moon	Эргэж ирэхгүй намар	Amarsaikhan Baljinnyam	Not nominated
2023 (96th)	City of Wind	Сэр сэр салхи	Lkhagvadulam Purev-Ochir	Not nominated
2024 (97th)	If Only I Could Hibernate	Баавгай болохсон	Zoljargal Purevdash	Not nominated
2025 (98th)	Silent City Driver	Чимээгүй хотын жолооч	Janchivdorj Sengedorj	Not nominated
2026 (99th)	Independence: Keeper of the Prophecy	Тусгаар тогтнол: Бошиг сахигч	B. Tamir	Pending

== See also ==
- List of Academy Award winners and nominees for Best International Feature Film
- List of Academy Award-winning foreign language films
- Cinema of Mongolia
