= Cineuropa =

European portal dedicated to cinema and audiovisual

- Website type: News and database
- Available in: English; French; Italian; Spanish
- Founded: 2002
- Headquarters: Brussels, Belgium
- Editor: Domenico La Porta
- Website: cineuropa.org

Cineuropa is an online information portal dedicated to the promotion of European cinema. It publishes daily news, reviews, interviews, and industry reports and maintains a database of information. It is available in four languages: English, French, Italian and Spanish. It is co-funded by the Creative Europe MEDIA Programme of the European Union. El País described Cineuropa as "an online media outlet that is very popular in the industry."

== History ==
Cineuropa was founded in 2002 as an online cinema information portal on the initiative of Italia Cinema, an agency of Italy's Ministry of Culture created for the promotion of Italian films abroad.

Cineuropa is co-funded by the Creative Europe MEDIA Programme of the European Union. Other financial partners include MiC Ministero della Cultura - Direzione generale per il cinema e l'audiovisivo, Centre du Cinéma et de l'Audiovisuel de la Fédération Wallonie-Bruxelles, CNC – Centre national du cinéma et de l'image animée, Swiss Films, LUX Audience Award of the European Parliament, Eurimages, Kosovo Cinematography Centre, Slovak Film Institute, ICAA - Instituto de la Cinematografía y de las Artes Audiovisuales, Luxembourg Film Fund, German Films, Slovenian Film Center, Lithuanian Film Centre, National Film Center Latvia, Estonian Film Institute, Georgian National Film Center.

== Content ==
Updated on a daily basis, the site's content aims to enhance the productions of the European film industry and international co-productions. Cineuropa regularly publishes news, reviews, special reports, interviews, focuses on the state of cinema in individual European countries, behind-the-scenes production information and updates from the world of festivals, national and international institutions, forums and markets. Its services include an online screenwriting course and script editing assistance. The site also maintains a large database of information about feature films produced and co-produced in Europe from 2000 to the present. As of April 2025, more than 30 thousand film profiles were available. Additional databases provide information about production companies, distributors, international sales agents funding bodies as well as directors, screenwriters, producers. In 2007, Andrew Bailey described Cineuropa as an "indispensable resource for production company contact information and breaking European film news."

The site has a readership that includes both audiovisual industry professionals and general viewers. Owing to recent website changes and a focus on new technologies and social media, Cineuropa has significantly expanded its audience, reaching around 600,000 monthly visits and over 65,000 newsletter subscribers in 2017.

== Collaborations and partnerships ==
Over the years, Cineuropa has created collaborations with festivals, cultural institutions, commissions and educational initiatives. For example, it has collaborated with the festivals and film markets of Berlin, Cannes, Karlovy Vary, Venice and San Sebastián. Since 2019, Cineuropa has collaborated with the Goethe-Institut and Institut Français to manage a project funded by the European Commission to assist European Union delegations in organizing film festivals.

Cineuropa regularly collaborates with think-tanks involved in the cultural and creative industries and their impact on the economy.

=== Cineuropa Award ===
Since 2009, Cineuropa has conferred the Cineuropa Award, which is conferred at partner festivals to quality films that deal with the themes of "European dialogue and integration." A film must be produced or co-produced by a country participating in the MEDIA Programme or member of Eurimages to be eligible. Winners of the award receive promotion on the Cineuropa site, including a special newsletter dedicated to the film (including a review, an interview with the director, and trailers and excerpts). As of 2023, the award is given at the following festivals:

- Trieste Film Festival
- Mons International Love Film Festival
- Vilnius Film Festival - Kino Pavasaris
- Lecce European Film Festival
- Cinema City International Film Festival
- Sarajevo Film Festival
- Istanbul Film Festival
- Brussels Mediterranean Film Festival
- Les Arcs Film Festival

Past winners of the award include, among others, Une vie meilleure (dir. Cédric Kahn, Lisbon & Estoril Film Festival, 2011), Horses of God (dir. Nabil Ayouch, Brussels Mediterranean Film Festival, 2012), Age of Uprising: The Legend of Michael Kohlhaas (dir. Arnaud des Pallières, Brussels Film Festival, 2012), Bang Gang (A Modern Love Story) (dir. Eva Husson, Les Arcs Film Festival, 2015), Lady Macbeth (dir. William Oldroyd, Les Arcs Film Festival, 2016), Explanation for Everything (dir. Gábor Reisz, Les Arcs Film Festival, 2023), and If Only I Could Hibernate (dir. Zoljargal Purevdash, Mons International Love Film Festival, 2024).
