= Orane Burri =

Swiss filmmaker

Orane Burri is a Swiss author, film director.screenwriter, and producer.

== Early life and education ==
Orane Burri left Switzerland at 18 to study at the Institut International de l'image et du Son, 3IS in Paris. There, she directed documentaries, fictions and TV commercials ( mostly for Nintendo) for 12 years . Because of ethical reasons, she then decided to quit commercials moved back to Neuchatel in Switzerland in 2012, where she's still working now.

== Career ==
Orane Burri directs engaged documentaries and short fiction films. Her films have been selected and awarded at numerous festivals, such as Visions du Réel, International Film Festival and Forum on Human Rights, Solothurn Film Days, Input She created Les Regardiens in 2016 to produce engaged audio-visual and documentary projects.

Her first feature Tabou about suicide, was released in Festivals and on primetime on the RTS in 2009. She the directed Armes Fatales, about weapons in Switzerland. Her film Le Prix du Gaz – Une Resistance Citoyenne was released in Swiss Cinemas in 2021 delayed by the Covid pandemic. She filmed in 2013 and 2014 the starting and winning resistance of her swiss region's people against a british shale gas company that wanted to frack in the drinking water of 120'00 people.

Just after the Covid, complotism on social medias and the Capitole's assault, inspired her for her first theater play La Démocratie en Procès-1989. Chosen as the official play for the 175 years of the Revolution Jubilee.

Then she has been invited by the botanical Garden of Neuchâtel to direct a film on economy and plants. This will be Inestimables Forêts (Priceless Forests). Released in swiss cinemas in 2024, it was selected in numerous internationals festivals and won 4 awards.

In 2025 she directed SIS, a 30min length fiction about bipolar desorder, produced by Luna Films.

In 2026 she wrote La Démocratie en procès-1989 and created the concept of label le succès with the actor Raphaël Tschudi.

She also teaches Cinema, audiovisual, transmedia through workshops in deferents schools like Eracom (Ecole romande d'art et de communication) HEIG-VD (Haute École d'Ingénierie et de Gestion du Canton de Vaud), EAA since 2015.

== Filmography ==
- 2005 Penaber- Exile. short documentary film
- 2009: Tabou, feature documentary - Swiss nominated film for Input
- 2015: Nettoyeurs de guerrefeature documentary
- 2017: Dublin, short fiction – Prix du Jury et Prix du Public au Festival Courgemétrage
- 2021: Le Prix du Gaz – Une Resistance Citoyenne (The Price of Gas – A Citizen Resistance)feature documentary
- 2024: Inestimables Forêts (Priceless Forests) feature documentary
- 2025: SIS (fiction) 30min fiction film
