= Munich International Documentary Film Festival =

Annual documentary film festival in Munich, Germany

Munich International Documentary Film Festival (DOK.fest München)
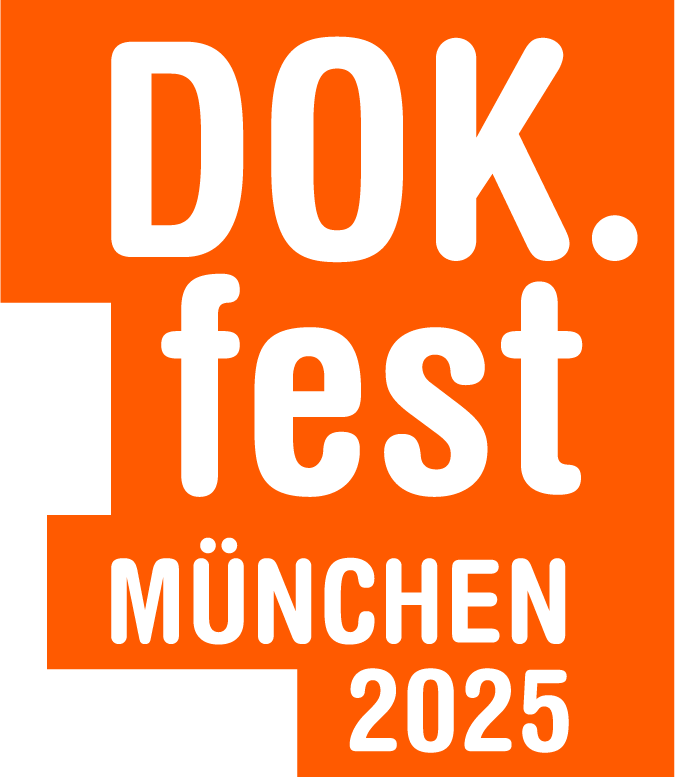
- DOK.fest Munich
- Location: Munich, Germany
- Founded: 1985; 41 years ago
- Most recent: 2025
- Hosted by: Internationales Dokumentarfilmfestival München
- Website: www.dokfest-muenchen.de

The Munich International Documentary Film Festival (DOK.fest München) was founded in 1985 and takes place annually in May in Munich, Germany. Since 2001 it has been organized by the non-profit association Internationales Dokumentarfilmfestival München in cooperation with the Filmstadt München. The festival focusses on documentary films that deal with socially relevant topics and are of artistic value. The 40th DOK.fest has held from May 12-25, 2025.

The business manager and artistic director of the 40th DOK.fest was Daniel Sponsel and deputy director was Adele Kohout. On February 12, 2025, it was announced that Sponsel is set to become president of the Hochschule für Fernsehen und Film München (HFF) in October 2025. At that time, Adele Kohout, will become the new festival director and her deputy will be Maya Reichert, who has been director of the festival's educational programm DOK.education.

The DOK.fest München is one of the largest documentary film festivals in Europe. In 2020 it was the first festival in Germany to take place exclusively online due to the COVID-19 pandemic. Again in 2021 the festival went virtual, with 131 films from 43 countries being watched by over 71,000 viewers. The 37th DOK.fest München in 2022 was the first to be held as a dual-track event. This dual format is still in use as of 2025, with online access to selected films continuing for one week after the public screenings in Munich venues.

== History ==
The DOK.fest München was established at the initiative of the Bavarian section of the German film industry association and lobby organisation "Arbeitsgemeinschaft Dokumentarfilm (AG DOK)" with the goal of making documentary films more popular and accessible to a broader audience. In cooperation with the association ''Filmstadt München'', a consortium of local film-related groups and with support from the city of Munich, the first festival was held in 1985 under the leadership of Gudrun Geyer, who directed the festival until 2001.

Following the departure of Gudrun Geyer, Hermann Barth took over the festival on behalf of the newly founded non-profit association "Internationales Dokumentarfilmfestival München e.V." with the express goal of raising the festival's profile within Germany and around the world. Since 2002 the festival has adopted "DOK.fest" as its brand name and expanded the number of sections on the annual program.

In 2009 Daniel Sponsel became the new director, working together with the business manager Christian Pfeil. He added such sections as DOK.deutsch; a guest series; a retrospective section; and an educational series named DOK.education. Since 2011 the platform DOK.forum has served to promote the film branch and encourage the participation of young filmmakers.

In 2020, due to the COVID-19 pandemic an online platform for screening was established under the name DOK.fest München @home. In addition to online film screenings, the platform offered live online discussions with filmmakers.

A special platform with restricted access for members of the film industry offers online workshops, pitchings and discussion panels. An educational program for school classes is made available on the platform DOK.education with links and teaching materials designed for three different age groups.

== Awards ==
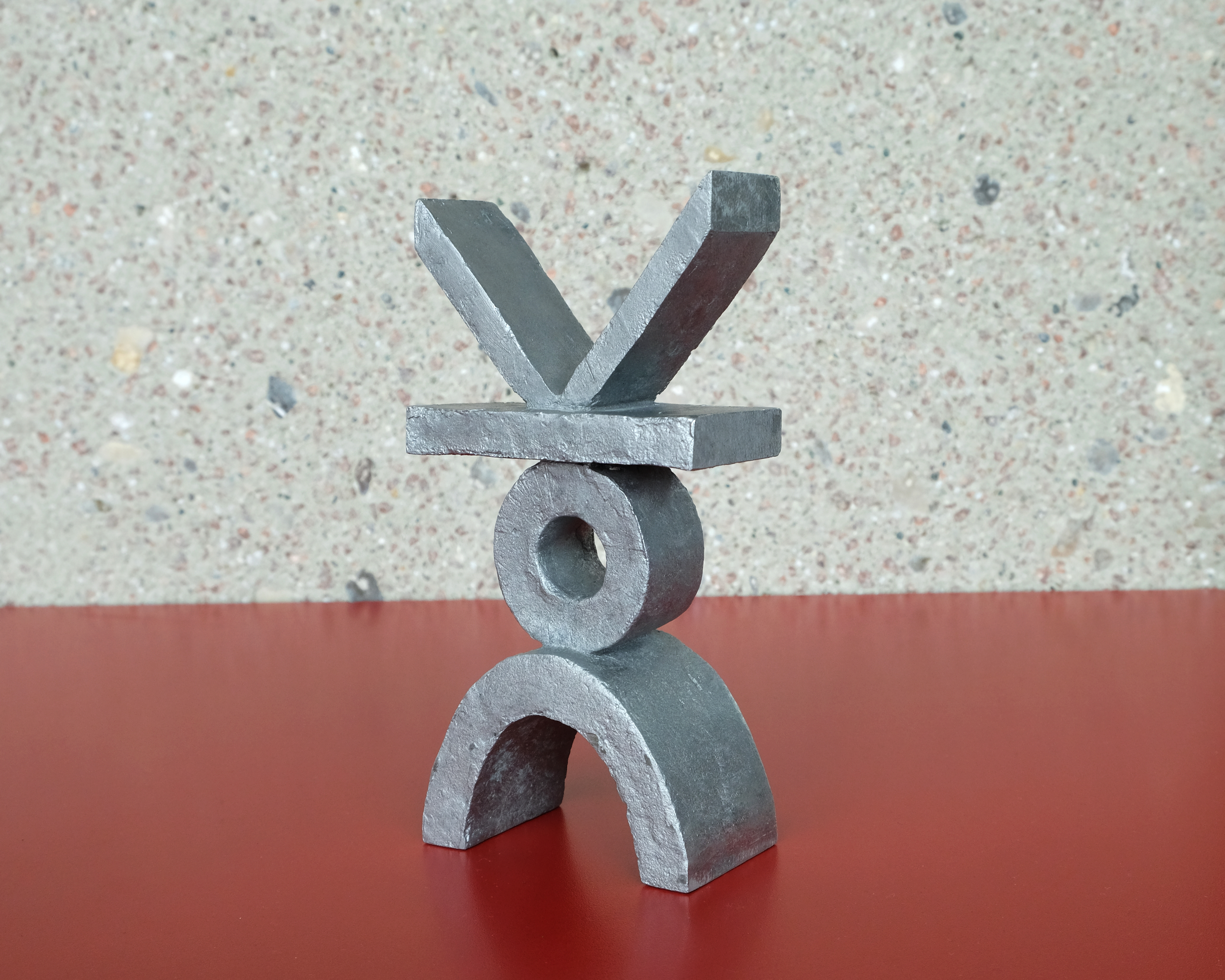
The festival's award statue "VICTORIA"

The festival program includes competition sections, theme sections and special series. Current international documentary films with a length of at least 52 minutes are screened. Film premieres are given special consideration in the competition sections. In 2025 the 16 prizes awarded in connection with the festival had a total value 64,200 Euro. The award statue given in each of the three main competition categories is named the VIKTORIA. Before 2025 it had been called VIKTOR.

=== VIKTORIA DOK.international – International Competition ===
This award is sponsored by the Bavarian public broadcaster Bayerischen Rundfunk.

- 2011: Der Fall Chodorkowski – Cyril Tuschi
- 2012: Six Million and One – David Fisher
- 2013: Sur le rivage du monde – Sylvain L' Espérance
- 2014: See No Evil – Jos de Putter
- 2015: Something Better To Come – Hanna Polak
- 2016: Natural Disorder – Christian Sønderby Jepsen
- 2017: Nowhere To Hide – Zaradasht Ahmed
- 2018: The Distant Barking of Dogs – Simon Lereng Wilmont
- 2019: Der nackte König – 18 Fragmente über Revolution – Andreas Hoessli
- 2020: Acasa, my home – Radu Ciorniciuc
- 2021: Anny – Helena Třeštíková
- 2022: Trenches – Loup Bureau
- 2023: Theatre of Violence – Lukasz Konopa, Emil Langballe
- 2024: Jōhatsu – Die sich in Luft auflösen – Andreas Hartmann, Arata Mori
- 2025: Silent Observers – Eliza Petkova

=== VIKTORIA DOK.deutsch – German Competition ===
This award is sponsored by the German media company Sky Deutschland.

- 2011: Wadans Welt – Dieter Schumann
- 2012: Das schlechte Feld – Bernhard Sallmann
- 2013: Der Imker – Mano Khalil
- 2014: Nirgendland – Helen Simon
- 2015: Aus dem Abseits – Simon Brückner
- 2016: Holz Erde Fleisch – Sigmund Steiner
- 2017: Bruder Jakob – Elí Roland Sachs
- 2018: I´m a bad guy – Susanne Freund
- 2019: Die bauliche Maßnahme – Nikolaus Geyrhalter
- 2020: Weiyena – Ein Heimatfilm – Weina Zhao und Judith Benedikt
- 2021: Zuhurs Töchter – Laurentia Genske und Robin Humboldt
- 2022: Zusammenleben – Thomas Fürhapter
- 2023: Gretas Geburt – Katja Baumgarten
- 2024: Zwischen uns Gott – Rebecca Hirneise
- 2025: Wir Erben – Simon Baumann

=== VIKTORIA DOK.horizonte Competition – Cinema of Urgency ===
This award is sponsored by the German charitable foundation Petra-Kelly-Stiftung.

- 2011: El Mocito – Marcela Said
- 2012: Bachelor Mountain – Yu Guangyi
- 2013: A World not Ours – Mahdi Fleifel
- 2014: Cantos – Charlie Petersmann
- 2015: Ce qu'il reste de la folie – Joris Lachaise
- 2016: A Maid For Each – Maher Abi Samra
- 2017: Motherland – Ramona S. Díaz
- 2018: Demons in Paradise – Jude Ratnam
- 2019: Está todo bien – Alles ist gut – Tuki Jencquel
- 2020: They call me Babu – Sandra Beerends
- 2021: Things we dare not do – Bruno Santamaria
- 2022: No Simple way home – Akuol de Mabior
- 2023: Le Spectre de Boku Haram – Cyrielle Raingou
- 2024: Kamay – Ilyas Yourish, Shahrokh Bikaran
- 2025: Rashid, l’enfant de Sinjar – Jasna Krajinovic

=== Awards by external sponsors ===
The following awards are given in special categories of filmmaking.

Award name	Years awarded	Sponsor	Comments
megaherz Student Award	2015-	megaherz, a Bavarian film production company	For an outstanding film by students at German-speaking film schools. Award: 3,000 euros
FFF-Förderpreis Dokumentarfilm	2011-	FilmFernsehFonds Bayern, a Bavarian film promotion company	For up-and-coming directors in Bavaria. Award: 5,000 euros
DOK.fest Prize SOS-Kinderdörfer weltweit	2014-	SOS Children's Villages, an international humanitarian organization, and B.O.A. Videofilmkunst	For films which depict the perspective of children and young people. Award: 3,000 euros
Kinokino Audience Award	2015-	3sat and Bayerischer Rundfunk, public broadcasting companies	Award: 2,000 euros.
German Documentary Film Music Prize	2015-	The cultural foundation of "Versicherungskammer", a Bavarian insurance company	For a composition that is combined in an outstanding way with the documentary film narrative. Award: 5,000 euros.
DOK.composition Award	2016-	Sonoton Music, a Munich music publisher and distributor	For compositions still in development. Award: 2,500 euros
VFF Documentary Film Production Prize	2018-	Verwertungsgesellschaft der Film- und Fernsehproduzenten (VFF), a film and television rights licensing agency	Recognizing outstanding, creative film production. Award: 7,500 euros
DOK.edit Award – presented by Adobe	2021-	Adobe, a computer software company	For outstanding film editing. Award: 5,000 euros.
DOK.talent Award	2015-	Haus des Dokumentarfilms, a non-profit center for documentary films in Stuttgart	For student projects at film schools. Award: 2,500 euros
DOK.archive Award	2019-	British Pathé	For film projects making use of archival material. Award: 2,500 euros
DOK.digital – Prize for New Narrative Formats	2020-	Bayerischen Landeszentrale für neue Medien (the Bavarian state agency for new media)	For journalistic-factual or documentary storytelling using a variety of media. Award: 2,500 euros
All Inclusive Award	2025-	Werksviertel-Mitte Stiftung, a Munich foundation promoting cultural diversity at grass-roots level	For film productions by teams that include people with disabilities in significant roles. Award: 5,000 euros

== Homages ==
- 2021: Helena Třeštíková
- 2022: Heidi Specogna
- 2023: Nikolaus Geyrhalter
- 2024: Petra Lataster-Czisch und Peter Lataster

== Retrospectives ==
- 2011: Klaus Wildenhahn
- 2012: Wim Wenders
- 2013: Werner Herzog
- 2014: Kim Longinotto
- 2015: Avi Mograbi
- 2016: Andres Veiel
- 2017: Georg Stefan Troller
- 2018: Helga Reidemeister
- 2019: Heddy Honigmann
- 2021: 75 Years of DEFA Documentary Films
- 2022: The Years under Franco's Dictatorship
- 2023: 10 Year Anniversary: DOK.network Africa
- 2025: Four Decades of DOK.fest
