= Václav Riedlbauch =

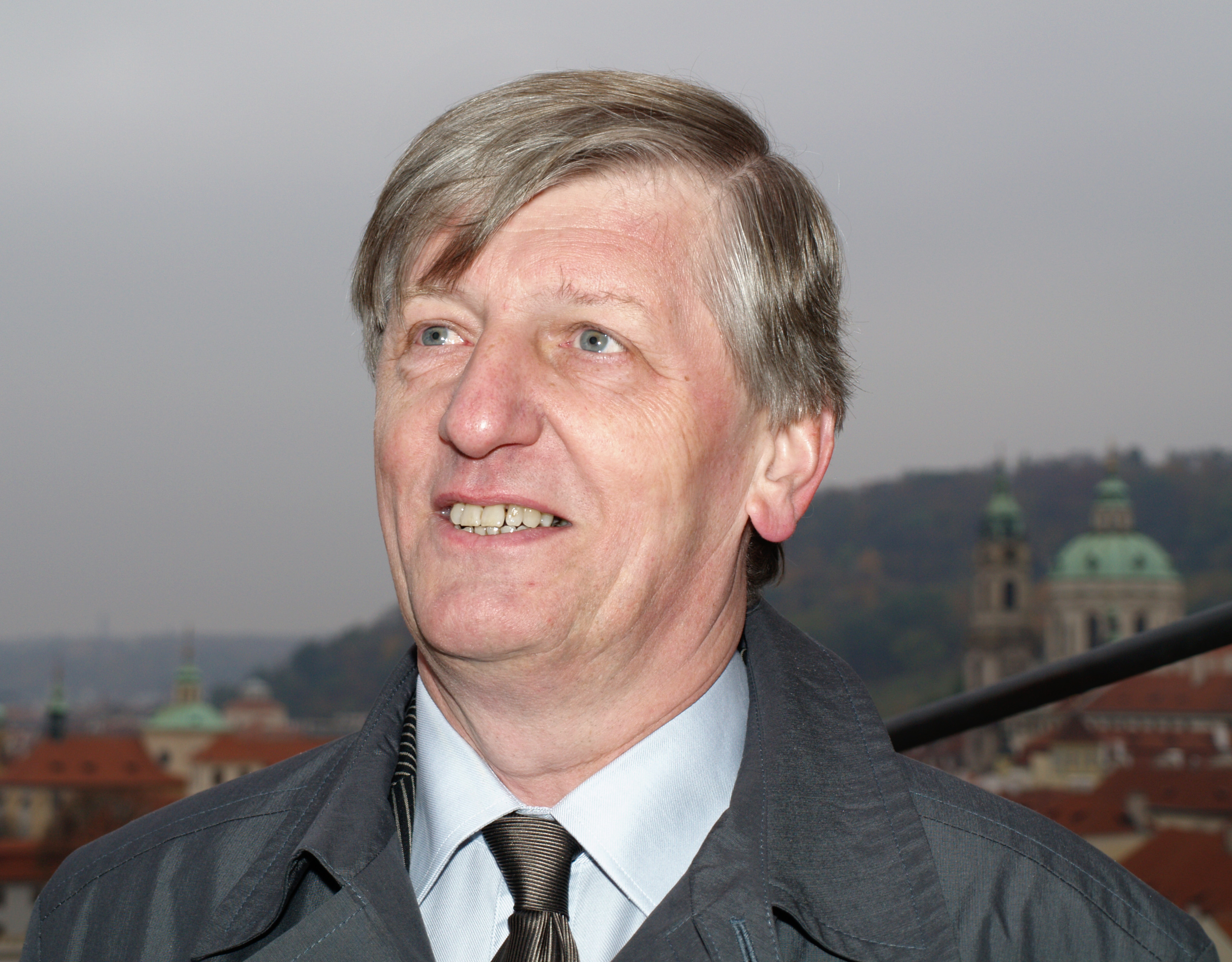

Minister of Culture
- In office 8 May 2009 – 13 July 2010
- Prime Minister: Jan Fischer
- Preceded by: Václav Jehlička
- Succeeded by: Jiří Besser

Personal details
- Born: 1 April 1947 Dýšina, Czechoslovakia
- Died: 3 November 2017 (aged 70) Prague, Czech Republic

Václav Riedlbauch (1 April 1947 – 3 November 2017) was a Czech composer, pedagogue and manager. He was the Minister of Culture in the caretaker government of Jan Fischer (2009–2010).

== Musician ==
Riedlbauch studied accordion with Josef Smetana and composition with Zdeňek Hůla at the Prague Conservatory from 1962 to 1968. He continued his studies at the Academy of Performing Arts in Prague in the class of Václav Dobiáš.

He was program director at the Prague Congress Centre, formerly the Palace of Culture, and director of the National Theatre in Prague and music publishing house Panton. From 2001, he was the Director General of the Czech Philharmonic Orchestra. Riedlbauch was a professor of composition at the Faculty of Music, Academy of Performing Arts in Prague.

== Selected compositions ==
Stage

- Macbeth, Ballet for soloist, a group of dancers and large orchestra (1979–1982); written for the National Theatre Ballet in Prague

Orchestral

- Sonáta "Rožmberská" (The Rožmberk Sonata) for winds and percussion instruments (1971)
- Symphony No. 1 (1972)
- Symphony No. 2 s refrénem (With Refrain) (1973)
- Smrtelná ronda (Deadly Rondos) (1975)
- Povídka (The Story), Symphonic Narration (1983)
- Vize (Vision), Fantasy in honor of the Czech Music Year 2004 (1985)
- Pokušení a čin (Temptation and Act), Macbethan Parable (1988)
- Příhoda (Adventure), Narration for concert wind orchestra (1988)
- Předehra ticha (Overture of Silence), 3 Pictures for a rather strange instrumental ensemble (2002)

Concertante

- Koncert-bitva (Concerto-Battle) for organ and orchestra (1973)
- Tři koncertní variace (Three Concert Variations) for flute and string orchestra (1990)

Chamber music

- Sonatina za Jakuba (Sonatina for James) for violin and piano (1971)
- Pastorále (Pastoral) for flute (1973)
- Obraz "Zátiší s mrtvým slavíkem" (Picture "Still Life with a Dead Nightingale") for flute and piano (1974)
- Báj (Tale) for flute, violin, cello and piano (1974)
- Lamento for clarinet and piano (1975)
- Balady (Ballads) for violin and piano (1975)
- Přiběhy (Stories) for bass clarinet and piano (1975)
- Allegri e pastorali [Woodwind Quintet No. 1] for woodwind quintet (1976)
- Vábení (Luring) for flute and piano (1977)
- Pastorali e concerti for brass quintet (1978)
- Concerti e trenodi for wind octet (1979)
- Nezmar (Hydra) for flute, accordion, 2 violins and percussion (1979)
- Doslov (Epilogue), Movement for saxophone quartet (1983)
- Svlékání hadí kůže (Snake Moulting) for trombone solo (1986)
- Výjev (Scene), Movement for bassoon and piano (1986)
- String Quartet No. 1 "Památce Josefa Čapka a jemu podobných" (In Memory of Josef Čapek and the Others) (1986–1987)
- Novoroční meditace (A New Year Meditation) for trumpet and organ (1989)
- Preludia k vernisážím (Preludes to the Exhibition's Openings) for flute solo (1990)
- Trio for violin, cello and piano (1991)
- Malý kamenný tanec (A Small Stone Dance), Trio for flute, cello and piano (1993)
- Woodwind Quintet No. 2 (1999)
- Duetto Pocta Manuelu Poncemu (A Tribute to Manuel Ponce) for flute and guitar

Keyboard

- Katedrály (Cathedrals), Toccata for organ (1972)
- Noční stráž (Night Watch), 2 Allegros for accordion (1974)
- Kánony (Canons) for piano (1977)
- Parade for Organ (1978)
- Loutky (Puppets) for accordion (1980)
- Závěs (The Curtain), Movement for organ (1982)
- Konjunkce (Conjunction), Game for 2 organs or other keyboard instruments (1983)

Instructive works

- Pražský speciálník (Special Book of Prague), Book of Polyphonic Compositions for accordion (1972)
- Pastorale for 3 recorders (1973)
- Čaroděj (The Wizard), Accordion School for children (1973–1976)
- Jihočeská nokturna (South Bohemian Nocturnes) for 2 violins, cello, accordion and trumpet (1979)
- Převrácenky (Reversals) for children's accordion (1980)
- Povídačky (Talks), 8 Polyphonic Pieces for 2 violins (1982)
- Flétnový sešit (Flute Notebook), Miniatures for 2–5 flutes (1986)

Vocal

- Touženec písní, Songs for tenor and piano (1975); words by Rabindranath Tagore
- Písničky z Rejdové (Songs from Rejdová) for soprano, alto, violin and piano (1976)
- Tesknice (Nostalgic Songs), 3 Folk Songs for 2 recorders and 3-part children's choir (1976)
- Svatební zpívání (Wedding Singing) for girls', female or male chorus (1978); words after Sappho
- Nebocyklus pro děti (Rather-Or Cycle for Children), 7 children's choruses (1978); words by R. Steindl
- Zpěvy a hry na úryvky ze Shakespeara (Songs and Games to Excerpts from Shakespeare) for 6 singers, 2 violins, oboe and cello (1979)
- Kantorská: Oslava českého baroka (Teachers' Song: Celebration of Bohemian Baroque) for organ and children's chorus (1980); words by V. Fischer
- Slabikář: Úryvky ze školních začátků (The Primer: Excerpts from the Beginnings at School), 4 Polyphonic Pieces for children's chorus (1980)
- Daidalos tvůrce (Daidalos the Creator) for male chorus with baritone solo (1982); words after Ovid
- Podzim v Praze (Autumn in Prague) for baritone and orchestra (2000)
