= Silent City Driver =

2024 Mongolian drama film

- Theatrical release poster
- Mongolian: Чимээгүй хотын жолооч
- Directed by: Janchivdorj Sengedorj
- Written by: Janchivdorj Sengedorj; Nomuunzul Turmunkh
- Produced by: Ganbaatar Narantsetseg; Naranbat Bayasgalan, Bold Ganbat
- Starring: Tuvshinbayar Amartuvshin; Narantsetseg Ganbaatar
- Cinematography: Enkhbayar Enkhtur
- Edited by: Munkhbat Shirnen
- Music by: Serge Gainsbourg (song Comme un boomerang)
- Production companies: Dominion Tech; Nomadia Pictures; Ddish; MFIA
- Release date: 21 November 2024 (PÖFF)
- Running time: 138 minutes
- Country: Mongolia
- Language: Mongolian

Silent City Driver (Mongolian: Чимээгүй хотын жолооч) is 2024 Mongolian drama film written and directed by Janchivdorj Sengedorj. The film follows a 32-year-old Myagmar, who after serving 14 years in prison for his involvement in a murder case, emerges to face societal rejection and health challenges from a prison beating, finding solace only in caring for stray dogs.

The solemn song "Comme un boomerang (Chanson)", "Like a boomerang", written and composed by Serge Gainsbourg, released in 1975 plays repeatedly in the film, reflecting Myagmar’s emotional pain through its lyric, "I feel booms and bangs shake my wounded heart." This haunting refrain underscores the deep impact the story has on all its characters.

It competed in and had its premiere on November 21, 2024, at the 28th Tallinn Black Nights Film Festival, where it won Grand Prix for Best Film. It was selected as the Mongolian entry for the Best International Feature Film at the 98th Academy Awards, but it was not nominated.

== Premise ==
Silent City Driver follows Myagmar, a 32-year-old man recently released from prison after serving 14 years for manslaughter. Struggling with poor health and the trauma of his past, he finds comfort in caring for stray dogs. He begins working as a hearse driver and forms deep connections with two individuals: a young Buddhist monk and Saruul, the daughter of a blind coffin-maker. Their lives become quietly intertwined in the shadow of death and healing.

== Cast ==
- Tuvshinbayar Amartuvshin as Myagmar
- Narantsetseg Ganbaatar as Saruul
- Bat-Erdene Munkhbat

== Release ==
Silent City Driver had its premiere in the 'Official Selection - Competition' at the Tallinn Black Nights Film Festival on 21 November 2024, where it won Grand Prix. On 16 December 2024, it was presented in the World Cinema section of International Film Festival of Kerala.

On 17 March 2025, it had its Japanese Premiere at the Osaka Asian Film Festival.

It was also selected at 27th edition of Far East Film Festival and was screened on 29 April 2025, where it won the Purple Mulberry Award.

In June 2025, it competed in International Competition at the Bishkek International Film Festival and won Best Director and Best Performance awards.

On 26 October it was screened at the Hong Kong Asian Film Festival in the Wide Angle section.

== Reception ==
Marina D. Richter reviewing for Asian Movie Pulse at Tallinn Black Nights Film Festival, praised Silent City Driver as "a movie that stays with the audience for a very long time," describing it as a standout discovery at the Tallinn Black Nights Film Festival. She noted that its selection as the top winner by the Official Selection Jury was well deserved, and expressed confidence in its global appeal, suggesting it could "conquer the hearts of the spectators across the globe." Richter also commended the film's pacing, calling it "one of the rare examples of recent movies whose length doesn’t impose any challenge," with every minute "completely justified."

== Accolades ==
Award	Ceremony date	Category	Recipient(s)	Result	Ref.
Tallinn Black Nights Film Festival	24 November 2024	Grand Prix Best Film	Silent City Driver	Won	
Tallinn Black Nights Film Festival	24 November 2024	Best Production Design	Munkhbat Shirnen	Won	
Asia Pacific Screen Awards	27 November 2025	Best Director	Sengedorj Janchivdorj	Nominated	

== See also ==
- List of submissions to the 98th Academy Awards for Best International Feature Film
- List of Mongolian submissions for the Academy Award for Best International Feature Film
