= Zoljargal Purevdash =

Mongolian film director

- Born: Ulaanbaatar, Mongolia
- Education: J. F. Oberlin University
- Occupations: Film director; screenwriter; producer
- Years active: 2012–present

Zoljargal Purevdash (Mongolian: Пүрэвдаш Золжаргал; born 1990) is a Mongolian filmmaker.

== Early life ==
Born in Ulaanbaatar, Purevdash excelled at maths and physics in her youth and earned a scholarship to a prestigious high school, where she joined the drama club. She won another scholarship to study filmmaking at the J. F. Oberlin University in Japan.

== Career ==
Her first short film Over the City, Under the Sky (2010) won the Cinema Club Award from the West Tokyo City Film Festival. After graduating from film school in Japan, she returned to Mongolia and worked on films as a first assistant director. Later she directed two experimental short films called Burgundy (2013) and Outliers (2017), both of which screened at the Altan Khalis Independent Film Festival.

Her feature film directorial debut, If Only I Could Hibernate, made its world premiere at the 2023 Cannes Film Festival on 21 May 2023, in the Un Certain Regard section. She became the first Mongolian director in Cannes’ official selection. The film was also invited to the 28th Busan International Film Festival in 'A Window on Asian Cinema' section where it was screened in October 2023.

In March 2024, the film won both the Grand Prize and the Cineuropa Prize at the 39th Mons Love International Film Festival in Mons, Belgium.

A Sight and Sound review said her first film showed "great ambition and promise".

=== Accolades ===
| Award | Date of ceremony | Category | Recipient(s) | Result | Ref. |
|---|---|---|---|---|---|
| Cannes Film Festival | 27 May 2023 | Un Certain Regard | Zoljargal Purevdash | Nominated | |
| Tokyo FILMeX | 26 November 2023 | Special Jury Prize (Shared with Critical Zone) | Zoljargal Purevdash | Won | |
| Mons Love International Film Festival | 16 March 2024 | Grand Prize | Zoljargal Purevdash | Won | |
| Mons Love International Film Festival | 16 March 2024 | Cineuropa Prize | Zoljargal Purevdash | Won | |

== Filmography ==
| Year | Title | Director | Writer | Screenwriter | Notes |
|---|---|---|---|---|---|
| 2022 | Yellow Bus | Yes | Yes | Yes | Short |
| 2017 | Stairs | Yes | Yes | Yes | Short |
| 2021 | Naked Bulb | Yes | Yes | Yes | Short |
| 2023 | If Only I Could Hibernate | Yes | Yes | Yes | |
