= Hanna Polak =

Polish director, cinematographer and producer

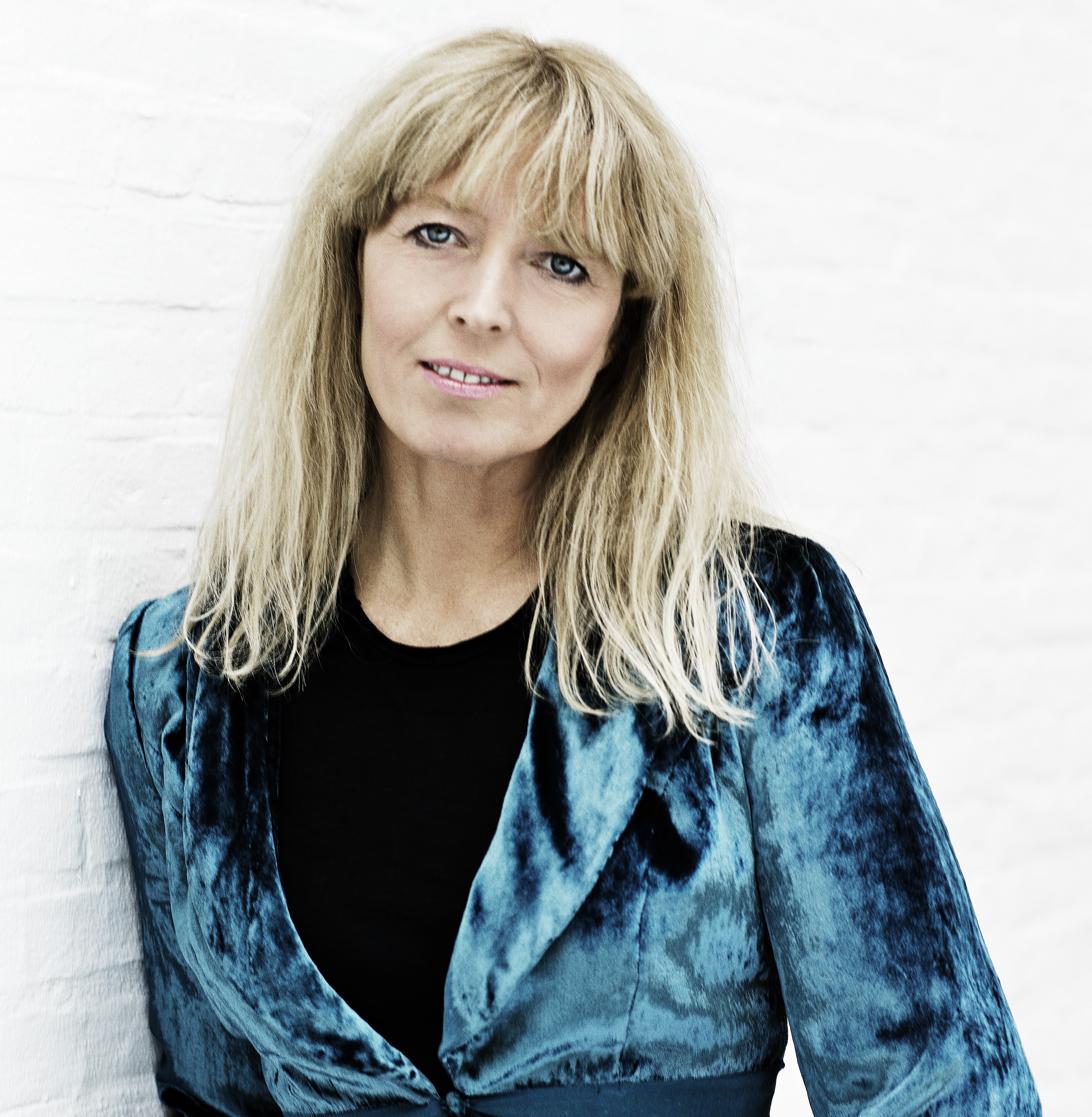
Hanna Polak

Hanna Polak (born 1967) is a Polish director, cinematographer and producer. For her short documentary film, The Children of Leningradsky, about a community of homeless children living in the Leningradsky railway station in Moscow, she was nominated for an Academy Award and an Emmy Award. In 2003, she was awarded Best Producer of Documentary Movies at the Kraków Film Festival for Railway Station Ballad.

== Early life ==
She was born in 1967 in Katowice, Poland.

From 1987 to 1988 she worked as a stage performer in the Theatre of Entertainment, Chorzov. From 1989 to 1991 Polak studied acting and theatre at the Acting School in Wroclaw and Warsaw. She graduated with the master's degree from the Cinematography division of the Gerasimov Institute of Cinematography (VGIK), in Moscow.

== Career ==
In 2004, Polak completed her documentary film, The Children of Leningradsky, which was nominated for an Academy Award for Best Documentary (Short Subject). It also received the Best Documentary Achievement Award from the International Documentary Association and it was nominated for an Emmy Award in two categories: Best Documentary and Outstanding Individual Achievement in a Craft: Editing. This film was also nominated to be a Notable Video by the Adult American Library Association, and it has received the Gracie Allen Award, given by the American Women in Radio & Television, amongst many other awards.

Polak's additional works include, Al - Tribute to Albert Maysles; Faces of Homelessness; Battle of Warsaw 1920 in 3D, and many others. She directed and produced Love and Rubbish, for the Why Poverty? series in 2012, which won A Corto di Donne Women's Short Film Festival.

In 2014, Polak has completed her documentary film Something Better To Come, which received the International Documentary Film Festival Amsterdam (IDFA) Special Jury Award, and won main prizes at several film festivals, including Filmfest München, Munich International Documentary Film Festival, Documentary Edge Festival, Docs Against Gravity, ArtDoc Fest in Moscow, Trieste Film Festival, EuroDok Film Festival, International Film Festival and Forum on Human Rights, One World Film Festival and won other film festivals and awards. Polak's works as a producer, director, and cinematographer have appeared on major television networks worldwide including American HBO, ABC (American Broadcasting Company), Canal+, France 2, Fuji Television, ITN, TVP (Telewizja Polska), TVN (Poland), Belgian Radio and TV, and many other TV stations. Her films have been screened in hundreds film festivals around the world, including Sundance Film Festival, International Documentary Film Festival Amsterdam (IDFA), Hot Springs Documentary Film Festival, True/False Film Festival, and FIPA (Festival International de Programmes Audiovisuels).

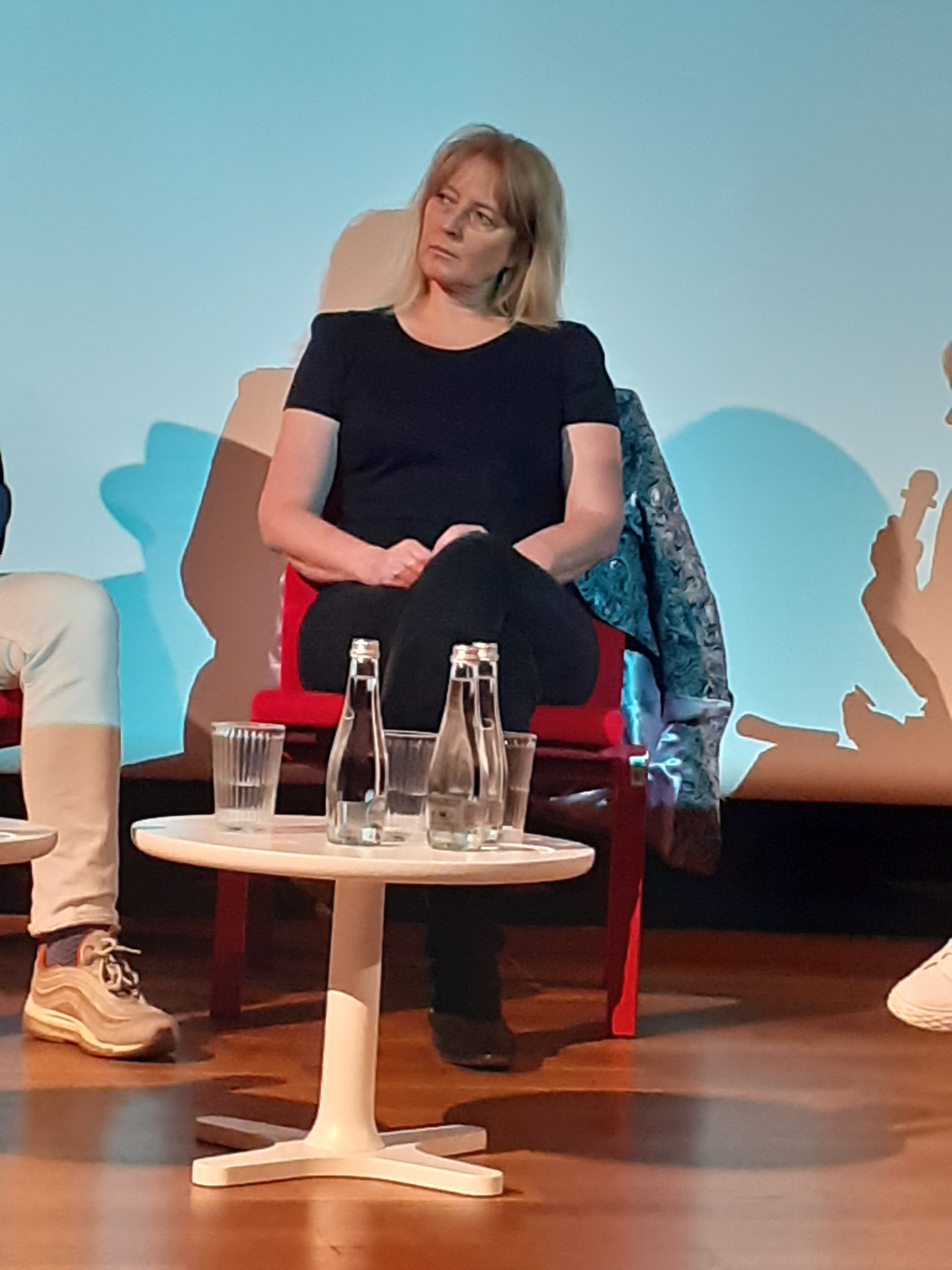
Hanna Polak in 2023.

In 2006, Polak's photography works won her third prize in the UNICEF International Photography Competition Photo of the Year. For her cinematography work for Stone Silence, shot in Afghanistan, she was awarded with the Artistic Mastery of Photographing award from the Kiev Film Festival. For her cinematography work for Something Better To Come, she was awarded with the Best Cinematography award from Gdańsk DocFilm Festival and with Canon Non Fiction Frame Special Mention from Docs Against Gravity film festival, as well as the Youth Jury Award at the FIFDH 2015.

Polak has collaborated with different aid agencies to help unprivileged children. For her charitable efforts, Polak was awarded the prestigious Golden Heart Award, the “Award for serving the uppermost ideals of mankind” by NTV (Russia), and the Crystal Mirror award by the Mirror magazine in Poland, an award that recognizes “people of dialogue, those who unite, not divide.”

She has lectured on documentary filmmaking at many universities worldwide, including UNC Gillings School of Global Public Health, North Carolina, Chapel Hill; University of Guadalajara, Mexico; North Texas University; Monterey Institute of International Studies, California; Middlebury College, Vermont; University of Hawaii, Honolulu, and many others.

Polak was a jury member at the Kraków Film Festival and the Document International Human Rights Documentary Film Festival in Glasgow, Scotland; she was a tutor for the EsoDoc workshop; and she was an expert for the Ministry of Culture and National Heritage (Poland), evaluating documentary projects for the Polish Film Institute.

== Filmography ==
- Something Better to Come (2014) — writer, director, cinematographer
- The Officer’s Wife (2010) — cinematographer
- Warsaw Battle 1920 in 3D (2010) — director, cinematographer
- Faces of Homelessness (2010) — director, cinematographer
- Kamienna Cisza (2007) — cinematographer
- The Children of Leningradsky (2005) — director, cinematographer, producer
- Al Tribute to Albert Maysles (2004) — director, cinematographer, producer
- Railway Station Ballad (2003) — cinematographer, producer
