= Veins of the World =

2020 Mongolian drama film

- Film poster
- German: Die Adern der Welt
- Directed by: Byambasuren Davaa
- Written by: Byambasuren Davaa
- Produced by: Ansgar Frerich; Eva Kemme; Tobias Siebert
- Starring: Bat-Ireedüi Batmönkh: Enerel Tümen; Yalalt Namsrai; Älgirchamin Baatarsüren; Äriunbyamba Sükhee
- Cinematography: Talal Khoury
- Edited by: Anne Jünemann
- Music by: John Gürtler; Jan Miserre
- Release dates: 23 February 2020 (Berlinale); 29 July 2021 (Germany)
- Running time: 96 minutes
- Countries: Mongolia; Germany
- Language: Mongolian

Veins of the World (German: Die Adern der Welt) is a 2020 Mongolian drama film written and directed by Byambasuren Davaa. It was selected as the Mongolian entry for the Best International Feature Film at the 93rd Academy Awards but was not nominated.

== Summary ==
Amra, an 11-year-old Mongolian boy, lives a life divided between the relative modernity of school and the traditional nomadic lifestyle of his family. He is the son of Erdene, who has led opposition to mining companies that seek to exploit Mongolia's natural resources. After Erdene's unexpected death in an accident, Amra decides to follow in his father's footsteps.

== Cast ==
- Bat-Ireedui Batmunkh as Amra
- Purevdorj Uranchimeg as Bataa
- Algirchamin Baatarsuren as Altaa
- Enerel Tumen as Zaya
- Yalalt Namsrai as Erdene

== Release ==
The film had its world premiere at the 70th Berlin International Film Festival on 23 February 2020, where it was shown in the Generation Kplus section.

International sales were handled by Global Screen, a division of Telepool. Regional distributors included Les Films du Préau in France, Surtsey Films in Spain, Angel Films in Scandinavia, Filmcoopi in Switzerland, and Pandora Film in Germany. The film's official release in Germany was on 29 July 2021.

== Reception ==
Writing for Screen Daily, Wendy Ide noted that the cinematography made effective use of the Mongolian landscape and called the film "more than an ethnographic curiosity" but predicted that its bleaker tone compared to Davaa's other pictures might prevent it from doing well outside the festival circuit. Phuong Le, writing for The Guardian, called Batmunkh's committed performance "an emotional anchor that keeps the film clear of maudlin abstraction." Britta Schmeiss, in a review for epd Film, stated that the film strikes a gentle, understated tone and praised the cinematography of Talal Khoury.

The film was Mongolia's submission to the Best International Feature Film at the 93rd Academy Awards. On the international circuit, the film won the Grand Prize in the Fiction and Human Rights section of the 2021 International Film Festival and Forum on Human Rights, as well as the Youth Jury Prize.

== See also ==
- List of submissions to the 93rd Academy Awards for Best International Feature Film
- List of Mongolian submissions for the Academy Award for Best International Feature Film
