= The Children of Genghis =

2017 film

- Film poster
- Directed by: Zolbayar Dorj
- Written by: Zolbayar Dorj
- Starring: Brittany Belt
- Cinematography: Angarag Davaasuren
- Edited by: Gantulga Urtnasan
- Music by: Ulziibayar Shatar
- Release dates: 21 May 2017 (Cannes); 30 June 2017 (Mongolia)
- Running time: 90 minutes
- Country: Mongolia
- Language: Mongolian

The Children of Genghis (Mongolian: Chingisiin huuhduud) is a 2017 Mongolian drama film directed by Zolbayar Dorj. It was selected as the Mongolian entry for the Best Foreign Language Film at the 90th Academy Awards, but it was not nominated.

== Plot ==
A young boy in the Mongolian countryside trains for a horse race.

== Cast ==
- Brittany Belt as Sarah Jones (UNICEF officer)
- Ankhnyam Ragchaa as Tsetsegee (Dambii's wife)
- Batmend Baast as Dambii

== See also ==
- List of submissions to the 90th Academy Awards for Best Foreign Language Film
- List of Mongolian submissions for the Academy Award for Best Foreign Language Film
