= Something Better to Come =

- Film poster
- Directed by: Hanna Polak
- Written by: Hanna Polak
- Produced by: Sigrid Dyekjær; Hanna Polak
- Starring: Yula
- Cinematography: Hanna Polak
- Edited by: Marcin Bastkowski
- Music by: Kristian Eidnes Andersen
- Release date: 12 December 2014 (Artdocfest)
- Running time: 98 minutes
- Countries: Poland; Denmark
- Language: Russian

Something Better to Come is a Danish-Polish documentary film about children living on a garbage dump near Moscow directed by Oscar-nominated filmmaker Hanna Polak and produced by Sigrid Dyekjær of Danish Documentary. Something Better to Come won the Special Jury Award at the IDFA documentary festival , where the film had premiered.

== Content ==
In 2000, in parallel with shooting The Children of Leningradsky, Hanna began working on Something Better to Come. This was the same year Vladimir Putin stepped into power in Russia and coincidentally, the story of Yula, the main character of the film, is parallel to the unfolding story of Putin's Russia.

Ten-year-old Yula has but one dream – to lead a normal life. For 14 years, Hanna Polak follows Yula as she grows up in the forbidden territory of Svalka, the garbage dump located 13 miles from the Kremlin in Putin's Russia. Something Better to Come is Yula's story – a dramatic tale of coming of age and maturing to the point of taking destiny into one's own hands. It is a story of hope, courage, and life, all shot in gripping vérité style that stuns with its directness and immediacy.

== Reception ==
The film has received wide positive acclaim from critics. Mark Adams from Screen Daily stated that Something Better to Come is "strikingly visceral and plaintively moving documentary that is arresting right from its first powerful moments" and added that "This is a film that packs an emotional punch and is strikingly directed and shot by the talented Hanna Polak." Aleksandr Gorbachev from Newsweek called the film "a great coming-of-age story – Boyhood from a trash can." Sheri Linden from The Los Angeles Times described the film as "work of powerful images – heart-rending, elegiac, charged with hope." Joshua Oppenheimer, director of The Act of Killing, stated that his "most powerful experience of nonfiction cinema this year was [...] Something Better to Come." While Neil Young from The Hollywood Reporter reviewed it as "an eye-opening documentary."

=== Awards ===
- Special Jury Prize International Documentary, Hot Springs Documentary Film Festival (USA)
- Youth Jury Award, Nuremberg International Human Rights Film Festival (Germany)
- Best Documentary Award, Jameson CineFest (Hungary)
- Berlin's Favorite Award and Bremen's Favourite Award, Favourites Film Festival Berlin (Germany)
- The Estonian People's Award, Pärnu Film Festival (Estonia)
- Best Documentary, Valletta Film Festival (Malta)
- Best International Feature Award, Documentary Edge Festival (New Zealand)
- Best Cinematography, Gdansk DocFilm Festival (Poland)
- Special Mention, Underhill Festival (Montenegro)
- Special Award Club 418 Mirror of Art DocFest and Small Mirror of Art DocFest, Andrey Tarkovsky International Film Festival (Russia)
- Millennium Award for Best Feature Documentary Film and Canon Non Fiction Frame Special Mention, Docs Against Gravity (Poland)
- VIKTOR Main Competition DOK.international, DOK.fest Munich (Germany
- Second prize of the Jury, DocumentaMadrid (Spain)
- Special Mention, One World Brussels (Belgium)
- Jury's Main Prize, Eurodok – European Documentary Film Festival (Norway)
- Special Mention, ZagrebDox (Croatia)
- Grand Prix, Open Documentary Film Festival "Artdocfest" (Russia)
- Youth Jury Award, International Film Festival and Forum on Human Rights (Switzerland)
- Alpe Adria Cinema Award: Best Documentary, Trieste Film Festival (Italy)
- Special Jury Award, International Documentary Film Festival Amsterdam (IDFA) (Netherlands)
