= Václav Jehlička =

Czech politician

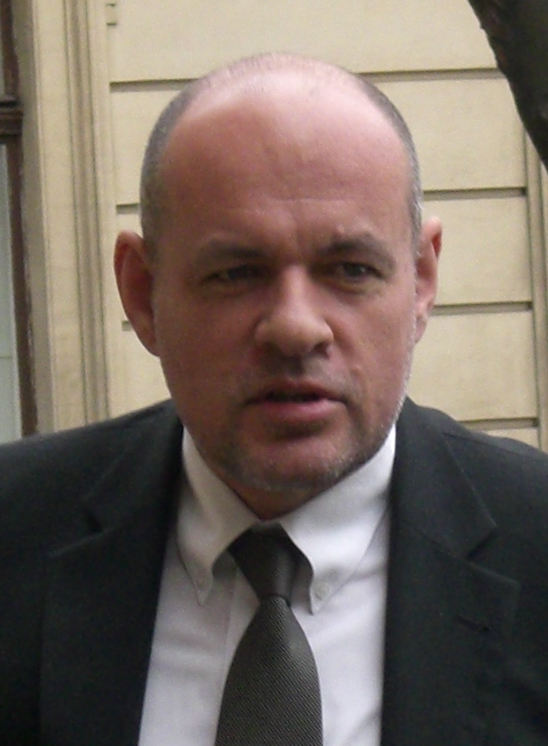

Minister of Culture
- In office 26 January 2007 – 8 May 2009
- Prime Minister: Mirek Topolánek
- Preceded by: Helena Třeštíková
- Succeeded by: Václav Riedlbauch

Personal details
- Born: 24 March 1948 (age 78) Domažlice, Czechoslovakia
- Party: KDU-ČSL

Václav Jehlička (born 24 March 1948 in Domažlice) is a Czech politician. In 1996 he was elected a member of the Senate and from January 2007 to May 2009 he was Minister of Culture.

He worked as a teacher until 1990. Then he served two full terms as Mayor of Telč from 1990 to 1998 and a half term from 2001 to 2002.

Jehlička is a graduate of the University of South Bohemia. He's married and has five children.
