= Bavarian Film Awards (documentary film) =

This is a list of the winners of the Bavarian Film Awards Prize for best documentary film.

- 1989 Axel Engstfeld
- 1990 Donatello & Fosco Dubini, Wolfgang Meyer
- 1991 Peter Schamoni
- 1992 Heiner Stadler
- 1993 Juraj Herz, Dagmar Wagner
- 1995 Peter Schamoni
- 1996 Stefan Schwietert
- 2001 Andres Veiel
- 2002 Douglas Wolfsperger
- 2003 Byambasuren Davaa
- 2005 Philip Gröning
- 2006 Florian Borchmeyer & Matthias Hentschler
- 2007 Pepe Danquart
- 2009 Petra Seeger
- 2010 Jens Schanze
- 2011 Arnon Goldfinger
- 2012 Markus Imhoof
- 2013 Leopold Grün and Dirk Uhlig
- 2014 Nadav Schirman
- 2015 Jens Schanze
- 2016 Andreas Voigt
- 2017 Yasemin Şamdereli and Nesrin Şamdereli
- 2018 Markus Imhoof
- 2019 Janna Ji Wonders
- 2020 Bettina Böhler
