= Helena Třeštíková =

Czech documentary film director (born 1949)

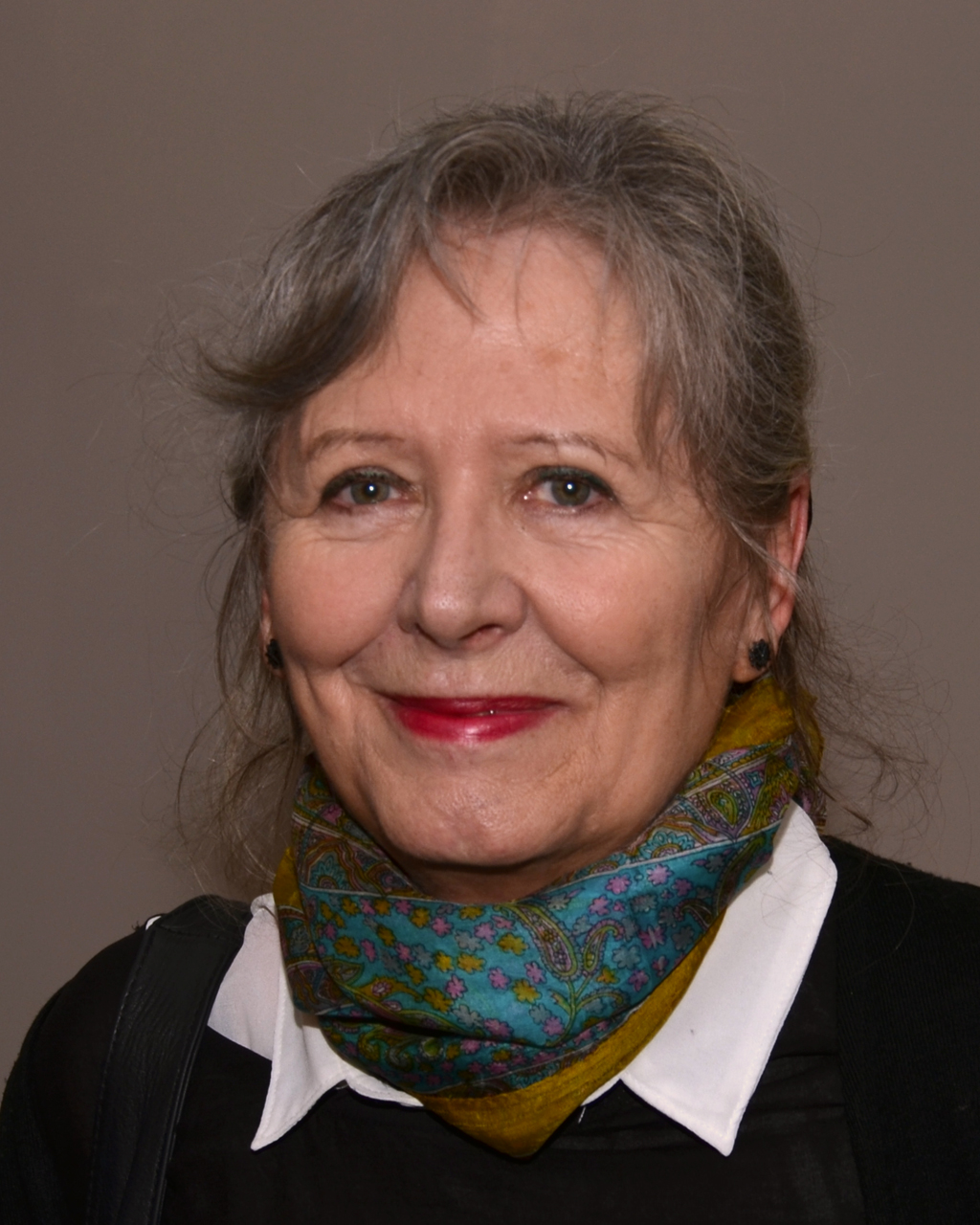
- Třeštíková in 2018

Minister of Culture
- In office 9 January 2007 – 26 January 2007
- Preceded by: Martin Štěpánek
- Succeeded by: Václav Jehlička

Personal details
- Born: Helena Böhmová; 22 June 1949 (age 77) Prague, Czechoslovakia
- Education: Film and TV School of the Academy of Performing Arts in Prague
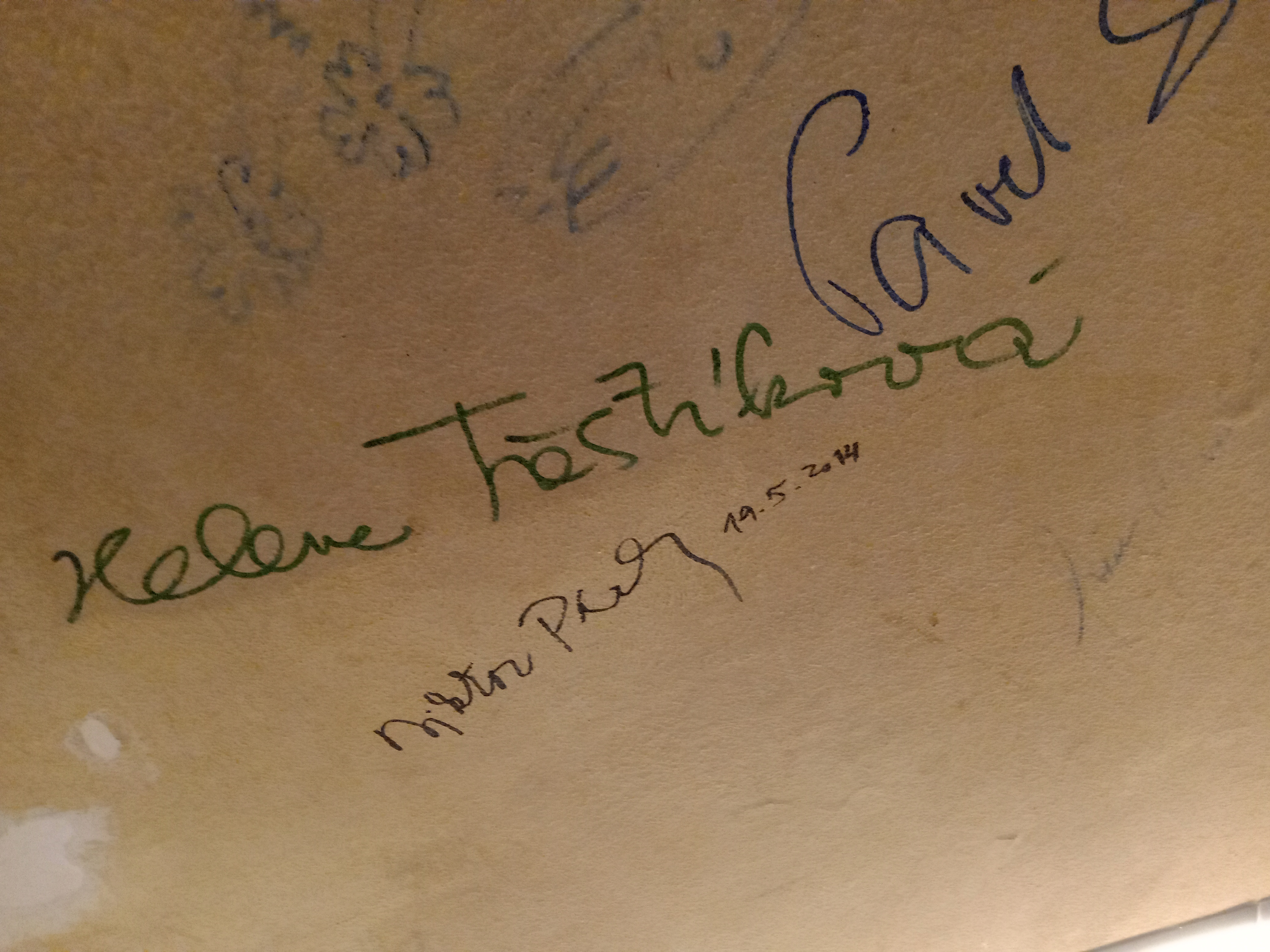
- Signature

Helena Třeštíková (born 22 June 1949) is a Czech documentary film director. She became known for making "time-lapse" long-term observational documentary films that won many awards. She briefly served as the Minister of Culture of the Czech Republic. Since 2017, she also has been a university teacher.

== Early life and education ==
Helena Třeštíková was born Böhmová on 22 June 1949 in Prague. She grew up in a house at Wenceslas Square. She graduated from the high school in 1968, at the time of the Prague Spring. In summer 1968, she went to West Germany to work as an au-pair, to get praxis necessary to get accepted to the Film and TV School of the Academy of Performing Arts in Prague (FAMU). In 1969, she visited Paris, which motivated her to become a film director.

== Career ==
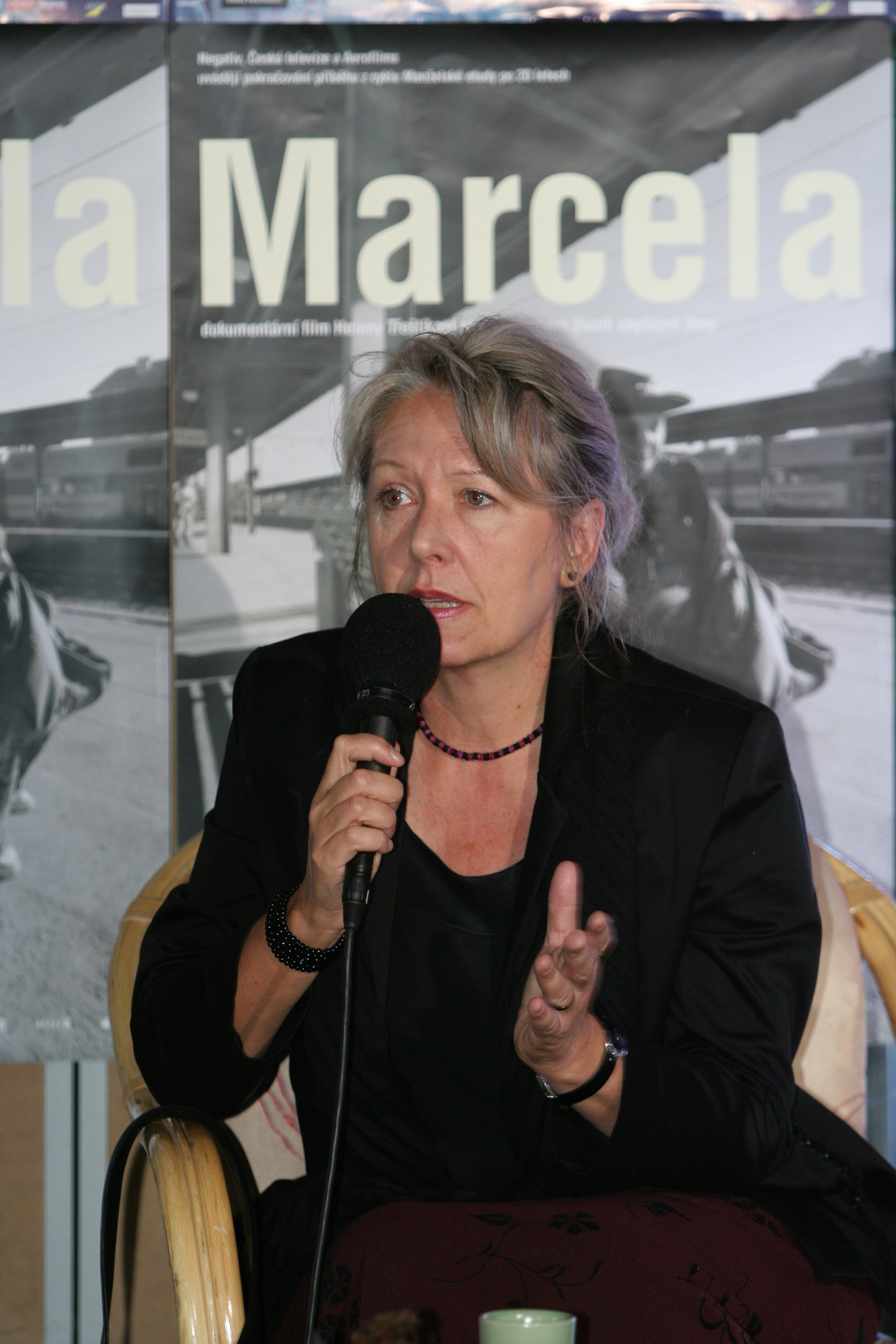
Třeštíková in 2007

In 1969–1975, she studied documentary film at FAMU. Her first film was Zázrak (1975). While searching for a topic for her work, she was interested in the development of human personalities and destinies over a long time horizon, so in 1980 she began filming Manželské etudy ("Marriage Stories") using the so-called time-lapse method, in which she followed the destinies of several married couples for six years. She also used this method to film her other documentaries (also following the fates of various people), which won many awards.

Since 2017, Třeštíková is a university teacher at FAMU, working in the documentary film department.

In 2019, Třeštíková became a member of the Academy of Motion Picture Arts and Sciences that decides the awarding of the Academy Awards (Oscars). She is also member of the European Film Academy.

=== Selected works ===
Her most successful documentary films include:

- Marriage Stories (1980–1987)
- Sweet Century (1997)
- Hitler, Stalin and Myself (2001)
- Marriage Stories after 20 Years (2005)
- Marcela (2006)
- René (2008)
- Katka (2009)
- Mallory (2015)
- Anny (2020) – won the main prize at 2021 Munich International Documentary Film Festival
- René – Vězeň svobody (2021)

== Family ==
Her husband is Michael Třeštík (born 1947), a writer and producer of his wife's films. He and Helena Třeštíková co-wrote two books on documentary film. Both of their children are public figures: Tomáš (born 1978), a photographer; and Hana (born 1982), a film director, producer, influencer and local politician.

== Politics ==
Třeštíková was briefly the Minister of Culture of the Czech Republic. She resigned from the position in January 2007 after serving less than three weeks.

== Decorations ==
In 2024, Třeštíková was awarded by the Czech Republic's Medal of Merit (First Class) for services to the state in the field of culture.

In 2024, Třeštíková was also awarded by the France's Ordre des Arts et des Lettres for the spread of art and literature in France and around the world.
