= Alain Kassanda =

Congolese film-maker and cinematographer

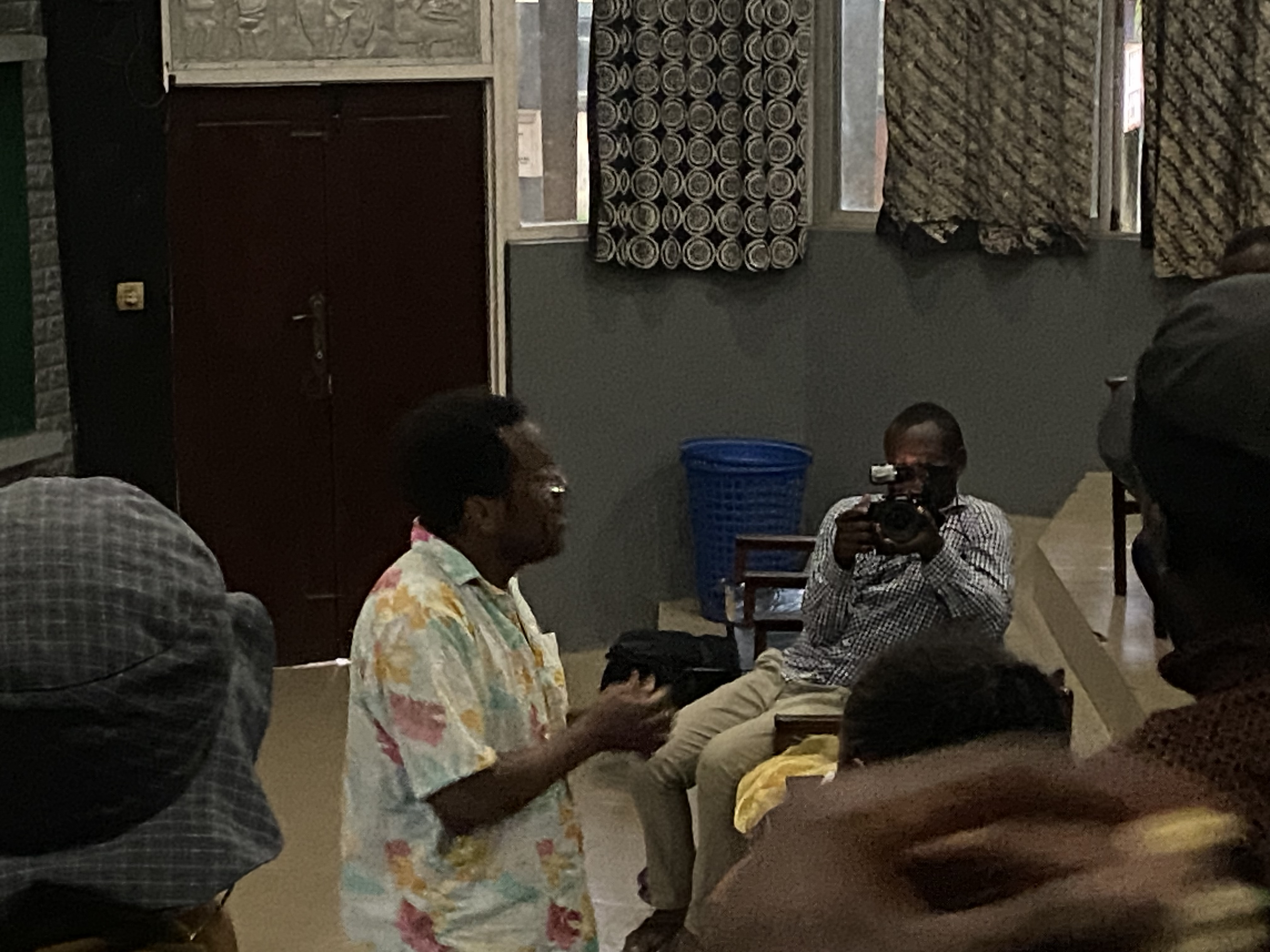
- Alain Kassanda at the Nigerian premier of Coconut Head generation at the TFS Movie club University of Ibadan
- Born: Kinshasa, Democratic Republic of the Congo
- Occupation: Film-maker

Alain Kassanda is a Congolese French film maker, film director and cinematographer, and founder of Ajímatí Films. He is known for his highly acclaimed documentary films Trouble Sleep (2020), Colette & Justin (2022), and Coconut Head Generation (2023).

== Early life ==
Born in Kinshasa, Kassanda left the Democratic Republic of the Congo for France at the age of 11. After studying communication, he began staging movie screenings and several film festivals in various Parisian theaters in 2003, and he was the film programmer for the movie theater Les 39 Marches in Sevran, near Paris, for five years. He moved to Ibadan in 2015, where he shot his first medium-length film.

== Career, recognition and awards ==
Kassanda's works have been screened at major film festivals across the globe, including the International Documentary Film Festival Amsterdam (IDFA), the International Film Festival and Form on Human Rights (FIFDH Geneva), New York African Film Festival, Jean Rouch International Film Festival, Paris; Etats généraux du film documentaire in Lussas, Afrika Film Festival, Cologne; Festival of African Cinema (FCAT), Biografilms in Bologna, Open City Documentary Festival in London, Columbia University, Maison Française Film Festival, among others.

Kassanda's first work, Trouble Sleep, received the Golden Dove for Best Short Film at the DOK Leipzig international festival for documentary and animated film in 2020 and the jury's special mention at the Cinéma du Réel. The film was screened at the Urban Planning Film Series at Massachusetts Institute of Technology in October 2022.

At the FIFDH Geneva 2023, Kassanda's second work and debut full-length film, Colette and Justin (2022), which recalls his grandparents’ experience of Belgian colonialism and the nationalist struggles for Congolese independence, won the Gilda Vieira De Mello Award in the Creative Documentary Competition. The film premiered at the IDFA, and was nominated for the IDFA Award for Best First Feature and the Beeld en Geluid IDFA ReFrame Award. The film also got the jury's special mention at the Biografilms. In September 2023, Colette & Justin was announced as winner of the 2023 African Studies Association Film Prize, and will be screened at the association's annual conference.

Kassanda's latest work, Coconut Head Generation (2023), was selected for the New Directors/New Films at Lincoln Center and Museum of Modern Art. At the 2023 Cinéma du Réel, the film won the Grand Prize and Special Mention for the Clarens Prize for Humanist Documentary Filmmaking.
