= If Only I Could Hibernate =

- Theatrical release poster
- Directed by: Zoljargal Purevdash
- Written by: Zoljargal Purevdash
- Produced by: Zoljargal Purevdash; Frederic Corvez; Maeva Savinien
- Starring: Battsooj Uurtsaikh; Nominjiguur Tsend; Tuguldur Batsaikhan
- Distributed by: Urban Factory
- Release date: 21 May 2023 (Cannes)
- Running time: 96 minutes
- Countries: Mongolia; France; Switzerland; Qatar
- Language: Mongolian

If Only I Could Hibernate (Mongolian: Баавгай болохсон, romanized: Baavgai Bolohson, lit. 'Wish I could turn into a bear') is 2023 drama film written and directed by Zoljargal Purevdash in her directorial debut.

It was the first Mongolian film to play in the Official Selection of the Cannes Film Festival, where it competed in the Un Certain Regard section at the 2023 edition. The film was selected as the Mongolian entry for the Best International Feature Film at the 97th Academy Awards.

== Plot ==
Ulzii (Battsooj Uurtsaikh) is a teenager living with his family in a yurt on the outskirts of Ulaanbaatar in Mongolia. His father is dead and his mother resorts to drinking alcohol instead of finding a job, meaning that there is often not enough coal to heat the home in the cold of winter. Ulzii feels responsible for his three younger siblings and is desperate to earn money. He sells his trainers and helps his older neighbour deliver meat caracasses. Ulzii is successful at school and a teacher (Batzorig Sukhbaatar) encourages him to take part in a physics competition; if he does well, he can win a scholarship. When his mother returns to the countryside with one sibling, Ulzii is left to look after his brother and sister Tungaa (Nominjiguur Tsend) and Erkhemee (Tuguldur Batsaikhan). He has to skip school in order to earn money by illegally logging the forest, which jeopardises his plans to enter the physics competition.

== Cast ==
- Battsooj Uurtsaikh as Ulzii, a 9th grader and the older brother of three.
- Nominjiguur Tsend as Tungaa, the younger sister of Ulzii
- Tuguldur Batsaikhan as Erkhemee, the younger brother of Ulzii
- Ganchimeg Sandagdordorj as mother
- Batmandakh Batchuluun as Garig, the youngest of the three siblings.
- Davaasamba Sharaw as the old neighbour
- Batzorig Sukhbaatar as the physics teacher

== Production ==
If Only I Could Hibernate was written and directed by Zoljargal Purevdash with the Mongolian actor Battsooj Uurtsaikh as the lead actor in the role of Ulzii. It is Purevdash's first feature film; she herself grew up in the yurt district of Ulaanbaatar.

In 2023, If Only I Could Hibernate was the first Mongolian film to play in Official Selection at Cannes Film Festival, at the Un Certain Regard section. It is a co-production between Zoljargal Purevdash's Mongolian production house Amygdala Films and Paris-based Urban Factory, headed by producers Frédéric Corvez and Maeva Savinien.

== Release ==
If Only I Could Hibernate had its world premiere at the 2023 Cannes Film Festival on 21 May 2023, in the Un Certain Regard section and was also screened at the 28th Busan International Film Festival in the 'A Window on Asian Cinema' section in October 2023. It was released in UK and Irish cinemas on 19 April 2024, and the US release date is to be announced.

== Reception ==
=== Critical response ===
Reviewing the film at Cannes, Screen Daily said it was an "assured feature debut" by Purevdash and praised the "charismatic newcomer" Uurtsaikh. Sight and Sound called it "a beautifully crafted Mongolian drama".

=== Accolades ===
Award	Date of ceremony	Category	Recipient(s)	Result	Ref.
Cannes Film Festival	27 May 2023	Un Certain Regard	Zoljargal Purevdash	Nominated	
Tokyo FILMeX	26 November 2023	Special Jury Prize (Shared with Critical Zone)	Zoljargal Purevdash	Won	

== See also ==
- List of submissions to the 97th Academy Awards for Best International Feature Film
- List of Mongolian submissions for the Academy Award for Best International Feature Film
