= The Children of Leningradsky =

2005 film

- Directed by: Andrzej Celiński; Hanna Polak
- Produced by: Sara Bernstein; Andrzej Celinski; Hanna Polak
- Cinematography: Hans Jurgen Burkard; Andrzej Celinski; Hanna Polak; Ewa Romanowska-Rózewicz
- Edited by: Simeon Hutner
- Release date: 2005
- Running time: 34 minutes
- Country: Poland
- Language: Russian

The Children of Leningradsky (Polish: Dzieci z Leningradzkiego) is a 2005 Polish short documentary film about a community of homeless children living in the Leningradsky railway station in Moscow. Directed by Andrzej Celiński and Hanna Polak, it was nominated for an Academy Award for Best Documentary Short.

== Synopsis ==
A text at the beginning of the film states that since the fall of the Soviet Union, between 1 and 4 million Russian children have become homeless and about 30,000 of them live around the Moscow railway stations. The film follows a group of children between the ages of eight and 14 during their daily lives at Leningradsky railway station.

One boy, Misha, says his father didn't accept him as his son so he was brought to an orphanage at age two. Roma, who is 12, stabbed his father twice in the stomach because his parents would get drunk and beat him and a 14-year-old girl, Yula, recalls how she was raped at age eleven but her mother accepted money instead of going to court and took to drugs, after which Yula left home. Sergiozha and his brothers seek shelter on the hot-water pipes in the sewers over the winter while others sleep in the trains or in the station.

Most of the girls and some of the boys take to prostitution to make money for food, clothes and glue. All them are addicted to sniffing glue, they drink vodka during the day and sometimes sleep in rundown empty houses. A policeman beats a young boy and dumps a bottle of glue over his head and face. The children pick fights with homeless adults whom they despise and call bums. They tell that another child was raped and murdered and how the policemen beat them and held them for 48 hours although they had nothing to do with it.

One of the last scenes shows the emotional funeral of a young girl, Tanya, that died from a glue overdose one day before her fourteenth birthday. The film closes with 13-year-old Misha saying "God believes in people and helps them. He loves everyone, even bad people, not just Russians. He even loves Chechnyans. But most of all, He loves children."
