= International Film Festival and Forum on Human Rights =

Annual film festival held in Geneva, Switzerland

International Film Festival and Forum on Human Rights Geneva
- Location: Geneva, Switzerland
- Founded: 2002
- Most recent: 2025
- Awards: Grand Prix, Fiction and Human Rights, World Organization Against Torture, Youth Jury, Gilda Vieira de Mello Prize
- Hosted by: The FIFDH foundation
- Festival date: Annually, in March (during the UN Human Rights Council)
- Website: https://www.fifdh.org/en/

Current: 23rd
- 24th 22nd

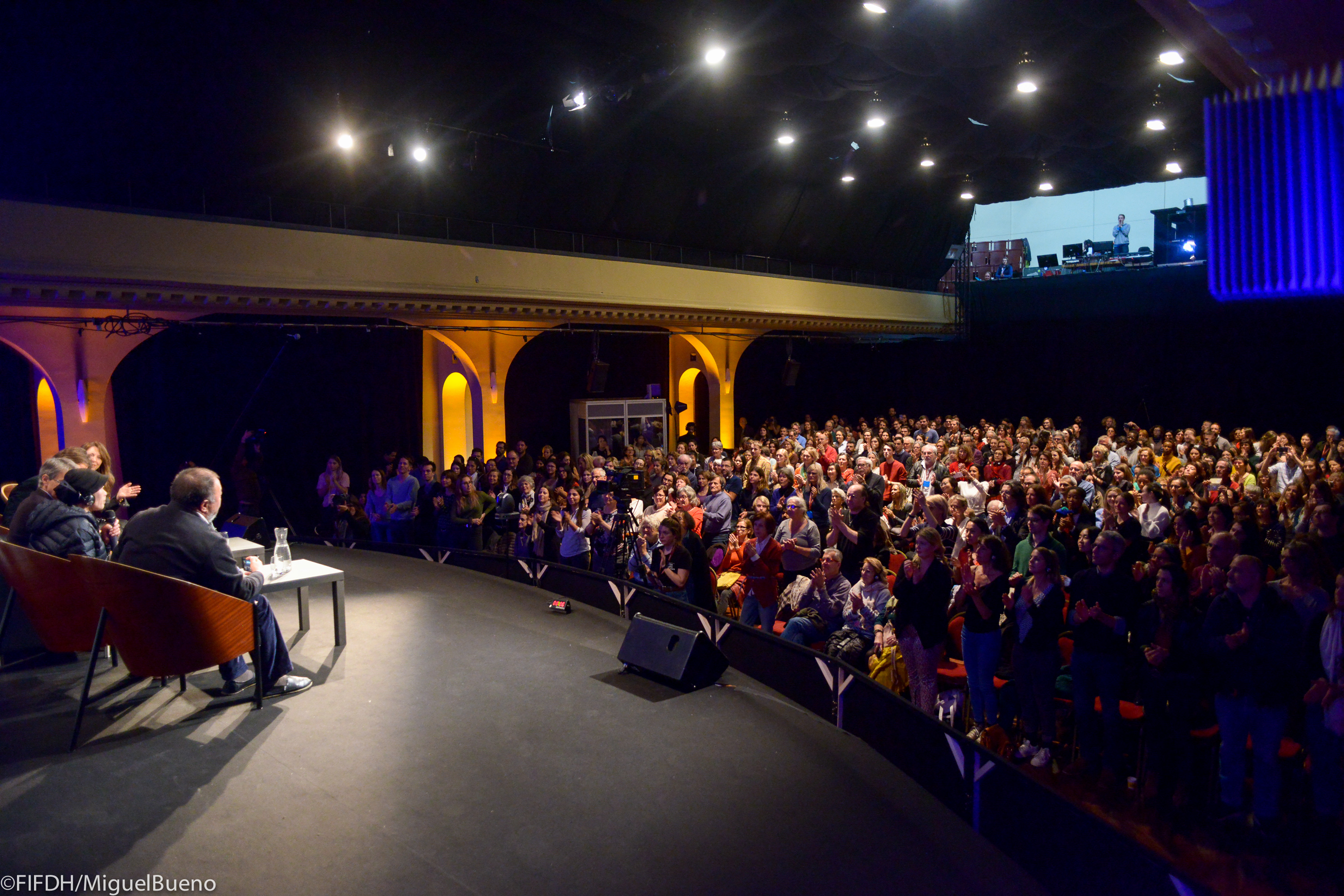
FIFDH, March 2019

The International Film Festival and Forum on Human Rights (FIFDH) an international event dedicated to cinema and human rights, held annually in Geneva. A ten-days long event is based on the concept 'A film, A subject, A debate', following the screenings with discussion in presence of filmmakers and specialists.

== History ==
FIFDH was co-founded by Léo Kaneman, Yäel Reinharz Hazan, Pierre Hazan, and Isabelle Gattiker in November 2002. Its first edition took place in March 2003. Kaneman described FIFDH as a "platform against indifference".

FIFDH is based on the concept 'A film, A subject, A debate'. Films presented at the festival are followed with a discussion on the problems highlighted by the movie, in the presence of filmmakers, human rights defenders, politicians and recognized specialists. Its programme is designed to increase public awareness and inspire people to reinforce their commitment to universal values.

The inspiration behind the International Film Festival and Forum on Human Rights came from human rights defenders active in NGOs, filmmakers, media representatives and the University of Geneva.

The event is supported by the Swiss Federal Government, the State of Geneva, and the City of Geneva.

As a Forum on Human Rights, the Festival informs and firmly denounces violations of civil, political, economic, social and cultural rights wherever they occur. In the heart of Geneva, the 'human rights international capital', the FIFDH is a relay for human rights defenders active on the field. It offers debates as well as unscreened films and solidarity actions. The FIFDH coincides with the UN Human Rights Council's main session. This simultaneous event makes the Festival a Free Platform for discussion and debates on a wide variety of topics concerning human rights, including violence against women, historical revisionism, microcredits, threat of genocide in Sudan's Darfur region, forced disappearances during the 1990s in Algeria, massacres under the Syrian regime, violence in Central American countries, human trafficking in Bangladesh, child soldiers in Yemen, and reproductive rights in the Dominican Republic.

By 2007, the festival attendance reached 16,000. In the same year, FIFDH paid homage to Anna Politkovskaya, murdered in October 2006.

In 2014, Léo Kaneman stepped down and was appointed Honorary President and Advisor.

In 2019, FIFDH launched the industry programme Impact Days. ImpactLab is a professional programme for filmmakers and NGOs that aims to facilitate partnerships between them to multiply the social impact.

As of 2022, the attendance exceeds 40,000. FIFDH's first patron Sérgio Vieira de Mello was killed in Bagdad in 2003. Other patrons of the festival are Barbara Hendricks, Ken Loach, Robert Badinter, Ruth Dreifuss, William Hurt, and Louise Arbour.

== Awards and jury ==
The festival has three competition sections: the Creative Documentary Competition, the Fiction Competition, and the Focus Competition. In the Creative Documentary Competition three main prizes are the Geneva Grand Prix (sponsored by the city of Geneva and valued at CHF 10,000), Gilda Vieira de Mello Prize (CHF 5,000) dedicated to her son, Sergio Vieira de Mello, and the Youth Jury Prize. In the Fiction Competition there are the Fiction Grand Award (ex aequo, valued at CHF 10,000 and provided by the Hélène and Victor Barbour Foundation) and the Youth Jury Prize. In the Focus Competition the list of awards includes the Prize of OMCT, the Artopie Award, Champ-Dollon Men's Jury Prize, Champ-Dollon Women's Jury Prize, and La Brenaz Jury Prize.

== Editions ==
=== 2026 ===
The 24th edition of FIFDH is scheduled for 6—15 March 2026.

=== 2025 ===
The 23rd edition of the Geneva International Film Festival and Forum on Human Rights took place from 7 to 16 March 2025. The 10 days of Festival featured 114 screenings, 71 Forums, Spotlights and events, 3 days of professional programme, with 12 sessions dedicated to schools and 6 awards given in 3 sections in competition. FIFDH Geneva Grand Award went to Les Filles du Nil directed by Nada Riyadh and Ayman El Amir. Gilda Vieira de Mello Award was given to Khartoum by the Sudanese filmmakers Anas Saeed, Rawia Alhag, Ibrahim Snoopy Ahmad, Timeea Mohamed Ahmed, and Phil Cox. Stephen Apkon's There Is Another Way won Vision for Human Rights Award. StoryBoard Impact Award was given to Children of Honey, directed by Tanzanian filmmakers Jigar Ganatra and Immanuel Musa Marco.

=== 2024 ===
The 22nd edition of FIFDH took place between 8 and 17 March and featured 24 forums and 23 events. The line-up included 41 films, while the attendance exceeded 30,000. The panel discussions of the edition regarded the topics of AI rapid expansion, gender apartheid in modern Afghanistan alongside the premiere of the documentary film An Unfinished Journey, and many more. In the Creative Documentary Competition the Geneva Grand Prix was awarded to Name Me Lawand by Edward Lovelace, the Gilda Vieira de Mello Prize went to Life Is Beautiful by Mohamed Jabaly. The Youth Jury Prize was given to Photophobia by Ivan Ostrochovský and Pavol Pekarčik, while the Fiction Grand Prize was awarded to The Cage Is Looking for a Bird by Malika Musaeva. The OMCT prize in the Focus Competition was taken by Jialing Zhang's Total Trust, and the Artopie Award — It's Always Been Me by Julie Bezerra Madsen.

=== 2023 ===
The 21st edition lasted from 10 to 19 March 2023. In the Creative Documentary Competition an international jury of Anna Glogowski, Delphine Kemneloum Djiraibé, Dominique De Rivaz, and Luciano Barisone, gave the Grand Prix to Aurora's Sunrise by Inna Sahakyan. Gilda Vieira de Mello Prize was awarded to Colette and Justin by Alain Kassanda. Steffi Niederzoll's Seven Winters in Tehran received Jury Special Mention, while Vahid Jalilvand's Beyond the Wall won the Fiction Grand Award. The OMCT prize in the Focus competition went to the Etilaat Roz by Abbas Rezaie, and the Artopie Award was given to Becoming a Black Woman by Rachel M'Bon and Juliana Fanjul.

=== 2022 ===
The 20th edition took place on 4–13 March. The program included 36 screenings, 20 debates, 10 exhibitions, as well as several partner events. New audio and video formats were introduced along with VoD. The edition was dedicated to Vietnamese journalist and activist Pham Doan Trang, and Trinidad and Tobago activist Ida Leblanc. The list of premieres included Angels of Sinjar by Hannah Polak and Red Jungle by Juan José Lozano and Zoltán Horváth. A network of podcasts on cinema and human rights was launched. Among the guests of the edition there were American whistleblower Chelsea Manning and abortion rights activist Paxton Smith, WTO director general Ngozi Okonjo-Iweala, Nobel Prize winner Shirin Ebadi.

=== 2021 ===
Grand Prize of Geneva went to Shadow Game by Eefje Blankevoort, Els Van Driel (Netherlands), Gilda Vieira de Mello Prize was given to Downstream to Kinshasa by Dieudo Hamadi (Democratic Republic of the Congo/France/Belgium), Special Mention — Once Upon A Time In Venezuela by Anabel Rodríguez Ríos (Venezuela/UK/Brazil/Austria), Youth Jury Prize — Shadow Game by Eefje Blankevoort, Els Van Driel.

In Fiction Competition the Grand Prize Fiction and Human Rights went to Veins of the World by Byambasuren Davaa (Germany/Mongolia), Special Mention — Should the Wind Drop by Nora Martirosyan (France/Armenia/Belgium), Youth Jury Prize — Veins of the World by Byambasuren Davaa.

In Grand Reportage Competition the Prize of OMCT was given to Coded Bias by Shalini Kantayya (USA/UK/China), Public Award — Dear Future Children by Franz Böhm (Germany/UK), HUG Artopie Jury Prize — Little Girl by Sébastien Lifshitz (France/Denmark).

=== 2018 ===
The OMCT prize went to Cécile Allegra's Anatomy of a crime, a documentary on tortures and sexual abuse in Libya.

=== 2017 ===
The anniversary 15th edition took place on 10–19 March. It featured more than 134 events in 45 locations. Deeyah Khan and Mounir Fatmi chaired the jury for the documentary and fiction sections. The edition, dedicated to Keywan Karimi, also presented his new film Drum in the main competition. Rithy Panh was selected the artist of honour. The panel discussions were dedicated to such subjects as the abuses of the regime of Bashar al-Assad, women's rights and equality. That year, the OMCT prize went to Silent War by Manon Loizeau, a chronicle of human rights abuse in the Syria of Bashar al-Assad.

=== 2016 ===
The edition lasted from 4 to 13 March.

In Creative documentaries competition, the Grand Prix of Geneva went to Among the believers by Hemal Trivedi et Mohammed Ali Naqvi, Prize Gilda Viera De Mello: Hooligan Sparrow by Nanfu Wang, Special Jury Prize, offered by the Barbara Hendricks Foundation for Peace and Reconciliation: A Syrian Love Story by Sean McAllister, Youth Jury Award: Hooligan Sparrow by Nanfu Wang. In Fiction and human rights competition Grand Prix was given to ZVIZDAN (The High Sun) by Dalibor Matanić, Special Mention EXPERIMENTER by Michael Almereyda, Youth Jury Award: “3000 NIGHTS” by Mai Masri.

In OMCT competition, the Grand Prix of the World Organization Against Torture (OMCT) was given to Voyage en Barbarie by Delphine Deloget & Cécile Allegra. Jury Prize of the Centre de Détention de la Clairière — Spartiates by Nicolas Wadimoff.

=== 2015 ===
In Creative documentaries competition, the Grand Prix of Geneva went to On the bride's side (Io sto con la sposa) by Antonio Augugliara, Gabriele del Grande and Khales Saliman Al Nassiry. The Prize Gilda Viera De Mello was given to Spartacus et Cassandra by Ioanis Nuguet. Special mention to The Wanted 18 by Amer Shomali and Paul Cowan. Youth Jury Award: Something Better to Come by Hanna Polak. In Fiction and human rights competition the Grand Prix was given to Charlie's Country by Rolf de Heer. In OMCT competition Grand Prix of the World Organization Against Torture was given to Chechenya, a war without trace by Manon Loizeau.

This edition screened Citizenfour and had Edward Snowden as a guest at a panel discussion following the film.

=== 2014 ===
The 12th edition was held from 7 to 16 March and featured a line-up of 40 films, 28 of them in competition, along with 17 debates and other activities. In 2014, the attendance exceeded 25,000. Among the guests of edition there were Joseph Stiglitz, Robert Badinter, Julian Assange (in remote), Robert Badinter, Alice Nkom.

In the Creative documentaries competition, the Grand Prix of Geneva went to Return to Homs by Talal Derki. Special mention: Sound of Torture by Keren Shayo. Prize Gilda Viera De Mello: Art War by Marco Wilms. Youth Jury Award: 7 Days in Kigali by Mehdi Ba and Jeremy Frey. In Fiction and human rights competition the Grand Prix was given to A Stranger by Croatian director Bobo Jelcic, Youth Jury Award: The Selfish Giant by Clio Barnard.

In OMCT competition, the Grand Prix of the World Organization Against Torture (OMCT) was given to Global Gay, by Frédéric Martel and Rémi Lainé.

=== 2013 ===
The 11th edition took place on 1–10 March. Guest list included Carla Del Ponte, Riccardo Petrella, Navanethem Pillay, Géraldine Savary, Leila Chahid, Colonel Shaul Arieli, and others. The jury was headed by Ai Weiwei.

== See also ==
- Human Rights Watch Film Festival
