= Byambasuren Davaa =

Mongolian filmmaker (born 1971)

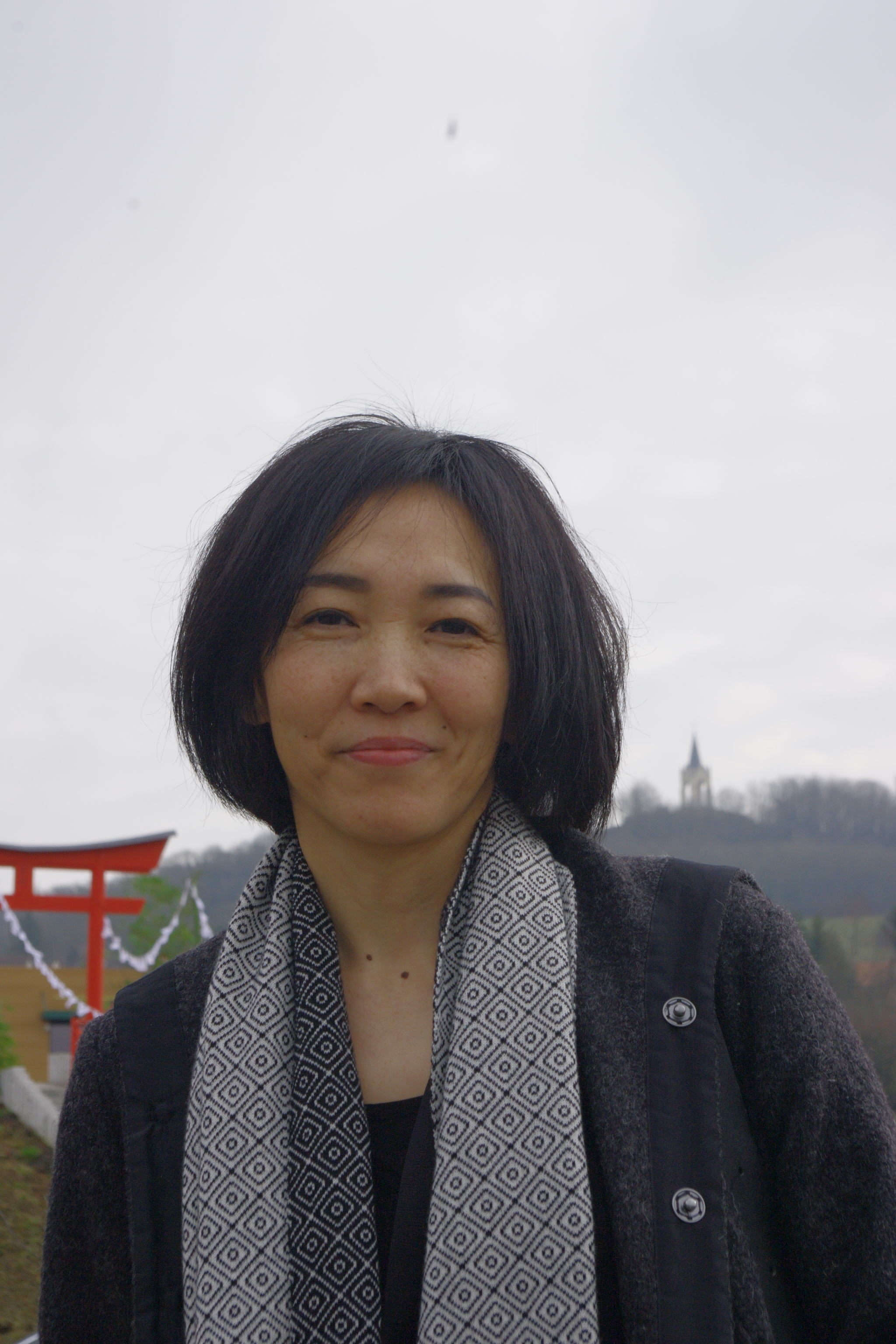
- Byambasuren Davaa in 2017.
- Born: Davaagiin Byambasüren (Mongolian: Даваагийн Бямбасүрэн); 1971 (age 54–55); Ulaanbaatar, Mongolia
- Occupations: Film director; screenwriter
- Years active: 1999–present

Byambasuren Davaa, also known as Davaagiin Byambasüren (Mongolian: Даваагийн Бямбасүрэн; born 1971 in Ulaanbaatar), is a Mongolian filmmaker currently residing in Germany.

Between 1995 and 1998, she studied at the Movie Academy in Ulaanbaatar. In 1998, she began to work as a moderator and director's assistant with Mongolian National Television. In 2000, she moved to Munich, Germany, to study documentary film and communication sciences at the University of Television and Film Munich.

In 2003, Davaa wrote and directed The Story of the Weeping Camel (2003), which gained several awards and nominations, including Best Documentary Film at the Bavarian Film Awards, Best Documentary at the 57th Directors Guild of America Awards, and a nomination for Best Documentary at the 77th Academy Awards. Her other films include The Cave of the Yellow Dog (2006), for which she won the 2006 German Film Award for Best Children's Film, and Veins of the World (2020).

Her films through 2006 tell stories embedded in the traditional life of the nomads in Mongolia. The subjects of her movies also serve as amateur actors, playing mostly themselves, which positions her work somewhere between documentary and fiction.

== Early life ==
Davaa was born in Mongolia in 1971. She studied international law in Mongolia's capital Ulaanbaatar and then moved to Germany, to study documentary film direction. Regarding the reason of her move to Germany, Davaa has stated: "I wanted to learn how to tell stories. Stories that move people of different cultures that are meaningful and universal. For me, the step out of Mongolia, out of my nomadic-family based culture, was also the yearning to learn to understand and relate to the larger context in the world."

She studied documentary filming at the University of Television and Film in Munich, Germany. Before moving to Munich, she worked as a television presenter and assistant director for a Mongolian television channel.

== Career ==
In 2003, she wrote and directed The Story of the Weeping Camel, which won several awards, including the Bavarian Film Awards for Best Documentary, the Directors Guild of America Award for Best Documentary and the San Francisco International Film Festival International Film Critics Award. The film was also nominated for Best Documentary at the 77th Academy Awards. The movie was extremely well received and sold in more than 60 territories, grossing over 9 million dollars. The Story of the Weeping Camel was cited by Rotten Tomatoes as one of the 165 best films directed by women in the 21st century.

In 2005, she wrote and directed The Cave of the Yellow Dog, for which she was also acclaimed. It was Davaa's second feature. The film focuses on a family of nomads living in the Altai, northwestern Mongolia, and the impact a stray dog has on them. The "actors" in the film are a real family of nomads, and the movie has been described as a "quasi-documentary." As other movies by Davaa, it depicts everyday moments for the nomadic Mongolians, using real nomadic Mongolians as actors, and thus in the movie there is "a crunch of authenticity when Mother cuts a block of cheese, milks the goat or sits at her sewing machine to make a school outfit for Nansal; when the father skins a pair of sheep, hoists the skins onto his motorcycle and drives off to sell them in the nearest town." The Cave of the Yellow Dog won the Best Children's Film Award at the 2006 German Film Award.

In 2020, she wrote and directed the drama thriller film Veins of the World, which had its world premiere at the 70th Berlin International Film Festival on February 23, 2020. The movie tells about a 11-year-old Mongolian boy living the traditional life as nomad with his family in the Mongolian steppe, whose peaceful life is "threatened by the encroachment of international mining companies, digging for gold and devastating the natural habitat." The boy's father opposes the encroachers, and after his death the boy carries on the fight. The movie was picked by Mongolia as its official entry for the 93rd Academy Awards in the category Best International Feature Film. After directing documentaries The Story of the Weeping Camel, The Cave of the Yellow Dog and Two Horses of Genghis Khan, Veins of the World was Dava's feature film debut.

== Filmography ==
=== Feature films ===
Year	Film	Director	Writer	Producer
1999	The Orange Horse	Yes	Yes	No
2003	The Story of the Weeping Camel	Yes	Yes	No
2005	The Cave of the Yellow Dog	Yes	Yes	Yes
2009	Two Horses of Genghis Khan	Yes	Yes	Yes
2020	Veins of the World	Yes	Yes	No

== Awards ==
Year	Award	Category	Project	Result	Ref.
2003	Bavarian Film Awards	Best Documentary Film	The Story of the Weeping Camel	Won	
2004	Directors Guild of America Award	Best Documentary	The Story of the Weeping Camel	Won	
2004	Academy Awards	Best Documentary	The Story of the Weeping Camel	Nominated	
2006	German Film Award	Best Children's Film	The Cave of the Yellow Dog	Won	
2004	San Francisco International Film Festival	International Film Critics Award	The Story of the Weeping Camel	Won	
2006	Sahara International Film Festival	White Camel Award	The Story of the Weeping Camel	Won	
2021	International Film Festival and Forum on Human Rights	Grand Prize Fiction and Human Rights	The Story of the Weeping Camel	Won	
