= The Story of the Weeping Camel =

2003 docudrama film by Byambasuren Davaa and Luigi Falorni

The Story of the Weeping Camel Ингэн нулимс
- Directed by: Byambasuren Davaa; Luigi Falorni
- Written by: Byambasuren Davaa; Luigi Falorni
- Produced by: Tobias Siebert
- Starring: Janchiv Ayurzana; Chimed Ohin
- Cinematography: Luigi Falorni
- Edited by: Anja Pohl
- Music by: Marcel Leniz; Marc Riedinger; Choigiw Sangidorj
- Production company: Mongolkina
- Distributed by: Prokino Filmverleih (Germany)
- Release dates: 6 September 2003 (Toronto); 8 January 2004 (Germany)
- Running time: 87 minutes
- Countries: Germany; Mongolia
- Language: Mongolian
- Box office: $9,328,652

The Story of the Weeping Camel (Mongolian: Ингэн нулимс, Ingen nulims, "Tears of the Camel") is a 2003 Mongolian-language docudrama film distributed by ThinkFilm. It was released internationally in 2004. The film was directed and written by Byambasuren Davaa and Luigi Falorni. The plot is about a family of nomadic shepherds in the Gobi Desert trying to save the life of a rare white bactrian camel (Camelus bactrianus) calf after it was rejected by its mother.

== Plot ==
During spring, a family of nomadic shepherds assists the births of their camel herd. The last camel to calve this season has a protracted labor that persists for two days. With the assistance and intervention of the family, a rare white calf is born. This is the mother camel's first calving. Despite the efforts of the shepherds, the mother rejects the newborn, refusing it her milk and failing to establish a care-bond with it.

To restore harmony between the mother and calf, the nomadic family call upon the services of a group of lamas who perform a ritual with bread or dough 'effigies' (Standard Tibetan: torma) of the mother, the calf and the individual members of the family. The rite opens with the sound of a sacred horn followed by bells in the hands of lamas, some of whom wield vajra. The rite takes place with members of the extended nomadic community and a number of lama at a sacred place that consists of one end of a log, or wooden pole, set in the earth, with the other end raised to the sky: a stylized 'victory banner' (Sanskrit: Dhvaja) with a piece of blue fabric entwined around it, functioning as a prayer flag (darchor-style). The log is supported by a cairn of rocks at its base as foundation. The ritual, however, does not re-establish harmony between the mother and calf.

The family then resolves to secure the services of an indigenous 'violinist' to play the music for a Mongolian 'hoos' (Note: Hoos, sometime khoos, khööslökh, etc. - The Mongolian inge khööslökh is a coaxing ritual for camels, now inscribed in the UNESCO Heritage List) ritual. They send their two young boys on a journey through the desert to the district center to locate a musician. The 'violinist' — who actually plays a morin khuur — is summoned to the camp and a ritual of folk music and chanting is enacted. The musician first drapes the morin khuur on the first hump of the camel to establish a sympathetic magical linkage between the mother and the state of harmony represented by the instrument. Once this is done he removes the instrument and commences playing. As the musician sounds the morin khuur, the female family member who lulled her child to sleep with a lullaby earlier in the documentary repeatedly intones the calming sounds and beautiful melody of the 'hoos'. At this point, the mother camel starts to weep, tears visibly streaming from her eyes. Immediately after the rite the mother and calf are reconciled and the calf draws milk from her teat.

== Reception ==
The Story of the Weeping Camel received generally positive reviews; on Rotten Tomatoes, the film holds a 94% 'fresh' rating, based on 103 reviews, and an average rating of 7.57/10, with the consensus "Delightful and strangely moving"; on Metacritic, which uses an average of all 30 critics' reviews, the film has an 81/100, indicating "universal acclaim".

== Honours and awards ==
The documentary was nominated for an Oscar in the category Best Documentary at the 77th Academy Awards.

- International Film Critics Award, 2004 San Francisco International Film Festival
- White Camel Award, 2006 Sahara International Film Festival
