= Mons International Film Festival =

The Mons International Film Festival (French: Festival international du film d'amour de Mons, FIFA) is an annual film festival held in Mons, Belgium. It was launched in 1984 by Elio Di Rupo and has been held every year in February. The film voted by a jury as the best in the competition section receives the Grand Prize.
