= Genghis (disambiguation) =

Genghis Khan was the founder of the Mongol Empire.

Genghis may also refer to:

== Books ==
The Conqueror series of novels by Conn Iggulden:

- Genghis: Birth of an Empire
- Genghis: Lords of the Bow
- Genghis: Bones of the Hills
- Genghis: Empire of Silver

== Locations ==
- Genghis Hills, topographical elevations in the Shackleton Range, Antarctica
- Genghis Grill, an American restaurant chain

== Music ==
- Genghis Barbie, a horn quartet from New York
- Genghis Tron, a four-piece experimental metal band from New York
- Genghis Danger, an extended play by British music producer Rusko
- Genghis Blues, a 1999 American documentary film about Paul Pena

== Other uses ==
- Genghis (robot), a six legged insect-like robot from the 1970s
- Genghis John, nickname of US Air Force fighter pilot John Boyd
- Genghis Bond Agent 1-2-3, a 1965 film.

== See also ==
- Genghis Khan in popular culture
- Chinggis (disambiguation), Mongolian form
- Dschinghis Khan (disambiguation), German form
- Cengiz, Turkish form
- Changezi, Urdu/Hindi form
- Changizi (disambiguation), Persian form
- Temujin (disambiguation)
- Genghisids, Asian dynasties descended from Genghis Khan
