= Genghis Khan in popular culture =

Notable depictions of Mongol leader

There have been numerous works of literature, films and other works based on the Mongolian ruler Genghis Khan and his legacy. Products and places are often named after him, a trend that has attracted some concern.

== Literature ==
- "Genghis Khan with a telegraph" is a Russian idiom which means the use of technological progress to strengthen despotism. It was first used by Alexander Herzen in 1857 and then widely used until the 1970s, sometimes modified with doomsday weaponry: "Genghis Khan with nuclear bomb", "with hydrogen bomb", "with [ballistic] rockets". Compare "Upper Volta with rockets", in reference to the Soviet Union.
- "The Squire's Tale", one of The Canterbury Tales by Geoffrey Chaucer, is set at the court of Genghis Khan.
- Zingis, a 1768 tragedy by the British writer Alexander Dow set during the reign of Tamerlane.
- Mongol Invasion, a 1939 epic trilogy by Vasily Yan and winner of a USSR state prize in 1942.
- 'The End of Genghis', a 1953 poem by F. L. Lucas, in which the dying Khan, attended by his Khitan counsellor Yelü Chucai, looks back on his life.
- The Legend of the Condor Heroes, a 1957 Chinese wuxia novel by Jin Yong
- "The Private Life of Genghis Khan", a short story based on the 1975 TV show pilot Out of the Trees by Douglas Adams and Graham Chapman.
- White Cloud of Genghis Khan, a novella originally published together with the 1980 novel The Day Lasts More Than a Hundred Years by Chingiz Aitmatov
- Genghis Khan and the Making of the Modern World, a popular 2004 history book by Jack Weatherford
- The Conqueror, a series of historical fiction novels by Conn Iggulden published 2007-2011.

== Films ==
- The Mask of Fu Manchu, a 1932 American film directed by Charles Brabin
- Genghis Khan, a 1950 Philippine film directed by Manuel Conde.
- The Conqueror, a 1956 American epic historical drama film starring John Wayne as Temüjin and Susan Hayward as Börte.
- Changez Khan, a 1957 Indian Hindi-language film directed by Kedar Kapoor, starring Sheikh Mukhtar as the emperor along with Bina Rai and Prem Nath in the lead roles.
- Changez Khan, a 1958 Pakistani historical film directed by Rafiq Sarhadi. It was based on Naseem Hijazi's novel Akhari Chattan.
- Genghis Khan, a 1965 American film starring Omar Sharif.
- Genghis Khan, a 1998 Chinese film directed by Sai Fu and Mai Lisi.
- Genghis Khan: To the Ends of the Earth and Sea, also known as The Descendant of Gray Wolf, a 2007 Japanese-Mongolian film directed by Shinichiro Sawai.
- Mongol, a 2007 Russian-German-Kazakh film directed by Sergei Bodrov, starring Tadanobu Asano as Temüjin and Chuluuny Khulan as Börte. It was nominated for the Academy Award for Best International Feature Film at the 80th Academy Awards.
- No Right to Die – Chinggis Khaan, a 2008 Mongolian film.
- By the Will of Chingis Khan, a 2009 Russian film.
- Genghis Khan, a 2018 Chinese historical fantasy epic film.
- It is implied in the 2021 film Shang-Chi and the Legend of the Ten Rings that Wenwu is Genghis Khan himself.

== Television series ==
- Genghis Khan, a 1987 Hong Kong television series produced by TVB, starring Alex Man.
- Genghis Khan, a 1987 Hong Kong television series produced by ATV, starring Tony Liu.
- Genghis Khan, a 2004 Chinese-Mongolian co-produced television series, starring Batdorj-in Baasanjab, a descendant of Genghis Khan's second son Chagatai.
- Genghis Khan, a 2005 BBC documentary.

== Music ==
- "Dschinghis Khan", a 1979 disco song by a band of the same name.
- "The Great Chinggis Khaan", a 2019 folk metal song by The Hu.
- "Genghis Khan", song by Swedish indie-pop band Miike Snow
- "Hordes of Khan", a 2025 song by Swedish powermetal band Sabaton (band) from their album "Legends (Sabaton album)"

== Video games ==
- Genghis Khan, a Genghis Khan-themed Japanese game series from 1987.
- Temüjin (video game), a 1997 computer game.
- Genghis Khan (video game), Genghis Khan-themed Japanese game series.
- Genghis Khan is a frequently used leader representing the Mongols in the Civilization series.
- Age of Empires II, a 1999 real-time strategy video game features a Mongol conquests campaign with Genghis Khan as a playable character.

== Descendants ==
- In The Hitchhiker's Guide to the Galaxy, the motorway contractor Mr Prosser is (unknown to himself) a direct patrilineal descendant of Genghis Khan. This manifests itself in a predilection for fur hats, a desire to have axes hanging above his front door, being slightly overweight and occasional visions of screaming Mongol hordes.
- Shiwan Khan, described as the last living descendant of Genghis appears as an antagonist in The Shadow, a collection of serialized dramas originally on 1930s radio, and the 1994 film adaptation The Shadow.
- Marvel Comics supervillains the Mandarin and his son Temugin, both primarily opponents of Iron Man, are descendants of Genghis Khan.
- In the popular video game Ghost of Tsushima, the main antagonist Khotun Khan is said to be the grandson of Genghis Khan.

== Food and drinks ==
- Jingisukan, a Japanese dish of grilled mutton, named after the emperor
- Chinggis (vodka), a Mongolian vodka brand

== Placenames ==
- Chinggis Khaan International Airport, main international airport of Ulaanbaatar
- Chinggis, capital of Khentii, Mongolia, formerly known as Öndörkhaan (lit. 'High khagan')
- Chinggis Square, former name of Sükhbaatar Square
- Chinggis Khaan National Museum, museum in Ulaanbaatar

== Other ==
- Chinggis Fund, Mongolian sovereign wealth fund

== Personal names ==
- Cengiz – the Turkish form; includes list of people with this name
- Changezi – the Urdu and Hindi form; includes list of people with this name
- Changizi – the Persian form; includes list of people with this name
- Temujin – personal name of Genghis Khan

== See also ==
- Chinggis (disambiguation) – transliteration of the traditional Mongolian spelling of Genghis; lists people and places with this as part of their name
- Dschinghis Khan (disambiguation) – the German form of Genghis Khan
