= Genghis Khan (disambiguation) =

Genghis Khan (c. 1162–1227), also known as Chinggis Khan, was the founder and ruler of the Mongol Empire.

Genghis Khan may also refer to:

== Film and television ==
- Genghis Khan (1950 film), a Filipino film starring Manuel Conde, Ric Bustamante
- Genghis Khan (1965 film), a British film starring Omar Sharif
- Genghis Khan (1998 film), a Chinese film
- Genghis Khan: To the Ends of the Earth and Sea, a 2007 Japanese film
- Genghis Khan (2018 film), a Chinese film
- Genghis Khan (TVB TV series), a 1987 Hong Kong television series
- Genghis Khan (ATV TV series), a 1987 Hong Kong television series
- Genghis Khan (2004 TV series), a 2004 Chinese-Mongolian television series
- Genghis Khan (documentary), a 2005 British television documentary

== Music ==
- "Genghis Khan" (Miike Snow song)
- "Genghis Khan" (Jedi Mind Tricks song)
- "Genghis Khan", a song by Ace Frehley from the album Anomaly
- "Genghis Khan", a song by Cavalera Conspiracy from the album Blunt Force Trauma
- "Genghis Khan", a song by Iron Maiden from the album Killers
- "Genghis Khan", a song by Iron Mask from the album Black as Death
- "Genghis Khan", a song by Running Wild from the album Gates to Purgatory
- "Genghis Khan", a song by Warkings from the album Armageddon
- "Genghis Khan", a song by Stanley Huang
- Dschinghis Khan, German eurodance group
  Dschinghis Khan (song), a song by said group

== Other uses ==
- Aoki Ōkami to Shiroki Mejika, a video game series, also known as Genghis Khan in Western countries
- Genghis Khan (video game), a 1987 strategy game
- Genghis Khan: The Emperor of All Men, a book by Harold Lamb
- Jingisukan, a Japanese grilled mutton dish whose name is a transliteration of Genghis Khan
- Operation Chengiz Khan, Pakistan Air Force operation during the Indo-Pakistani War of 1971

== See also ==
- Genghis (disambiguation)
- Genghis Khan in popular culture
- Cengiz, Turkish form of Genghis; includes list of people with this as a surname
- Changezi, Urdu and Hindi form; includes list of people with this surname
- Changizi (disambiguation), Persian form; includes list of people with this surname
- Chinggis (disambiguation), Mongolian form of Genghis; lists people and places associated with this name
- Dschinghis Khan (disambiguation), German form of Genghis Khan
