= Chinggis (disambiguation) =

Chinggis is a transliteration of the traditional Mongolian spelling of Genghis Khan, founder of the Mongol Empire.

From Cyrillic orthography, it may be transcribed as Chingis. It may also refer to:

== Place names ==
- Chinggis City, new name of the city of Öndörkhaan, Mongolia
- Chinggis Square, name for Sükhbaatar Square between 2013–2016, Ulaanbaatar, Mongolia
- Chingis (village), village in Ordynsky District, Novosibirsk Oblast, Russia
- Chingis (river), river in Novosibirsk Oblast, Russia

== Other ==
- Chingiz, given name
- Cengiz, given name
- Chinggis (vodka), an alcohol brand from Mongolia
- Chengiz (film), 2023 Indian Bengali-language action thriller film

== See also ==
- Genghis (disambiguation)
- Genghis Khan (disambiguation)
- Changizi (disambiguation)
- Temujin (disambiguation)
- Chinggisids, Asian dynasties descended from Genghis Khan
- Gubaydulla Chingiskhan (1840–1909), Kazakh prince and General of the Cavalry of the Russian Empire.
