= The Dangerous Book for Boys =

2006 guidebook by Conn and Hal Iggulden

- Author: Conn Iggulden and Hal Iggulden
- Illustrator: Richard Horne
- Cover artist: William Webb
- Language: English
- Subject: Hobbies, Quizzes and Games
- Genre: Non-fiction
- Publisher: HarperCollins
- Publication date: June 2006 (UK); May 2007 (US)
- Publication place: United Kingdom; United States
- Media type: Print Hardback
- Pages: 294 pp
- ISBN: 0-00-723274-8 (UK); 0-06-124358-2 (US)
- OCLC: 64311208
- LC Class: AG106 .I38 2006

The Dangerous Book for Boys, by Conn and Hal Iggulden is a guidebook published by HarperCollins, aimed at boys "from eight to eighty." It covers around eighty topics, including how to build a treehouse, grow a crystal, or tell direction with a watch. Also included are famous quotes, stories, historical battles, and phrases that "every boy should know." It was published in the UK in June 2006, and reached number one in the UK non-fiction charts several times, selling over half a million copies.

Conn Iggulden also published a novel entitled Wolf of the Plains about Genghis Khan, which, along with The Dangerous Book for Boys, allowed Iggulden to become the first author to reach the number one spot in both the fiction and non-fiction charts.

Within the first week of its US publication on 1 May 2007, it reached number two on the Amazon best-selling book lists, being outsold only by Harry Potter and the Deathly Hallows. Other people who contributed to the success of the book include the editorial team, which consisted of Katie Espiner and Clare Hey, as well as Helen Johnstone, who won the 2007 British Book Industry Award for best publicity campaign.

== Reception ==
Some reviewers have criticised the book for encouraging its young readers to partake in activities that could result in injury, although there is a liability warning below the copyright information. Some observers also objected to what was perceived as promoting gendered stereotypes. Others have praised the book for helping inspire outdoor activities and adventures to counter "PlayStation Culture" where youngsters devote free time to indoor video games.

== Awards and nominations ==
- 2007: Book of the Year award at the 2007 Galaxy British Book Awards, the Nibbies,

The book has also won various industry awards including the Stora Enso Design and Production Award at the British Book Industry Awards for the design and production team of Andrew Ashton and Nicole Abel.

== Editions ==
The original edition of this book has a cover based on the 1885 cover for the Boy's Own Annual, the yearly compendium of the popular magazine, Boy's Own Paper.

In June 2007, the Pocket Dangerous Book for Boys: Things to Do was published in the UK by HarperCollins. A small green book, it takes activities from the larger Dangerous Book for Boys and makes them available in a portable format. Dangerous Book for Boys Yearbook came out in September 2007 in the UK, and has historical facts, seasonal activities and space to note your own adventures and with a blue cover with gold lettering. In June 2008, the Pocket Dangerous Book for Boys: Things to Know was released. US editions of these three came out in summer/fall of 2008. Canadian edition of the book was released in October 2008.

Also in 2007, an Australian edition of the book was published. It features Australian content such as Prime Ministers of Australia with pictures for each in color and the rules of Australian rules football. Brazil also published its own version also including national content, including a chapter on Monteiro Lobato instead of Shakespeare. There is also a Portuguese edition.

A sequel targeted at girls, The Daring Book for Girls, was published in late October 2007. It was written by Andrea J. Buchanan and Miriam Peskowitz.

The Dangerous Book for Boys partnered with science kit publisher Thames & Kosmos, who released two kits licensed under The Dangerous Book for Boys in autumn of 2009.

== Television adaptation ==
In August 2007 it was reported that Disney would begin the production of a movie based on the book, but that project never got off the ground.

Bryan Cranston's production company Moon Shot Entertainment optioned the rights in 2014, and sold the project to NBC later that year.

In 2017, the project was picked up by Amazon for a six-episode order scheduled to begin production in New York City that summer. The series premiered on Amazon Prime on 30 March 2018.
