= Incanti Theatre Festival (Turin) =

Incanti is a yearly theatre festival held in Torino, Italy, since 1994. Amongst the main patrons are the Italian Ministry of Cultural Heritage, the Piemonte Region, the Municipality of Torino, and the foundations Compagnia di San Paolo and Fondazione CRT. The festival was created in 1994 by the cultural association Controluce Teatro d’Ombre as an experiment hosted in the small theatre at the Castello di Rivoli museum of contemporary art; it bore the name Incanti, International Festival of Figure Theatre. Starting from 2002, the press acknowledged how Incanti, “from a refined niche festival, a precious gem for a selected audience, has converted to one among the most reputed figure-theatre shows across Europe,” addressing mainly an adult audience and featuring a programme that includes both tradition and experimentation, where multi-media shows highlighting the links between performance, music, visual arts and poetry play a key role.

== Patronage ==
In the beginning, Incanti relied solely on the patronage of the Piemonte Region and the cooperation of the Castello di Rivoli museum of contemporary art. In time, the following patrons have joined in: the Compagnia di San Paolo and the Fondazione CRT foundations, the Municipality of Torino through Sistema Teatro Torino, the Municipality of Grugliasco, the foundation Teatro Stabile di Torino, and the national Ministry for Cultural Heritage.

== Partnerships ==
Incanti cooperates on a regular basis with: Torino’s Fondazione Teatro Ragazzi e Giovani foundation, the National Museum of Cinema, the Institute for Puppetry and Popular Theatre. Partnerships with other Italian and foreign festivals were established in the past editions, as well as with such institutions as Aiace Torino (the Italian Association of Independent Cinema Fans), ASIFA, the Goethe-Institut at Torino, the Austrian Cultural Forum, the Japanese Institute for Culture at Rome, the Ramon LLull Institute of Barcelona, Wallonie-Brussels International, MAO (Museum of Oriental Arts Torino), Torino’s Diffuse Museum of the Resistance, the Deportation, the War, the Rights and Freedom, the Regional Museum of Natural History at Torino, the Peoples’ Festival of Florence.

== Guest Artists and Companies ==
Incanti hosts artists and companies from all over Europe, as well as from Asia, the Americas and Australia. Both tradition (Prasanna Rao, Kerala Kathakali Center, Cengiz Özek, Richard Bradshaw) and contemporary research (Stephen Mottram, Dondoro Theatre, Max Vandervorst, Gyula Molnar, Compagnie Gare Centrale, Duda Paiva, Nori Sawa) have been represented. Italian companies clearly participate as well, from eclectic surrealism (such as Guido Ceronetti’s Teatro dei Sensibili) to latest avant-garde.

== Teaching Projects and Productions ==
PIP (Project Incanti Produces). From 2008, a group of figure-theatre students and professionals selected through an international competition, create every year a new play to be staged at the festival (board and lodging covered by Incanti). Internationally renowned figures have directed the plays: Eva Kaufmann (2008), Neville Tranter (2009), Frank Soehnle (2010), Gyula Molnar (2011), Andrew and Kathy Kim (2012), Duda Paiva (2013), Max Vandervorst (2014), Nori Sawa (2015), Agnès Limbos (2016). Anna Ivanova-Brashinskaya will be entrusted with the 2017 edition.

Shadow-Theatre Workshop. Jointly with the educational department of the Castello di Rivoli museum of contemporary art, every year Incanti sets up a brief workshop where famous international professionals participate.

== Schools and Families ==
Branch activities address schools and are developed in cooperation with the Municipality of Grugliasco at the Chalet Allemand in Le Serre Cultural Park. Shows for families are yearly staged at Torino’s Casa del Teatro in cooperation with the Fondazione Teatro Ragazzi e Giovani foundation.
