= Özek =

Özek is a Turkish surname. Notable people with the surname include:

- Cengiz Özek (born 1964), Turkish shadow theatre manipulator
- Çetin Özek (1934–2008), Turkish professor, jurist, author, and journalist
