= FC Dynamo Bryansk =

Russian football club

Dynamo-Bryansk
- Full name: Football Club; Dynamo-Bryansk
- Nicknames: Blue-and-white, Partizany (Guerrillas), Dinamiki, Brianskie volki (Bryansk wolves)
- Founded: 1931; 95 years ago
- Ground: Dynamo Stadium, Bryansk
- Capacity: 10,100
- Owner: Bryansk / Bryansk Oblast
- Executive director: Aleksandr Misnik
- Manager: Andrei Kanchelskis
- League: Russian Second League, Division A, Gold Group
- 2025–26: Second stage: Silver Group, 1st
- Website: www.fc-db.ru
| Home colours | Away colours |

FC Dynamo-Bryansk is a Russian football club based in Bryansk.

The team colours are (Home) all blue. (Away) all white with blue shorts.

== History ==
The club was founded in 1931 by GPU officer Filaret Adamovich. The team initially consisted of players from Baku and Smolensk and played in the Western Oblast league. Dynamo was among the leading teams of the region until 1936, when Bryansk became part of Oryol Oblast and Adamovich left the city.

After World War II Dynamo returned to leading roles, now in the newly formed Bryansk Oblast. In 1949 and 1952 the club played in the RSFSR league, and in 1959 they won the Bryansk Oblast championship.

The success of 1959 allowed Dynamo to enter the national Class B in 1960. In 1967, they finished first in their zone and qualified for the semi-finals, where they were fifth. In 1968 Dynamo were first in the zone again, but also managed to finish first in the semi-finals and fourth in the finals, securing promotion to Class A, Second Group. Dynamo managed to stay at that level for two years, being relegated in 1970. In 1971–1991 they played in the Soviet Second League, their highest achievement being the league championship in 1989.

After the dissolution of USSR Dynamo played in the Russian Second League in 1992–1993, Third League in 1994–1997 and Second Division in 1998–2003. In 2003 Dynamo finished at the top of the Second Division Centre zone, level on points with FC Oryol. In the championship playoff Oryol won the promotion to the First Division, however, after the exclusion of Dynamo SPb, Dynamo Bryansk were also granted promotion.

In 2006–07 season Dynamo qualified for the semi-finals of Russian Cup, where they were defeated by FC Moscow in 2 matches series (1:1, 0:1).

In 2009, the club came second in its Russian Second Division zone but was not promoted. However, in early 2010, FC Moscow dropped out from the Russian Premier League for financial reasons, FC Alania Vladikavkaz were promoted from the First Division to the Premier League, and Dynamo Bryansk took Alania's spot in the Russian First Division, where they played in 2010.

At the end of the 2010 season, Dynamo officially changed their mascot to the Bryansk wolf.

In 2012 the club had lost its professional status and left First division. It was promoted to the third-tier professional level (now called Russian Professional Football League) for the 2013–14 season.

On 15 May 2020, the 2019–20 PFL season was abandoned due to COVID-19 pandemic in Russia. As Dynamo was leading in their PFL zone at the time, they were promoted to the second-tier FNL for the 2020–21 season.

On 30 August 2020, in a FNL game against FC Irtysh Omsk three players who tested positive for COVID-19 played, with the club submitting faked negative test results to the league. As a consequence, head coach Aleksandr Gorbachyov was banned from football for a year, and team director Valeri Korneyev was banned for life, the club was also docked 3 points. Dynamo finished the 2020–21 season in the FNL relegation zone.

== Current squad ==
As of 29 July 2026, according to the Second League website.

Note: Flags indicate national team as defined under FIFA eligibility rules; some limited exceptions apply. Players may hold more than one non-FIFA nationality.

| No. | Pos. | Nation | Player |
|---|---|---|---|
| 1 | GK | RUS | Timur Akmurzin |
| 2 | DF | RUS | Richard Golovachyov |
| 3 | DF | RUS | Nikita Mankov |
| 4 | DF | RUS | Denis Osokin |
| 5 | DF | RUS | Roman Samsonenko |
| 6 | DF | RUS | Nikolay Alyokhin |
| 8 | MF | RUS | Yegor Teterlev |
| 9 | MF | RUS | Ivan Solovyov |
| 10 | MF | RUS | Vladislav Drogunov |
| 11 | FW | RUS | Daniil Konoplyov |
| 12 | MF | RUS | Artyom Medvedev |
| 13 | GK | RUS | Artyom Yermakov |
| 14 | MF | RUS | Lev Alim |
| 15 | MF | RUS | Aleksandr Novikov |
| 16 | GK | RUS | Aleksandr Grishayev |

| No. | Pos. | Nation | Player |
|---|---|---|---|
| 17 | MF | RUS | Kirill Volovich |
| 18 | MF | RUS | Oleg Shalayev |
| 20 | MF | RUS | Dmitri Pikatov |
| 21 | DF | RUS | Ivan Rapakov |
| 22 | DF | RUS | Roman Surmy |
| 23 | DF | RUS | Ivan Maklakov |
| 24 | FW | RUS | Vadim Kondrashov |
| 26 | FW | RUS | Maksim Kovzikov |
| 25 | MF | RUS | Stanislav Topinka (on loan from Sochi) |
| 29 | FW | RUS | Bogdan Tsybrov (on loan from Lokomotiv Moscow) |
| 30 | MF | RUS | Maksim Khalilov |
| 31 | FW | RUS | Ilya Yemelyanov |
| 32 | DF | RUS | Sergey Terekhov |
| 34 | DF | RUS | Maksim Aksyutin |
| 35 | DF | RUS | Ivan Skovpen |

== See also ==
- Dynamo FC

== Notable players ==
Had international caps for their respective countries. Players whose name is listed in bold represented their countries while playing for Dynamo.

Russia/USSR

- (Soviet Union) Viktor Anichkin
- (Russia) Maksim Belyayev
- (Russia) Valeri Chizhov
- (Russia) Sergei Filippenkov
- (Russia) Veniamin Mandrykin
- (Soviet Union) Valery Petrakov
- (Russia) Sergei Terekhov
- (Russia) Anton Zabolotny

Former USSR countries

- (Azerbaijan) **Emin Ağayev**
- (Belarus) **Uladzimir Karytska**
- (Belarus) Maksim Romaschenko
- (Kazakhstan) Almir Mukhutdinov
- (Kazakhstan) Oleg Musin
- (Latvia) Aleksejs Semjonovs
- (Moldova) Alexandru Namașco

Europe

- (Bosnia and Herzegovina) Branislav Krunić
- (Serbia) Đorđe Jokić

Africa

- (Malawi) **Essau Kanyenda**
