= Tambov wolf =

Russian phrase

"Tambov wolf is your comrade" (Russian: Тамбовский волк тебе товарищ) is a Russian language phraseme, a stereotypical response to someone to make it clear that the speaker does not consider the interlocutor to be their close associate (comrade, friend, fellow countryman, relative, etc.), contrary to interlocutor's appeal. A similar term is Bryansk wolf.

== Origins and usage ==
=== Tambov wolf ===
There is no such breed of wolves called Tambov wolf, and the term it used either in the literal meaning of "a wolf from Tambov area" or as an allusion to the discussed phrase.

The phrase was popularized by the 1956 Soviet film The Rumyantsev Case. The dialog in question was as follows: "Well, comrade captain, what can I say? — I am not a comrade to you. Tambov wolf is your comrade!" Alexey Burykin cites much more literary examples of the phrase and its variants.

There are several suggestions about the origin of the phrase. The most credible one is attributed to a Tambov local lore enthusiast И.Овсянников, who alleged that the idiom "Tambov wolf" was used in 19th century in reference to economic migrants who moved to Tambov to work at very low rates, thus lowering wages for all in the region.

An early 20th century usage is associated with the Tambov Rebellion of peasantry against the Bolsheviks. The rebels, led by socialist revolutionary Alexander Antonov, used the form of addressing "comrade", the same as used by the Bolsheviks. And when the interrogated rebels used the word "comrade", the interrogators used to retort "Tambov wolf is your comrade", and this was the alleged reason of the popularity of the expression among various Bolshevik penal functionaries.

In her analysis, Maria V. Akhmetova, without establishing any precedence on origins of these terms, discusses many similar expressions aimed at establishing the distance between the speaker and the interlocutor, all of which include two components: something with negative connotations (devil, dog, bitch, swine, etc.) and an appeal to affinity (comrade, friend, brother, etc.), citing literary references for phrases such as "A devil is your friend, not me", "A bitch is your comrade, you German whore!", etc. There is also a broad class of expressions to convey a refusal to do something, such as "Let devil marry her". Akhmetova also points out that similar expressionjs are in use in other languages, citing from a German text: German: Bruder! Mein theurer Bruder! — Der Teufel ist Dein Bruder (Brother! My dear brother! — The devil is your brother").

In modern times the phrase "Tambov Wolf" has become a cultural brand of Tambov and Tambov Oblast. There are two monuments to Tambov wolf, it was registered as a trademark for various brands, and much souvenirs are sold. There also was a Tambov wolf museum in Tambov (its exposition was burned in 2006 during its visit to Bryansk).

=== Bryansk wolf ===
Alexey Burykin notices that the expression "Bryansk wolf" is significantly less frequent than "Tambov wolf" and in most cases it is limited to citing a couple of popular quotes. He notices that the earliest literary usage of the term "Bryansk wolf" is in Alexander Solzhenitsyn's 1951 poem Пир победителей (The Feast of the Victors) The most popular quote is from the song by Yuz Aleshkovsky Comrade Stalin, you are a great scholar:

"Comrade Stalin, you're a real big scholar,
You know what's going on in linguislics,
But I'm a simple Soviet convict
And my comrade is the gray Bryansk wolf."

Jacques Rossi's The Gulag Handbook reports the sentence "a wolf from the Bryansk forest is your comrade, not me!" used in labor camps as a reply to the addressing "Comrade, ..." by a convict to a free hired worker.

== See also ==
- Genghis Khan with a telegraph
- To bomb Voronezh
- Kuzma's mother
- China's final warning
- Russian political jokes
- Hang noodles on the ears
