= Empire of Silver =

Empire of Silver may refer to:

- Empire of Silver (film), a 2009 Chinese film directed by Christina Yao
- Empire of Silver (novel), a 2010 novel by Conn Iggulden
