= Genghis Khan II: Clan of the Gray Wolf =

1992 video game

- Super NES cover art
- Developer: Koei
- Publisher: Koei
- Series: Genghis Khan
- Platforms: MSX2, Famicom, MS-DOS, X68000, NEC PC-9801, PC-88, Genesis, Super NES, Sega CD, TurboGrafx-16, PlayStation
- Release: PC-88: JP: July 30, 1992; PC-98: JP: October 1, 1992; MSX2: JP: December 3, 1992; X68000: JP: Feb 26, 1993; MS-DOS: NA: September 23, 1993; FC, SNES, Genesis: JP: March 25, 1993; NA: December 1993 (SNES, Genesis); Sega CD: JP: September 24, 1993; PC Engine CD: JP: September 30, 1993; PlayStation: JP: September 17, 1998
- Genre: Turn-based strategy
- Modes: Single-player, two-player

Genghis Khan II: Clan of the Gray Wolf, originally released as Aoki Ōkami to Shiroki Mejika: Genchou Hishi (蒼き狼と白き牝鹿・元朝秘史), is a 1992 video game developed by Koei. It is part of Koei's Historical Simulation Series of games, and is the sequel to Genghis Khan, though this is the third game in the series. Genghis Khan II was developed and published for MSX2, Famicom, MS-DOS, X68000, PC-98, PC-88, Mega Drive/Genesis, Super NES, Sega CD, PC Engine, and later PlayStation. The Super NES version was made available on the Wii Virtual Console in North America on June 8, 2009 and in Japan on May 11, 2010.

== Gameplay ==
The player is given the option to conquer either the country of Mongolia as Temujin, the man who would one day become Genghis Khan himself, or as one of three other rivals in that region; or to take over the known world of the time as one of several rulers from throughout Europe, mainland Asia, and North Africa. Conquests are made through the balance of economy, population, buying and selling manufactured goods, family relations, promoting and demoting generals, developing military, all in a turn-based fashion. All of these actions can happen only within a given number of "turn points", so some actions are given priority while others are overlooked. The game also includes a turn-based battle sequence, allowing specific control to the player or delegated to a general.

== Scenarios ==
=== Scenario 1: Conquest of Mongolia ===
In the first scenario, it is the year 1184 AD in Mongolia; the player has the option of controlling four different characters. The objective is to become ruler of the Mongolian steppes (basically control all of Mongolia). At the end of this scenario, if it is beaten by 1212 AD, the player can take on the rest of the world in the fourth scenario, World Conquest. The player gets to lead the fight with their chosen ruler, and their choice of eight generals, and an advisor.

Playable factions:

- Mongols - Temujin
- Jadarans - Jamukha
- Keraites - Togril Khan
- Naimans - Tayan Khan

Players are also given the option of leading various other nations in all of the worldwide scenarios. These nations suffer from a lack of relatives as generals and significantly weaker leaders. Also absent is the ability to hire the elite Mongol units, largely viewed as the most powerful of all units in the game.

=== Scenario 2: Genghis Khan's Grand Ambition ===
This scenario enables the player to take over the world (that part of the world which was known at the time, including Europe, North Africa, and mainland Asia). The player can select to lead one of several countries, each with their varying strengths and weaknesses (for example, only when occupying Japan can Samurai be drafted, and Japan is the starting point for the Kamakura Shogun). In the Korean version of the game the player is able to play as the Goryeo Kingdom, the Korean dynasty during the Mongol invasions.

Playable factions:

- Mongols - Genghis Khan
- Kamakura Shogunate - Minamoto (Minamoto Sanetomo)
- Khorezm Empire - Ala al-Din
- Ghore Sultanate - Ghuri
- Angevin Kingdom - John I (John Lackland)
- Capetian Kingdom - Philip II

=== Scenario 3: The Birth of the Yuan Dynasty ===
The third scenario takes place at the point of the Yuan Dynasty (1274 AD), where Kublai Khan is the ruler of Mongolia and China. The aim is to try to rule the world.

Playable factions:

- Yuan Dynasty - Kublai Khan
- Kamakura Shogunate - Hojo
- Il-Khan Empire - Abaga
- Mameluke Sultanate - Baybars
- Byzantine Empire - Michael VIII
- Sicilian Kingdom - Charles I

=== Scenario 4: Load World Conquest Data ===
The fourth scenario, World Conquest, is unlocked for the year 1185 AD, but only after successful completion of the conquest of Mongolia in the first scenario. The ruler chosen in the first scenario now attempts to take over the world with his Mongol hordes. In this scenario, Genghis Khan is the default leader of the Mongol Empire, with the eight best generals and the best advisor of all the scenarios.

Playable Factions:

- Mongols - (Whichever faction you played in Scenario 1)
- Kamakura Shogunate - Minamoto (Minamoto Yoritomo)
- The Ayyubids - Salah al-Din (Saladin)
- Byzantine Empire - Isaacius II
- Holy Roman Empire - Frederick I (Frederick Barbarossa)
- Angevin Kingdom - Richard I (Richard the Lionhearted)

== Events ==
=== Random occurrences ===
During play, the player can expect some random events, including typhoons, droughts, epidemics, sand storms and blizzards. There can also be bountiful harvests in some countries in the autumn.

=== Family relations ===
An important aspect to the game is to raise one's family; the players must choose who one's daughter is going to marry and who will succeed one's ruler when he dies. As is the case with any scenario, without any successors, the game is over. A strong family-oriented empire is less susceptible to revolutions. The US version of the game removed the harem subgame entirely, in which the player raised their affinity with one of player's wives, much like a dating simulation game.

=== Revolutions ===
Appointing one's son as a general or governor or marrying one's daughter to an already appointed general or governor guarantees that as governor of a province he will not rebel and declare independence from the player's empire. This is especially important when controlling large numbers of provinces, as multiple governors may decide to declare independence at the same time.

If a governor declares independence, a new country is formed in that state, and all troops and resources in that state become at the disposal of the rebellious general. There is no battle for control of the province, as the governor is already established, but if there is a peasant uprising in a player-controlled province, the computer chooses a general to command units of troops against the governor of that province; then the appointed governor must fight a pitched battle for control of the province. If the peasant rebellion wins, or if the province does not have any troops to defend it, then the general in charge of the victorious army forms a new country in that province.

== Reception ==
Electronic Games reviewed the SNES version in 1993 and scored it 83%. Computer Gaming World in 1994 rated the PC version four stars out of five, approving of its combining tactical and strategic play, strong and non-cheating AI, easy-to-learn game play, and lack of bugs. The game was reviewed in 1995 in Dragon #213 by Jay & Dee in the "Eye of the Monitor" column. The reviewers were uncertain how to rate the game, with Jay giving the game "2½ maybe 3" out of 5 stars, and Dee giving it 2 or 3.
