= Temujin (disambiguation) =

Temüjin is the birthname of Genghis Khan, the founder of the Mongol Empire.

Temujin may also refer to:

- Temüjin (video game), a 1997 computer game
- Pürevjavyn Temüüjin or Temujin (born 1994), Mongolian taekwondo Olympian and Asian Games gold medal winner
- Temujin, a character in the Japanese film Naruto the Movie: Legend of the Stone of Gelel
- Temujin, a horse ridden by Chinese equestrian Alex Hua Tian (born 1989) in several competitions

== See also ==
- Genghis (disambiguation)
- Genghis Khan (disambiguation)
- Chinggis (disambiguation)
- Temugin, a Marvel Comics character, the son of the Mandarin, an Iron Man villain
- Temujinia or Temujiniidae, a genera of the Gobiguania clade of extinct iguanian lizards
- Genghis Temüjin Khan, a character in The Hitchhiker's Guide to the Galaxy
