= Andrew Ashton =

English book designer

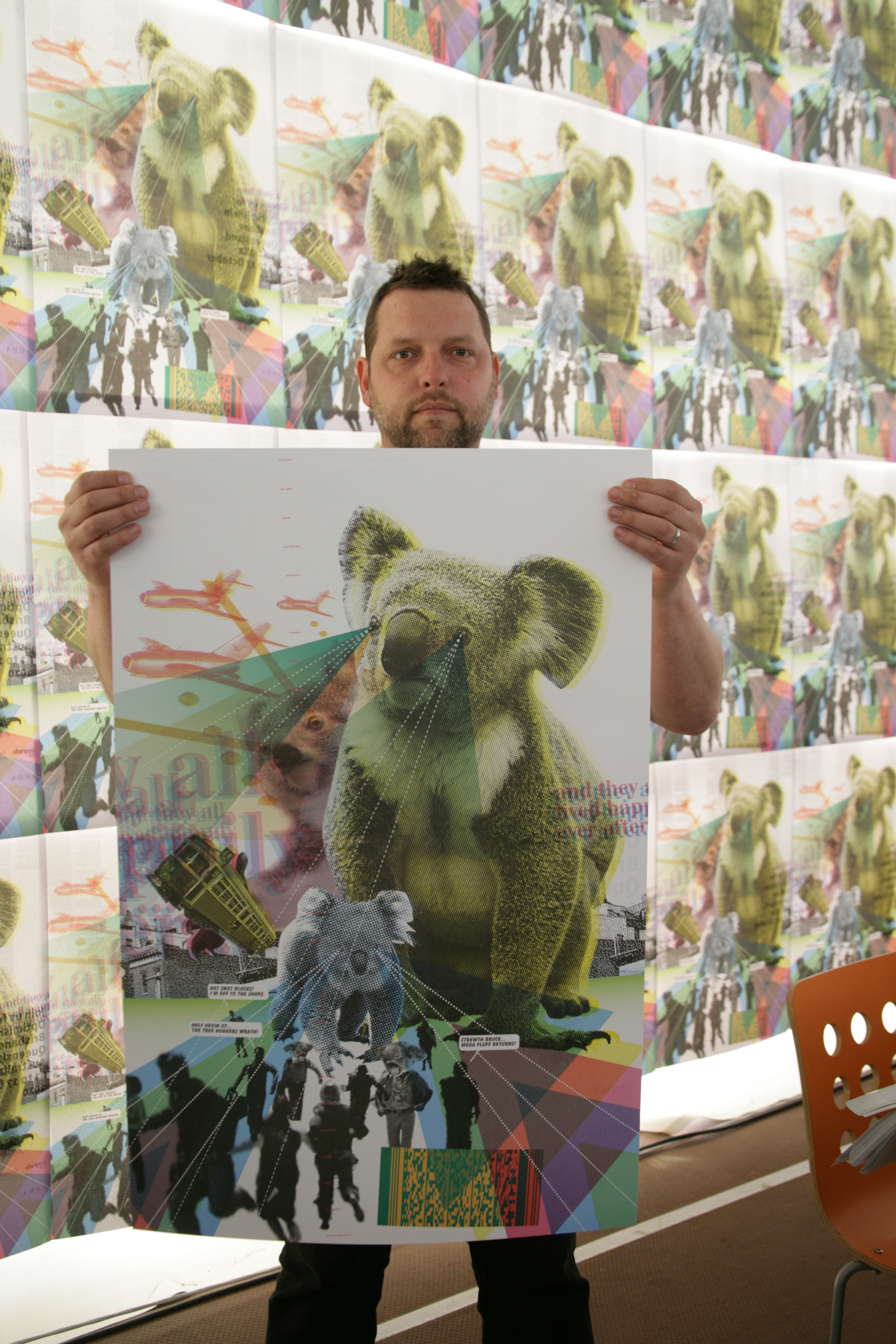
Andrew Ashton with the "Optimism Poster" developed for the 2007 ICOGRADA Conference in Beijing

Andrew Ashton (born 1971) is an English book designer. He began his career in publishing at Kogan Page, the leading UK independent business publisher, in the early nineties. At the turn of the 21st century he moved to HarperCollins publishers where he still works.

Ashton's design for The Dangerous Book for Boys co-won him the 2007 Stora Enso Design and Production award with Nicole Abel (Production) at the British Book Industry Awards. As well as designing the book, he also helped set it with Linde Hardaker and was the colourist for the pictures as well as supplying a couple of pictures including the title motif used on every page.
