= Hang noodles on the ears =

Russian-language idiomatic expression

To hang noodles on the ears (Russian: вешать лапшу на уши, veshat' lapshu na ushi) (Note: ru:Лапша is long flat noodles) is a Russian-language idiomatic expression that means to deceive or fool someone. According to journalist Alexander Kleimenov, in both Russian and Ukrainian, it is similar to the English expression to pull somebody's leg, and author Jag Bhalla agrees.

== Etymology ==
The origin of the phrase is uncertain. One is that the expression contains linguistic similarities to words about stealing and deception and is derived from the Russian thieves' slang "oblaposhit", "to steal", "to deceive", which was allegedly derived from the French word "la poche", "pocket", which sounds like "laposh" in Russian. Another is that it derives from criminal jargon where an "ear" was a street informant and a "noodle" was a rope or cloth that could be used to tie someone up.

Valery Smirnov, known for his expertise in Odesan Russian, claims that in Odesa criminal argot "lapsha" means "lie" and mentions other related expressions, such as "to throw lapsha".

Zaur Zugumov, a famous pickpocket, compiled a book of criminal argot in which he lists an expression "двигать лапшу на уши" ("to move lapsha onto ears") which means to tell lies without particular profit, just for entertainment, to make time go faster in detention. He says the expression has been in use since the time of Russian Empire.

== In verbal usage ==
William Safire, writing in The New York Times, called Michael Gorbachev's usage of the "earthy Russian saying" the most memorable line spoken surrounding the failed 1991 Soviet coup d'état attempt. The new president responded to parliament speaker Anatoly Lukyanov's denial of complicity with, "Don't hang noodles on my ears."

In August and September 1991, The Sydney Morning Herald held a competition, inspired by the Gorbachev quip, for readers to devise their own mysterious and colorful "old Russian sayings", and received "bags of worthy entries".

In 2000, the director of the Stepnogorsk Scientific and Technical Institute for Microbiology admitted that the site was being used for bioweapons research and development and not vaccine production, saying, "we have been hanging noodles on your ears".

In 2009, Jag Bhalla authored a National Geographic compilation of amusing international expressions under the title, "I'm Not Hanging Noodles on Your Ears and Other Intriguing Idioms From Around the World", telling NPR he was not able to determine the expression's origin.

== As political protest ==
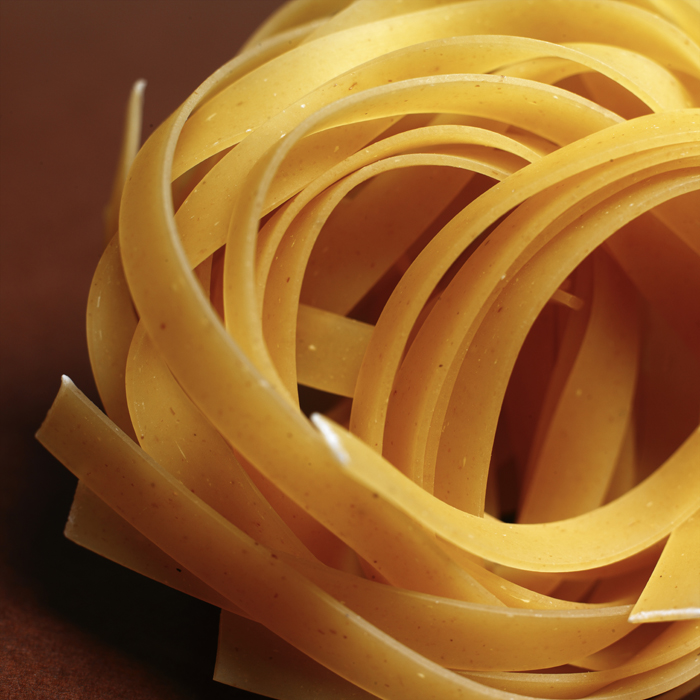
If you hang these noodles on your ears, you might end up in hot water.

During the 2014 Ukrainian revolution, protesters in Odesa threw pots of spaghetti at the Russian consulate to protest the accuracy of that country's media coverage.

In March 2023, Russian politician Mikhail Abdalkin published a photo of himself with noodles on his ears while watching a speech from Vladimir Putin, where the English translation of the caption was, "I fully support. I agree with everything. Great speech. Haven’t heard anything like that in 23 years. Pleasantly surprised." His actions attracted attention and resulted in a fine of 150,000 roubles (about $2,000 USD) for "discrediting the armed forces". Abdalkin, who is appealing the fine, called the noodle-hanging stunt, "Just an ordinary protest" which happened "spontaneously", and was in regard to Russian social policies and not its military actions in Ukraine.

== See also ==
- Disinformation
- Genghis Khan with a telegraph
- Russian political jokes
- There is no sex in the USSR
