= UFC Group =

Food and beverage company of Mongolia

UFC Group is a food and beverage manufacturer based in Mongolia. It is a privately held closed joint-stock company.

== History ==
UFC Group was founded in 1942 under the name "Idesh tejeeliin kombinat" (Идэш тэжээлийн комбинат, literally "foodstuffs combine") as a state-owned enterprise of the Mongolian People's Republic, located in Uvs Province. It remained in government hands until 1997, when it was bought out by private owners and renamed "Uvs hüns" (Увс хүнс, literally "Uvs foods"). As it expanded its businesses it began using its present name UFC Group in 2006. In 2011, the Mongolian Chamber of Commerce and Industry named UFC Group as one of Mongolia's top ten companies.

UFC Group's director-general is O. Amartüvshin.

== Products ==
UFC produces and distributes a variety of products including vodka, soft drinks, bread, biscuits, and iodised salt. Their premium vodka brand is known as "Chingis Silver"; singer B. Sarantuyaa has appeared in promotional activities for it. Another vodka brand of theirs, "Moritoi Chingis" (Морьтой Чингис, literally "Chingis Khan on a horse") received a "Grand Gold" designation from Brussels-based Monde Selection in both 2010 and 2011. The Mongolian Ministry of Nature, Environment and Tourism lists it as one of Mongolia's famous brands.

== Charity work ==
In 2011 UFC distributed foodstuffs to senior citizens during the Tsagaan Sar festivities.
