= Chingiz =

Chingiz, Chinghiz or Chingis is a given name in Central Asia and among some Turkic peoples of the Caucasus, after Genghis Khan. Notable people with the name include:

- Chingiz Abdullayev (born 1959), Azerbaijani writer, Secretary of the Union of Azerbaijani Writers
- Chingiz Aidarbekov (born 1977), Kyrgyz politician
- Chinghiz Aitmatov (1928–2008), Soviet and Kyrgyz author
- Chingiz Allazov (born 1993), Georgian-born Azerbaijiani-Belarusian kickboxer
- Chingis Izmailov (1944–2011), Russian psychophysiologist and psychophysicist, the principal author of the spherical model of color space
- Chingiz Mustafayev (singer), Azerbaijani singer, songwriter, and guitarist
- Chingiz Mustafayev (journalist), Azerbaijani journalist

== See also ==
- Cengiz
