= Batdorj-in Baasanjab =

Baasanjab
- Born: Batdorj-in Baasanjab; 1954 (age 71–72); Hartulga, Bortala, Xinjiang, China
- Occupation: Actor
- Years active: 1984-present
- Spouse: Saran Gua

Chinese name
- Chinese: 巴森扎布
Transcriptions
Standard Mandarin
- Hanyu Pinyin: Bāsēnzhābù

Basen
- Chinese: 巴森
Transcriptions
Standard Mandarin
- Hanyu Pinyin: Bāsēn

Mongolian name
- Mongolian Cyrillic: Батдоржын Баасанжав
- Mongolian script: ᠪᠠᠲᠤᠳᠣᠷᠵᠢ ᠶᠢᠨ ᠪᠠᠰᠠᠩᠵᠠᠪ
- Musical career
- Also known as: Ba Sen (巴森)

Batdorj-in Baasanjab (Mongolian: ᠪᠠᠲᠤᠳᠣᠷᠵᠢ ᠶᠢᠨ
ᠪᠠᠰᠠᠩᠵᠠᠪ, Батдоржын Баасанжав, Batdorjyn Baasanjav; born 1954), also known by his Chinese name Basenzhabu or simply Ba Sen, is a Chinese actor of Mongol descent from Xinjiang Uygur Autonomous Region. He is best known for portraying Genghis Khan in the 2004 Chinese-Mongolian television series, Genghis Khan.

== Career ==
At the age of 13, Ba Sen started learning dancing in the Inner Mongolian Arts School. After graduation, he became a dancer in a group in the Chinese military. Since 1984, he has been working as an actor in the Inner Mongolian Film Agency. His first role was Herder Suhee in the drama Huan Jinhai. He played the eponymous role in the 2004 television series Genghis Khan.

== Personal life ==
Ba Sen married Saran Gua, a singer from the Inner Mongolian Opera and Dance Theatre.

== Filmography ==
=== Film ===
Year	Title	Role	Notes
1993	Donggui Yingxiong Zhuan 東歸英雄傳	Alatansang	
1995	Teshu Qiufan 特殊囚犯		
1997	Yidai Tianjiao Chengji Sihan 一代天驕成吉思汗	Genghis Khan	
2007	Mongol 蒙古王	Yesügei	
2008	Red Cliff 赤壁	Guan Yu	
2012	Aravt	Tsakhar	
2015	Wolf Totem	Bilig	
2018	Genghis Khan		

=== Television ===
Year	Title	Role	Notes
1997	Tutur Tinular	Kau Hsing 1	His only appearance in an Indonesian soap opera
Unconfirmed	Bai Ma 白馬		
Unconfirmed	Tianshen Bu Guaizui De Ren 天神不怪罪的人		
1995	Hunduan Diaoyu Cheng 魂斷釣魚城	Möngke Khan	
2001	Hōjō Tokimune 北條時宗	Kublai Khan	Taiga drama
2003	The Legend of the Condor Heroes 射鵰英雄傳	Genghis Khan	
2004	Geda Huofo 格達活佛	Zeren Dunzhu	
2004	Genghis Khan 成吉思汗	Genghis Khan	
2011	Scarlet Heart 步步驚心	Suwangua'erjia	
2012	Xuan-Yuan Sword: Scar of Sky 軒轅劍:天之痕	Yang Su	
2012	Legend of Yuan Empire Founder 建元風雲	Ögedei Khan	
