= Sarnaveh Changizi =

Sarnaveh Changizi سرناوه چنگيزي
- Village
- Country: Iran
- Province: Lorestan
- County: Kuhdasht
- Bakhsh: Darb-e Gonbad
- Rural District: Boluran

Population (2006)
  - Total: 75
- Time zone: UTC+3:30 (IRST)
  - Summer (DST): UTC+4:30 (IRDT)

Sarnaveh Changizi (Persian: سرناوه چنگيزي, also Romanized as Sarnāveh Changīzī; also known as Rashnow) is a village in Boluran Rural District, Darb-e Gonbad District, Kuhdasht County, Lorestan Province, Iran. At the 2006 census, its population was 75, in 13 families.
