= Chinggis (vodka) =

Brand of vodka from Mongolia

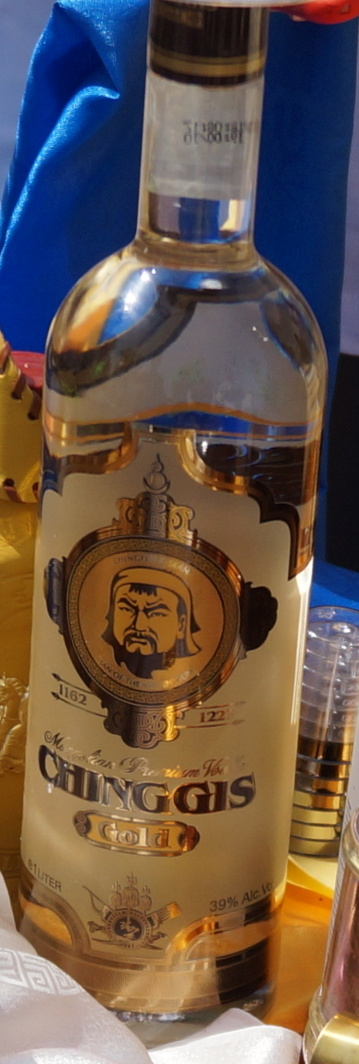

Chinggis is a brand of vodka from Mongolia, produced by the UFC Group and introduced in 2009. It was awarded double gold in the San Francisco World Spirits Competition 2011 and gold medals in the Prod Expo 2009 and the Monde Selection 2010. In Mongolia, Chinggis vodka accounts for 30% of the spirits market.
