= Genghis (robot) =

Early six legged insect-like robot from the 1990s

- Genghis robot on display
- Inventor: Rodney Brooks
- Type: Hexapod walking robot
- Purpose: Experimental robotic mobility and intelligence

Genghis was a six legged insect-like robot that was created by roboticist Rodney Brooks at MIT around 1991. Brooks wanted to solve the problem of how to make robots intelligent and suggested that it is possible to create robots that displayed intelligence by using a "subsumption architecture" which is a type of reactive robotic architecture where a robot can react to the world around them. His paper "Intelligence Without Representation", which is still widely respected in the fields of robotics and Artificial Intelligence, further outlines his theories on this.

== Design ==
The design of the Genghis robot was inspired by insects who have limited brain functions yet possess tremendous functionality. In order to mimic this trait found in insects Brooks "removed all cognition processors from Genghis and left only the sensors and the code/hardware to allow it to walk". This enabled Genghis to link sensation to an action taken where the robot did not have any pre-planned path to follow but took action as each sensor detected an obstacle. With Genghis, Brooks pioneered his "sensation-action theory of intelligence which was to bypass explicit cognition hubs in favor of pairing perception more directly with action".

Genghis was not designed to have a central controller to direct all possible functions in the robot, particularly in the legs. Instead, each leg had its own built-in sensors that would sense the various obstacles in its path. Each leg was programmed with a few basic behaviors and knew how to react under different scenarios based on sensor feedback. The act of walking became a coordinated effort between all of the legs resulting in the robots movement. These processes exist independently, run at all times and fire whenever the sensory preconditions are true.

Genghis was designed to navigate difficult terrain with many obstacles and elevations. In order to achieve this type of functionality while reducing overall complexity Brooks created a method of finite-state machine thought that relied on "layered processing"; a basic layering of new traits over older ones. In Genghis the control system was organized into "eight incremental layers: Stand up, Simple Walk, Force Balancing, Leg Lifting, Whiskers, Pitch Stabilization, Prowling and Steered Prowling". On a processing level the complexity of each of the eight layers of the final movement are addressed separately by each layer, reducing the burden of complex processing from the processors at each level.

Genghis now resides in the Smithsonian Air and Space Museum.
