= Bones of the Hills =

- Bones of the Hills first edition cover.
- Author: Conn Iggulden
- Original title: Bones of the Hills
- Illustrator: Conn Iggulden
- Cover artist: Conn Iggulden
- Language: English
- Series: Conqueror series
- Genre: Historical novel
- Publisher: HarperCollins
- Publication date: 1 September 2008
- Publication place: United Kingdom
- Media type: Print (Hardback & Paperback)
- Pages: 416 pp (first edition)
- ISBN: 978-0-00-720178-5
- OCLC: 230988977
- Preceded by: Lords of the Bow
- Followed by: Empire of Silver

Bones of the Hills (known as Genghis: Bones of the Hills in America) is the third book of the Conqueror series, based on the life of Mongol gurkhan Genghis by Conn Iggulden. It focuses mainly on the Mongol invasion of Islamic Central Asia, the war against Shah Muhammad II of Khwarezm and his son Jalal al-Din Mangburni and the brutal massacres at Urgench and Merv.

== Summary ==
Genghis Khan, powerful leader of a nation united from the tribes, is victorious in the long war against the Chin, the Mongolians' ancient foe. Now trouble arises from another direction: his embassies to the west are rebuffed, his ambassadors murdered.

The nation must embark on its greatest journey, through present day Iran and Iraq, to the edges of India. They face enemies as powerful and ancient as any they have known and the Khan's path will lead them either to victory or utter destruction.

Genghis has proved himself as a warrior and a leader. He must now face the challenges of civilisation, what it will mean for his people and those who come after him. His sons have become generals. He must choose between them before they destroy all he has built.
