= Mohsin Changezi =

Pakistani Urdo Poet

- Born: 9 March 1979; Quetta, Balochistan, Pakistan
- Education: BA in Urdu literature, Iqbaliat & Persian .
- Occupation: Urdu poet
- Writing career
- Genre: Nazm
- Notable awards: Tamgha-e-Imtiaz

Mohsin Changazi, (Hazaragi: محسن چنگیزی) (born 3 September 1979), is a Pakistani Urdu poet of Hazara descent. He has participated in several Mushaira (poetic symposiums) in Karachi, Lahore and Islamabad. He has also received awards including the Tamgha-e-Imtiaz in 2010.

== Awards ==
- Tamgha-e-Imtiaz in 2010.
- Nashan-i-ghazal Award
- Star of the Night
- Gold Medal and Shield.
