= Genghis Hills =

Topographical elevations in the Shackleton Range in Antarctica

The Genghis Hills (80°44′S 28°2′W) are hills rising to 1,305 metres (4,280 ft) to the south of Fuchs Dome and 4 nautical miles (7 km) west of Stephenson Bastion, in the Shackleton Range, Antarctica. They were photographed from the air by the U.S. Navy, 1967, and surveyed by the British Antarctic Survey (BAS), 1968–71. They were named by the UK Antarctic Place-Names Committee in 1971 after Graham K. ("Genghis") Wright, a BAS general assistant at Halley Station, 1968–71, who took part in the survey, 1969–70.
