= Changezi =

Surname in Pakistan and India

Changezi is a Turkic-origin surname in Pakistan and India. It is the equivalent of Iranian and Afghan Changizi and comes from the name of Changez Khan (Genghis Khan) and/or his soldiers who came to West and South Asia. It is common among Moghol, Mughal, Hazara, Aimaq, and some Turkic peoples within Central, South and West Asia in particular.

== Notable people with this name ==
- Asghar Ali Changezi, Pakistani boxer
- Ismail Changezi, Pakistani television actor.
- Yagana Changezi, pseudonym of Mirza Wajid Husain (1884–1956), Indian Urdu-language poet
- Younus Changezi (born 1944), Pakistani footballer and politician
- Naseem Mirza Changezi, Indian independence activist
- Wajahat Mirza Changezi, Indian screenwriter and film director of the 1950s–60s
- Mohsin Changezi, Pakistani Urdu poet
- Mushtaque Changezi, Pakistani filmmaker
- Sharbat Ali Changezi, Pakistani general
- Jan Ali Changezi,, Pakistani politician
