= Ismail Changezi =

Pakistani television actor (1954–2019)

- Born: 19 December 1954; Lahore, Punjab, Pakistan
- Died: 17 July 2019 (aged 64); Karachi, Sindh, Pakistan
- Occupation: Actor
- Known for: Jinn Chacha

Ismail Changezi (19 December 1954 – 17 July 2019) was a Pakistani television actor. He was known for 1980s drama Jinn Chacha.

== Biography ==
Ismail was born on 19 December 1954 in Lahore. He later moved to Karachi.

He appeared in more than 100 dramas, including Jangloos, Mandi, God Father, Ankahi, Zero Point and Fifty Fifty. He played the lead role in Jinn Chacha (1980s) and acclaimed fame. He appeared in many as a supporting actor and was known for the playing of negative characters.

Ismail died on 17 July 2019 in Karachi.
