= Chuluuny Khulan =

Mongol actress

Khulan Chuluuny Чулууны Хулан
- Born: May 30, 1985 (age 39); Kharkhorin, Övörkhangai, Mongolia
- Occupation: Actress
- Years active: 2005–present
- Spouse: Naryn Igilik (m. 2007)

Khulan Chuluuny (Mongolian: Чулууны Хулан; born May 30, 1985) is a Mongol actress and assistant director who first gained international notice as Börte, the wife of Genghis Khan, in the 2007 Oscar nominated Russian film Mongol.

== Career ==
Khulan was a student in 2006 hoping to join the country's military and enroll in a military school when she was discovered by Guka Omarova, the casting agent for Mongol, while standing in a visa line at the Chinese embassy in Ulaanbaatar. Bodrov and Omarova had wanted to cast a Mongol woman as Genghis Khan's wife but with two weeks to go before filming they were uncertain about their choices. After meeting with her, Bodrov decided to take a risk on the non-professional actress and subsequently cast her in the role of Börte.

Khulan served as assistant director on the 2009 Kazakh gangster film Lave (Kazakh: Лавэ) and the 2012 Kazakh films The Old Man (Kazakh: Шал) and Mech Pobedy (Меч Победы). She starred as Queen of the Oirats in the 2017 Kazakh television production The Kazakh Khanate.

She also portrayed a Scythian warrior in a documentary for the Smithsonian Institution.

== Personal life ==
Khulan met Naryn Igilik, Bodrov's Kazakh assistant, while on the set of Mongol. Later, the couple were wed as part of the film's opening night celebrations in Kazakhstan. She and her husband now reside in Kazakhstan, near Almaty.
