= Genghis Grill =

American fast casual restaurant chain

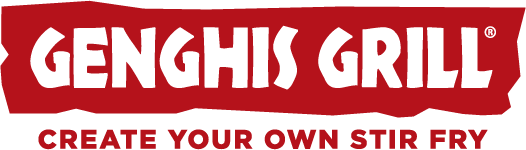
- Type: LLC
- Industry: Fast casual restaurants
- Founded: 1998
- Founder: Jeff Sinelli
- Headquarters: Irving, Texas, United States
- Key people: Gregg Majewski (CEO)
- Parent: Craveworthy Brands
- Website: genghisgrill.com

Genghis Grill is an American fast casual restaurant chain. Founded in 1998, it specializes in Mongolian barbecue-style stir-fry. It is headquartered in Irving, Texas. The chain is a subsidiary of the Illinois-based Craveworthy Brands.

== History ==
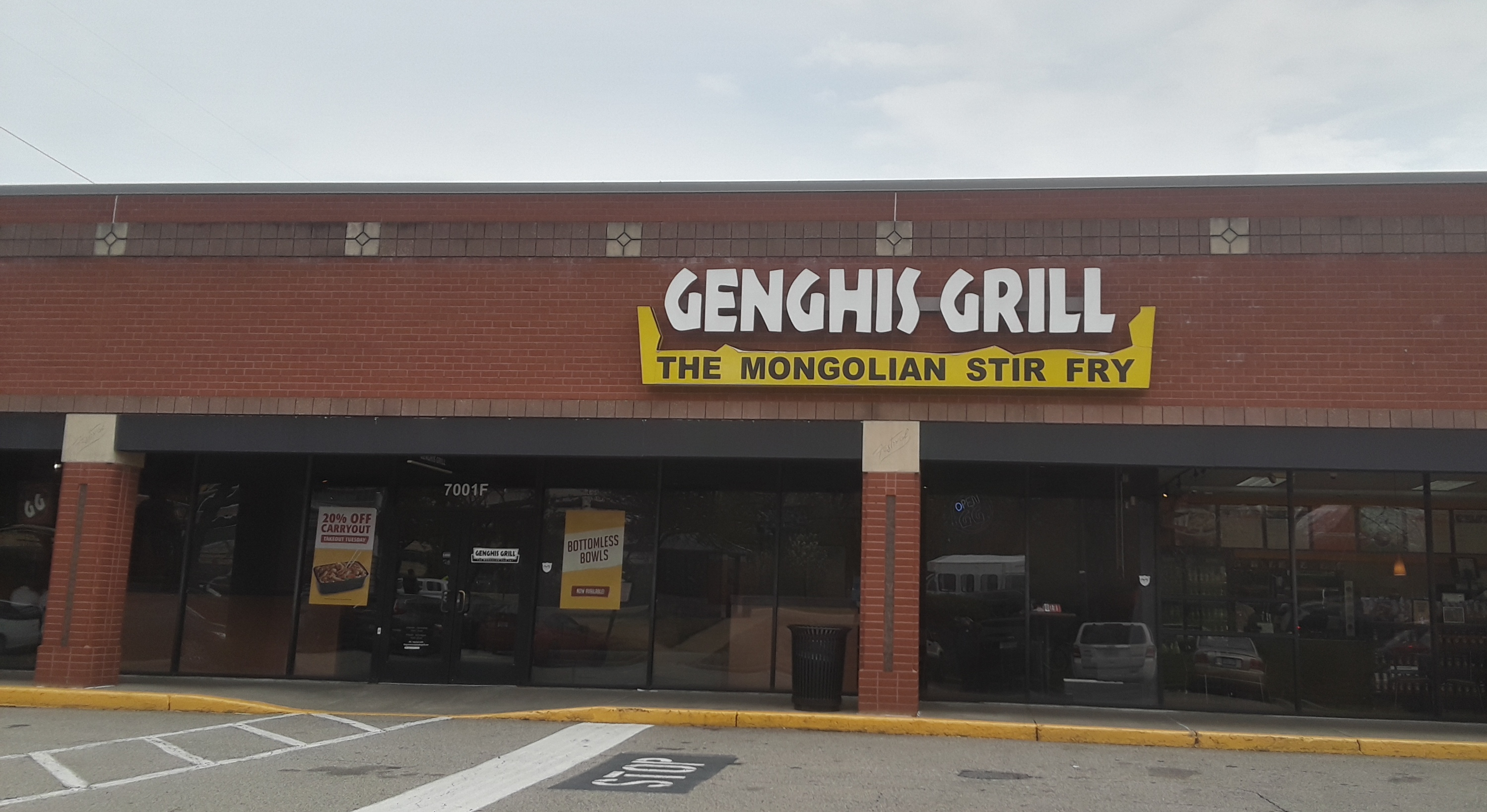
A Genghis Grill franchise in Fairfax County, Virginia, since closed.

Jeff Sinelli founded the concept in 1998, after acquiring the goodwill of a defunct Dallas Mongolian barbecue restaurant and rebranding it as Genghis Grill.

In 2004, Al Bhakta and partners in the Chalak Group purchased the company from the original franchisor.

In 2017, Mongolian Concepts was formed to bring together Genghis Grill, bd's Mongolian Grill, and Flat Top Grill under one parent company. Nation's Restaurant News reported former Jimmy John's executive Gregg Majewski was named chief executive of Mongolian Concepts in 2021.

In 2023, Craveworthy Brands announced the acquisition of Mongolian Concepts and its brands, including Genghis Grill; Majewski remained CEO.

== Operations ==
Nation's Restaurant News, citing Technomic Ignite data, reported that Genghis Grill ended 2024 with 22 locations, a 35.3% decrease from 2023.

The company's website lists locations in New Mexico, Nevada, Ohio, Oklahoma, Texas, and Virginia. It is one of the restaurants at Tempe Marketplace in Tempe, Arizona.

== See also ==
- Mongolian barbecue
