= Empire of Silver (novel) =

- Empire of Silver first edition cover.
- Author: Conn Iggulden
- Illustrator: Conn Iggulden
- Language: English
- Series: Conqueror series
- Genre: Historical novel
- Publisher: HarperCollins (UK); Delacorte Press (US)
- Publication date: 2010
- Publication place: United Kingdom
- Media type: Print (Hardback)
- Pages: 448 pp (first edition)
- ISBN: 0-00-720180-X
- Preceded by: Bones of the Hills
- Followed by: Conqueror

Empire of Silver (known as Ogedai: Empire of Silver in America) is the fourth book of the Conqueror series, based on the life of Mongol warlord Genghis's son Ogedai by Conn Iggulden. It focuses mainly on the Mongol attacks on Russia, the problems of succession and the building of Karakorum.
