= Changizi =

Changizi (Persian: چنگیزی, lit. 'of or relating to Genghis Khan') may refer to

- pertaining to Mughal tribe
- a surname of Iranian origin notably borne by
  - Mark Changizi, an evolutionary neurobiologist
  - Sebastian Kolze Changizi
- Sarnaveh Changizi, a village in Boluran Rural District, Darb-e Gonbad District, Kuhdasht County, Lorestan Province, Iran

== See also ==
- Chinggis (disambiguation)
- Changezi (equivalent in Hindi and Urdu), surname
