= Genghis Khan (TV programme) =

- Genre: Documentary
- Written by: Isabelle Grey
- Directed by: Edward Bazalgette
- Starring: Orgil Makhaan
- Country of origin: United Kingdom
- Original language: English
- No. of series: 1
- No. of episodes: 1

Production
- Producers: Jonathan Stamp and Edward Bazalgette
- Running time: 50 minutes

Original release
- Network: BBC
- Release: 25 April 2005

Genghis Khan is a 2005 BBC documentary co-produced with Discovery Channel UK detailing the life of the 13th-century Mongol warlord Genghis Khan. It starred Orgil Makhaan as Genghis Khan, voiced by Kenneth Cranham. It was directed by Edward Bazalgette. It was narrated by Alisdair Simpson. It was shot entirely on location in Mongolia with a Mongolian cast. Battle scenes were recreated using the same CGI techniques as The Lord of the Rings trilogy.

The documentary sets out to redress what it sees as the unwarranted negative reputation of the Mongol leader. The film portrays him as a benevolant leader who put a stop to internecine tribal warfare. Although the film does portray the brutality of the Mongol conquests, Joe Joseph in The Times writes that it sometimes oversold itself.

Battle scene from the film

In 2015, China deported twenty foreigners (British, South African, and Indian) for watching the film in their hotel in Inner Mongolia. The Chinese authorities claimed the film promoted terrorism and religious extremism. China is hostile to separatist groups or those campaigning for more rights for ethnic Mongols.

== Orgil Makhaan ==
Orgil Makhaan went on to star as Jamucha in By the Will of Chingis Khan, a 2009 joint Mongolian and Russian film production. He has also featured as a judge in the Mongolian The Models TV show. He was the Mongolian organiser for the Netflix series Marco Polo and in 2017 founded the Mongolian National Film Commission with himself as president.
