= Genghis Khan (2004 TV series) =

- DVD cover art
- Chinese: 成吉思汗
- Hanyu Pinyin: Chéng Jí Sī Hán
- Genre: Historical drama
- Written by: Yu Zhixian; Zhu Yaoting
- Directed by: Wang Wenjie
- Starring: Ba Sen; Saren Gaowa; Suo Lizhong; Zhao Hengxuan
- Ending theme: "Legend" (传说) performed by Tengge'er
- Country of origin: China
- Original languages: Mandarin; Mongolian (dubbed)
- No. of episodes: 30

Production
- Executive producers: Bate'er; Wang Wensheng; Wang Yongquan
- Producers: Zhang Guomin; Jiang Kun; Du Jie; Agula; Liu Rui; Zhulan Qiqige
- Production locations: Mongolia; China
- Running time: 45 minutes per episode

Original release
- Network: CCTV (China); KBS (South Korea)

Genghis Khan is a Chinese television series based on the life of Genghis Khan, the founder of the Mongol Empire in the 13th century. Ba Sen, who portrayed the eponymous character in the series, is a descendant of Genghis Khan's second son, Chagatai. The series was first broadcast on CCTV in China in 2004, on KBS in South Korea in 2005, and the Turkish state channel TRT 1.

== Plot ==
The 30 episodes long television series depicts the major events in the life of Temüjin, the founder of the Mongol Empire in the 13th century. It begins with his birth and his struggle for survival in his childhood and adolescent years after the death of his father, Yesugei. With support from his allies and his father's former followers, Temüjin becomes the leader of the Borjigin tribe and emerges as one of the most powerful warlords in Mongolia. After spending decades on the battlefield, Temüjin eventually succeeds in uniting all the Mongol tribes under his rule and adopts the honorific title "Genghis Khan" ("supreme ruler" in the Mongol language). Genghis Khan continues to lead his armies to attack the Khwarezmid Empire in the west and the Jurchen-led Jin Empire in the south before dying from illness during a campaign against the Western Xia kingdom.

== International broadcast ==
Region	Network(s)/Station(s)	Series premiere	Title (if different from original)
China	CCTV	2004	
Mongolia	MNB	2004	
Taiwan	CTV	2005	
South Korea	KBS	10 September - 18 December 2005	칭기즈칸
Thailand	5HD1	February 4, 2019 – 26 March 26, 2019 (every Monday to Thursday 22:40–23:30)	เจงกิสข่าน จักรพรรดิสะท้านแผ่นดิน
