= Wolf of the Plains =

2007 historical novel by Conn Iggulden

- First edition cover
- Author: Conn Iggulden
- Language: English
- Series: Conqueror series
- Genre: Historical novel
- Publisher: HarperCollins
- Publication date: 2 January 2007
- Publication place: United Kingdom
- Media type: Print (hard and paperback)
- Pages: 464 pp (first edition)
- ISBN: 0-00-720174-5
- OCLC: 71346649
- Followed by: Lords of the Bow

Wolf of the Plains (2007) is a historical novel from English author Conn Iggulden. It is the first book in the Conqueror series based on the Mongols of the Asian steppes. It is titled Genghis: Birth of an Empire in the United States.

After completing the Emperor series on the life of Julius Caesar, Iggulden began research for his next series of books, based on the life of Mongol warlord Genghis Khan. In the author's note of the book, Iggulden explains he traveled to rural Mongolia during his research.

== Plot summary ==
The narrative follows the early life of Temujin, the second son of Yesugei, the khan of the Mongolian "Wolves" tribe. His father is attacked by assassins and soon dies from his injuries. Yesugei's first bondsman, Eeluk, assumes control of the tribe. Fearing the sons of the former khan may contest his leadership when they reach adulthood, Eeluk banishes Temujin's family from the tribe, leaving them to fend for themselves on the harsh Steppes. The expectation was that Temujin's family would perish in the unforgiving winter, but Temujin, along with his mother Hoelun, his four brothers Bekter, Khasar, Kachiun, Temüge, and his baby sister Temulun, survived against all the odds, albeit in poverty. In an argument over food, Temujin kills his older brother Bekter, much to his mother's anguish.

After a few years of trading with other wandering families, the family establish a small home. But the Wolf tribe return to the area, and advanced riders, sent by Eeluk to ensure the family had perished, capture Temujin. He is taken back to the tribe where he is tortured, and kept in a pit, in preparation for a ritual murder. He is freed by Arslan and Jelme, father and son wanderers who joined the Wolves after looking for Yesugei, whom Arslan owed a debt. They join Temujin and his family and begin a new tribe, accepting other wandering families into their protection. Temujin assumes the role of khan.

Temujin returns to the Olkhunut to claim his wife Borte. Shortly after, Borte is captured by a Tartar raiding party. Temujin and his brothers chase down the captors and murder them, recovering Borte. The small army retaliates with repeated raids on Tartar camps. The Tartars respond by sending armies to crush the new menace. It is then that a Chin emissary approaches Temujin with an offer from Toghrul, Khan of the Kerait. Temujin joins his small fledgling tribe with Toghrul's, and leads a joint army to advance on the Tartars. It is in the following battle that Temujin begins to show outstanding tactical abilities, as the Mongols ease to victory. Upon interrogating a Tartar prisoner, Temujin learns that the leader of the Olkhunut conspired with the Chin to lead the Tartar assassins to his father. He also learns that a massive Tartar army is advancing into Mongol lands.

Temujin returns to the Kerait, then travels to the Olkhunut tribe, where he murders the khan in his ger and assumes leadership of the tribe, and takes them back to join the Kerait. The Mongol alliance prepares for battle, when they are joined by the Wolves. Temujin and Eeluk agree to settle their feud upon victory over the Tartars. Under Temujin's faultless leadership and strategy, the Tartar army is crushed. As the battle ends, Temujin and Eeluk fight, with Temujin emerging victorious. He claims leadership of the Wolves and takes the warriors back to the Kerait.

Fearing an inevitable challenge to his leadership, Toghrul sends assassins to Temujin's ger. The attempt is unsuccessful, and Toghrul is banished out of the unified tribe. Temujin proclaims himself khan of all Mongol tribes and bestows the name Genghis upon himself.

== Publication details ==
- 2007, UK, HarperCollins (ISBN 0007201745), Pub date 2 January 2007, hardback (First edition)

== Reception ==
Sue Arnold, in a review in The Guardian, thought the book "every bit as dazzling and action-packed" as Iggulden's previous Emperor series. Suchitra Behal, of The Hindu, opined that despite "some liberties with historical facts", the work was a "brilliant portrait of Genghis Khan".
