= Dschinghis Khan (disambiguation) =

Dschinghis Khan is a German Eurodisco pop band.

Dschinghis Khan may also refer to:

- Dschinghis Khan (song), West German entry in the Eurovision Song Contest 1979 performed by the aforementioned band
- Dschinghis Khan (album), a 1979 album by the aforementioned band
- Dschingis Khan, German for Genghis Khan

== See also ==
- Genghis Khan (disambiguation)
