= Conn Iggulden =

British author (born 1971)

- Born: Connor Iggulden; 24 February 1971 (age 55); London, England
- Occupation: Author
- Children: 4
- Writing career
- Pen name: C.F. Iggulden (fantasy)
- Genres: Historical fiction; fantasy
- Notable works: Dangerous Book for Boys series Conqueror series Emperor series Wars of the Roses series Empire of Salt trilogy

Connor Iggulden (/ˈɪɡəldɛn/; born 24 February 1971) is a British author who writes historical fiction, most notably the Emperor and Conqueror series. He has also co-authored the nonfiction book The Dangerous Book for Boys with his brother Hal, describing various games and activities for children. In 2007, Iggulden became the first person to top the UK fiction and nonfiction lists at the same time.

== Background ==
Born in 1971 to an English father (who was an RAF pilot during the Second World War) and an Irish mother, Iggulden went to Sacred Heart Roman Catholic Primary in Ruislip, Middlesex, then attended St Martins School in Northwood, before moving on to Merchant Taylors' School. He then attended St Dominic's Sixth Form College, before studying English at the University of London, later going on to teach the subject for seven years, becoming head of the English department at Haydon School, where one of his students was Fearne Cotton. Iggulden eventually left teaching to write his first novel, The Gates of Rome, which was published in 2003.

He is married to Ella, who is from the Amalfi Coast in southern Italy, and whose family are craft pasta and ravioli producers in the region. The couple have four children and live in Hertfordshire, England.

In August 2014, Iggulden was one of 200 public figures who signed a letter to The Guardian, opposing Scottish independence in the run-up to September's referendum on that issue.

== Career ==
=== Historical fiction ===
Iggulden's debut book was The Gates of Rome (2003), the first in a five-part series entitled Emperor. The series is based around the life of Julius Caesar, from childhood (The Gates of Rome) to his eventual betrayal and death (The Gods of War). The author has written a fifth book in the series, Emperor: The Blood of Gods, which deals with the rise of Augustus and events after the end of The Gods of War. This book was published on 26 September 2013.

After completing the fourth book in the Emperor series, Iggulden began research for his next series of books, titled Conqueror, based on the life of Mongol warlords Genghis, Ogedai, and Kublai Khan. The first book, Wolf of the Plains, was published on 2 January 2007. The second, Lords of the Bow, came out a year later. Bones of the Hills, the third book in the series, was released on 1 September 2008. In September 2010, Empire of Silver, which revolves around the life of Genghis Khan's son, Ogedai, was published.

Iggulden released a four-book series, the Wars of the Roses, starting with Stormbird in 2013, Margaret of Anjou (called Trinity in the UK) in 2014, Bloodline in 2015, and Ravenspur in 2016.

In 2017, he published a historical fiction novel called Dunstan, chronicling the life of the 10th-century monk and political adviser to the Saxon Kings of England, St. Dunstan.

In 2018, Penguin Books released a historical novel called The Falcon of Sparta, about the effort of Prince Cyrus to become king of Persia and the stranded 10,000 Greek mercenaries who walked out of Persia while pursued by the king's armies, following the Battle of Cunaxa.

In 2021, Iggulden released a two-part Athenian series, The Gates of Athens and Protector. Set during the Greco-Persian Wars, it features the Battle of Marathon and the Battle of Thermopylae.

In 2022, he published the first in a two-part series, The Golden Age, titled Lion. Set a generation after his Athenian series, it follows Pericles' rise in Athens, the formation of the Delian League, and the Battle of the Eurymedon. His second and final book in the series, which came out in 2023, is titled Empire.

=== Children's books ===
Iggulden has co-written a book with his brother Hal, The Dangerous Book for Boys. It covers around eighty topics, from building a soapbox racer and tying knots, to learning about famous battles and how to make potassium aluminium sulphate crystals. It was released in the UK in June 2006, reprinted a month later, and was voted British Book of the Year at the Galaxy British Book Awards.

In September 2009, he published the children's book Tollins: Explosive Tales for Children, through HarperCollins. Iggulden has since written three separate stories to accompany it.

=== Other works ===
In March 2006, Iggulden released a novelette entitled Blackwater, part of the Quick Reads initiative of World Book Day 2006. Being a thriller, Blackwater was a change in genre for the author, who had mainly written historical fiction up to that point.

In 2012, Iggulden added a further Quick Reads book to the list, Quantum of Tweed – The Man with a Nissan Micra – a comedy about an unwitting hitman.

=== Fantasy novels ===
In 2017, Iggulden released the first book in the fantasy series Darien: Empire of Salt, under the pen name C.F. Iggulden. The second book, Shiang, was released in 2018 and was followed by The Sword Saint, in 2019.

=== Emperor series film adaptation ===
In 2010, media coverage emerged of a proposed film, Emperor: Young Caesar, about the early life of Julius Caesar, covering the years from 92 BC to 71 BC, and based on the first two novels of Iggulden's Emperor series, The Gates of Rome and The Death of Kings. Exclusive Media Group hired Burr Steers to direct, after they had an adaptation penned by William Broyles and Stephen Harrigan.

== Bibliography ==
=== Emperor series ===
- The Gates of Rome (2003)
- The Death of Kings (2004)
- The Field of Swords (2005)
- The Gods of War (2006)
- The Blood of Gods (2013)

=== Conqueror series ===
- Wolf of the Plains (2007, ISBN 978-0-00-720175-4) (titled Genghis: Birth of an Empire 2010, ISBN 978-0-385-34421-0)
- Lords of the Bow (2008, ISBN 978-0-00-720177-8) (titled Genghis: Lords of the Bow 2010, ISBN 978-0-385-34279-7)
- Bones of the Hills (2008, ISBN 978-0-00-720179-2) (titled Genghis: Bones of the Hills 2010, ISBN 978-0-385-34280-3)
- Empire of Silver (2010, ISBN 978-0-00-728800-7) (titled Genghis: Empire of Silver 2010, ISBN 978-0-385-33954-4)
- Conqueror (2011, ISBN 978-0-00-727114-6)

=== Wars of the Roses series ===
- Stormbird (2013)
- Trinity (2014) (titled Margaret of Anjou in North America)
- Bloodline (2015)
- Ravenspur (2016)

=== Athenian series ===
- The Gates of Athens (2019)
- Protector (2021)

=== The Golden Age series ===
- Lion (2022)
- Empire (2023)

=== Empire of Salt series ===
- Darien (2017) (Empire of Salt book #1) [as C.F. Iggulden]
- Shiang (2018) (Empire of Salt book #2) [as C.F. Iggulden]
- The Sword Saint (2019) (Empire of Salt book #3) [as C.F. Iggulden]

=== Dangerous books ===
- The Dangerous Book for Boys (2007) (with Hal Iggulden)
- The Pocket Dangerous Book for Boys: Things to Do (2007) (with Hal Iggulden)
- The Dangerous Book for Boys Yearbook (2007) (with Hal Iggulden)
- The Pocket Dangerous Book for Boys: Things to Know (2008) (with Hal Iggulden)
- The Pocket Dangerous Book for Boys: Wonders of the World (2008) (with Hal Iggulden)
- The Pocket Dangerous Book for Boys: Facts, Figures and Fun (2008) (with Hal Iggulden)
- The Dangerous Book of Heroes (2009) (with David Iggulden)
- The Double Dangerous Book for Boys (2019) (with Arthur and Cameron Iggulden)

=== Nero series ===
- Nero (2024)
- Tyrant (2025)
- Inferno (2026)

=== Ink and Iron series ===
- Forged in Rome (2025)

=== Other ===
- Blackwater (2006)
- Tollins: Explosive Tales for Children (2009)
- How to Blow Up Tollins (with Lizzy Duncan) (2010)
- Quantum of Tweed – The Man with the Nissan Micra (2012)
- Dunstan (2017), a.k.a. The Abbot's Tale (USA, 2018)
- The Falcon of Sparta (2018)
