= Genghis Khan (video game) =

1987 video game

- NES cover art
- Developer: Koei
- Publisher: Koei
- Composer: Yoko Kanno
- Series: Genghis Khan
- Platforms: MSX, NES, Amiga, MS-DOS
- Release: PC-98: JP: December 1987; MSX, X68000: JP: 1988; MS-DOS: NA: 1989; NES: JP: April 20, 1989; NA: January 1990; Amiga: EU: 1990
- Genre: Turn-based strategy
- Modes: Single-player, multiplayer

Genghis Khan, original full title Aoki Ōkami to Shiroki Mejika: Genghis Khan (蒼き狼と白き牝鹿・ジンギスカン), is a turn-based strategy game developed by Koei, originally released for the PC-98 in 1987, MSX and X68000 in 1988, MS-DOS and NES in 1990, and Amiga in 1990. It is the second game in the series, after a 1985 Aoki Ōkami to Shiroki Mejika for PC-88, PC-98 and MSX.

== Plot ==
The game takes the player inside the virtual life of either Genghis Khan or one of his archrivals. The player must arrange marriages, father children, appoint family members to governmental positions, and fight in order to conquer the Old World. Armies must be drafted and soldiers must be trained if the player is to rule the lands from England to Japan.

== Gameplay ==
The game has two different ways to play. The first is Mongol Conquest, which begins in the year 1175 AD, which is a one player mode. Players assume control of Lord Temujin and they must conquer the land by keeping their economy stable, having their army ready to fight, and by attacking other lands. The second is World Conquest, where the goal is to conquer every opposing country.

World Conquest, which begins in the year 1206 AD, is started by choosing the number of players and difficulty. It supports one to four players. Players must choose who they want to be; Genghis Khan (Mongols), Alexios III (Byzantine), Richard (England), or Yoritomo (Japan). Then each player must randomly select the stats of their leader and successors. The player must stop a random number to choose the certain stat. This is done until all stats are chosen for the certain character, but they can be redone. After everyone is ready to go, the game begins. The countries of Eurasia cycle through; when it goes through a country, it means they have used their turn. When it comes to a player's country, they get to make three choices. These choices include training the troops, buying a certain product/quantity from a merchant, drafting soldiers, sending a treaty, or going to war. Each act takes one choice away until the three choices are used; then the cycle continues. Once every country has used their turns, the season changes and the cycle goes through again, but in a different order. Seasons determine when the players must pay own troops, when the farmers harvest the crop, when food must be distributed, etc.

== Reception ==
In 1989, Computer Gaming World called Genghis Khan "the toughest, most satisfying, and richest historical simulation yet!". In a 1990 survey of pre-20th-century wargames the magazine gave it four out of five stars, and in 1993 three stars. Orson Scott Card viewed it unfavorably, writing in Compute! that compared to Romance "the tedium is back" regarding gameplay, but another reviewer for the magazine stated that Genghis Khan is an "excellent" prerequisite to a real leadership experience because it forces the players to gauge own resources before making decisions. In 2008, Armağan Yavuz, the co-founder of Turkish developer TaleWorlds cited Koei's Genghis Khan as an influence on their Mount & Blade series.
