= Cengiz Özek =

- Born: June 4, 1964; Istanbul, Turkey
- Occupations: Puppeteer, theatre director

Cengiz Özek (born June 4, 1964) is a Turkish traditional shadow theatre manipulator of Karagöz. He established Istanbul's first annual international puppet festival, Istanbul International Puppet Festival, in 1998, and has organized it every May since then.

Özek started performing with a shadow theatre in 1977 at the age of 13. He produced then Magic Tree, a shadow theatre play based on Turkish tradition. In 1998, he produced The Garbage Monster, which, whereas uses the traditional characters of Karagöz and Hacivat, introduces the Garbage Monster and addresses the problems of ecology.
