= Cengiz =

- Gender: Male

Origin
- Region of origin: Turkey

Other names
- Related names: Cengizhan, Chinghiz, Genghis

Cengiz is the Turkish form of Genghis, as in Genghis Khan. Notable people with the name include:

== Given name ==
- Cengiz Aktar (born 1955), Turkish political scientist, journalist and writer
- Cengiz Bektaş (1934–2020), Turkish architect, engineer, poet and writer
- Cengiz Biçer (born 1987), Liechtenstein football goalkeeper
- Cengiz Çandar (born 1948), Turkish journalist
- Cengiz Dağcı (1919–2011), Crimean Tatar novelist and poet
- Cengiz Doğu (1945–2019), German poet and activist
- Cengiz Kavaklıoğlu (born 1968), Turkish sprinter
- Cengiz Koç (born 1977), German heavyweight boxer
- Cengiz Küçükayvaz (born 1968), Turkish actor
- Cengiz Kurtoğlu (born 1959), Turkish musician
- Cengiz Özek (born 1964), Turkish puppeteer
- Cengiz Topel (1934–1964), Turkish fighter pilot
- Cengiz Ünder (born 1997), Turkish football player

== Middle name ==
- Mehmet Cengiz Oz (born 1960), American television presenter and 17th Administrator of the Centers for Medicare & Medicaid Services

== Surname ==
- Hakan Cengiz (born 1967), Turkish-German football coach
- Hüseyin Cengiz (born 1984), Turkish-Dutch footballer
- Mustafa Cengiz (businessman) (1949–2021), Turkish businessman and former president of the sports club Galatasaray S.K.
- Orhan Kemal Cengiz, Turkish lawyer, journalist and human rights activist

== See also ==
- Chingiz, given name
- Cengizhan Kartaltepe, Turkish volleyball player
- Cengiz Topel Naval Air Station, Turkish Navy air station located east of İzmit in Kocaeli Province, Turkey
- Cengiz Holding, Turkish conglomerate of construction, energy, mining, and tourism
