= Armenian Red Army =

Field army in the Russian Civil War

The Armenian Red Army (Armenian: Հայկական կարմիր բանակ) was a field army of the pro-Bolshevik Red Army during the Russian Civil War. It was created by the Armenian SSR's government on 6 December 1920 on the foundation of the Armenian Separate Rifle Regiment, which had been founded in Baku, Azerbaijan that October under the leadership of the Foreign Bureau of the Communist Party of Armenia and the Revolutionary Military Council of the 11th Army.

The Armenian Red Army modeled after the Red Army of the RSFSR, and included the People's Commissariat for Military Affairs headed by A. S. Nurijanyan, a political department, an institute of commissioners. On 1 January 1921, M.V. Molkochanov was appointed commander of the army and I. Sviridov was appointed military commissar.

== Background and creation ==
In July 1920, the Armenian Regiment was formed in Ganja, Azerbaijan within the 20th Division of the RSFSR's 11th Army, which was sent to Baku on July 27 to reinforce the 32nd Division. The Armenian Regiment had a strength of 750 soldiers, mostly participants of the pro-Bolshevik May Uprising. The Armenian Separate Rifle Regiment would be founded on 16 October 1920 in Baku, attached to the 32nd Division, led by its commander Ivan Panfilov and military commissar Garegin Yesayan. The Regiment moved into Armenia with the 20th Rifle Division in November and then entered Yerevan with the 11th Red Army via Kanaker.

On the orders of the Yerjanyan group of the 11th Army, the Armenian Separate Rifle Regiment was transformed into the Armenian Red Army on 2 December 1920. The Revolutionary Committee of Armenia appointed Avis Nurijanyan as the People's Commissar for Military Affairs on December 5, tasked with the formation of a functional Red Army of Soviet Armenia with the assistance of the 11th Army, despite obstacles including poor supply and condition of equipment and armaments.

== Composition ==
Initially, the Armenian Red Army consisted of:

- Three infantry brigades, with three regiments in each brigade and three battalions in each regiment
- Three cavalry regiments, of three squadrons each
- Three artillery regiments, each with three divisions and three batteries in each division
- Five separate batteries
- One sapper battalion
- One radio telegraph division
- One plane
- 10 cars
- 20 trucks
- Two armored vehicles, "Azatamart" and "Musayelyan"

== Battles ==
A nationalist, anti-Bolshevik February Uprising began on 13 February 1921, with Armenian Revolutionary Federation forces quickly capturing Bash Gyarn, Akhtan, Kanaker, and, ultimately on February 18, Yerevan. In response, the Red Army retreated to Artashat. Over the next two months, the Armenian Red Army would continue to engage in hostilities with varying success, fighting in the Daralagyaz, Artashat, Vedi, Khulukhanlu, Aghbash, Charbakh, Shengavit, Etchmiadzin regions. Throughout this, its small dispersed forces consisting of a total of 6883 people, including 3992 in formal military units, as well as 382 horses, 3145 rifles, 83 machine guns, and 14 artillery guns, suffered from shortages of ammunition, food, and supplies.

Despite being separated from the broader Red Army, the Armenian Red Army commander Mikhail Molkochanov successfully engaged both defensive operations and a counterattack. He subsequently established radio communications with the 11th Army, which sent reinforcements and led to the recapture of Yerevan on April 4 from the directions of Kanaker, Shengavit, and Etchmiadzin, causing rebelling ARF forces to retreat to Zangezur. Those last military units would be defeated that summer, leading to a scale-down in the size of the Armenian Red Army. On April 12, on the request of the Soviet 11th Red Army, Turkish troops under the command of Kazim Karabekir Pasha also left Alexandropol.

On 20 November 1921, People's Commissar for Military Affairs Alexander Myasnikyan ordered the reorganisation of the ARR into one brigade of 19,000 personnel, consisting of:

- Two rifle regiments
- Two cavalry regiments
- One separate artillery division
- One mountain artillery battalion of two light and one mountain batteries

On 5 September 1922, Sergo Orjonikidze, a member of the Yegorov Military Revolutionary Council, formed the 76th Armenian Rifle Division on the basis of this Armenian collective brigade. It was renamed to the 76th Voroshilov Mountain Red Rifle Armenian Division in 1935 and became part of the Transcaucasian Military District when the Separate Caucasus Army was reorganised.
