= Alexander Miasnikian =

Armenian Bolshevik revolutionary and statesman (1886–1925)

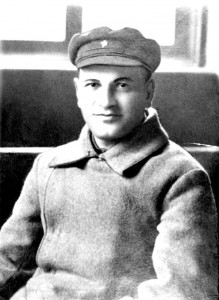

Chairman of the Council of People's Commissars of Armenia
- In office 23 March 1921 – 30 January 1922
- Preceded by: Sarkis Kasyan (as Chairman of the Revolutionary Committee of Armenia)
- Succeeded by: Sargis Lukashin

First Secretary of the Communist Party of Byelorussia
- In office 1918–1919
- Preceded by: position established
- Succeeded by: Vincas Mickevičius-Kapsukas

People's Commissar for Military Affairs of Armenia
- In office 1921–1922
- Preceded by: Avis Nurijanyan
- Succeeded by: Hayk Bzhishkyan

Personal details
- Born: 9 February 1886 Nor Nakhichevan, Don Voisko Oblast, Russian Empire
- Died: 22 March 1925 (aged 39) near Tiflis, Georgian SSR, Soviet Union
- Cause of death: Plane crash
- Party: RSDLP (Bolsheviks) (1904–1918); Russian Communist Party (1918–1925)
- Awards: Order of Saint Anna, Order of Saint Stanislaus two times

Alexander Fyodori Miasnikian or Myasnikov (Note: Armenian: Ալեքսանդր Ֆեոդորի Մյասնիկյան; Russian: Алекса́ндр Фёдорович Мяснико́в. Also spelled Myasnikyan. His patronymic is variously given as Asatur, Astvatsatur, Fyodor and Bogdan.) (28 January [9 February] 1886 – 22 March 1925), also known by his revolutionary nom de guerre Martuni, was an Armenian Bolshevik revolutionary, military leader, and statesman. During the Russian Civil War, he served as First Secretary of the Communist Party of Byelorussia from 1918 to 1919. As the Chairman of the Council of People's Commissars of Armenia from 1921 to 1922, he is credited with rebuilding the Armenian republic in the era of Vladimir Lenin's New Economic Policy (NEP).

== Early life and career ==
Miasnikian was born in the Armenian-populated city of New Nakhichevan (now a part of Rostov-on-Don) to the family of a merchant. He graduated from the faculty of law of Moscow University in 1911. As a student in New Nakhichevan and later in Moscow, Miasnikian was active in underground groups starting in 1901. He took part in the 1905 Russian Revolution and joined the Russian Social Democratic Labour Party in 1906. He was arrested and exiled back to Rostov-on-Don that same year. From 1907 to 1908, he was active in the Bolshevik underground in Baku.

Between 1912 and 1914, Miasnikian worked as an assistant to a lawyer in Moscow while continuing his political activities. After the start of World War I in 1914, he was drafted into the Russian Army. He was a member of an underground party cell in the army and promoted revolutionary ideas among the soldiers.

After the February Revolution of 1917, Miasnikian became a member of the Western Front's military committee, leading its Bolshevik faction together with Mikhail Frunze. He also served as the editor of the Bolshevik newspaper Zvezda in Minsk. He was elected a delegate to the 6th Congress of the Bolshevik Party (August 1917). In September 1917, he was elected chairman of the Northwestern Regional Committee of the Bolshevik Party (the predecessor of the Bolshevik party organization in Byelorussia). After the October Revolution, he was elected chairman the Revolutionary Military Committee of the Northwestern Front. Miasnikian was then elected commander of the Western Front at the soldiers' congress of deputies.

Despite being an active opponent of the idea of a Byelorussian autonomy, in 1918, he was appointed the first chairman of the Communist Party of Byelorussia. From 4–27 February 1919, Miasnikian was chairman of the Central Executive Committee of the Socialist Soviet Republic of Byelorussia that briefly existed in January and February of that year. He was a member of the Central Committee of the Bolshevik Party for the short-lived Lithuanian–Belorussian Soviet Socialist Republic. When Nikolai Krylenko was appointed Supreme Commander in Chief of the Red Army, he appointed Miasnikian as his deputy.

== Leadership in Armenia ==
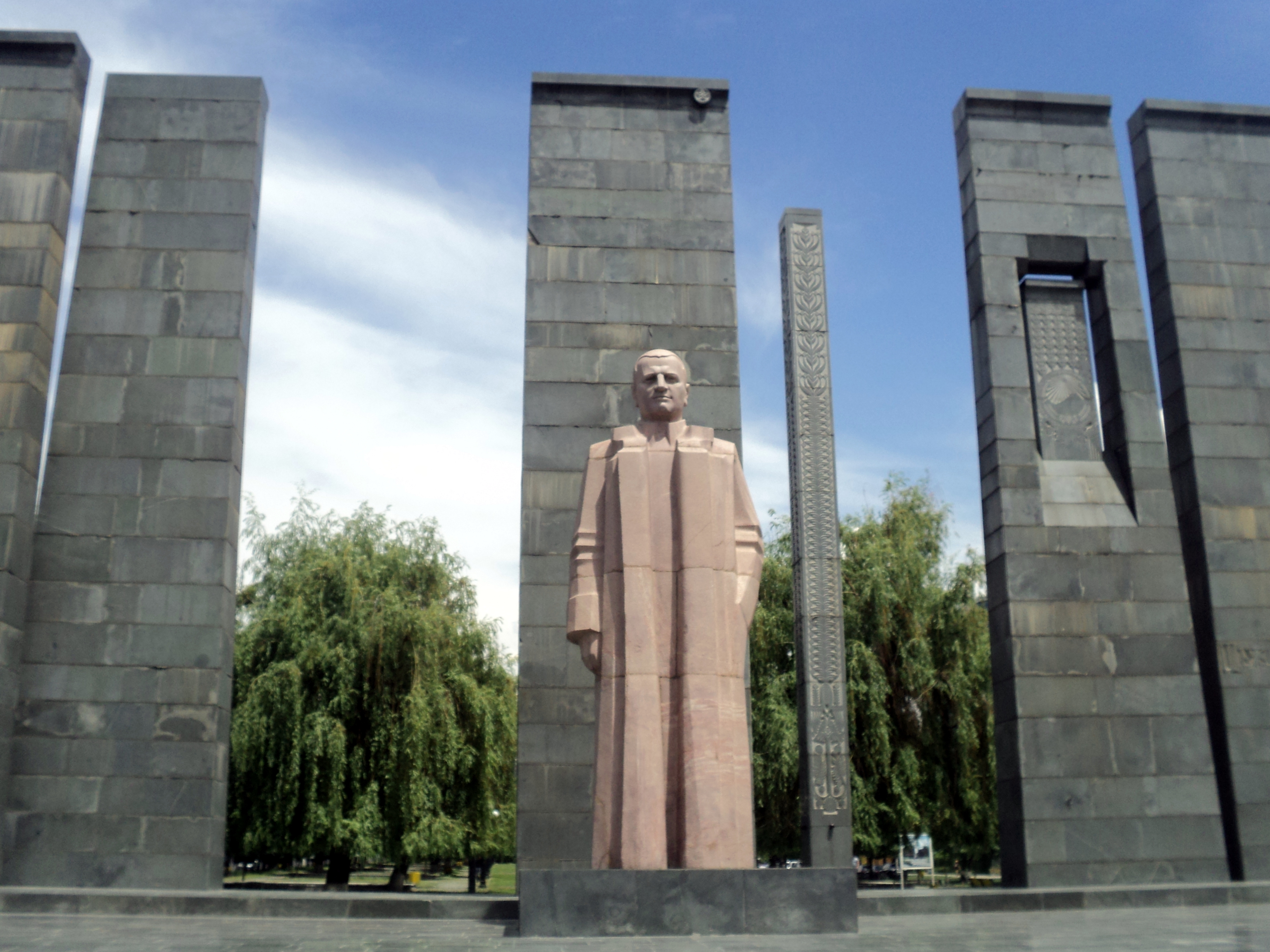
Monument to Miasnikian in Yerevan, sculpted by Ara Shiraz and designed by Jim Torosyan

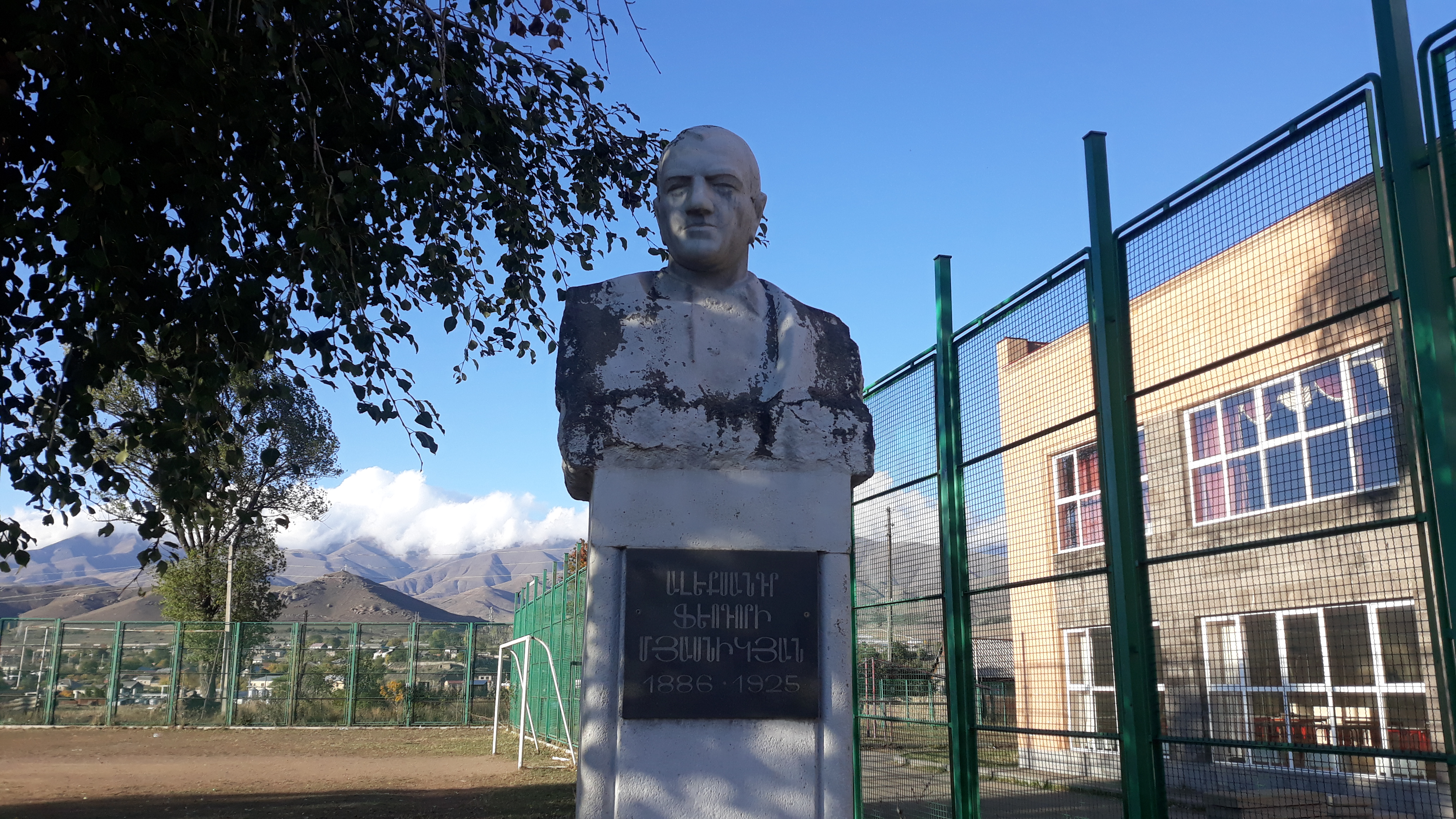
Bust of Miasnikian in Spitak

In March 1921, following the February Uprising where forces of the Armenian Revolutionary Federation briefly overthrew Soviet authority in Armenia, Lenin decided to appoint Miasnikian head of the newly installed government of the Armenian Soviet Socialist Republic. Miasnikian's task, in the era of NEP, was to implement a more moderate policy and one better attuned to Armenian national sensibilities. On his way to Armenia, he delivered Lenin's letter "To the Comrade Communists of Azerbaijan, Georgia, Armenia, Dagestan, and the Mountainous Republic" to the Caucasian Bolshevik leadership in Tiflis, which called on them to exercise moderation and slow down their transition to socialism.

In May 1921, Miasnikian arrived in Yerevan to assume the leadership of the Armenian government. As leader of Soviet Armenia, he became instrumental in the formation of state institutions and the economy of the republic. He initiated active work towards assisting Western Armenian refugees, eradicating illiteracy, and developing local manufacturing and infrastructure. He also encouraged major figures of the Armenian intelligentsia to come to Armenia to assist in the republic's rebuilding, among them Martiros Saryan, Alexander Tamanian, and Hrachia Acharian. Miasnikian maintained close ties with the prominent Armenian writers of the era, such as Yeghishe Charents and Shushanik Kurghinian.

Early in his tenure, Miasnikian was confronted with two urgent issues facing Armenia: the anti-Bolshevik rebellion in the southern region of Syunik (Zangezur) and the question of Artsakh (Mountainous Karabakh), an Armenian-populated region disputed between Soviet Armenia and Soviet Azerbaijan. Miasnikian engaged in negotiations with the rebels in Syunik, offering a number of concessions in return for accepting Soviet authority in Armenia, but on June 3, 1921, the Kavbiuro resolved to suppress the rebellion. The rebels were defeated and fled across the Araks River into Iran on July 15.

The resolution adopted at the Kavbiuro meeting on June 3 (at which Miasnikian was present) included a point which stated that Artsakh should be declared a part of Armenia. On June 12, Miasnikian signed a decree adopted by the Soviet Armenian government which stated that the Revkoms of Armenia and Azerbaijan had agreed that Artsakh was now an "inalienable part of Armenia." However, there was disagreement from the Azerbaijani side, which insisted on delaying the final resolution of the status of Artsakh.

At the Kavbiuro meeting of July 4, 1921, Miasnikian and a majority of members voted to conduct a referendum in majority-Armenian Artsakh and make it part of Armenia. However, the next day, the Kavbiuro revised its decision and adopted a new one whereby Artsakh would become an autonomous region within the Azerbaijan SSR. The Armenian Central Committee unsuccessfully protested the decision. Six months later, Miasnikian told the First Congress of the Armenian Communist Party that Azerbaijan had "threatened to halt kerosene supplies to Armenia if Yerevan did not relinquish its claims to Mountainous Karabakh."

Miasnikian was succeeded as head of government of Soviet Armenia by Sargis Lukashin in January 1922. After the formation of the Transcaucasian SFSR in March 1922, Miasnikian held a number of leading positions in the federation's government, working from Tiflis. He also wrote several works on the theory of Marxism–Leninism, the history of the revolutionary movement, and Armenian literature. He began writing reviews for theater in 1906. His works about Armenian literature include the article "Mikael Nalbandian" and pamphlets on the poetry of Hovhannes Hovhannisyan and Hovhannes Tumanyan. Miasnikian criticized apolitical approaches to literature and the concept of "art for art's sake" in articles like "Philanthropy and its Lackeys" (1912).

== Death ==
Miasnikian was killed in a mysterious plane crash on 22 March 1925, along with Solomon Mogilevsky, Georgi Atarbekov, the pilot and flight engineer. They had been on their way to Sukhumi for a communist conference in Abkhazia. Shortly after taking off from Tiflis, the Junkers F 13 aircraft caught fire. According to eyewitness reports, people were seen jumping to their deaths to escape the burning plane.

The cause of the fire was never established, despite separate investigatory commissions chaired by Lavrentiy Beria (first) and Karl Pauker (second and third). Nothing was found to be wrong with the plane mechanically. Leon Trotsky, who left Sukhumi for the funeral in Tiflis, was suspicious of the cause of the crash. Some suspected that Beria himself had organized it.

== Legacy ==
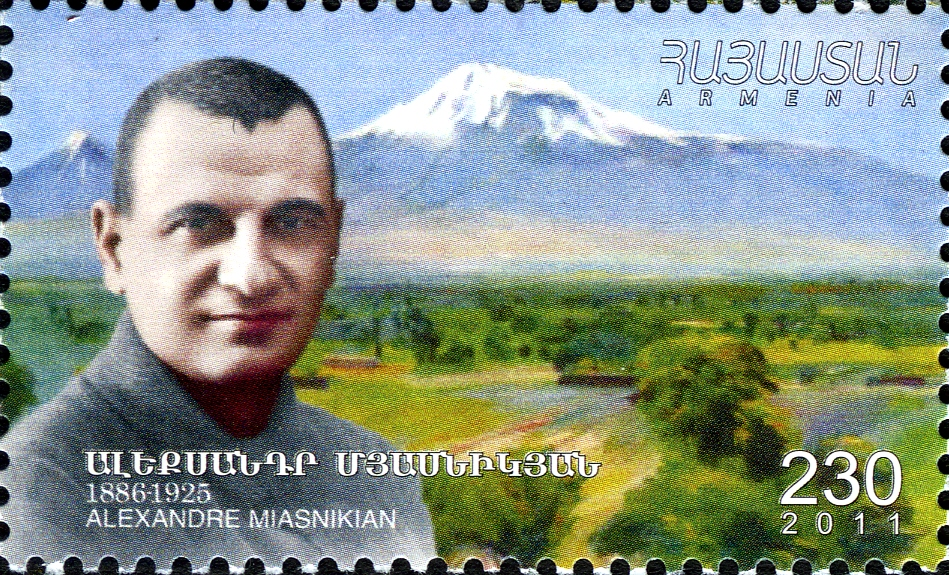
Armenian commemorative stamp of Alexander Miasnikian on the occasion of his 100th birthday, 2012

Fridtjof Nansen once praised the "wise moderation" of Miasnikian's leadership in Soviet Armenia. The poet Charents referred to Miasnikian's presence as "forceful and striking," adding that "not his imposing face alone, but his entire being seemed to be made of bronze, projecting an image of complete self-sufficiency and self-control."

In his March 1954 speech in Yerevan, Anastas Mikoyan called for reviving the memory and legacy of Miasnikian, alongside Charents, Raphael Patkanian, and Raffi, beginning the Khrushchev Thaw in Armenia. Citing Miasnikian's leadership of Armenia during the NEP years, Mikoyan remarked that "the working people of Armenia in particular should keep the bright memory of Aleksandr Myasnikyan sacred in their hearts."

In 1976, a film directed by Frunze Dovlatyan about Miasnikian's life titled Delivery (Yerkunk) was released where Miasnikian is portrayed by Khoren Abrahamyan. In 1980, a monument to Miasnikian, sculpted by Ara Shiraz and designed by Jim Torosyan [hy], was opened in Yerevan. The monument is inscribed with a quote from Charents, praising the statesman. In honor of his activities on behalf of Artsakh, a monument to Miasnikian was also unveiled in Stepanakert in 2014 by the Artsakh Republic. It was destroyed by Azerbaijan's government in 2024.

Several locations within the Soviet Union were named after Miasnikian (including "Martuni", his nom de guerre): In Armenia, a city and two villages (in Gegharkunik and Armavir provinces); In Russia's Rostov Oblast, an Armenian-populated raion (district) is named after him; and until the disestablishment of the Republic of Artsakh, the town of Khojavend and its surrounding province were called Martuni. From 1925 to 1990, the National Library of Armenia was named after Miasnikian.

== Bibliography ==
- Bonch-Bruyevich, Mikhail (1966). From Tsarist General to Red Army Commander. Translated by Vladimir Vezey. Moscow: Progress Publishers.
- Charents, Yeghishe (1985). Across Two Worlds: Selected Prose of Eghishé Charents. Translated by Jack Antreassian; Marzbed Margossian. New York: Ashod Press. ISBN 978-0935102178.
- Galstyan, Siranush (2016). Cinema of Armenia: An Overview. Costa Mesa: Mazda. ISBN 978-1568593029.
- Hovannisian, Richard G. (1996b). The Republic of Armenia. Vol. 4: Between Crescent and Sickle: Partition and Sovietization. Berkeley: University of California Press. ISBN 978-0520088047.
- Kotkin, Stephen (2014). Stalin: Volume I: Paradoxes of Power, 1878-1928 (ePub ed.). Penguin Press. ISBN 978-1594203794.
- Mnatsakanyan, Aramayis (1981). "Մյասնիկյան (Մյասնիկով), Ալեքսանդր Ֆեոդորի". In Hambardzumyan, Viktor (ed.). Soviet Armenian Encyclopedia (in Armenian). Vol. 7. Yerevan: Armenian Academy of Sciences.
- Saparov, Arsène (2015). From Conflict to Autonomy in the Caucasus: The Soviet Union and the Making of Abkhazia, South Ossetia and Nagorno Karabakh. London: Routledge. ISBN 978-1-317-63783-7. OCLC 1124532887.
- Shakarian, Pietro A. (2025). Anastas Mikoyan: An Armenian Reformer in Khrushchev's Kremlin. Bloomington: Indiana University Press. ISBN 978-0253073556.
- Suny, Ronald Grigor (1993). Looking toward Ararat. Bloomington: Indiana University Press. ISBN 978-0253207739.
