= Sargis Hambardzumyan =

Sargis Hаmbardzumyan
- Սարգիս Համբարձումյան

Chairman of the Council of People's Commissars of the Armenian SSR
- In office February 1, 1925 – January 30, 1928
- Preceded by: Sargis Lukashin
- Succeeded by: Sahak Ter-Gabrielyan

Personal details
- Born: 1870 Shushi, Elisabethpol Governorate, Russian Empire
- Died: 1944 (aged 73–74) Moscow, Soviet Union
- Party: RSDLP (Bolsheviks) (1903–1918); Russian Communist Party (1918–1944)

Sargis "Sako" Isahaki Hаmbardzumyan (Armenian: Սարգիս (Սաքո) Իսահակի Համբարձումյան; 1870–1944) was a Soviet Armenian politician and professional revolutionary of the Bolshevik Party.

== Biography ==
Born in Shushi in 1870, he joined the Russian Social Democratic Labour Party in 1903. He participated in revolutionary activities in Moscow from 1903 until 1910, interrupted by a period of exile in Baku. He took part in the December uprising of the 1905 Russian Revolution. In 1909, he graduated from the medical department of Moscow State University, and in 1910 he returned to his hometown of Shushi, where he worked as a doctor. He was imprisoned after the capture of Shushi by Ottoman forces during the Caucasus campaign. After the Sovietization of Azerbaijan, he was released from imprisonment and conducted party and state work in his native Karabakh. In 1921 he became the minister of health of the Armenian SSR. In 1925 he became the head of government of the Armenian SSR. During Sargis Hambardzumyan's tenure the first stage of economic revival of Armenia ended and several hydroelectric stations were built, including two in Yerevan and one in Leninakan. In 1927 the construction of the Dzoraget Hydroelectric Power Station began. Copper mines in Zangezur and copper foundries in Alaverdi were restored. Sargis Hambarzumyan chaired the Soviet Armenian government until 1928. After this he lived and worked in Moscow until his death in 1944.
