= Sargis Lukashin =

Armenian Old Bolshevik and Soviet statesman (1883–1937)

Sergei Lukashin
- Սարգիս Լուկաշին; Сергей Лукашин
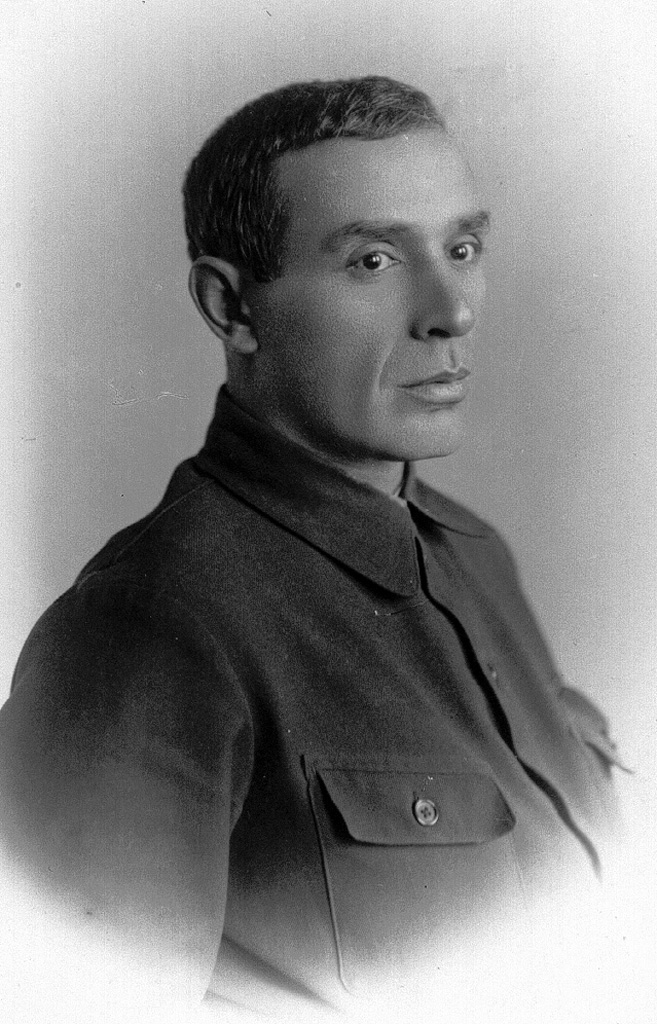
- Lukashin in 1923

Chairman of the Council of People's Commissars of Armenia
- In office 1922–1925
- Preceded by: Alexander Miasnikian
- Succeeded by: Sargis Hambardzumyan

First Secretary of the Communist Party of Armenia
- In office 1921–1922
- Preceded by: Gevorg Alikhanyan
- Succeeded by: Ashot Hovhannisyan

Personal details
- Born: Sargis Srapionyan; 18 (30) December 1883 New Nakhichevan, near Rostov-on-Don, Russian Empire (now Rostov-on-Don, Russian Federation)
- Died: December 11, 1937 (aged 53) Tbilisi, Georgian SSR, Soviet Union
- Party: RSDLP (Bolsheviks) (1906–1918); Russian Communist Party (1918–1937)
- Other political affiliations: Communist Party of Armenia
- Spouse: Ashkhen Abgaryan
- Education: Saint Petersburg Imperial University; Saint Petersburg Polytechnic Institute
- Awards: Order of the Red Banner of Labour (1936)

Sergei Lukyani Lukashin (Armenian: Սարգիս Լուկյանի Լուկաշին; Russian: Сергей Лукьянович Лукашин, born Sargis Srapionyan (Սրապիոնյան); 18 (30) December 1883 – 11 December 1937) was an Armenian Old Bolshevik and Soviet statesman.

== Early life and career ==
Lukashin was born in December 1883 in the Armenian-populated city of New Nakhichevan near Rostov-on-Don in southern Russia. In 1901, he graduated from the Nakhichevan-on-Don Armenian Theological Seminary, where he befriended the future Soviet Armenian statesman and revolutionary Alexander Miasnikian. In 1906, Lukashin moved to Saint Petersburg where he studied law at the Saint Petersburg Imperial University and personally me with Vladimir Lenin in 1907. At first a supporter of the Armenian Social-Democratic Labour Organization, he joined the Bolshevik Party in 1906. In addition to his studies at the Imperial University, Lukashin studied economics at the Saint Petersburg Polytechnic Institute and was arrested several times for revolutionary activity. After graduating from Saint Petersburg Imperial University in 1910, he and his wife fled to Germany and Switzerland.

Lukashin returned to Saint Petersburg in 1910 and worked as an attorney and clerk for the Armenian Church. During World War I, he served in the Imperial Russian Army as a sapper. He participated in the Bolsheviks' armed rebellion in Petrograd during the October Revolution, after which he moved to Rostov-on-Don and fought on the Southern Front of the Russian Civil War. It was during this time that he adopted the nom de guerre Lukashin, which originated from his father's nickname, Lukash. In 1918, Lukashin worked in the Cheka and as the secretary of the Moscow regional bureau of the Bolshevik Party. In 1919 he returned to the Don region and occupied various positions there until 1921.

== Leadership in Armenia ==
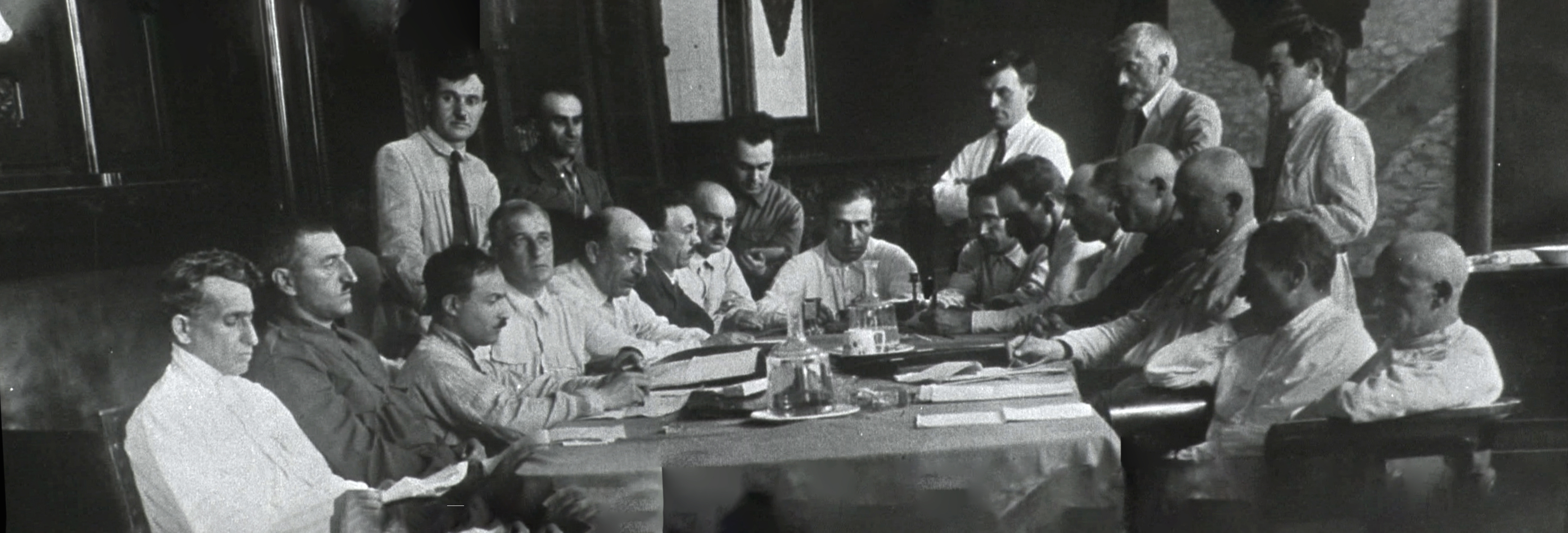
Lukashin leads a meeting of the Soviet Armenian government in 1924, attended by Alexander Tamanian

Working closely with Miasnikian, Lukashin served as one of the early leaders of Soviet Armenia during Lenin's New Economic Policy (NEP). From 1921 to 1922, he was the First Secretary of the Communist Party of Armenia and between 1922 and 1925, he served as the Chairman of the Council of People's Commissars (the equivalent of Prime Minister). Lukashin oversaw the rebuilding of the Armenian economy and the first steps toward the industrialization of the republic, which was suffering from a severe refugee crisis, famine, and disease. Lukashin played a significant role in the development of industries in Kapan, Alaverdi, and Leninakan. He also oversaw the electrification of Armenia, the development of canals and irrigation, and sanatoriums at Dilijan and Arzni. Additionally, he supported Viktor Ambartsumian's studies in Leningrad.

Lukashin was a strong supporter of the Transcaucasian SFSR. From 1925 to 1928, he was Vice Chairman of the Council of People's Commissars of the TSFSR and occupied various ministerial positions. From 1928 to 1937, Lukashin occupied various positions at the all-union level having to do with construction and heavy industry.

== Great Purge and rehabilitation ==
Lukashin was arrested on June 20, 1937 by Lavrentiy Beria's Georgian NKVD, during the Great Purge. Accused of counterrevolutionary activity and association with the Old Bolshevik Alexei Rykov, he was executed on December 11, 1937. He was posthumously rehabilitated during Nikita Khrushchev's Thaw on February 29, 1956. Numerous settlements, streets, and schools in Armenia are named after Lukashin. In cinema, he was portrayed by Armen Ayvazyan [hy] in Frunze Dovlatyan's 1976 film Delivery (Yerkunk), about Miasnikian's efforts to rebuild NEP-era Soviet Armenia.

== See also ==
- Armenian victims of the Great Purge
