= Shushanik Kurghinian =

Armenian poet (1876–1927)

Shushanik Kurghinian Շուշանիկ Կուրղինյան
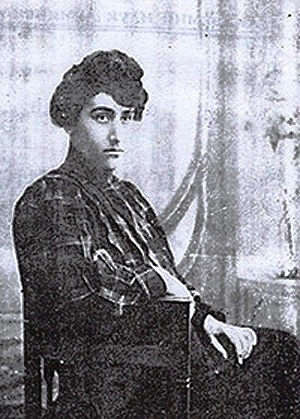
- Born: Shushanik Popoljian; August 18, 1876; Alexandropol, Alexandropol uezd, Erivan Governorate, Russian Empire
- Died: November 24, 1927 (aged 51); Yerevan, Armenian SSR, Soviet Union
- Resting place: Komitas Pantheon
- Occupations: Poet, writer, public activist
- Spouse: Arshak Kurghinian
- Writing career
- Language: Armenian

Shushanik Kurghinian (Armenian: Շուշանիկ Կուրղինյան; née Popoljian; 18 August 1876 – 24 November 1927) was an Armenian writer who became a catalyst in the development of socialist and feminist poetry in Armenian literature. She is described as having "given a voice to the voiceless" and herself saw her role as a poet as "profoundly political".

Her first poem was published in 1899 in Taraz, and in 1900 her first short story appeared in the journal Aghbyur. After founding the first Hunchakian women's political group in Alexandropol, Kurghinian fled to Rostov on Don in order to escape arrests of the tsarist regime. Her first volume of poetry, Ringing of the Dawn, was published in 1907, and one of her poems from this volume, "The Eagle's Love," was translated and included in Alice Stone Blackwell's second anthology Armenian Poems: Rendered into English Verse (1917).

After the Russian Revolution, in 1921 she returned to NEP-era Soviet Armenia where she lived until her death. Throughout her lifetime, Kurghinian cultivated significant relationships with famous members of the Armenian artistic and literary worlds of her time, including Vrtanes Papazian, Avetik Isahakian, Hovhannes Toumanian, Hrand Nazariantz and others.

== Biography ==
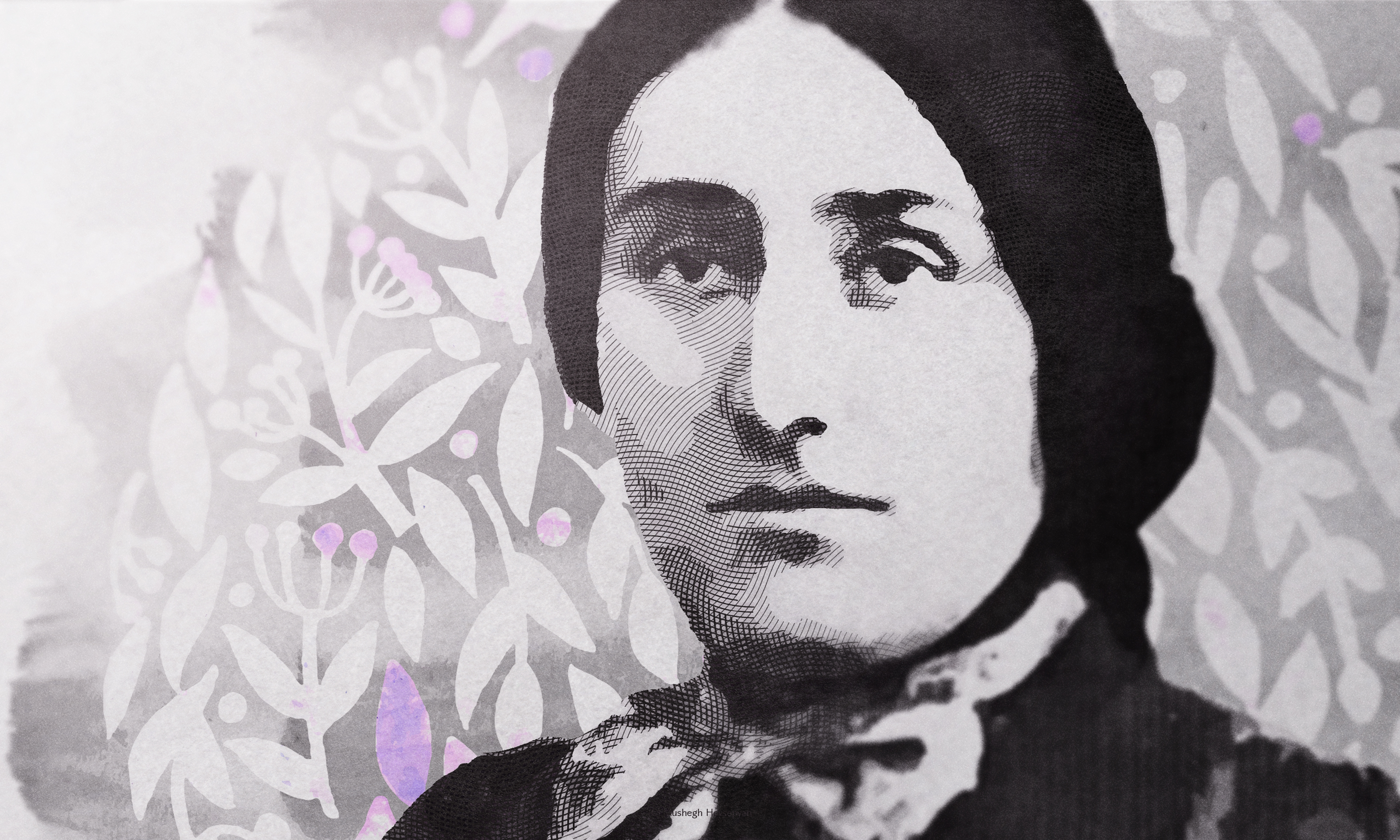
Shushanik Kurghinyan

Shushanik Popoljian was born in Alexandropol (present-day Gyumri), Armenia, into a family of artisans. The young Shushanik benefited from the expansion of Armenian education to the working-class and attended an all-girls' primary school at a local monastery, before attending the Alexandropol Arghutian Girls' School. In 1895, she studied at a Russian gymnasium, which was one of the many schools instituted by Tsar Alexander III to russify the Caucasus and expand the borders of Imperial Russia. At her school Kurghinian's literary ambition was known and encouraged by her teachers.

At age 21, she married Arshak Kurghinian, a member of the socialist underground in the Caucasus. In 1903, she escape arrests of the tsarist regime by moving to Rostov on Don with her two children, while Arshak stayed in Alexandropol. Experiencing utmost hardship and poverty, Kurghinian immersed herself in the Russian revolutionary milieu and some of her most powerfully charged poetry was written between 1907 and 1909, during the years of her affiliation with Rostov's proletarian underground.

Arshaluysi ghoghanjner (Ringing of the Dawn), her first book of poetry was published in Nor Nakhijevan in 1907. It was a direct response to the Russian Revolution of 1905 and was published with the assistance of her friend Alexander Miasnikian. Kurghinian's second volume was heavily criticized and rejected by tsarist censorship. From the late 1910s to the October Revolution, she continued to write and participate in social projects, but her activities were curtailed by fragile health. In 1921, the year after the Sovietization of Armenia, she moved back to Alexandropol, her native city.

== Final years, death, and legacy ==
In 1925, Kurghinian traveled to Kharkov and Moscow for medical treatment and returned home disappointed. In 1926, after the Leninakan (Alexandropol) earthquake, she settled in Yerevan, where she was welcomed with great enthusiasm by literary circles. Due to health complications, Kurghinian died, aged 51, in Yerevan on 24 November 1927. She was buried in the Komitas Pantheon.

Kurghinian is considered one of the founders of feminist and proletarian literature in Armenian. She was portrayed by Nona Petrosyan [hy] in Frunze Dovlatyan's 1976 film Delivery (Yerkunk), about Miasnikian's efforts to rebuild NEP-era Soviet Armenia.

== Quotations ==
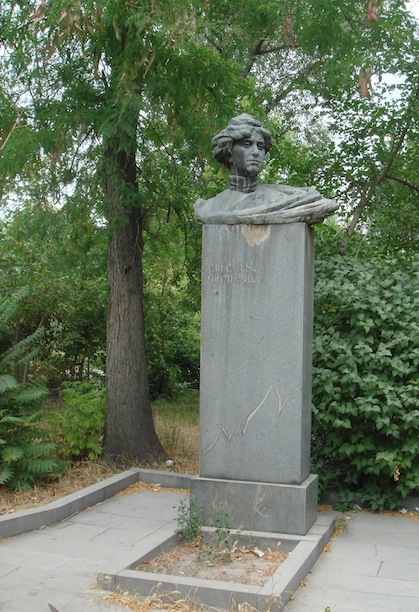
Shushanik Kurghinian's memorial at the Komitas Pantheon-Park

=== I Wanted to Sing ===
I wanted to sing: they told me I could not,

I wove my own songs: quiet, you are a girl!
But when in this troubled world
an elegy I became,
I spoke to the hearts of many.
The more I sang:
the sooner she'll get tired, they said.
The louder I sang:
the faster her voice will fail.

But I kept singing endlessly,
that's when they started to cajole. (1907)

== Bibliography ==
=== Works by Kurghinian ===
- Արշալույսի ղօղանջներ (Arshaluysi ghoghanjner; Bells of the Dawn). Nor Nakhijevan, 1907.
- Երկերի ժողովածու (Yerkeri zhoghovatsu; Collected Works). Yerevan, 1947.
- Բանաստեղծություններ (Banasteghtsutyunner; Poems). Yerevan: "Hayastan" Publication, 1971.
- I Want to Live: Poems of Shushanik Kurghinian. Shushan Avagyan (trans.), Susan Barba and Victoria Rowe (eds.), Watertown, MA: AIWA Press, 2005.

=== Works on Kurghinian ===
- Bakhshi Ishkhanian, The Concept of Work and the Worker in the Poetry of Ada Negri, Hakob Hakobian and Shushanik Kurghinian. Nor Nakhijevan, 1909.
- Hovhannes Ghazarian, Shushanik Kurghinian. Yerevan: National Academy of Sciences, 1955.
