= Khoren Abrahamyan =

Armenian actor and director

Khoren Abrahamyan PAA
- Խորեն Աբրահամյան
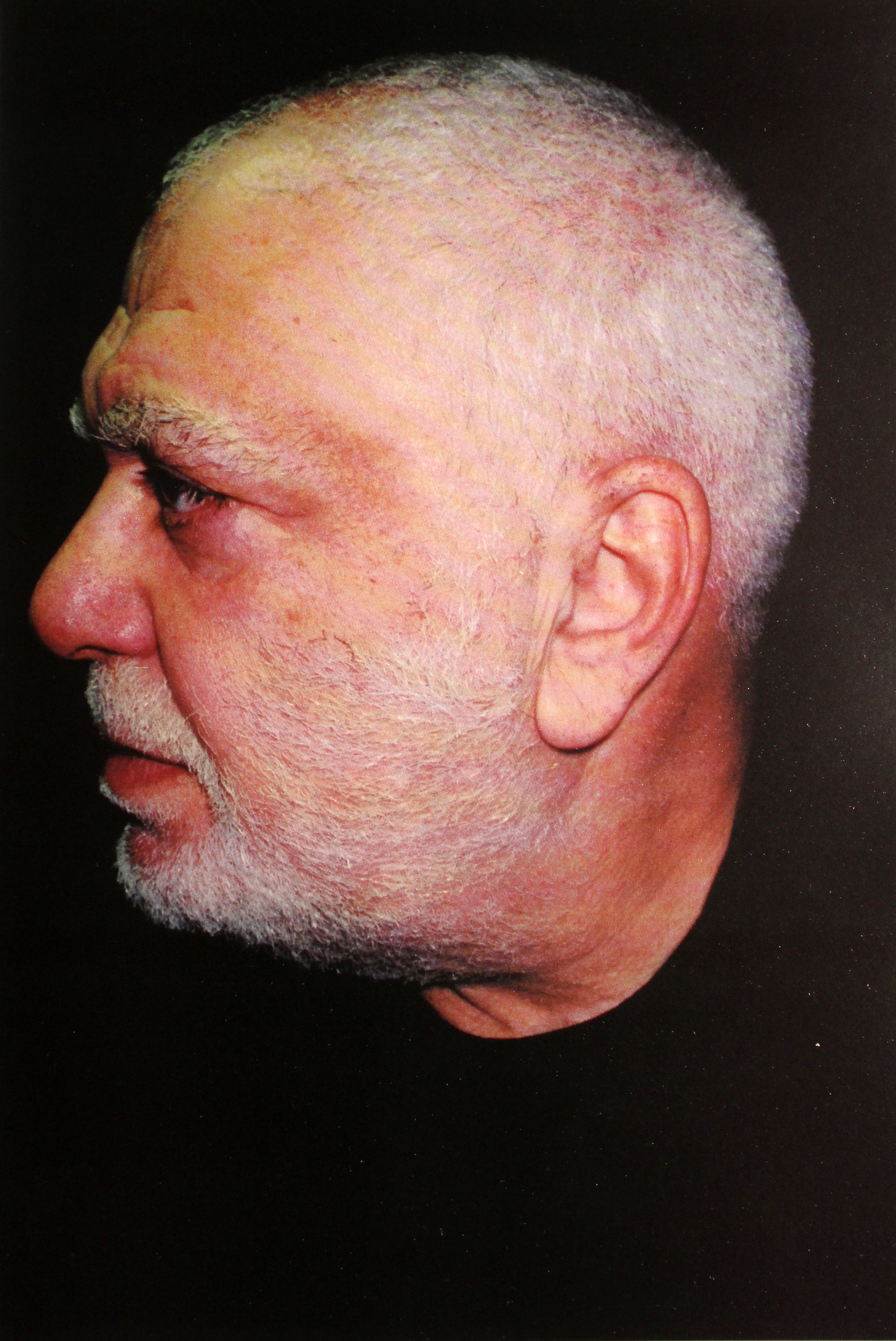
- Born: April 1, 1930; Yerevan, Armenian SSR, Soviet Union
- Died: December 10, 2004 (aged 74); Yerevan, Armenia
- Resting place: Komitas Pantheon
- Occupations: Actor, director

Khoren Babkeni Abrahamyan (Note: Armenian: Խորեն Բաբկենի Աբրահամյան, romanized: Xoren Babkeni Abrahamyan) (April 1, 1930 – December 10, 2004) was an Armenian actor and director. Abrahamyan was honored with the title People's Artist of the Armenian SSR in 1969 and People's Artist of the USSR in 1980. He was also awarded the State Prize of the Armenian SSR in 1971 and 1988.

== Life and career ==
He studied at the Yerevan Institute of Theater and Fine Arts and graduated in 1951. Since 1951 worked at Sundukyan State Academic Theatre of Yerevan as and actor. In 1980, he was appointed its executive director. As a student, Abramyan played several small parts in movies, including Hamo Bek-Nazaryan’s kolkhoz musical The Girl from Ararat Valley (1949), as well as in Russian productions such as Aleksandr Rou’s children’s film The Secret of the Mountain Lake (1954), Mikhail Kalatozov’s drama about the cultivation of untilled soil in the steppes of Kazakhstan The First Echelon (1956), and Aleksandr Zarkhi’s industrial construction tale The Height (1957). More significant roles included Arsen in The Song of First Love (1958) and Armen in Grigory Melik-Avakyan’s psychological drama The Heart of a Mother (1958). Abrahamyan gained recognition with his performance as Gevork in the Civil War drama The Brothers Saroyan (1968), which he also co-directed, and as the shepherd Pavle in Henrik Malyan’s We and Our Mountains (1970) from Hrant Matevosyan’s well-known novel. He played the lead, the compassionate archivist Armen Abramyan, in Frunze Dovlatyan’s A Chronicle of Yerevan Days (1974). In demand actor for Armenian cinema in the 1970s, Abramyan also portrayed historical characters, among them the Bolshevik Armenian statesman Alexander Miasnikian in Dovlatyan's Delivery (1976) and Ter-Avetis in Edmond Keosayan’s 18th-century epic The Star of Hope (1979). He also played Sisakyan in the drama about terminal illness Live Long (1980). Abramyan’s filmography consisted of roles in adventure pictures as well as contemporary social drama, comedy, and thrillers.

Some other movies by Abrahamyan are Lord as Rostom, We and Our Mountains as Pavle, The Chronicle of Yerevan Days, Travail as Myasnikyan and Hope Star as The Avedis.

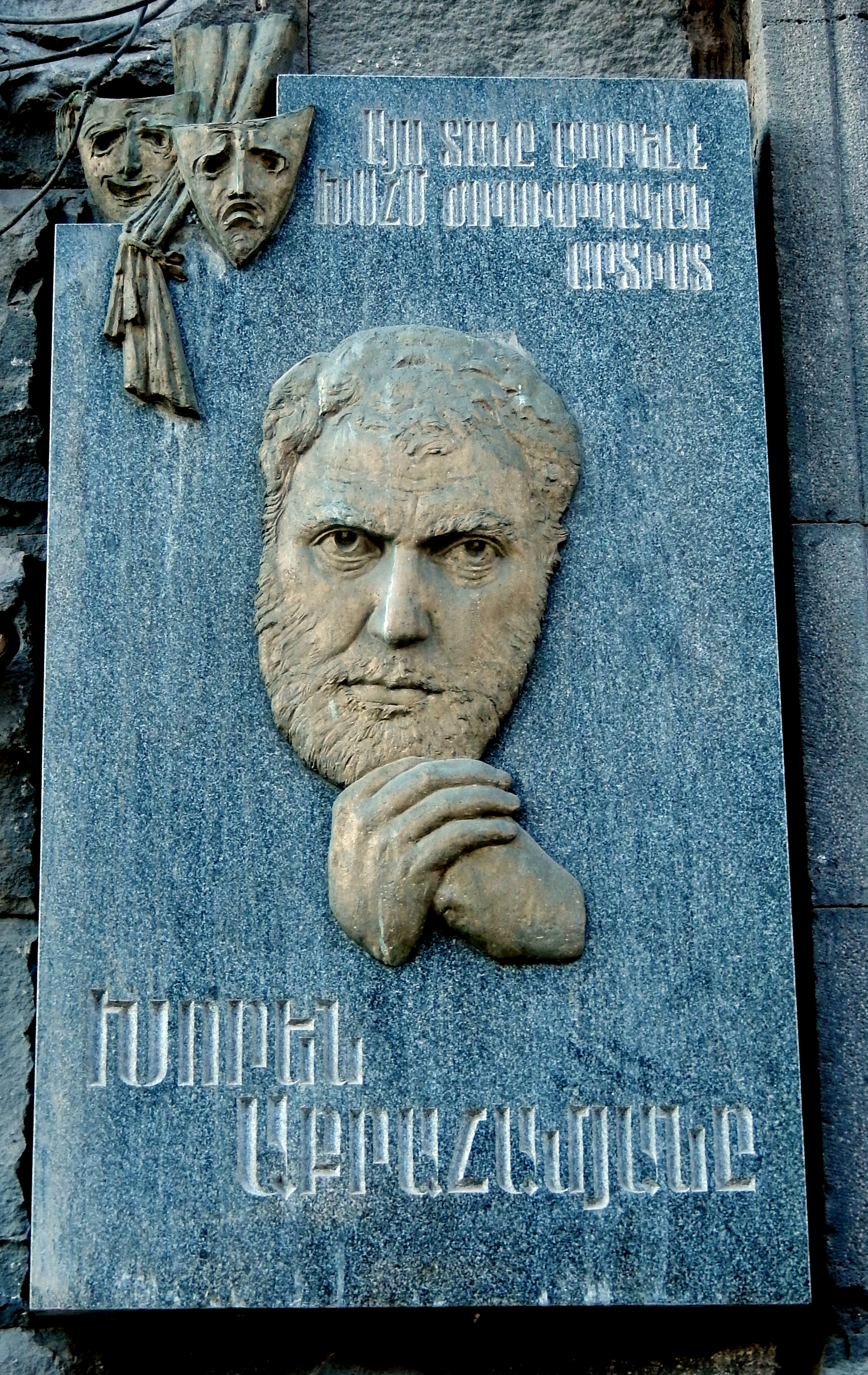
Knoren Abrahamyan's plaque in Yerevan

Khoren Abrahamyan is buried at Komitas Pantheon which is located in the city center of Yerevan.

== Personal life ==
Khoren Abrahamyan's first wife was People's Artist of Armenia actress Lyusya Hovhannisyan, second wife was actress Gohar Galstyan.

His children are Babken Abrahamyan, Tamar Abrahamyan, and Aram Abrahamyan (an actor, from his second marriage).

His grandchildren are Khoren Abrahamyan (designer and businessman), Jemma Abrahamyan (musician), Lusine Abrahamyan (actress), Khoren Levonyan, and Arsen Levonyan (actor).

In 2020, 50-year-old Latvian singer and DJ Khoren Stalbe stated in an interview that he was the extramarital son of Khoren Abrahamyan.
