= Haghtanak =

Haghtanak may refer to two different towns in Armenia:

- Haghtanak, Tavush, in Tavush Province in northeastern Armenia;
- Haghtanak, Yerevan, near the Armenian capital, Yerevan.
