= Delivery (1976 film) =

- Promotional poster
- Երկունք (Armenian)
- Directed by: Frunze Dovlatyan
- Written by: Armen Zurabov
- Starring: Khoren Abrahamyan
- Cinematography: Albert Yavuryan
- Music by: Martin Vardazaryan
- Production company: Armenfilm
- Distributed by: Armenfilm
- Release date: 1976
- Running time: 142 minutes
- Country: Soviet Union
- Languages: Armenian; Russian

Delivery, also known as The Birth (Armenian: Երկունք, romanized: Yerkunq, Russian: Рождение, romanized: Rozhdeniye), is a 1976 Soviet Armenian biographical and epic film, directed by Frunze Dovlatyan. The film is about the Armenian Bolshevik revolutionary and statesman Alexander Miasnikian and his role in rebuilding Soviet Armenia during Vladimir Lenin's New Economic Policy (NEP).

== Cast ==
- Khoren Abrahamyan – Alexander Miasnikian
- Armen Ayvazyan – Sargis Lukashin
- Mihran Kechoghlyan – Poghos Makintsyan
- Harutyun Fodulyan – Avis Nurijanyan
- Mayis Karagezyan – Aramais Erzinkyan
- A. Aristakesyan – Askanaz Mravyan
- Levon Kocharyan – Kosti Hambardzumyan
- V. Sepetchyan – Alexander Bekzadyan
- Tadeos Asoyan – Artashes Karinyan
- Karlos Martirosyan – Shavarsh Amirkhanyan
- Vakhtang Mikhelidze – Sergo Ordzhonikidze
- Sos Sargsyan – Nikita Kara Murza
- Azat Gasparyan – Yeghishe Charents
- Tamar Hovhannisyan – Arpenik Charents
- Hrant Sargsyan – Martiros Saryan
- Nona Petrosyan – Shushanik Kurghinian
- Sofik Sargsyan – Serik Davtyan
- Karen Jhangiryan – Simon Pirumov
- Levon Nersisyan – Osik Bek-Pirumov
- Yekaterina Gradova – Ksenia
- Vera Alentova – Olenina
- Yevgeny Steblov – Zhuravlev
- Emma Vardanyan – Susanna
- Shake Tukhmanyan – Anushik
- Edgar Elbakyan, Yuri Amiryan – Migrants
