= 76th Rifle Division =

- Active: 5 September 1922 – 1942; 1943–1945
- Country: Soviet Union
- Branch: Red Army
- Type: Rifle Division
- Role: Tactical attack and defense combat operations
- Size: ca. 5–7,000 men 50–100 guns and mortars
- Engagements: First Battle of Kharkov; Battle of Stalingrad; Operation Uranus
- Decorations: Order of the Red Banner (1st and 2nd formations); Order of Suvorov (2nd formation)
- Battle honours: K. Y. Voroshilov (1st formation); Yelnya (2nd formation); Warsaw (2nd formation)

The 76th Rifle Division was a Red Army infantry division, formed twice. The division was formed in 1922 and was known also as the 76th Armenian Mountain Division. It was a Soviet infantry fighting unit of the Red Army that fought on the Eastern Front during the Second World War. The 76th was made up primarily of Armenians from the newly established Soviet Socialist Republic of Armenia, but also included among its ranks several different nationalities. The division became the 51st Guards Rifle Division on 23 November 1942 for its actions in Operation Uranus.

The division was reformed in 1943 from a rifle brigade. The division's second formation was disbanded in the summer of 1945.

== Interwar period ==
The division was originally formed as the Armenian Rifle Division by an order of the Separate Caucasus Army on 5 September 1922 from the Consolidated Armenian Brigade, which had itself been formed from the Armenian Red Army on 18 November 1921, after the Red Army invasion of Armenia. The division was part of the Separate Caucasus Army.

The 76th was led by several non-Armenian commanders including Major Generals S. V. Chernikov, E. F. Pryakhin, K. E. Goryunov, N. E. Kaladzen, N. T. Tavarkiladze (the latter two were ethnic Georgians), Colonel G. G. Voronin, and subordinate commanders A. P. Melik-Shahnazaryan, H. T. Atoyan (the latter two being Armenians). Instruction was carried out in Armenian and the unit published a military newspaper, The Red Soldier, and a newsletter The Red Fighting Man (both in Armenian). During the Second World War, a third paper, Voroshilovets, under the aegis of Armenian novelist Hrachya Kochar, began publication in Russian.

The division was reorganized as the Armenian Mountain Rifle Division in 1931. In 1935, the division became part of the Transcaucasian Military District when the Separate Caucasus Army was reorganized. On 2 December of that year, the division was named after Soviet Central Committee member (and later Marshal of the Soviet Union) Kliment Voroshilov. On 21 May 1936 it was redesignated as the 76th Armenian Mountain Rifle Division when the Red Army standardized its numbering system. The division was awarded the Order of the Red Banner on 29 May in commemoration of its fifteenth anniversary. In 1938, soldiers of other Soviet nationalities began to enter the ranks of the division, though it remained in the Armenian SSR and retained its flag, its number, and traditions. On 16 July 1940, the division's Armenian designation was removed when the Red Army officially converted national formations into regular units.

== The Second World War ==
=== Iran ===
In the summer of 1941, Nazi Germany invaded the Soviet Union and drove into the large landmass of Russia and Ukraine on three fronts. The southernmost drove through the Caucasus with the objective of capturing the petroleum fields and reserves in Baku, Azerbaijan. By autumn, the German Wehrmacht had pushed far into the regions and was nearing the outlet of the northern Caucasus. In order to prevent a possible link up between Iran, whose leader Reza Shah Pahlavi harbored pro-German leanings, the Allies launched a joint mission to invade and occupy the country. The 76th Division, as part of the 47th Army of the Transcaucasian Front, crossed the Araks River in August at the border town of Julfa, Nakhichevan and settled in the northern Iranian city of Tabriz.

=== Ukraine, Stalingrad, Don ===
In September, the 76th was relocated to the North Caucasus in an attempt to halt the advance towards Rostov-on-Don of the German Army Group South. It fought in the Battle of Rostov in November, which temporarily retook the city and pushed Army Group South back to the Mius River. On 9 December, the 76th Mountain Rifle Division was redesignated as the 76th Rifle Division, part of the Southwestern Front's 38th Army. It was transferred to the 21st Army in May 1942.

With Iran pacified, in September 1941 the division was sent to Ukraine in September and incorporated into the 38th Army. It took part in major fighting in Poltava, Kharkiv and Vovchansk during the First Battle of Kharkov. In February 1942, the division advanced westward and was reassigned and integrated into the 21st Army. In May 1942, the Voroshilov Division was once more on the offensive and advanced toward the Donets River. where it confronted the entrenched German Army Group South. Despite suffering heavy casualties, the division was able to cross the riverbank, and retake a line of towns straddling the Russian-Ukrainian border: Grafovka, Nekhotevka, Shamino and Arkhangelskoye.

In June 1942, the 76th helped close a gap between the 21st and 38th Armies and halt German counter-offensives at Surkovo, Gavrilov-Yam and Pesyano. In July 1942, the division was sent to Stalingrad. After taking part in fighting there until October, it was ordered to weaken Army Group South's defensive lines near the Don River. It overran its lines at the railway terminus in Kletskaya, a feat which earned it the status of a Guards unit (23 November 1942) and subsequent reorganization as the 51st Guards Rifle Division.

=== Second Formation ===
The division was reformed in the Tula area on 20 April 1943 from the 87th Rifle Brigade. The division's final titles were 76th Yelnya-Warsaw Red Banner Order of Suvorov Rifle Division. The division was disbanded "in place" during the summer of 1945 with the Group of Soviet Forces in Germany.

== See also ==
- Soviet 89th "Tamanyan" Rifle Division
- Sassuntsi-Davit Tank Regiment
