= Martuni (village) =

Village in Gegharkunik, Armenia

Martuni Մարտունի
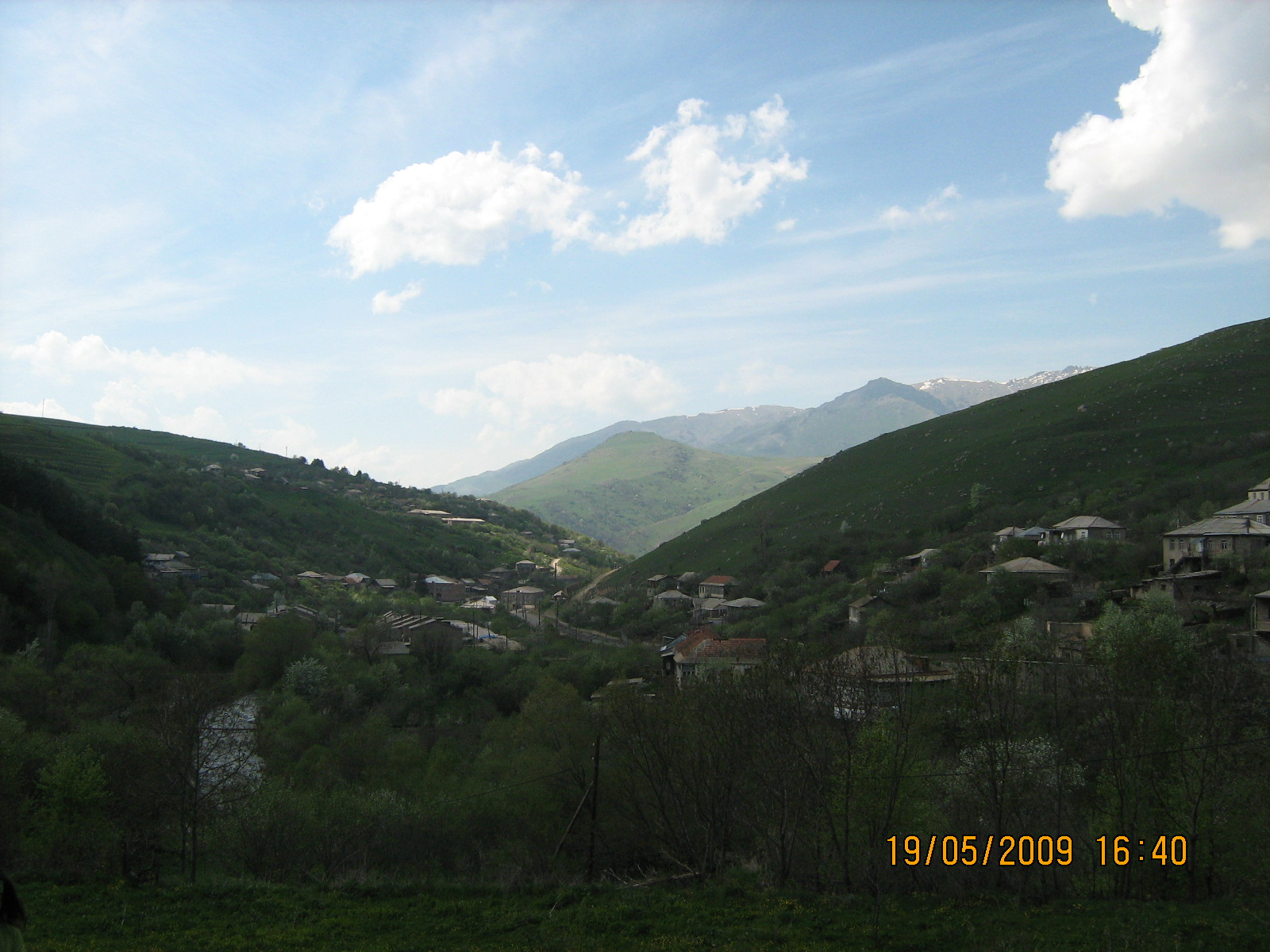
- View of Martuni village

- Location within Armenia Location within Gegharkunik
- Coordinates: 40°40′01″N 45°15′16″E
- Country: Armenia
- Province: Gegharkunik
- Municipality: Chambarak
- Founded: 1921

Population (2011)
  - Total: 500
- Time zone: UTC+4 (AMT)

Martuni (Armenian: Մարտունի) is a village in the Chambarak Municipality of the Gegharkunik Province of Armenia.

== Etymology ==
The village is named in honor of Alexander Miasnikian, the first Soviet premier of Armenia, whose nom de guerre was "Martuni".

== History ==
There are medieval forts and the 10th-century castle of Aghjaghala nearby. The first inhabitants of the community were survivors of the Armenian genocide (Mets Yeghern), mostly from Van, Alashkert, Kars and Sasun.

== Development program ==
In 2014, a three-year development program was initiated in Martuni, with different organizations working with developing infrastructure, education, and health in the village. Martuni was chosen for the project as it was first settled by survivors of the Armenian genocide in 1915, and the project was part of the commemoration of the centennial of the genocide.

== Notable people ==
Artur Miranyan, professional football player and member of the Armenian national football team
