= Hello, That's Me! =

1966 film

Hello, That's Me! (Բարև, ես եմ)
- Directed by: Frunze Dovlatyan
- Written by: Arnold Agababov
- Starring: Armen Dzhigarkhanyan
- Cinematography: Albert Yavuryan
- Edited by: G. Miloserdova
- Production company: Armenfilm
- Release date: 1966
- Running time: 137 minutes
- Country: Soviet Union
- Languages: Armenian, Russian

Hello, That's Me! (Armenian: Բարև, ես եմ, romanized: Barev, yes em, Russian: Здравствуй, это я!, romanized: Zdravstvuy, eto ya!) is a 1966 Armenian romantic drama film directed by Frunze Dovlatyan. It was entered into the 1966 Cannes Film Festival, nominated for the Palme d'Or and awarded the State Prize of Armenia in 1967. The film is based on Artem Alikhanian's biography.

== Plot ==
Artyom Manvelyan is a famous physicist and founder of a cosmology laboratory in Aragats. With loyalty and gentleness, he keeps alive the memories of the World War period, lost love and his surviving friends.

== Cast ==
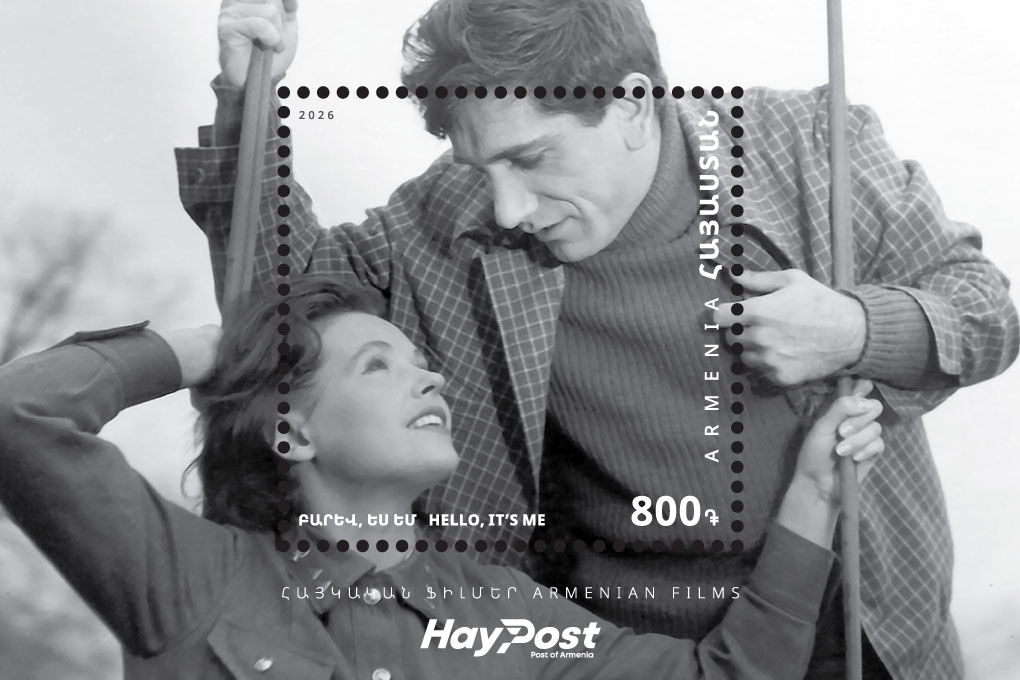
Dzhigarkhanyan and Fateyeva in Hello, That's Me 2026! on a 2026 stamp sheet of Armenia

- Armen Dzhigarkhanyan as Artyom Manvelyan
- Rolan Bykov as Oleg Ponomaryov
- Natalya Fateyeva as Lyusya
- Margarita Terekhova as Tanya
- Luchana Babichkova as Irina Pavlovna
- Frunze Dovlatyan as Zaryan
- Galya Novents as Nazi
- Georgi Tusuzov as Aharon Izrailevich
- Aleksei Bakhar as Stepfather
- Natalya Vorobyova as Tanya in childhood (as Natasha Vorobyova)
- Martyn Vartazaryan (as Martin Vardazaryan)

== Production ==
Arnold Aghababov, who graduated from the Yuri Bleiman Studio of the High Courses for Scriptwriters and Film Directors, produced the film's script as his diploma work. Margarita Terekhova made her acting debut in the film.

== Reception ==
Alexander Rudenko, writing for Soviet Life, identified Hello, That's Me! as exemplifying the "poetic trend" in Soviet cinema, as compared with the "intellectual trend" exemplified by Nine Days in One Year. In contrast to the "series of masterly engravings" found in Nine Days of One Year, Rudenko compared Hello, That's Me! to "a canvas with blurred outlines traced with a light brush" and particularly praised Margarita Terekhova's breakout performance.

Upon its 2021 re-release, Peter Bradshaw reviewed the film for The Guardian, awarding it four out of five stars and describing it as an "intriguing and mysterious romantic drama." The film was screened in 2023 at Cannes in its "Classics" section. Its original runtime for its 1966 showing at Cannes had been shortened to 2 hours; in 2023, the full restored film was shown with both English and French subtitles. Serge Avédikian, in a 2023 retrospective for Cannes, praised the "metaphysical dimension" of Hello, That’s Me!, comparing Dovlatyan's approach to the French New Wave.

== See also ==
- List of Armenian films
