= Komitas Pantheon =

Cemetery in Yerevan, Armenia

Komitas Park and Pantheon
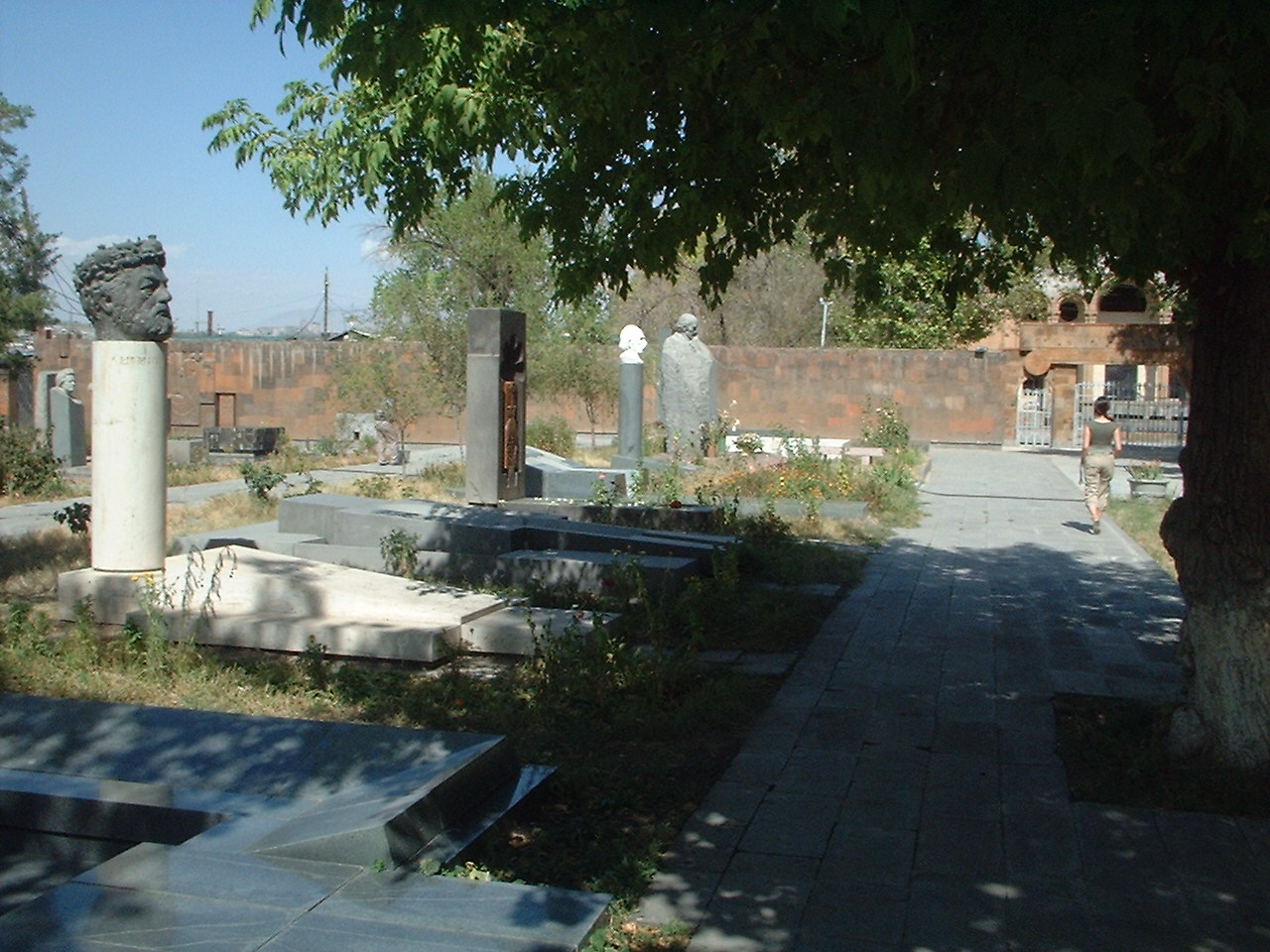
- Interactive map of Komitas Park and Pantheon

Details
- Established: 1936
- Location: Arshakuniats Avenue, Shengavit, Yerevan, Armenia
- Coordinates: 40.161728°N 44.50185°E
- Type: private
- No. of graves: 60
- Website: Komitas Pantheon

Komitas Park and Pantheon (Armenian: Կոմիտասի անվան զբոսայգի և պանթեոն) is located in Yerevan's Shengavit District, on the right side of the main Arshakunyats Avenue, in Armenia. It was formed in 1936 after the demolition of the Mler cemetery and its historic chapel.

Many outstanding figures of Armenia's artistic world are buried here, including Komitas (1869–1935), the founder of modern Armenian national music, for whom it is named.

== Notable interments ==
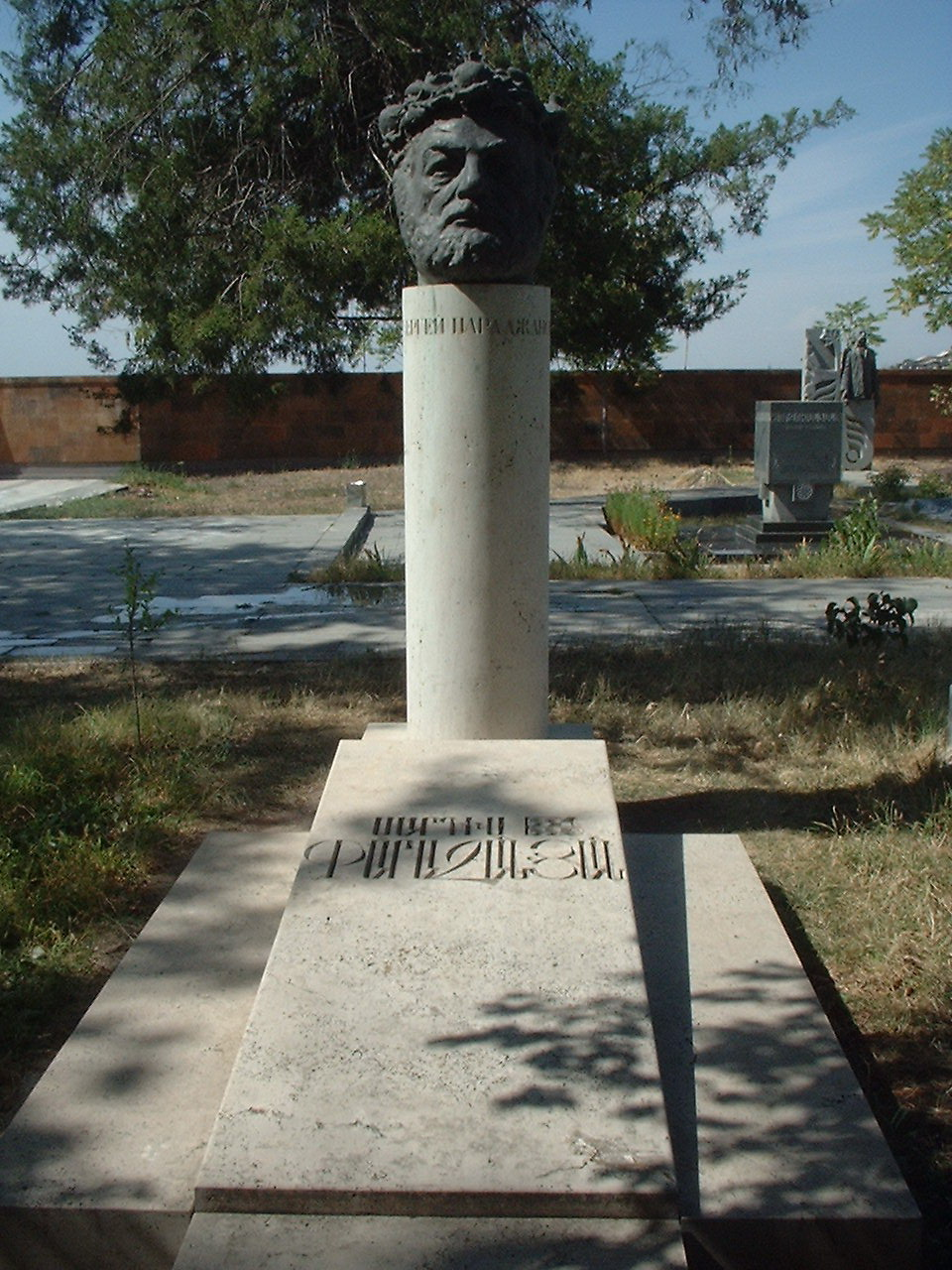
The grave of Sergei Parajanov

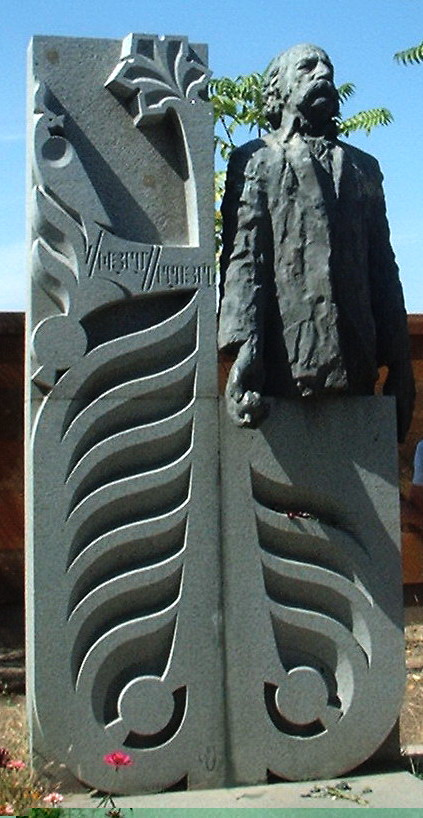
The grave of William Saroyan

There are 60 burials at the Komitas Pantheon. Below is the list of some of the more notable burials:

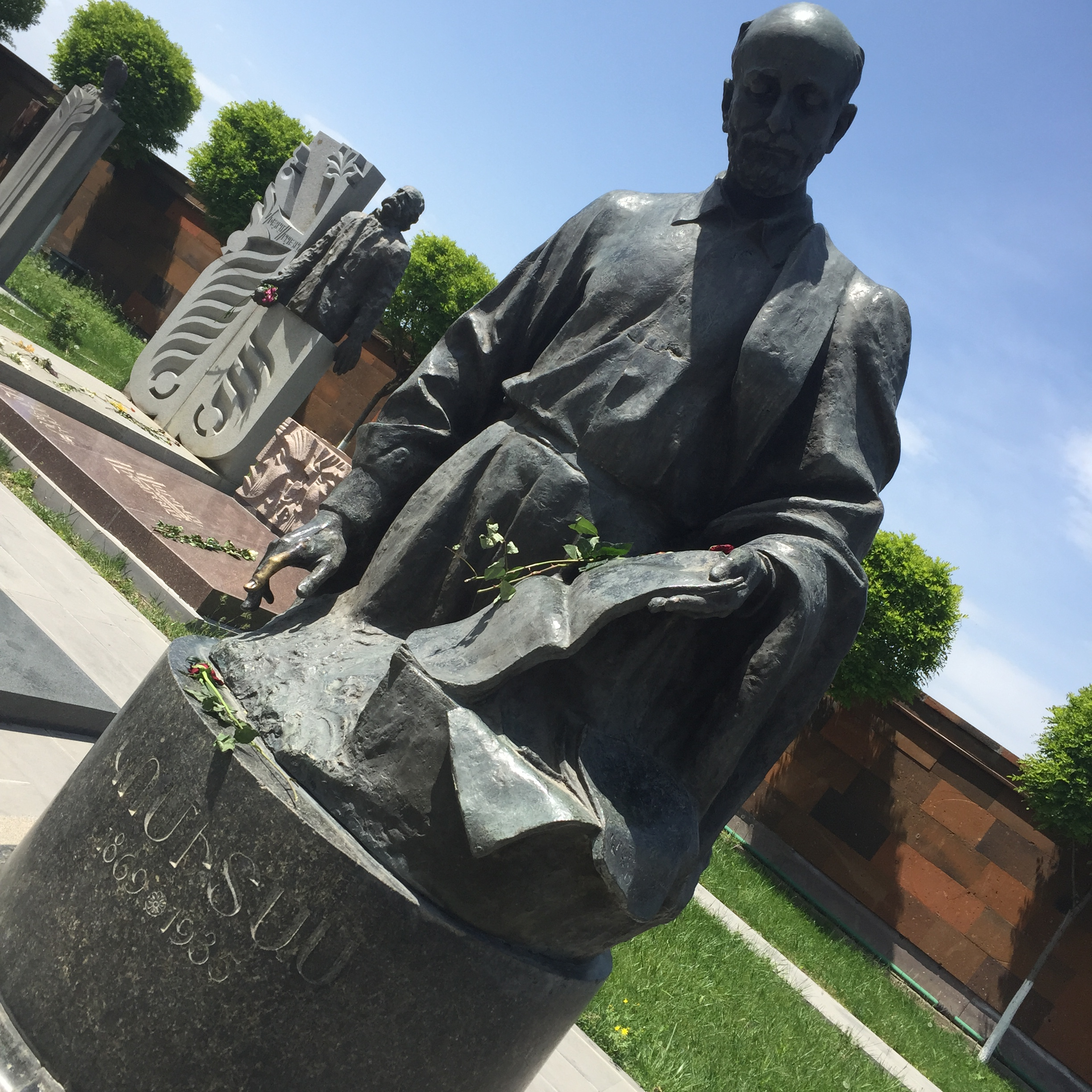
Komitas' tombstone in Yerevan's Komitas Pantheon

Name	Date	Occupation
Vardan Ajemian	1905–1977	theatrical director and actor
Mariam Aslamazian	1907–2006	painter
Vahagn Davtyan (see image)	1922–1996	writer
Hovhannes Hovhannisyan	1864–1929	poet, translator, educator
Karen Demirchyan	1932–1999	politician
Gegham Grigoryan	1951–2016	opera singer
Avetik Isahakyan	1875–1957	lyric poet, writer
Silva Kaputikyan	1919–2006	poet
Aram Khachaturian	1903–1978	composer
Sero Khanzadyan	1915–1998	writer
Atabek Khnkoyan	1870–1935	writer
Komitas	1869–1935	priest, composer, singer
Shushanik Kurghinian (in adjoining park)	1876–1927	poet
Romanos Melikian	1883–1935	composer
Mher Mkrtchyan	1930–1993	actor
Hrachia Nersisyan	1895–1961	film actor
Vrtanes Papazian	1866–1920	writer, political and cultural activist
Sergei Parajanov	1924–1990	film director and artist
Hamo Sahyan	1914–1993	poet and translator
Sos Sargsyan	1929-2013	actor
William Saroyan	1908–1981	dramatist and author
Martiros Saryan	1880–1972	painter
Hovhannes Shiraz	1915–1984	poet
Alexander Shirvanzade	1858–1935	playwright and novelist
Alexander Tamanian	1878–1936	neoclassical architect
Vahan Terian (cenotaph)	1885–1920	poet, lyrist and public activist
Bedros Tourian (only the skull)	1851–1872	poet
Stepan Zoryan	1889–1967	writer

== See also ==
- History of Yerevan
- Armenian Pantheon of Tbilisi
