= Hovhannes Hovhannisyan =

Armenian poet and translator (1864–1929)

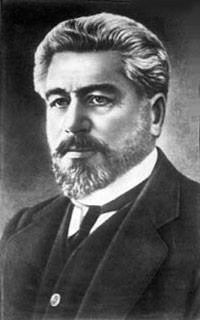
- Born: 26 April 1864; Vagharshapat, Erivan Governorate, Russian Empire
- Died: 29 September 1929 (aged 65); Yerevan, Armenian SSR, Soviet Union
- Resting place: Komitas Pantheon
- Occupations: Writer, translator, teacher

Hovhannes Hovhannisyan (Armenian: Հովհաննես Հովհաննիսյան; (Note: Traditional Armenian orthography: Յովհաննէս Յովհաննիսեան. In Russian, he is known as Ioannes Ioannisyan (Иоаннес Иоаннисян).) 26 April [O.S. 14 April] 1864 – 29 September 1929) was an Armenian poet, translator and educator. While he was not very prolific, his melancholic poetry has been praised for its lyrical quality and form and was influential for subsequent Armenian poets.

== Biography ==
Hovhannisyan was born on 26 April [O.S. 14 April] 1864 into a tailor's family in Vagharshapat (Etchmiadzin), then within the Erivan Governorate of the Russian Empire. He attended parochial school in his hometown, then the progymnasium in Yerevan before studying in Moscow at the Lazaryan Language Institute (1877–83) and the historical-philological faculty of the Imperial Moscow University (1884–88).

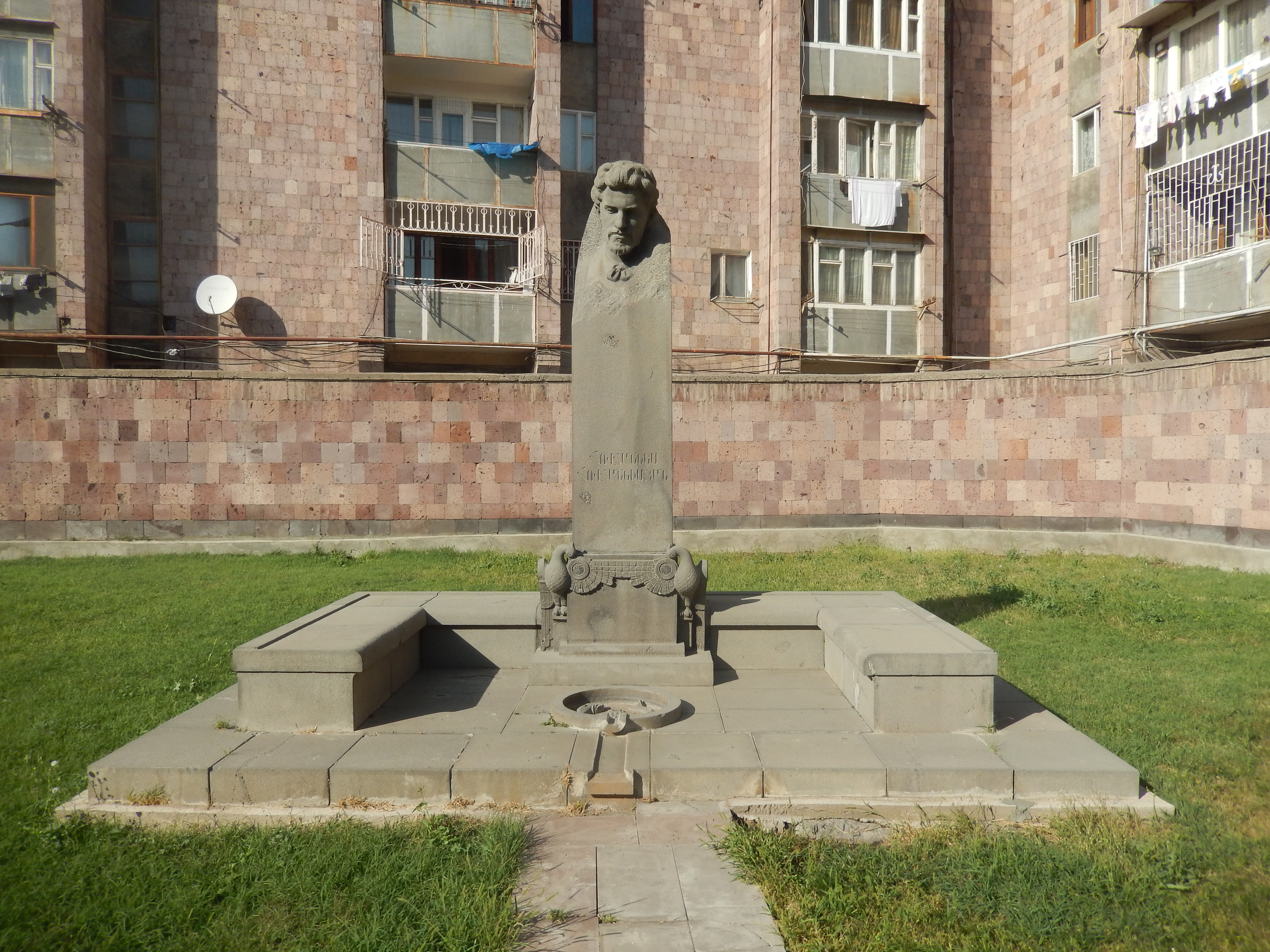
Hovhannes Hovhannisyan's bust in the yard of the museum renamed after him

In 1889, he traveled around Europe and visited various cities, including Constantinople, London, Paris and Vienna. Hovhannisyan returned to Vagharshapat and began his teaching career at the Gevorkian Seminary, where he taught Russian language and literature, general literature, and Greek. He taught there until 1912. One of his students was the future author Derenik Demirchian, whose views on literature Hovhannisyan is said to have influenced.

In 1912, Hovhannisyan briefly worked in Baku. He was a supporter of the 1917 Russian Revolution and the creation of the Soviet Union. In 1918, during the days of the revolutionary Baku Commune, he served in its department of education. He headed the branch of the People's Commissariat for Education in the district of Vagharshapat. In 1922, he worked in legislative committee of the Council of People's Commissars of the Armenian Soviet Socialist Republic. Hovhannisyan died in 1929 in Yerevan, aged 65. He was buried at the old Mler cemetery in the city, which was soon after developed into the Komitas Pantheon, the resting place of many of Armenia's most prominent cultural icons.

== Works and evaluation ==
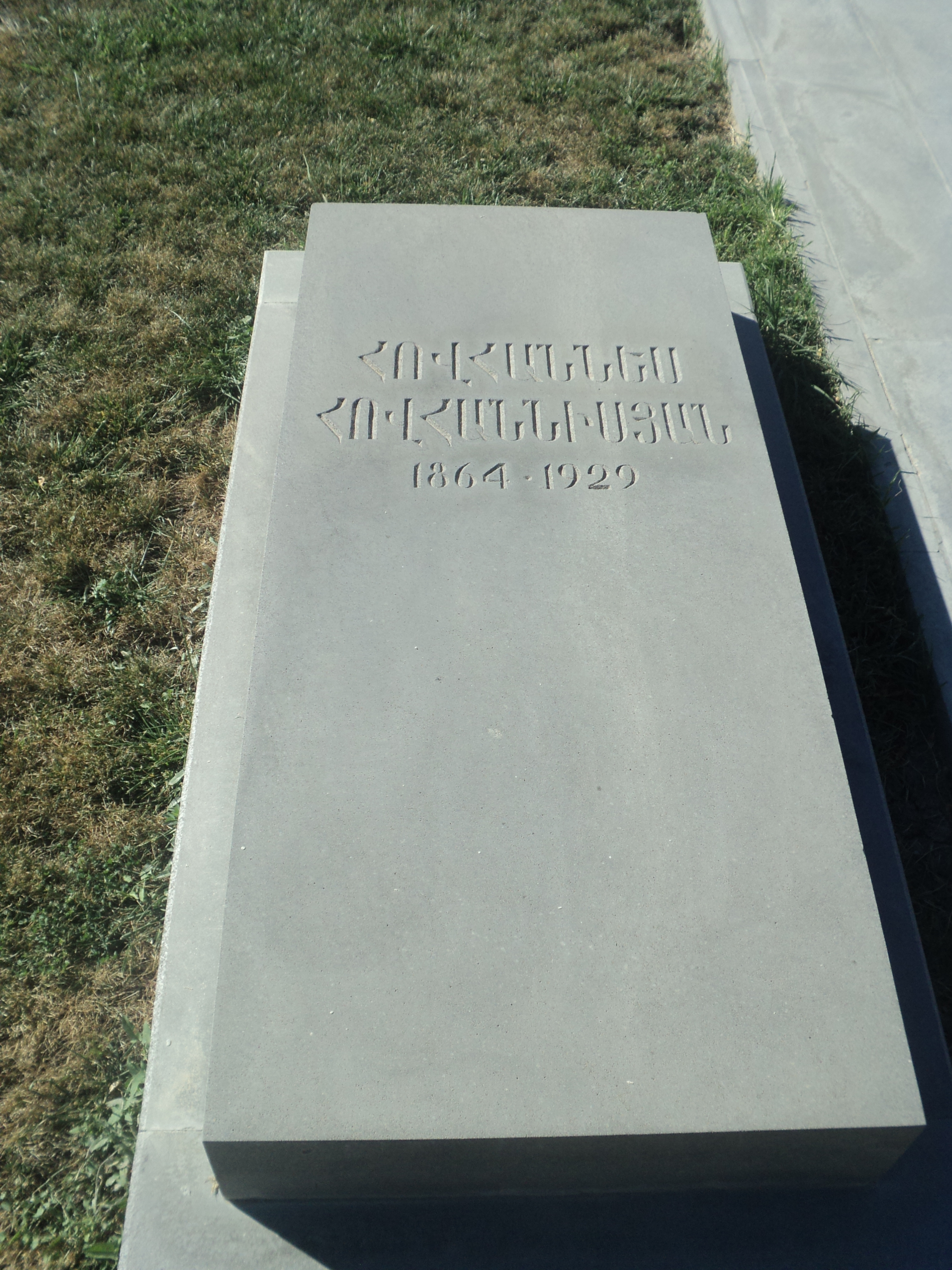
Hovhannisyan's gravesite

In 1883, Hovhannisyan published his first poem in the literary journal Aghbyur (Spring). He published his first collection of poetry in 1887, which gained him recognition. According to L. Asmarian, his volumes of poetry published 1908 and 1912 "secured his place in the history of Armenian poetry." While he was not very prolific, Hovhannisyan's melancholic poetry was influential for subsequent poets. Asmarian credits Hovhannisyan with the creation of a new school of Eastern Armenian poetry, followers of which included Hovhannes Tumanyan and Avetik Isahakyan, among others. Kevork Bardakjian writes that the "wistful, impersonal yearning" of Hovhannisyan's poetry "captured the mood of the age." He contrasts Hovhannisyan's style with that of the patriotic poetry of his teacher Smbat Shahaziz and Raphael Patkanian. Bardakjian praises Hovhannisyan for his "gentle, lyrical verse," his diction, and his attention to form, the last of which earlier authors had neglected and which later poets further developed.

The subjects of Hovhannisyan's poetry include love and nature, as well as tragedy and the hard life of Armenia's peasantry. His love poems, such as "Izur e hogis, izur, im hreshtak" (It's no use, my soul, it's no use, my angel) and "Kuzei linel karkach’un vtak" (I would like to be a babbling stream) emphasize the connection between man and nature. According to Asmarian, Hovhannisyan was the first Armenian poet to realistically depict the "inner contradictions of village life." In some of his poems he drew from elements of folk poetry. His patriotic poetry was first in the tradition of Romanticism, then shifted to realism. He encouraged Armenians not to give in to despair, despite their difficult situation.

Hovhannisyan also translated works from classic and contemporary writers, such as Homer, Shakespeare, Goethe, Schiller, Victor Hugo, Alexander Pushkin, Mikhail Lermontov, Nikolay Nekrasov, Heinrich Heine, Sándor Petőfi, Ludwig Uhland and others. In Asmarian's view, his translations of Władysław Syrokomla's "Niepiśmienny" (Illiterate) and Uhland's "Des Sängers Fluch" (The singer's curse) stand on their own as literary works. The mood of Hovhannisyan's poetry has been compared to that of the Russian poet Semyon Nadson.

Hovhannisyan's collected works were published in four volumes in Armenia from 1964 to 1968. His works have been translated into English, French, German, and Russian.

== Selected poems ==
- "Akh, tvek' indz k’aghts’r mi k’un" («Ա՜խ, տվեք ինձ քաղցր մի քուն», Oh, give me a sweet sleep), 1884
- "Izur e, hogis, izur, im hreshtak" («Իզուր է, հոգիս, իզուր, իմ հրեշտակ», It's no use, my soul, it's no use, my angel), 1885
- "Kuzei linel karkach’un vtak" («Կուզեի լինել կարկաչուն վտակ», I would like to be a babbling stream), 1888
- "Yerku chanaparh" («Երկու ճանապարհ», Two paths), 1883
- "Mnak' barov, arev, garun" («Մնաք բարով, արև, գարուն», Farewell, sun, spring), 1887
- "Ashugh" («Աշուղ»), 1887
- "Gyughi zhamë" («Գյուղի ժամը», The village church service), 1886
- "Hatik" («Հատիկ», Grain), 1886
- "Arazn yekav lap’in talov" («Արազն եկավ լափին տալով», The Aras came crashing), 1887 (translated into English by Zabelle C. Boyajian as "Araxes Came Devouringly")
- "Alagyaz bardzr sarin" («Ալագյազ բարձր սարին», On the high mountain of Alagyaz), 1901
- "Tesel es ardyok ayn blurnerë?" («Տեսե՞լ ես արդյոք այն բլուրները», Have you seen those hills?), 1880 (English version by Alice Stone Blackwell titled "Hast Thou Seen My Country?")
- "Mayrs" («Մայրս», My mother), 1896
- "Tghmut" («Տղմուտ», Swamp), 1887
- "Nor garun" («Նոր գարուն», New spring), 1897 (English translations by Alice Stone Blackwell and Zabelle C. Boyajian)
- "Sar i vern" («Սարն ի վեր», Up the mountain), 1896
- "Syunyats' ishkhanë" («Սյունյաց իշխանը», The prince of Syunik), 1887
- "Artavazd" («Սրտավազդ»), 1887
- "Vahagni tsnundë" («Վահագնի ծնունդը», The birth of Vahagn), 1904
- "Lusavorch’i kant’eghë" («Լուսավորչի կանթեղը», The lamp of the Illuminator), 1904

== Legacy ==
In 1948, the Hovhannes Hovhannisyan House-Museum was established. It is located in central Vagharshapat, near the Holy Mother of God Cathedral and the mayor's office. In 2009, it was reported that the museum was in a dilapidated state, but that the mayor's office of Vagharshapat intended to see it repaired.

== See also ==
- Armenian literature
