= Dzoraget Hydroelectric Power Station =

Hydroelectric power station in Lori, Armenia

Coordinates: 40°58′N 44°38′E

Dzoraget HPP
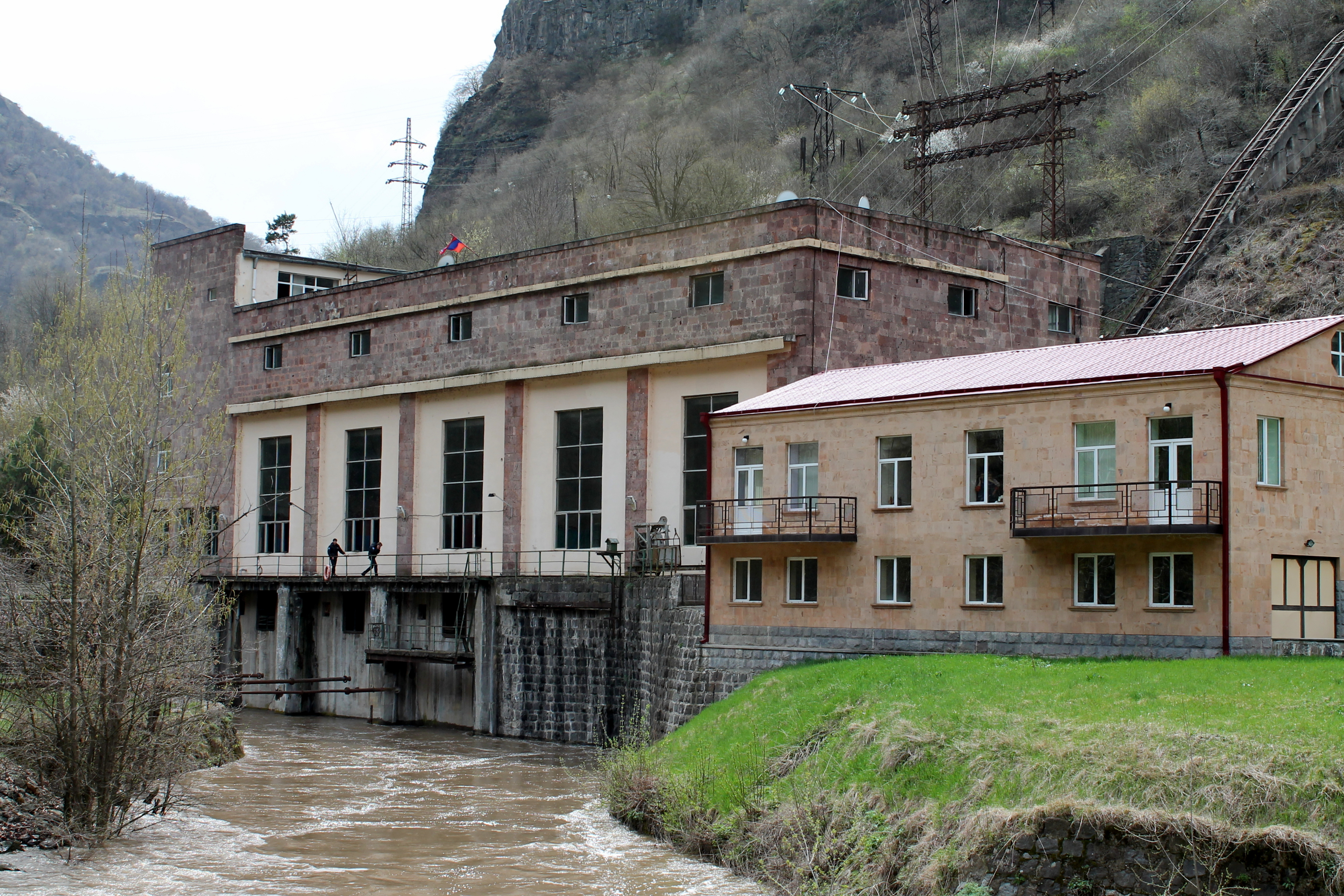
- Spillway structure
- Interactive map of Dzoraget HPP
- Location: Lori Region, Dzoraget Village, Armenia
- Construction began: 1927 (First Two Aggregates); 1949 (The Third Aggregate)
- Opening date: 1932 (First Powerhouse)
- Owner: Dzoraget LTD

Dam and spillways
- Type of dam: Run-of-the-river
- Impounds: Debed, Dzoraget River

Power Station
- Turbines: 3
- Installed capacity: 26.2 MW

The Dzoraget Hydroelectric Power Station (Armenian: Ձորագետի հիդրոէլեկտրակայան) is situated in Dzoraget village, Lori Region, Armenia. The plant is located on the coast of Debed River, but it uses the flows of the waters of Dzoraget River. Construction of the Dzoraget HPP started in 1927 and it was launched on 15 November 1932 with the full installed capacity of 22.32 MW. As of 1980, the plant uses three generators with an installed capacity of 26.2 MW. The Dzoraget Hydro Power Plant is considered to be small size power plant. There is a little water storage behind the weir, as Dzoraget HPP is a run-of-the-river plant.

== History ==
Construction of the power plant started in 1927. It took five years to build, until 1932. The power plant is created by the academician, engineer and a pioneer of the hydroelectric station construction in the Soviet Union Genrikh Graftio and the Armenian engineer and academician Hovhaness Nerses Meliq-Pashaev. The power plant construction was planned and organized by Iosif Andreh Ter-Astvacatryan. In 1931, Russian writer Marietta Shaginyan published her novel Hydrocentral (Gidrotsentral) about her observations of the plant's construction between 1926 and 1928.

The first time the Dzoraget power plant was commenced to work on 15 November 1932. In the same year, the first aggregate of Dzoraget HPP with a capacity of 7.4 MW was commissioned to the work, in a year the plant operated at the full installed capacity of 22.32 MW with the average annual water flow capacity of 14.92 MW. The first two aggregates of the power plant were built in 1932. The third one was constructed in 1949.

Before 2011, the power plant belonged to the Ministry of Defense. In 2011, Dzoraget SHPP was privatized by the "Dzoraget" LTD, owned by President Serzh Sargsyan's son-in-law.

Compared to the other means of getting energy, small plants are considered ecologically friendly, though it is obligatory for ENA to buy the energy generated by SHPPs for almost 15 years. In Armenia before 2011 small plants were considered those with installed capacity lower than 10 MW. After 2011 the border of this number increased up to 30 MW, and all around Armenia Dzoraget SHPP was the only plant to benefit from this change. The company made cash surplus paid by ENA after those changes because ENA is obligated to buy energy from Small plants with a higher price because of its ecologically friendly category the "Dzoraget" LTD benefits.

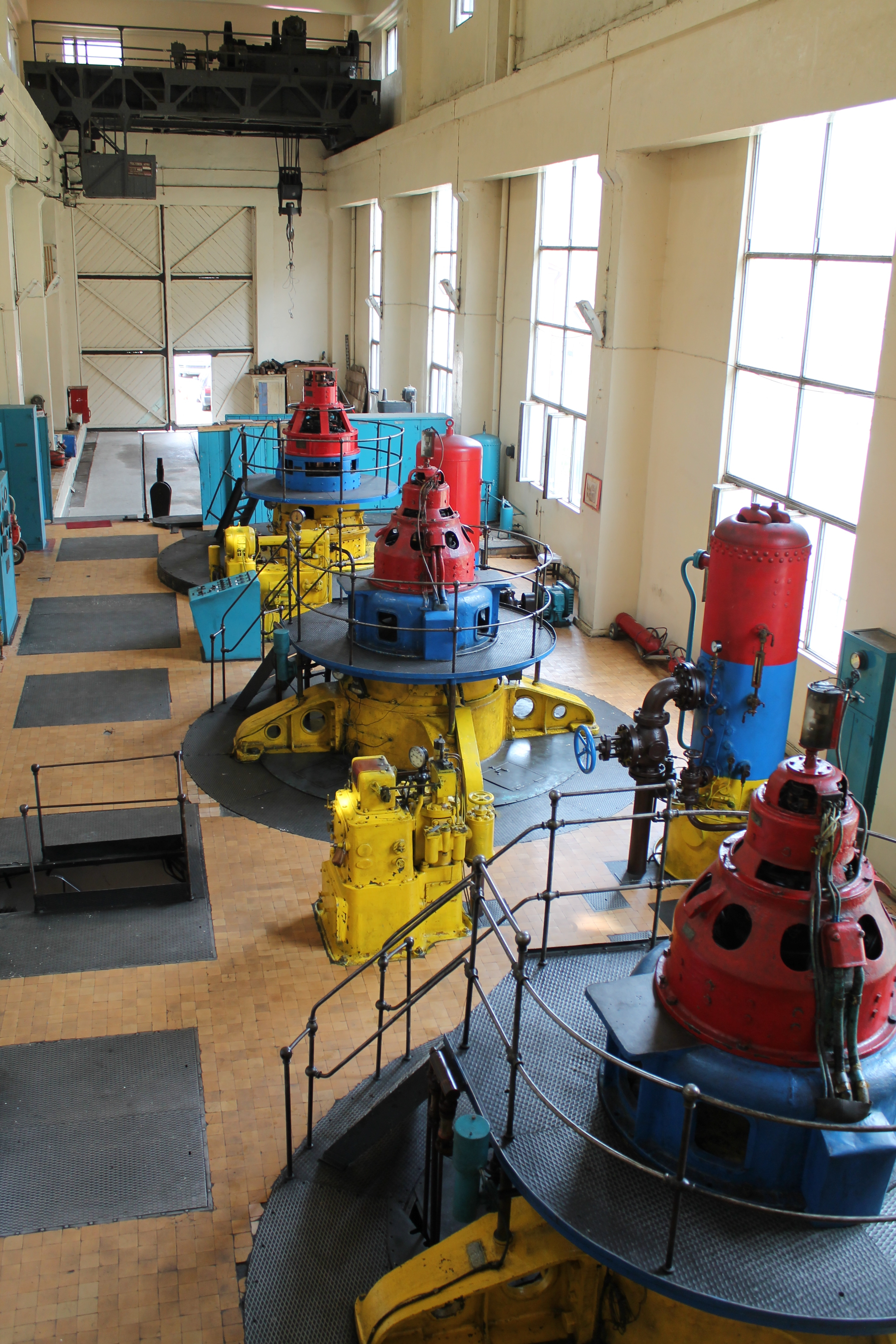
Generators of Dzoraget SHPP

== Technical description ==
The Dzoraget hydropower plant is a run-of-the-river type of hydroelectric power plant with a dam. The dam of this type of plant cannot store large amounts of water, therefore its reservoir is referred to as pondage. Water flows to the power plant from the dam through the penstock with 1,300 mm (51 in) diameter. The output is a function of both the "head" and the rate of water flow. The head is a vertical distance from the highest level of dammed water to the power producing turbine, which has a height of 974 meters. As the amount of the electricity is a direct function of the water flow, the amount of electricity generated differs from year to year. In 2013, the amount of electricity generated was 76.26 GWh, in 2014 the amount was only 69.23 GWh, and in November 2015 the amount generated was already 81.63 GWh. Turbine is adjusted to the different flow rate and pressures. The wheel is rotated due to the pressure and volume of the incoming water. There are three generators that are connected to the turbine by shafts and possibly gears so when the turbine spins it causes the generators to spin also. As a result, generators convert the mechanical energy from the turbine into electric energy. The capacity of those aggregates is 8.8, 8.8, and 8.6 MW respectively. In addition to them, there is another aggregate, which was constructed to cover only for self-needs of the power plant to maintain the work was done by it, which has the capacity of 120 kW. It is mainly used in times of lack of the electricity in order not stop the work of the power plant. There are transmission lines connected to the generators, which conduct electricity from the hydropower plant to the regions.

Dzoraget SHPP has some deviations from its project. Its pillar is 0.5 m (1 ft 8 in) higher and 4.75 m (15.6 ft) longer than it was designed in the primary plans. There is a fish pass in the head of the plant that does not meet the defined standards and criterion. In addition to it, there is one more pillar, without a fish pass. Therefore, the natural movements of fish in the constructed pillar are impossible. There is no fish-protecting network either. Extra height and artificial waterfall create challenges for fish to move along the river in both directions. Nevertheless, as the water from the river is not used for irrigation, it causes a little negative environmental impact.

== Hydrology ==
Dzoraget river is mountain starting river, accordingly the river gets water from snow, rain and groundwater, which accounts for seasonal water regime. Water flow is the highest during spring. Observations show that water discharge is 2.66 m^{3}/s and flow module is 19 L·s^{−1}·km^{−2}. The data shows that the average annual water flow figure is equal to one m^{3}/s. In most cases the maximal discharge for the river section of Dzoraget SHPP is assumed to be equal to 56.2 m^{3}/s.

Monthly water energy indicators
	1	2	3	4	5	6	7	8	9	10	11	12	Total
Average monthly discharge Dzoraget SHPP (m^{3}/s)	0.1	0.16	0.17	1.52	2.2	2.2	0.96	0.48	0.35	0.3	0.3	0.31	
SHPP average monthly capacity (mwt)	0.11	0.17	0.18	1.54	2.06	2.06	1.01	0.51	0.38	032	0.32	0.33	
SHPP-average monthly energy production (mln kwt/hour)	0.08	0.12	0.14	1.11	1.53	1.48	0.75	0.38	0.27	0.24	0.23	0.25	6.58

Dzoraget River's geological composition is highly differentiated but mainly consists of volcanic rocks. There are tuff, granite, basalt, andesite-basalt. Despite the Dzoraget SHPP, it is planned to construct The Loriberd hydropower plant, with the capacity of 66 MW and annual electricity production of 200 million KWh.

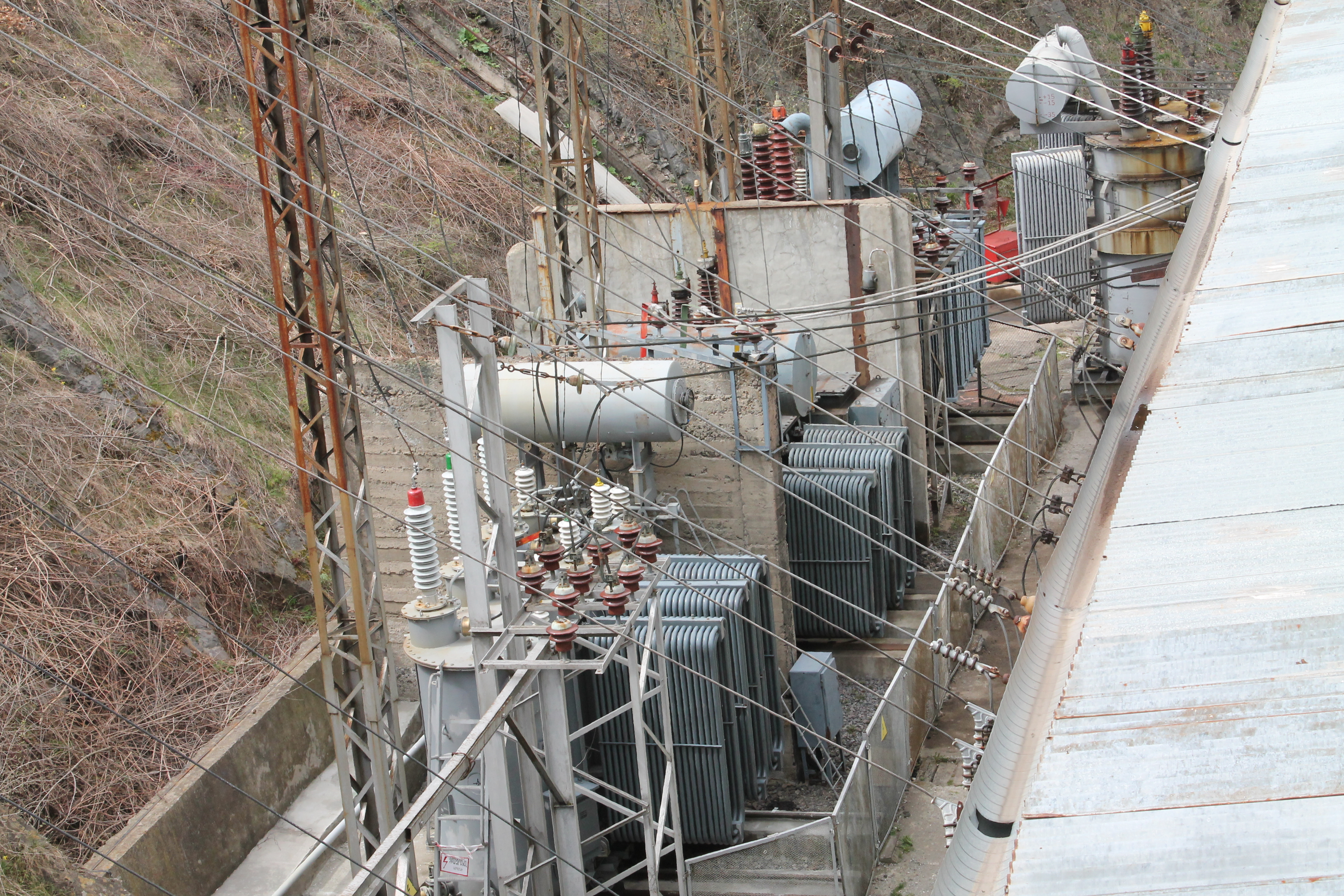
Transformators of Dzoraget SHPP

Indicators	Values
Derivation capacity, kwt	2.06
Average multi-annual production of energy, mln kwt/hour	6.58
Capital investments into SHPPS(without VAT)	
thousand USD	1977.4
USD / kwt	959.4
USD / kwt.hour	0.3
Prime cost of power production, cents/kwt hour	1.6

== Financial data ==
Annual exploitation expenses for power production on Dzoraget SHPP are composed of depreciation and exploitation expenses. Depreciation is accepted on linear basis with 3.3% annually. For 2008 the total costs amounted to $106,300 and were composed of depreciation cost equal to $65,300 and annual exploitation expenses costs equal to $41,000- salary expenses equal to $20,200, renovation expenses equal to $15,800 and other expenses equal to $5,000.

The data from 2014 and 2013 regarding the company's financial performance indicates that it is earning a much lower profit in 2014 (AMD 289,369,000) than in 2013 (AMD 626,922,000), primarily because of increase in administrative expenses and production costs. In addition, the total amount of assets has decreased by AMD 453,747,000 primarily as a result of an increase in accounts receivables and decrease in current investments. These patterns were accompanied by a decrease in equity amounting to AMD 109,172,000, the decrease in non-current liabilities equal to AMD 351,335,00, and increase in current liabilities equal to AMD 6,761,00. There is not enough information about the company's costs and revenues, because it is a privately owned one. However, it is apparent that company earned low profits in 2014 than in 2013.

== Gallery ==
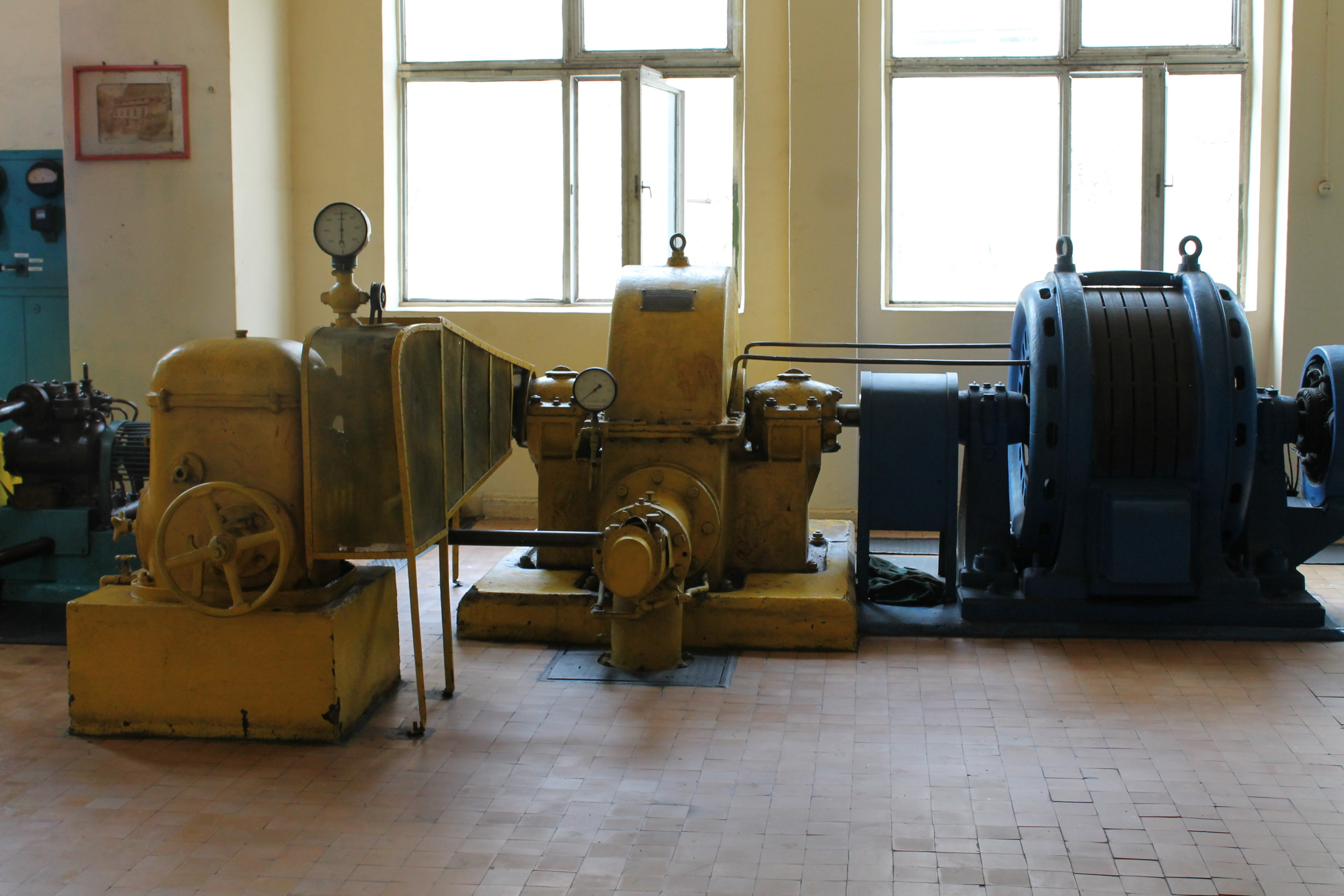
Hidraulic unit for the Dzoraget SHPP's own needs

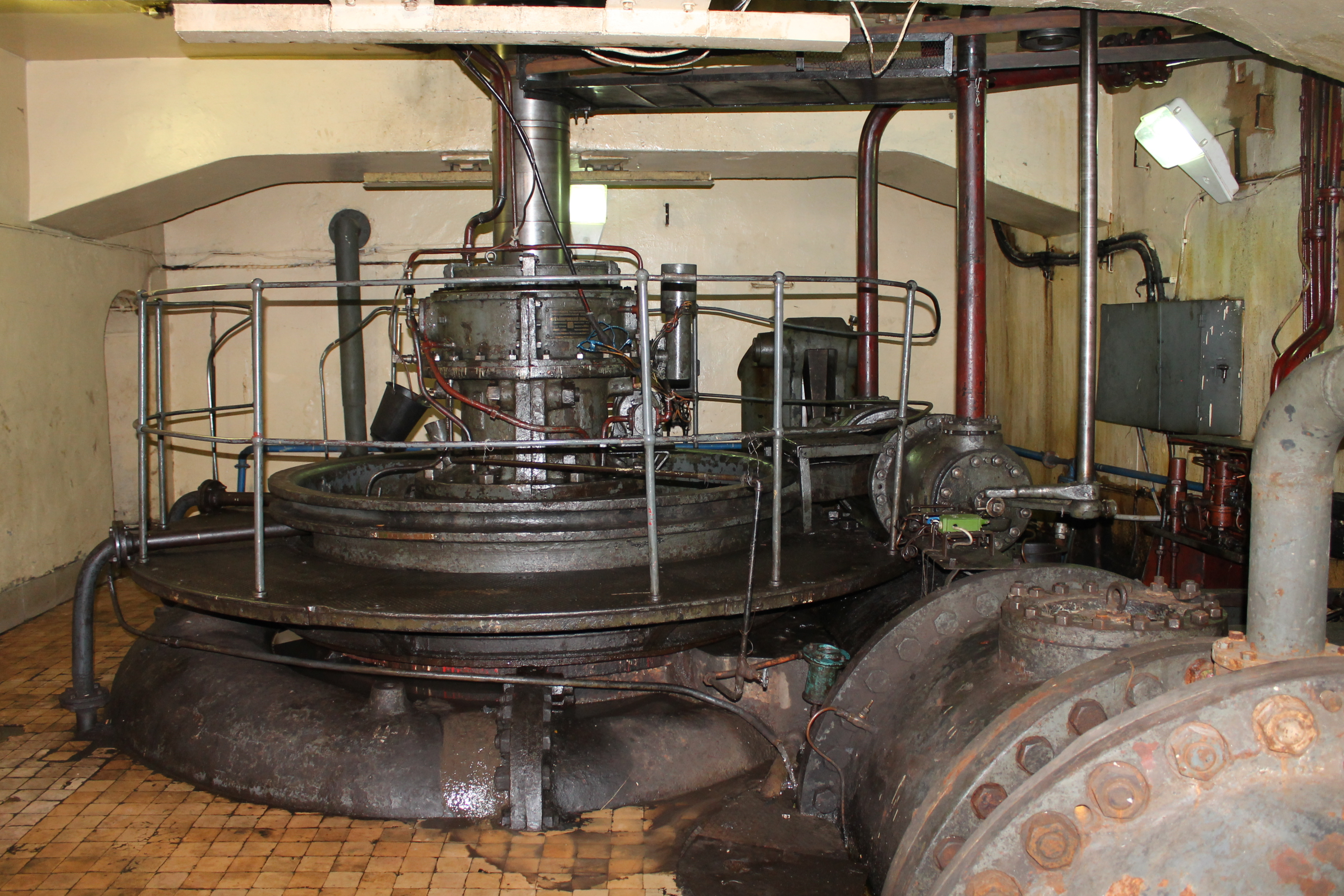
Hydroturbine of Dzoraget SHPP

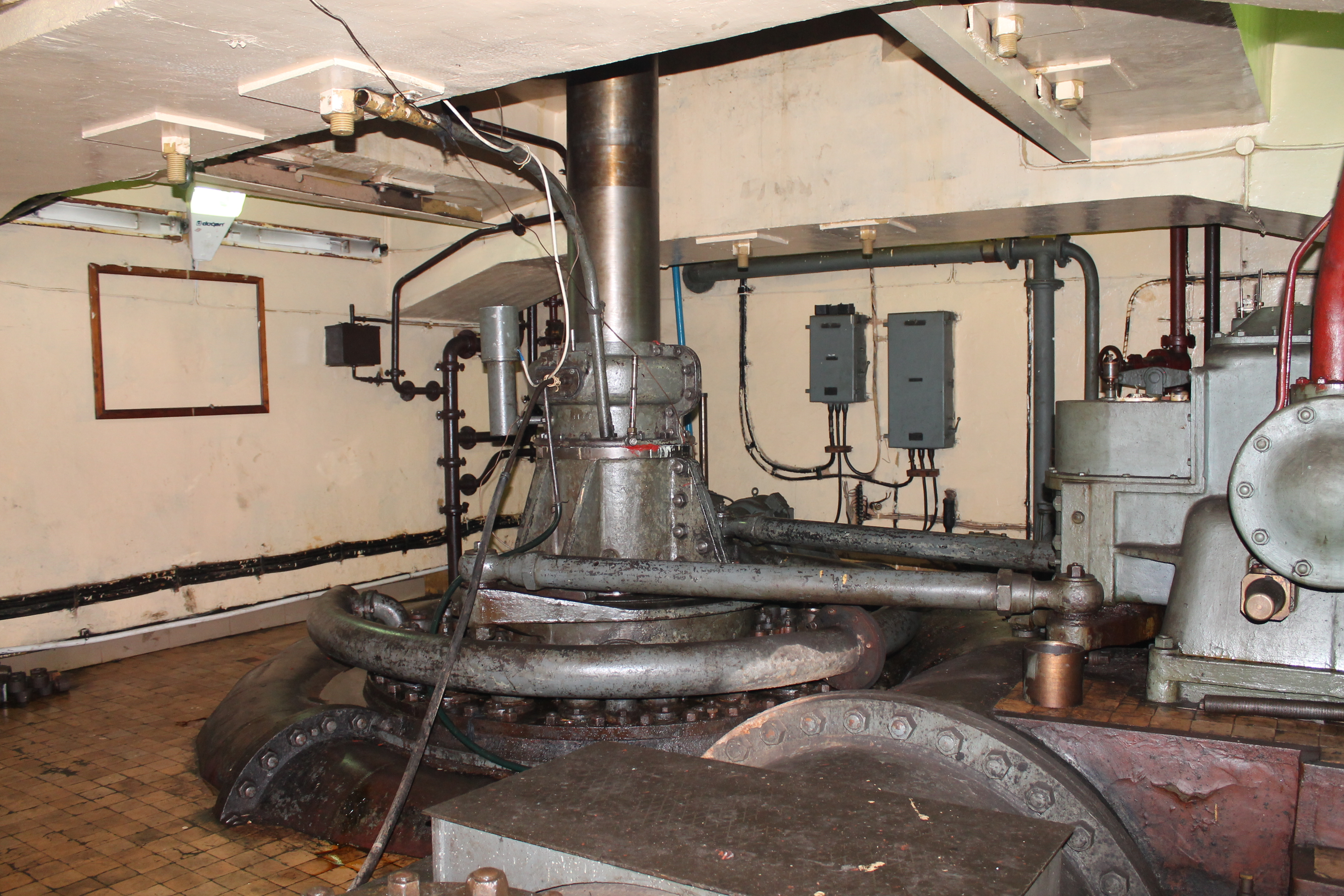
Hydroturbine of Dzoraget SHPP

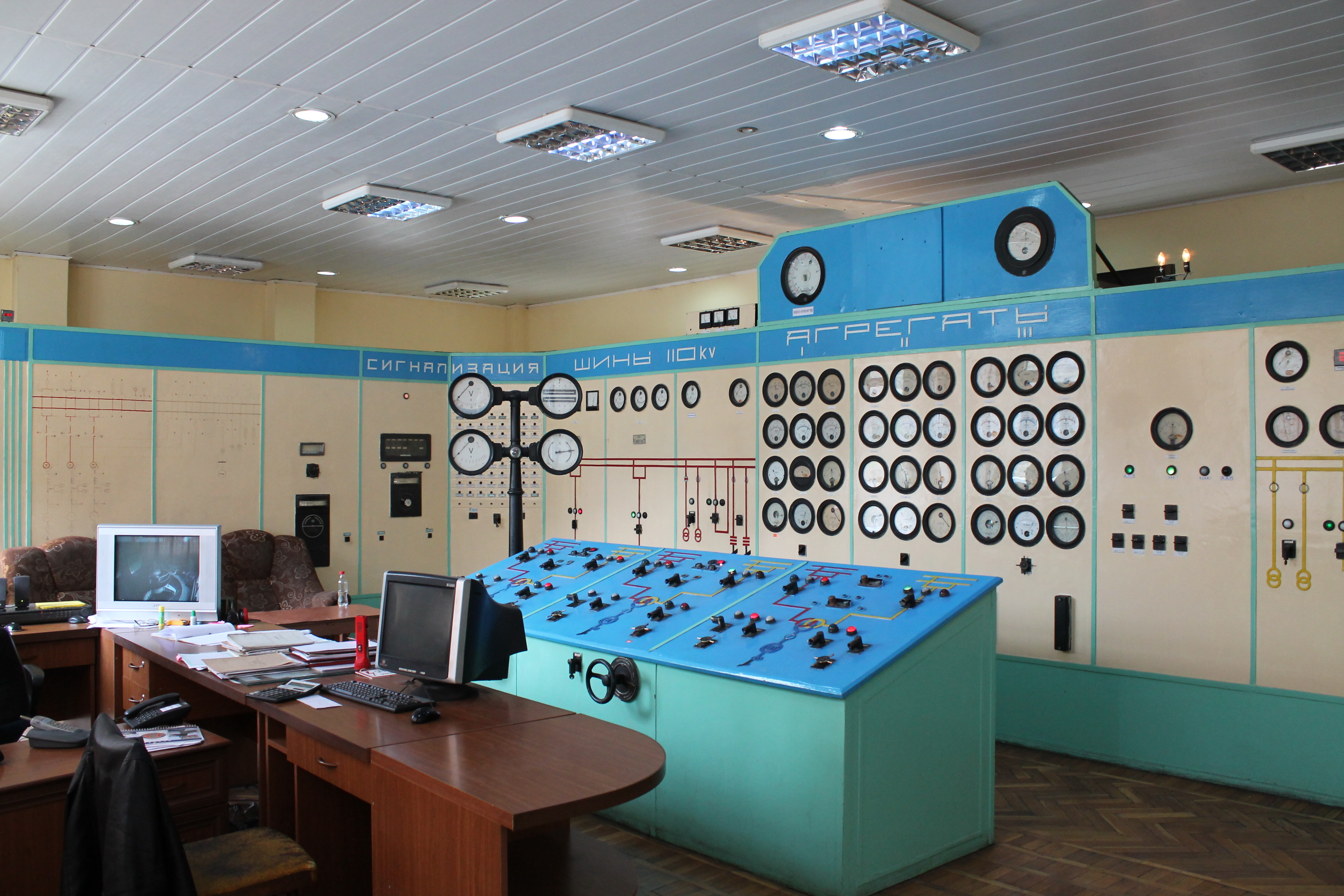
CPU of Dzoraget SHPP

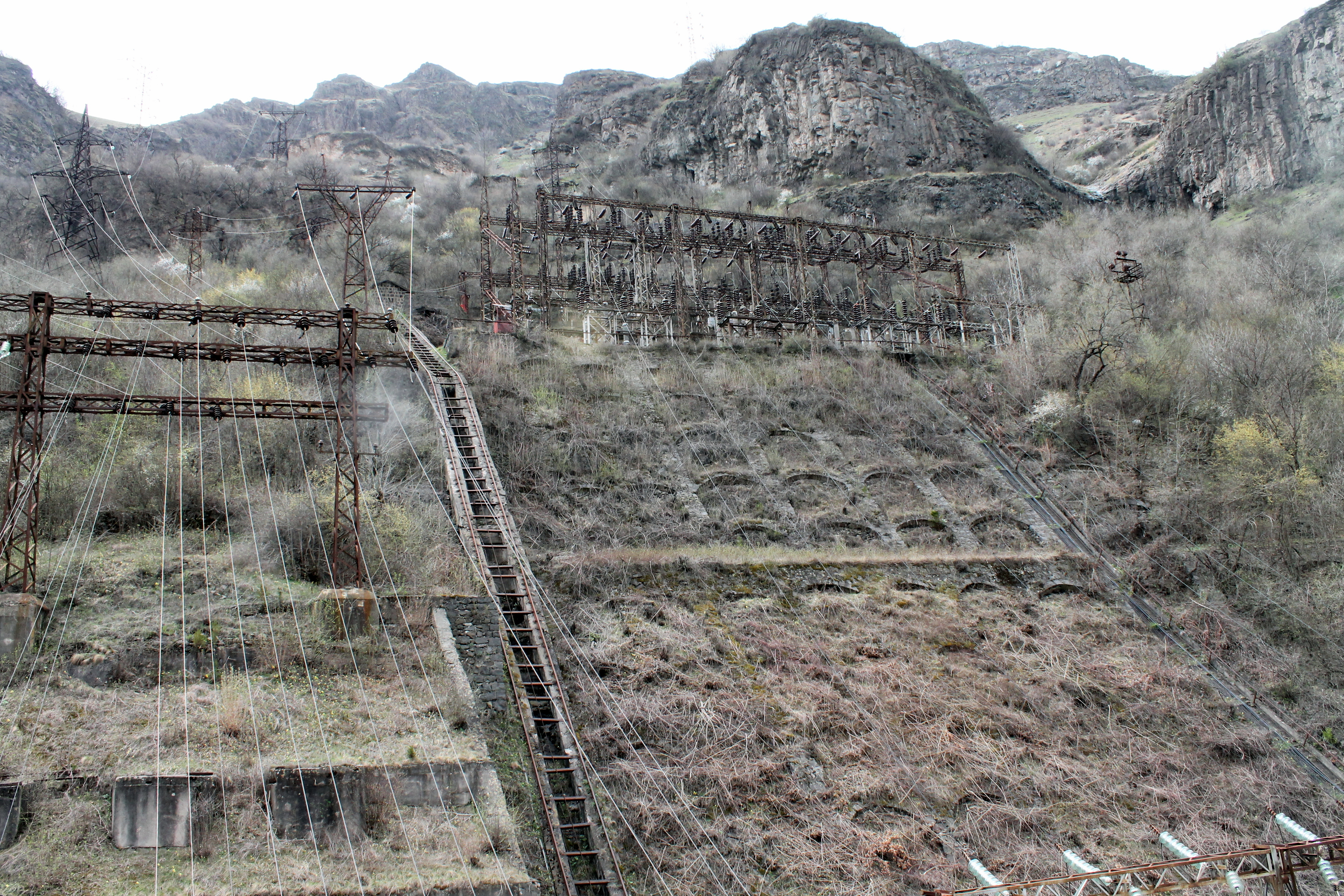
Structure and gravity runway of Dzoraget SHPP

== See also ==
- Energy in Armenia
