= Haghtanak, Yerevan =

Haghtanak
- Location within Armenia
- Coordinates: 40°11′11″N 44°25′26″E
- Country: Armenia
- Marz (Province): Yerevan
- District: Malatia-Sebastia
- Time zone: UTC+4 ( )
  - Summer (DST): UTC+5 ( )

Haghtanak (Armenian: Հաղթանակ, also, Haght’anak, Akhtanak, and Chorort Gyukh) is a neighbourhood in the Yerevan Province of Armenia.
