= Avis Nurijanyan =

People's Commissar for Military Affairs of the Armenian SSR
- In office December 1920 – May 1921
- Preceded by: position established
- Succeeded by: Alexander Miasnikian

People's Commissar for Internal Affairs of the Armenian SSR
- In office July 1921 – August 1921
- Preceded by: Poghos Makintsyan
- Succeeded by: Shavarsh Amirkhanyan

Personal details
- Born: 3 December 1896 Vachagan, Elisabethpol Governorate, Russian Empire (now Kapan, Armenia)
- Died: 16 September 1938 (aged 41) Armenian SSR, Soviet Union
- Party: Armenian Revolutionary Federation (1917–1918); Russian Communist Party (Bolsheviks) (1918–1927, 1929–1937/8)

Avis (Avetis) Soghomoni Nurijanyan (Armenian: Ավիս Սողոմոնի Նուրիջանյան; 3 December 1896 – 16 September 1938) was a Bolshevik revolutionary and Soviet politician of Armenian origin who served as the People's Commissar for Military Affairs of the Armenian SSR from 1920 to 1921 and People's Commissar for Internal Affairs in 1921. He is infamous for his role in carrying out mass repressions immediately following the Sovietization of Armenia.

== Biography ==
Avis Nurijanyan was born in 1896 in the village of Vachagan (now a part of the city of Kapan) to a peasant family. He graduated from the Shusha Real School, then studied at the faculty of economics of the Kiev Commercial Institute from 1913 to 1917. He abandoned his studies after his fourth year at the institute and participated in revolutionary activities. During World War I, he served in the Russian Army on the Caucasus front.

Nurijanyan was a member of the Armenian Revolutionary Federation (ARF) in 1917. In 1918, he joined the Russian Communist Party (Bolsheviks). He took part in revolutionary activities in Baku and the creation of the Baku Commune in 1918. He was elected a member of the Baku underground committee of the Russian Communist Party, but was arrested and expelled from Azerbaijan in the summer of 1919. He then held a leading position in the Bolshevik organization in Alexandropol (modern-day Gyumri, Armenia). In January 1920, he was elected a member of the Armenia Committee (Armenkom) of the Russian Communist Party. While in Alexandropol, he took part in the organization of the failed May Uprising of 1920 against the ARF-led government of the Republic of Armenia. After the suppression of the rebellion, he fled to Azerbaijan.

In September 1920, Nurijanyan participated in the meeting of the communist organizations of Armenia in Baku and was elected a member of the Central Committee of the newly created Communist Party of Armenia. He was also a member of the Revolutionary Committee of Armenia (Armrevkom) formed in Azerbaijan, which made up the new government of Armenia following its Sovietization in November–December 1920. From November 1920 to May 1921, he served as the People's Commissar for Military Affairs of Soviet Armenia.

Although the Bolsheviks had initially agreed to grant immunity to the former political and military leadership of Armenia, Nurijanyan and his allies were eager to take revenge for the violent suppression of the May Uprising and destroy the remnants of the "bourgeois, nationalist regime" of the ARF. He was one of the chief perpetrators of the forced exile and repression of numerous political and military figures of the First Republic of Armenia in January 1921.

Bakhshi Ishkhanyan, an Armenian Marxist author, described Nurijanyan as "the Herostratus of Armenia. A sick young student operating under the influence of his constantly agitated brain, a total sadist and degenerate." The repressions that Nurijanyan conducted were one of the causes of the February Uprising of 1921, when Soviet power in Armenia was briefly overthrown by an ARF-led rebellion. The harsh methods of the Armenian Bolshevik leadership prompted Soviet leader Vladimir Lenin to send Alexander Miasnikian to take leadership and stabilize the situation in Armenia.

=== Later years and death ===
Nurijanyan left Armenia and held various positions in the Communist Party bureaucracy in Leningrad and Ryazan from 1923 to 1930. He was a supporter of the Trotskyist Left Opposition and was consequently expelled from the Communist Party in 1927, although his party membership was restored in 1929.

Starting in 1930 he worked as the chairman of the kolkhoz center of the Transcaucasian SFSR, but as of 1937 he was not working. He worked in Tbilisi until 1937, when he returned to Armenia. Nurijanyan fell victim to the Great Purge of 1937–1938.

According some sources, he was arrested in June 1937 and died in prison that year, while another source reports that he was sentenced to death on 19 July 1938 and executed on 16 September 1938.
