= Frunze Dovlatyan =

Soviet actor

- Ֆրունզե Դովլաթյան
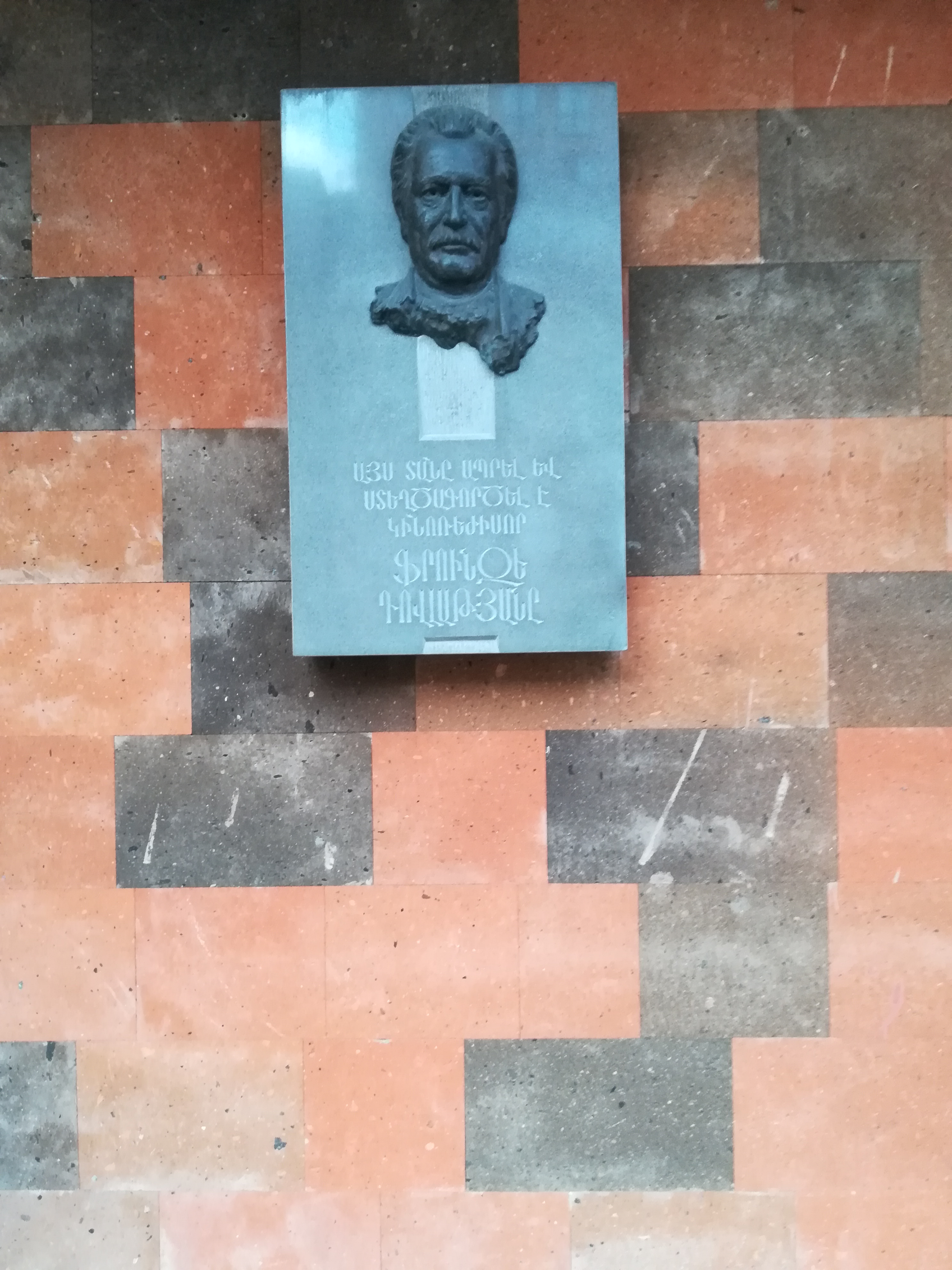
- Plaque marking Dovlatyan's former home in Yerevan, Armenia
- Born: May 26, 1927; Gavar, Soviet Armenia
- Died: August 30, 1997 (aged 70); Yerevan, Armenia
- Occupations: film director, screenwriter and actor
- Awards: People's Artist of USSR (1983)

Frunze Vaghinaki Dovlatyan (Armenian: Ֆրունզե Վաղինակի Դովլաթյան; May 26, 1927 – August 30, 1997) was an Armenian film director, screenwriter and actor.

== Biography ==
Frunze Dovlatyan was born in Gavar, Soviet Armenia, a brother to Vram Dovlatyan. He was a theater actor before becoming a director. He starred as an actor in Armenian provincial theatres from 1941 and then in Gabriel Sundukian Drama Theatre of Yerevan, where he was awarded Stalin Prize for his performance in the role of Hrayr in the play Ays astgherë mern en ("These Stars Are Ours"). In 1959, he graduated from the directing department of the All-Union State Institute of Cinematography (VGIK) in Moscow, where he studied under Sergei Gerasimov. His most well-known film is Barev, yes em ("Hello, That's Me!", 1967), which received the State Prize of the Armenian SSR. Dovlatyan headed the Armenfilm state film studio in the 1980s. He was awarded the State Prize of the Armenian SSR in 1967 and title of People's Artist of the USSR in 1983. He died in Yerevan aged 70. He is buried in Tokhmakh Cemetery in Yerevan.

== Filmography ==
Year	Title	Role	Notes
1943	Davit Bek	Melik Mansur	
1947	Anahit	Vachagan	
1958	Ov e meghavor? ("Who is Guilty?")	—N/a	Director only
1958	Inchu e aghmkum getë? ("Why does the River Make Noise?")	Manukyan	
1960	Yasha Toporkov	Mirzoyan	
1961	Dima Gorin's Career	—N/a	Co-director with Lev Mirsky
1963	Aravotyan gnatskner ("Morning Trains")	—N/a	Director only
1965	Barev, yes em ("Hello, That's Me!")	Zaryan	Also director
1968	Saroyan yeghbayrner ("Saroyan Brothers")	Hayk Saroyan	Also creative adviser
1972	Yerevanyan oreri khronika ("Chronicle of Yerevan Days")	—N/a	Screenwriter (with Perch Zeytuntsyan) and director
1976	Yerkunk ("Delivery")	—N/a	Director only
1976	Khonarhvir galik orvan ("Bow to the Coming Day")	professor	
1979	Apretsek yerkar ("Live Long")	—N/a	Screenwriter (with Shahen Tatikyan) and director
1982	Siramargi chichë ("The Peacock's Cry")	—N/a	Screenwriter with Arnold Aghababov
1982	Venetiki mijazgayin gitazhoghovë ("International Academic Conference in Venice")	—N/a	Documentary; writer and director
1982	Mkhitaryannerë ("The Mkhitarists")	—N/a	Documentary; writer and director
1982	Mshakuytneri kamurj ("Bridge of Cultures")	—N/a	Documentary; writer and director
1985	Menavor ënkuzeni ("The Lone Walnut Tree")	Kamsaryan	Also screenwriter (with Arnold Aghababov) and director
1986	Otar khagher ("Foreign Games")	Aslanian	
1989	Aghbaman ("Garbage Bin")	—N/a	Short film; screenwriter
1986	Karot ("Nostalgia")	—N/a	Director only
1986	Labirintos ("Labyrinth")	Abel	
1990	Yearning	—N/a	Director only
