= List of Armenian films of the 1980s =

This is a list of films released in the 1980s produced in Armenia SSR or by Armenian directors or about Armenia or Armenians, ordered by year of release.

Title	Director	Cast	Genre	Notes
1980
A Piece of Sky	Henrik Malyan	Frunzik Mkrtchyan; Sofiko Chiaureli; Ashot Adamyan; Galina Belyayeva	Comedy	Based on Vahan Totovents's story "Light Blue Flowers"
The Big Win	Albert Mkrtchyan	Frunzik Mkrtchyan	Comedy	
1981
1982
Gikor	Sergey Israelyan	Albert Gulinyan; Sos Sargsyan; Galya Novents; Armen Dzhigarkhanyan	Drama	Based on Hovhannes Tumanyan's poem.
The Mechanics of Happiness	Nerses Hovhannisyan	Azat Gasparyan; Alla Tumanian; Verjaluys Mirijanyan; Murad Kostanyan; Georgi Minasyan		
The Song of the Old Days	Albert Mkrtchyan	Shahum Ghazaryan; Frunzik Mkrtchyan; Verjaluys Mirijanyan; Azat Gasparyan	Drama	
1983
The Fire	Dmitri Kesayants; H. Hakobyan	Frunzik Mkrtchyan; Henrik Alaverdyan; Armen Khostikyan; Volodya Grigoryan; Verjaluys Mirijanyan		
1984
The Tango of Our Childhood	Albert Mkrtchyan	Frunzik Mkrtchyan; Galya Novents	Tragicomedy	
1985
1986
1987
1988
1989

== See also ==
- List of Soviet films
