= List of Armenian films of the 1960s =

This is a list of films released in the 1960s produced in Armenia SSR or directed by Armenians or about Armenia or Armenians, ordered by year of release.

| Title | Director | Cast | Genre | Notes |
|---|---|---|---|---|
1960
| Guys from the Army Band | Henrik Malyan; Henrik Margaryan | Levon Tukhikyan; Frunzik Mkrtchyan; Armen Khostikyan | Drama, Comedy | |
1961
| Tjvjik | Arman Manaryan | Hrachia Nersisyan; Tsolak Amerikyan; Arman Kotikyan | | |
1962
| Путь на арену Road to the Stage | Henrik Malyan; Levon Isahakyan | Leonid Yengibarov; Izabella Danzas; Hayk Danzas; Varduhi Varderesyan; Karp Khachvankyan | Comedy | |
| The Master and the Servant | Dmitry Kesayants | Frunzik Mkrtchyan; Sos Sargsyan; Tadevos Saryan; Meline Hamamjyan; Armen Khostikyan | | Based on Hovhannes Tumanyan's fairy tale |
1963
1964
1965
1966
| Բարև, ես եմ Hello, That's Me! | Frunze Dovlatyan | Armen Dzhigarkhanyan | Drama | It was entered into the 1966 Cannes Film Festival, nominated to Palme d'Or and awarded by the State Prize of Armenia in 1967. |
1967
| Եռանկյունի; Triangle | Henrik Malyan | Henrik Malyan; Armen Dzhigarkhanyan; Frunzik Mkrtchyan; Sos Sargsyan | | |
1968
1969
| Նռան գույնը The Color of Pomegranates | Sergei Parajanov | Sofiko Chiaureli; Melkon Aleksanyan; Vilen Galstyan; Giorgi Gegechkori | Biography, Drama | It made the Top 10 list in Cahiers du cinéma in 1982 and "Top 100" in Time Out. |
| We and Our Mountains | Henrik Malyan | Azat Sherents; Frunzik Mkrtchyan; Sos Sargsyan | Comedy | Based on Hrachya Kochar's novel |

== See also ==
- List of Soviet films
