= List of Armenian films =

This is a list of notable films produced in the country of Armenia.

== Before 1920s ==
- List of Armenian films before 1920

== 1920s ==
- List of Armenian films of the 1920s

== 1930s ==
- List of Armenian films of the 1930s

== 1940s ==
- List of Armenian films of the 1940s

== 1950s ==
- List of Armenian films of the 1950s

== 1960s ==
- List of Armenian films of the 1960s

== 1970s ==
- List of Armenian films of the 1970s

== 1980s ==
- List of Armenian films of the 1980s

== 1990s ==
- List of Armenian films of the 1990s

== 2000s ==
- List of Armenian films of the 2000s

== 2010s ==
- List of Armenian films of the 2010s

== 2020s ==
- List of Armenian films of the 2020s
