= List of Armenian SSR State Prize winners =

== 1965 ==
- Hrachya Kochar (for "Nahapet" novel),
- Aram Khachaturian,
- Sergei Aslamazyan, Avet Gabrielian, Rafayel Davidian, Henry Talalyan (Komitas quartet),
- Martiros Sarian
- Gohar Gasparyan

== 1967 ==
=== Arts: ===
- Paruyr Sevak ("Anlreli Zangakatun" poem)
- Arno Babajanian ("Six pictures for piano" composition)
- Harutyun Kalents (for the portraits of A. Gitovich, A. Alikhanian etc.)
- Yervand Kochar (Sasuntsi David monument)
- Olga Gulazian
- Edgar Hovhannisyan, Vilen Galstyan ("Haverjakan kurk" ballet),
- Frunze Dovlatyan, Albert Yavuryan ("Barev, yes em" film)
- Stepan Kevorkov, Erazm Melik-Karamyan, Ivan Dildaryan, Artashes Jalalyan (films about Kamo)

== 1971 ==
=== Arts: ===
- Gegham Sarian
- Vakhtang Ananyan
- Grigor Yeghiazaryan
- Hovhannes Chekijian
- Vardan Ajemian
- Ara Sargsyan
- Gurgen Borian, Khoren Abrahamyan, Frunze Dovlatian, Arkady Hayrapetian, Sergey Gevorkyan, Karen Masian, Rafayel Babayan ("Saroyan yeghbayrner" film)
- Alexander Tamanian, Sergey Merkurov, Gevork Tamanian, Samvel Safaryan, Varazdat Arevshatyan, Mark Grigoryan, Eduard Sarapyan, Levon Vardanov, Natalia Paremuzova (Lenin Square of Yerevan)
- Razmik Alaverdian, Ruben Badalyan, Suren Burkhajian, Gurgen Mnatsakanyan (building of Yerevan Sundukian theater)

== 1973 ==
- Nairi Zaryan
- Khazhak Gyulnazaryan
- Alexander Arutiunian
- Medea Abrahamyan
- Gurgen Janibekyan

== 1975 ==
=== Arts: ===
- Hamo Sahyan
- Hovhannes Shiraz
- Minas Avetisyan
- Alexander Adjemian
- Alexander Grigoryan
- Sarkis Arutchyan
- Gurgen Shakhnazarov
- Nina Yegorova
- Yuri Rychkov
- Rachya Kaplanyan
- Suren Kocharyan
- Henrik Malyan
- Aghasi Ayvazyan
- Sergei Israelyan
- Armen Dzhigarkhanyan
- Mher "Frunzik" Mkrtchyan
- Sos Sargsyan

== 1977 ==
=== Arts: ===
- Sero Khanzadyan
- Vahagn Davtyan
- Akop Akopyan
- Avet Terteryan
- Jean Ter-Merguerian
- Ara Vauni
- Artsvin Grigoryan
- Serezha Nazaryan

== 1979 ==
=== Arts: ===
- Rachiya Ovanesyan
- Vardges Petrosyan
- Georgy Tigranov
- Lusina Zakaryan
- Zhora Arutyunyan
- Rachiya Kaplanyan
- Edgar Elbakyan
- Vaginak Marguni
- Sos Sargsyan
- Vardun Vardersyan
- Yuri Yerznkyan
- Armen Dzhigarkhanyan
- Ashot Aleksanyan
- Feliks Akopyan
- Eduard Safaryan
- Vladimir Atanyan
- Ara Shiraz
- Koryun Akopyan
- Gurgen Musheghian
- Eduard Tosunyan
- Petros Tumanyan
- Arshavir Minasyan
- Suren Aghababyan

== 1981 ==
=== Arts: ===
- Mushegh Galshoyan
- Anant Saniyan
- Tigran Mansuryan
- David Khanjyan
- Perch Zeytuntsyan
- Guzh Manukyan
- Emma Vardanyan
- Albert Mkrtchyan
- Shaum Kazaryan
- Robert Elibekyan
- Akop Jnvanyan
- Garri Rashidyan
- Yan Isaakyan
- Ruben Zaryan

== 1983 ==
=== Arts: ===
- Maro Markarian
- Mkrtich Sargsyan
- Lazar Saryan
- Rafael Mantasryan
- Grant Matevosyan
- Artashes Ovanesyan
- Violette Gevorkyan
- Zhasmena Meryan
- Mamuk Mnatsakanyan
- Nerses Otanesyan
- Albert Yavurin
- Rafael Babayan
- Arno Babadzhanyan
- Alla Tumanyan
- Azat Gasparyan
- Grigor Khanjyan
- Jim Toposyan
- Mkrtich Minasyan
- Enzel Akopyan
- Arbak Oganesyan
- Feniks Darbinyan
- Albert Shakaryan
- Levon Akhverdyan
- Levon Mkrtchyan

== 1985 ==
=== Socialist labor competition: ===
- Vachik Azizyan
- Ashot Grigoryan
- Gevork Grigoryan
- Dmitry Karapetyan
- Sokrat Melkonyan
- Melik Papoyan
- Karapet Shairyan
- Martun Shakhbazyan
- Anush Yezekyan
- Lyudvik Mikaelyan
- Avetik Sukiasyan

=== Sciences: ===
- Galust Galoyan
- Tsatur Agayan
- Arshavir Akopyan
- Babken Arakelyan
- Suren Yeremyan
- Ashot Ioannisyan
- Gagik Sarkisyan
- Levon Khachikyan
- Jon Kirakosyan
- Stepan Yaklokov-Khizoryan
- Vostanik Ajemyan
- Oleg Bondarenko
- Zareg Vardanyan
- Leonid Vartanyan
- Eduard Grigoryan
- Zakhar Demirchyan
- Surik Sargsyan
- Albert Sarkisyan
- Petros Bezirganyan
- Kola Avetyan
- Sergey Shaboyan
- Rafael Movsesyan
- Genrik Babayan
- Arkady Barkhudaryan
- Vladimir Bardanyan
- Anton Jenterejyan
- Armen Poghosyan
- Ruben Sinanyan
- Igor Taplashvili

=== Arts: ===
- Vahagn Davtyan
- Razmik Davoyan
- Akhavni Grigoryan
- Khachatur Avetisyan
- Eduard Tatevosyan
- Suren Akhnazaryan
- Yakov Papayan
- Feliks Simonyan
- Eduard Isabekyan
- Sergey Bagdasaryan
- Albert Mkrtchyan
- Rudolf Vatinyan
- Gala Novents
- Rafel Babayan
- Frunzik Mkrtchyan
- Tigran Mansuryan
- Artavazd Peleshyan
- Artur Tarkhanyan
- Jorj Shkhlyan
- Mkrtich Mazmanyan
- Sergey Bagdasaryan
- Vladimir Grigoryan
- Grach Pogosyan
- Yurik Mantashyan
- Sashur Kalashyan
- Avetik Mirijanyan
- Sasun Grigoryan
- Lavrenty Barsegyan
- Aram Grigoryan
- Artem Sarkisyan
- Nvard Parnasyan
- Ashot Kazaryan
- Vanush Khanamiryan
- Emma Tsaturyan
- Yervan Kazanchyan
- Grachik Ashugyan

== 1988 ==
=== Socialist labor competition ===
- Valter Amazaspyan
- Gnelik Danielyan
- Lazirov Manukyan
- Sedrak Nikogosyan
- Grisha Mkrtchyan
- Bella Simikyan
- Mnatsakan Sukiasyan
- Yerjanik Akopyan
- Alvina Vatyan
- Gevork Shaginyan
- Armenak Petrosyan
- Norik Avdalyan
- Ararat Khachatryan
- Ivan Karaev
- Said Isoyan

=== Sciences: ===
- Viktor Ambartsumian
- Makich Arzumanyan
- Abel Simonyan
- Javad Torosyan
- Hayk Khachatryan
- Gevorg Jahukyan
- Nikolai Oganesyan
- Karlen Adamyan
- Rafael Mikaelyan
- Arkady Babayan
- Galina Burnazyan
- Gayane Khachaturian
- Gayane Tiroyan
- Akop Akopyan
- Levon Grigoryan
- Genrikh Krengel
- Lazar Martirosyan
- Tomik Sarkisyan
- Koryun Sevoyan
- Vigen Ter-Israelyan
- Khachik Sharoyan
- Jonik Asatryan
- Aslanbi Abidov
- Rafik Ambaryan
- Mishik Bagdasaryan
- Rolan Muradyan
- Semyon Akhumyan
- Yelizaveta Ter-Antonyants
- Viktor Chituni

=== Arts: ===
- Khachik Dashtents
- Silva Kaputikyan
- Gurgen Mahari
- Ruben Aharonyan
- Svetlana Navasardyan
- Ovik Akhverdyan
- Kim Bakshi
- Ashot Movsesyan
- Sos Sargsyan
- Sergei Parajanov
- Khoren Abrahamyan
- Stepan Pogosyan
- Robert Mavisakalyan
- Zori Balayan

== See also ==
- List of recipients of the State Hamza Prize
- Shota Rustaveli Prize
