= List of Armenian films of the 1970s =

This is a list of films released in the 1970s produced in Armenia SSR or directed by Armenian directors or about Armenia or Armenians, ordered by year of release:

Title	Director	Cast	Genre	Notes
1970
1971
1972
1973
1974
1975
Bride from the North	Nerses Hovhannisyan	Inna Makarova; Yuri Medvedev; Natalia Bespalova; Ara Babajanyan	Musical Comedy	
1976
1977
Նահապետ; Nahapet	Henrik Malyan	Sos Sargsyan; Frunzik Mkrtchyan; Sofik Sarkisyan; Alexander Arutunian	Drama, History	based on Hrant Matevosyan's novel
1978
1979
Mulberry	L. Davtyan; Genady Melkonyan	Razmik Aroyan; Leonid Sarkisov; Nona Petrosyan; Tamar Hovhannisyan		based on Zorayr Khalapyan's novel

== See also ==
- List of Soviet films
