= Yerevan State Institute of Theatre and Cinematography =

Public university in Yerevan, Armenia

Yerevan State Theatre and Film Institute
- Երևանի թատրոնի և կինոյի պետական ինստիտուտ
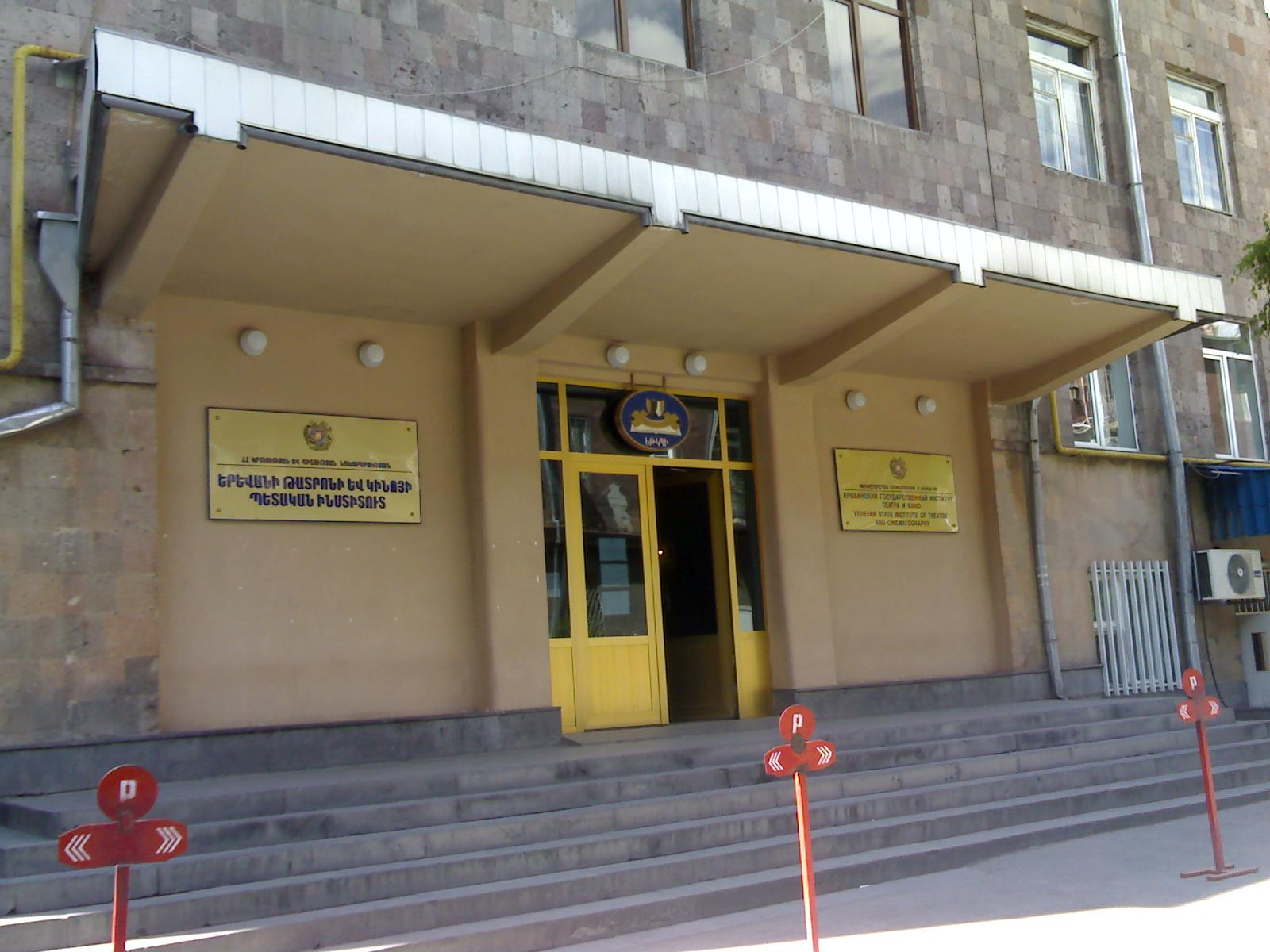
- Other names: YSTFI
- Former names: Yerevan State Institute of Theatrical Arts (1944–1952), Yerevan State Institute of Theatre and Fine Arts (1953–1994), Yerevan State Institute of Theatre Arts (1994–1999)
- Type: public
- Established: 1944; 82 years ago
- Rector: Sara Nalbandyan
- Location: Yerevan, Armenia; Gyumri, Armenia; Vanadzor, Armenia; Goris, Armenia
- Website: ystfi.am

The Yerevan State Theatre and Film Institute (YSTFI; Armenian: Երևանի թատրոնի և կինոյի պետական ինստիտուտ) is a state university and higher education institution headquartered in Yerevan, the capital of Armenia. Due to a series of mergers and restructuring events, the school was formerly known as Yerevan State Institute of Theatrical Arts (1944–1952), Yerevan State Institute of Theatre and Fine Arts (1953–1994), and Yerevan State Institute of Theatre Arts (1994–1999).

== History ==
Theater in Armenia has a centuries-old history and dates back to pagan rituals, for example, worship of death and resurrection of God Gisane – Ara the Beautiful and celebration of coming of spring in honor of fertility and healing goddess Anahit. Armenian tragedy dzajnarku-gusan and vohbergak, comedy genre katakergak and kataka-gusan, known from 1 century b.c., served as a base for further development of professional theater.

The institute was established in 1944, as the Yerevan State Institute of Theatrical Arts; it replaced the Nemirovich–Danchenko Theatre School (named for Vladimir Nemirovich-Danchenko). From 1944 until 1953, the institute was headed by Vavik Vartanian, the school rector. At the time of the founding, the institute had three departments: acting skills, directing, and drama studies. Starting in 1950 the number of enrollees had been declining because of the World War II.

In 1953, the institute was merged with the Art Institute (or State Academy of Fine Arts of Armenia), and was renamed the Yerevan State Institute of Theatre and Fine Arts.

In 1994 after Armenian Independence Day and due to political changes, the government decided to split the institute into two separate institutions, the State Academy of Fine Arts of Armenia and the Yerevan State Institute of Theater.

In 1999, it was restructured again and became known as the Yerevan State Theatre and Film Institute, with a major expansion in its degree offerings.

== Degrees ==
The university has 12 main degrees:

- Acting: actor or actress in drama or musical theater, pantomime, puppetry, television and circus.
- Stage direction: theater director, film director
- Dance
- Cinematography: film director, director of documentaries, animation film director, filmmaker, TV director, sound engineer
- Drama studies
- Film studies
- Literature
- Operator
- Visual arts: scenography, art director, multiplication
- Socio-cultural work (art management)
- Digital art, computer architecture
- Costume design
- and several minor specialties

== Educational programs ==
As of 2015, 795 students are enrolled in the head university and 214 students in the branches. The university has two options of educational process for two-level degree (bachelor and master, 4 and 2 years accordingly):

- full-time
- extramural.

There are also postgraduate studies (full-time and extramural).

The institute collaborates with several international universities. Students participate in state and international art competitions, festivals and often become laureates and prize-winners.

Since 1961 international students including Armenians from the diaspora (from Russia, United States, Georgia, Syria, Lebanon, Iran, Jordan, Bulgaria, etc.) enroll at the university.

The educational process is organized in specialized auditoriums, workshops, pavilions, cinema and video halls. There are 225 places in student theater. This is repertory theater, that operates all year round. The institutes hold a rich collection of more than 40,000 specialized books in its library, as well as films and videos. The institute publishes a monthly journal Handes (Armenian: «Հանդես») that includes scientific and methodological articles of professors and students.

== Branches ==
The institute has branches in three cities of the Republic:

- Gyumri
- Vanadzor
- Goris

=== The Institute in Gyumri ===
The Gyumri Branch was founded by the governmental decision No.231 in 1997. It is the only higher educational institution in the field of theater working in the Shirak Province.

Educational process is held on the following specialties:

- acting (actor in drama theatre and cinema)
- director of drama theater
- TV director
- camera operator (cinema operator)
- choreography
- scenography (set decorator)

Around 110 students are studying in the university (both full-time and extramural). Since 2007–2008 academic year the university provides two-stage educational programs – bachelor's and master's degree. The university implemented academic credit system. Educational process is organized based on plans and programs approved by the head university and in compliance with the up-to-date regulations.

Chairs:

- Acting and directing
- Cinematography
- Art history
- Social sciences

Substantial part of educational process is student theater. The institute hold specialized competitions – scenic speech, singing, dance, “best duet acting”, “best directing work”, “best photography.” After completing courses students find jobs in Gyumri Drama Theater named after V. Ajemian, Gyumri Puppetry Theater named after S. Alikhanian, tele and radio companies. Many students continue their education in post-graduate programs. There is a preparatory department.

=== The Institute in Vanadzor ===
The Vanadzor Branch was founded by the governmental decision No.1283 in 2003. Specialties:

- Acting – 6 students
- Directing – 6 students

In the 2005–2006 academic year, the department of cinematography was opened. In 2008–2009, the departments of choreography and camera operator, in 2010–2011, art administration and in 2011-2012 masters programs in the fields of acting, directing and cinematography were opened.

By 2012, 55 students and in 2012 – 16 students have graduated from the institute. Currently 78 students are enrolled in the university.

=== The Institute in Goris ===
The Goris branch was founded by the governmental decision No.547 in 2004. In 2007 the institute was registered.

Educational process is held on the following specialties:

- Acting
- Directing
- Choreography
- Camera operator.

First application process was held only at the acting department. In 2004–2005 academic year 10 students enrolled in the institute, 2005-2006 – 9 students, 2006-2007 – 5 students, 2007-2008 – 8 students, 2008-2009 – 4 students, 2009-2010 – 7 students, 2010-2011 – 4 students, 2011-2012 – 12 students. Now 25 students are studying in the institute.

The following performances were stages as final works:

- Christmas at the Cupiello's House – Eduardo De Filippo
- Hello Out There!, The Ping-Pong Players, The Hungerers - William Saroyan
- The Miracle Child – Z. Khalatyan
- Midnight robber – M. Mitrovich
- Listen to the tsar, Master and Servant, A Cat and A Dog that were based on the fairy-tales written by Hovannes Tumanyan
- Foreign Fiance, When There is no Eyes in the House - Aramashot Papayan
- The Colonel Bird – Hristo Boychev

At the theater festival in Lori, students of the university took prizes in following categories:

- Best ensemble
- Best young actor
- Best young actress

== Notable people and rectorate ==
Academic staff of the university includes best artists of the Republic, who are known not only in the country but even far beyond – popular artists, laureates of international contests, State Prizes in addition to 39 professors, 38 docents, 102 lecturers and teachers.

=== Rectors ===
- Vavik Vartanian (1949–1953)
- Ara Sargsyan (1953–1959)
- Martin Zarian (1959–19(?))
- Vaagn Mkrtchian (19(?)–1994)
- Vahe Shahverdian (1994–1997)
- Sos Sargsyan (1997–2005)
- Hrachya Gasparian (2005–2010)
- Armen Mazmanyan (2010–2014)
- David Muradian (2014–2018)
- Lilit Arzumanyan (2018–2023)
- Sara Nalbandyan (2023–present)

=== Notable academic staff and alumnus ===
Over the years several well-known artists taught in the university or some of the alumnus became prominent artists including Victor Abajian, Khoren Abrahamyan, Vagharsh Vagharshian, Armen Gulakian, Aleksey Djivelegov, Vahram Zaryan, Karen Kocharyan, Henrik Malyan, Yervand Manaryan, Gudj Manukyan, Frunzik Mkrtchyan, Vladimir Msryan, Edvard Muradyan, Nerses Hovhannisyan, Michael Poghosyan, Sabir Rizayev, Metaksia Simonyan, Tigran Shamirhanyan, Arthur Elbakyan and Edgar Elbakyan.
