= List of Armenian films of the 1950s =

This is a list of films released in the 1950s produced in Armenia SSR or directed by Armenians or about Armenia or Armenians, ordered by year of release.

Title	Director	Cast	Genre	Notes
1950
The Girl of Ararat Valley	Hamo Beknazarian	Avet Avetisyan; Gen (G. Shahnazaryan); S. Kevorkov		
Soviet Armenia	Hamo Beknazarian; Levon Isahakyan; Erazm Karamyan		Documentary	
The Second Caravan	Hamo Beknazarian	Ruben Simonov		Unfinished.
1951
1952
Waters of Sevan	Laert Vagharshyan; Grigori Melik-Avakyan		Documentary	A short.
1953
1954
The Secret of a Mountain Lake	A. Row	G. Gabrielyan; Ye. Harutyunyan; V. Danielyan		
1955
Новоселье (The New House)	Hamo Beknazarian	Nazira Alieva; Nelya Ataullaeva; Shukur Burkhanov	Drama	
Ghosts Leave the Peaks	Stepan Kevorkov; Erazm Karamyan	S. Sosyan; V. Yutujyan; V. Papazyan		
Trifle	Grigori Melik-Avakyan	L. Dovyatlan; M. Kostanyan; H. Harutyunyan		A short.
Ոսկե ցլիկ (Golden Bull Calf)	Moko Hakobyan	Gurgen Gabrielyan; Ashot Nersisyan; Myra Paronikyan	Comedy	A short.
Looking for the Addressee	Yuri Yerznkyan	S. Sosyan; L. Shagalova; Khor Abrahamyan	Comedy	
1956
Visiting the Groom	Laert Vagharshyan	Hrachia Nersisyan; A. Asryan; T. Saryan		A short.
The Heart Sings	Grigori Melik-Avagyan	A. Aydinyan; Hrachia Nersisyan; V. Papazyan		
Along the Path of Thunder	Stepan Kevorkov; Erazm Karamyan	V. Medvedev; G. Suprunova; G. Janibekyan		
Պատվի համար (For Honor)	Artashes Hay-Artyan	Hrachia Nersisyan; Avet Avetisyan; Varduhi Varderesyan	Drama	
Captives of Hovazadzor	Yuri Yerznkyan	O. Buniatyan; G. Khazhakyan; A. Nersisyan	Adventure	
When Friends are with You	G. Sarkisov	Z. Atanesyan; A. Nersisyan		
1957
On Whom Life Smiles	Levon Isahakyan	M. Simonyan; L. Hovhannisyan; L. Tukhikyan		
Անձամբ ճանաչում եմ (Personally Known, Knowing in Person or Kamo)	Erazm Karamyan; Stepan Kevorkov	Boris Smirnov; Maria Pastukhova; Gurgen Tonunts	Action	First part of a trilogy about the Armenian revolutionary Simon Ter-Petrosyan.
Մոր սիրտը (Mother's Heart)	Grigori Melik-Avakyan	Varduhi Varderesyan; H. Harutyunyan; R. Mikaelyan	Drama	
1958
Առաջին սիրո երգը (The Song of the First Love)	Yuri Yerznkyan; Laert Vagharshyan	Khoren Abrahamyan; Hrachia Nersisyan; Vagharsh Vagharshyan	Romantic musical	
Ինչու է աղմկում գետը (What's All the Noise of the River About?)	Grigori Melik-Avakyan	Hrachia Nersisyan; Avet Avetisyan; Frunze Dovlatyan	Drama	
Իմ ընկերոջ մասին (About My Friend)	Yuri Yerznkyan	Khoren Abrahamyan; Yulian Panich; Tatyana Piletskaya	Drama	
1959
Collapse	G. Sarkisov	T. Kokova; Khor. Abrahamyan; I. Hayriyan		
A Jump Over the Precipice	Levon Isahakyan	B. Nersisyan; G. Janibekyan; V. Varderesyan		
Նրա երևակայությունը (Her Fantasy / Sober Wine)	Stepan Kevorkov	Elvira Brunovskaya; L. Shirinyan; A. Soghomonyan	Comedy	
01-99	Amasi Martirosyan	Mher Mkrtchyan; Murad Kostanyan; Arman Kotikyan	Comedy	A short film.
Strange Trace	Zhirayr Avetsiyan	Khoren Abrahamyan; G. Ashughyan; M. Manukyan		

== See also ==
- Armenfilm, a production unit of the Soviet State Cinema Organisation
- List of Soviet films
