= Anahit Ananyan =

Armenian agronomist (1909–1987)

- Անահիտ Անանյան
- Born: 27 August 1909; Poghoskilisa, Elizavetpol Governorate, Russian Empire
- Died: September 1987 (aged 78)
- Occupation: Agronomist
- Awards: Order of Lenin (1966 and 1971); Hero of Socialist Labour (1971)

Academic work
- Discipline: Agronomy
- Sub-discipline: Tomato cultivars
- Institutions: Republican Selection Station for Vegetable, Melon, and Cucumber Crops of the Armenian SSR

Anahit Arshaki Ananyan (Armenian: Անահիտ Արշակի Անանյան; 27 August 1909 – September 1987) was a Soviet Armenian agronomist who developed tomato cultivars, one of which reached popularity. She received the Order of Lenin and Hero of Socialist Labour for her services to agricultural progress in the five-year plans of the Soviet Union.

== Biography ==
Ananyan was born on 27 August 1909 in Poghoskilisa in the Elizavetpol Governorate, and she graduated from the V.I. Lenin Georgian Polytechnical Institute Faculty of Agriculture in 1926. She obtained her doctorate in agricultural sciences in 1966.

Ananyan joined the Republican Selection Station for Vegetable, Melon, and Cucumber Crops of the Armenian SSR in 1933. She served as director of that institution from 1949 until 1984. She later started the Republican Seed Breeding Station in Darakert, and her collection became the basis of the database of the station, now the Scientific Center of Vegetable and Industrial Crops. Svetlana Hayrapetyan, a tomato cultivar breeder who studied under Ananyan, recalled that she found it "a great joy" to work with her, noting "many young scientists wanted to be like her, trying to obtain knowledge from her and be present during her scientific experiments".

In 1944, Ananyan created a tomato cultivar named Anahit 20, which became popular due to its rich nature; Gayane Ghazaryan said that this marked the beginning of Armenia's tomato heritage. She co-wrote with Aram Yeghyazaryan and Albert Grigoryan the book Armenia's Practice of Vegetable Preserve Making (1965). Other tomato cultivars developed by her include Araks 322, Echmiadzin 260, Haykakan Shtambov 152, Hobelyanakan 261, Karine 388, Masis 202, Yerevan 14, and Zvartnots.

Ananyan was awarded the Order of Lenin in 1966 "for obtaining high yields of vegetable and melon crops obtained under her leadership according to the results of the seven-year plan”. She was awarded Honoured Scientist of the Armenian SSR in 1967, as well as Honoured Agronomist of the Armenian SSR, In 1971, she was named Hero of Socialist Labour (in addition to getting a second Order of Lenin award and a "Hammer and Sickle" gold medal) for "outstanding successes achieved in the development of agricultural production and the fulfillment of the five-year plan for the sale of agricultural and livestock products to the state." She had previously been awarded the Order of the Badge of Honour in 1945.

Ananyan was a resident of Yerevan. She was a relative of writer Vakhtang Ananyan.

Ananyan died in September 1987 and was buried in Shahumyan Cemetery.
