= Mazmanyan =

Mazmanyan (in Armenian Մազմանյան) is an Armenian surname. Its variant in Western Armenian is Մազմանեան or Mazmanian.

Mazmanyan / Mazmanian may refer to

- Armen Mazmanyan (1960–2014), Armenian theater director and actor and rector of the Yerevan State Institute of Theater and Cinema
- Art Mazmanian, (1927–2019), American baseball coach and manager
- Big John Mazmanian (1926–2006), American NHRA drag racer.
- Yertward Mazamanian or Mazmanian (1924–2010), widely known as "Eight Finger Eddie", American hippie of Armenian descent, who was credited with popularizing Goa, India as a tourist destination from the mid-1960s onward
