= Vagharsh Vagharshian =

Soviet actor (1894–1959)

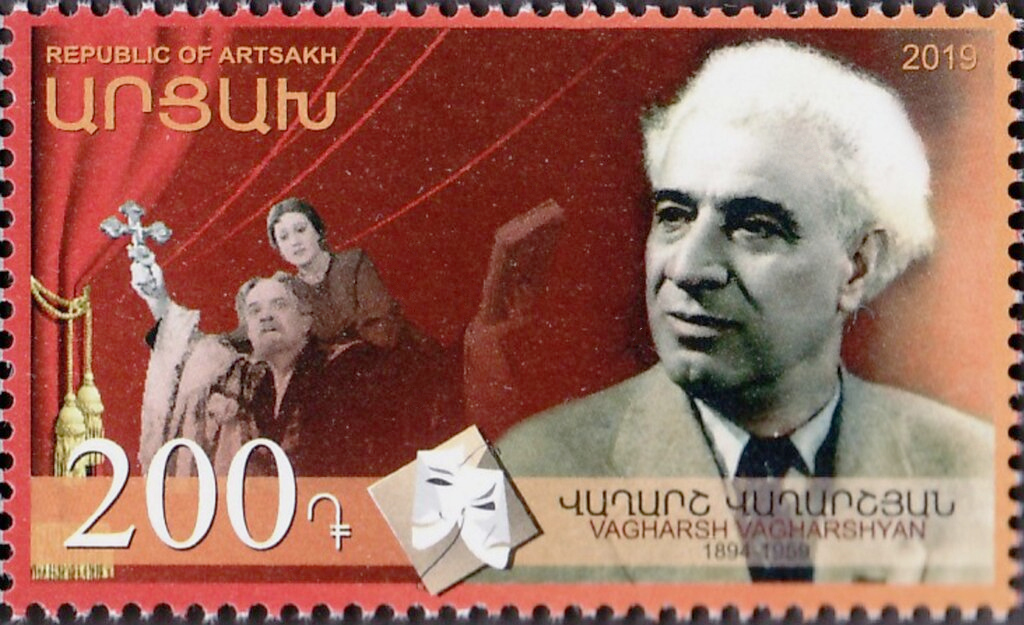
- Vagharshian on a 2019 stamp of Artsakh
- Born: 14 February 1894; Shusha
- Died: 6 May 1959 (aged 65); Moscow, Soviet Union
- Awards: Stalin Prize (1941, 1952); Order of Lenin (1956); Order of the Red Banner of Labour

Vagharsh Bogdani Vagharshian (14 February 1894 – 6 May 1959) was a Soviet and Armenian actor, director, playwright and public figure. People's Artist of the USSR (1954).

Vagharshian graduated from a diocese school in Shusha and then worked with an Armenian theater crew in Baku, Azerbaijan. Since 1923 he performed at the Sundukyan State Academic Theatre. In 1941–1944 he was the artistic director of the theater and starred in a number of films. Since 1944 he taught acting at the Yerevan State Institute of Theatre and Cinematography. He was a deputy of the Supreme Council of USSR. The Song of First Love (1958) was Vagharshian's last film in which he acted.
