= Arthur Elbakyan =

Armenian actor, film producer and director

Arthur Elbakyan Արթուր Էլբակյան
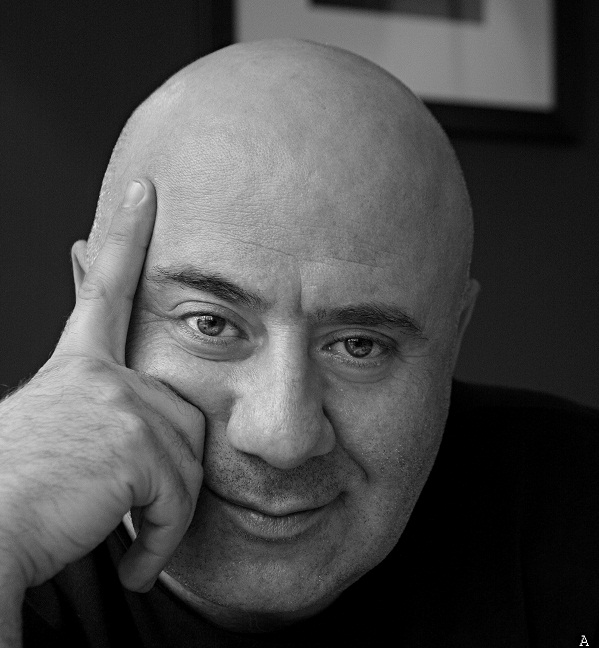
- Born: 10 February 1961 (age 64); Yerevan, Armenian SSR
- Occupation(s): actor, theater, movie, television director, television host, producer

Arthur Elbakyan (Armenian: Արթուր Էլբակյան; born February 10, 1961) is an Armenian actor, theater, movie, television director, television host, producer. Elbakyan has played over 30 leading roles and is author and host of over 100 television shows.

== Early life ==
Arthur Elbakyan was born on February 10, 1961, in Yerevan, Armenia. At a young age Elbakyan began playing football and National Youth Football Team of Armenia quickly identified his potential and he received an invitation to join the team. However, Elbakyan’s injury and one encounter in his life changed his career path. In 1978 Elbakyan met Hrachia Ghaplanyan, People’s Artist of USSR and artistic director of Sundukyan State Academic Theatre of Yerevan. For Elbakyan it was a turning point in choosing his career. Hrachia Ghaplanyan invited Elbakyan right away to study at Acting Theater-Studio of Yerevan State Theater after Gabriel Sundukyan as a sophomore student. Elbakyan was enrolled in People’s Artist of USSR Khoren Abrahamayn’s department. In 1980 Elbakyan graduated from the studio and in his graduation work he played the leading role of Zimzimov in G. Sundukyan’s “Pepo” play.

== Theatre ==
- 1980-1982 Elbakyan was the leading actor of Sundukyan State Academic Theatre of Yerevan.
- 1982-1984 – leading actor of Yerevan Experimental Theatre.
- 1984-1990 – leading actor of Yerevan Theatre of Young Spectator.
- 1985-1991 – studied at Yerevan Institute of Fine Arts and Theatre, majored in “Production Art” and received title of “Theatrical Director”.
- In 1985 Elbakyan was awarded Lenin Komsomol Prize for great achievements in arts.
- In 1985 Elbakyan took part in the XII World Festival of Youth and Students as a delegate from Armenia. Elbakyan was an honorable flag bearer of Armenian delegation.
- 1990 Elbakyan founded his own Theatre “13” where he was a director, an actor and artistic director. The first President of Armenia Levon Ter-Petrossian was present at the opening ceremony of Theater “13”.
- 1995-1996 – along with People’s Artists of Armenia Guzh Manukyan, Levon Tukhikyan, Vladimir Msryan Arthur Elbakyan founded ‘“Theatre Foundation”’.

== Television ==
- 1993-1995 - Elbakyan started It's Majesty Theater and Meetings television shows on National Television Channel of Armenia. Among the guests of the shows were the first president of Armenia Levon Ter-Petrosian, politician Zurab Zhvania, also such celebrity couples as Gohar Gasparyan and Tigran Levonyan, Syuzan Margaryan and Hrachya Harutyunyan and their daughter Sirusho.
- 1995-1996 – along with People’s Artists of Armenia Guzh Manukyan, Levon Tukhikyan, Vladimir Msryan Arthur Elbakyan founded ‘“Theatre Foundation”’.
- 1996-2000 – co-founder, vice-president of first independent television channel in Armenia "AR", author and anchor of numerous shows and documentaries, including Friday Nights I Can’t Sleep, Rendezvous.
- 1998 – Executive Producer of Humorous Radio Station “Armenian Radio” in Moscow, Russia.
- 1998-2000 – Special Correspondent of National Television Channel of Armenia in Moscow, Russia.

== Other ==
- 2002-2005 - advisor for London & Regional Properties in Russia and CIS countries.
- Since 2005 until now - author and director of films about various countries and cities – Israel, USA, Italy, London, Paris, Barcelona, etc.
- Arthur Elbakyan is a member of Theatre Worker’s Union of the Republic of Armenia since 1986.
