= Piano Trio (Babajanian) =

Piano Trio in F sharp minor is a piano trio by the Armenian composer Arno Babajanian. Composed in 1952, it received immediate acclaim catapulting Babajanian's career into the mainstream of Soviet arts.

== Structure ==
The trio is in three movements:

1. Largo
2. Andante
3. Allegro vivace

== Discography ==
Year	Trio	Record Label
2016	Lincoln Trio	Cedille Records
2024	Michael Guttman, Jing Zhao, Elena Lisitsian	Avanti Classic
