= David Malyan =

- Դավիթ Մալյան
- Born: April 17, 1904; Zaqatala, Russian Empire
- Died: July 17, 1976 (aged 72); Yerevan, Armenian SSR, Soviet Union
- Occupations: Actor, theater director and pedagogue
- Years active: 1926–1976
- Relatives: Henrik Malyan (nephew)

David Melkumovich Malyan (Armenian: Դավիթ Մալյան, 17 April 1904 – 17 July 1976) was a Soviet and Armenian film and stage actor, theater director and pedagogue.

== Education and career ==
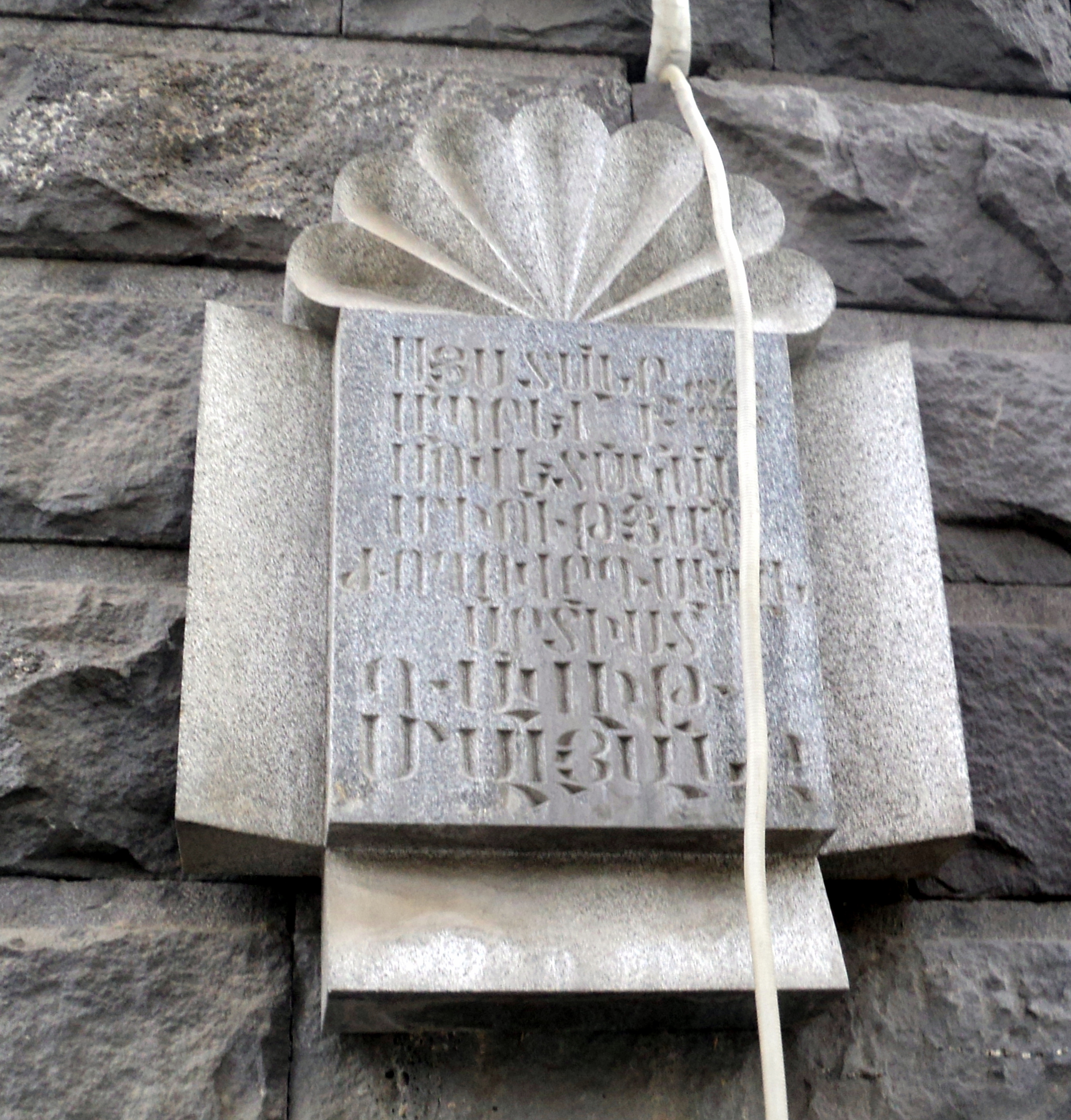
David Malyan's plaque in Yerevan

David Malyan studied at Armenian Drama studio in Tbilisi from 1922 to 1923 and worked in theaters in Yerevan, Tbilisi, Leninakan. He was one of the leading actors of the Sundukyan Drama Theatre of Yerevan since 1932.

== Awards ==
- Honored Artist of the Armenian SSR (1936)
- People's Artist of the Armenian SSR (1943)
- People's Artist of the USSR (1974)
- Two Stalin Prizes (1950, 1952)
- Two Orders of the Red Banner of Labour (1944, 1956)
- Medal "For the Defence of the Caucasus"
- Medal "For Valiant Labour in the Great Patriotic War 1941–1945"

== Filmography ==
- Shor and Shorshor (1926) – Satan
- Pepo (1935) – Kakuli
- Zangezur (1938) – Makich
- David Bek (1944) – Stepan Shaumian (voice dubbed by Alexander Khvylya)
