= Arno Babajanian =

Armenian composer (1921–1983)

Arno Babajanian Առնո Բաբաջանյան
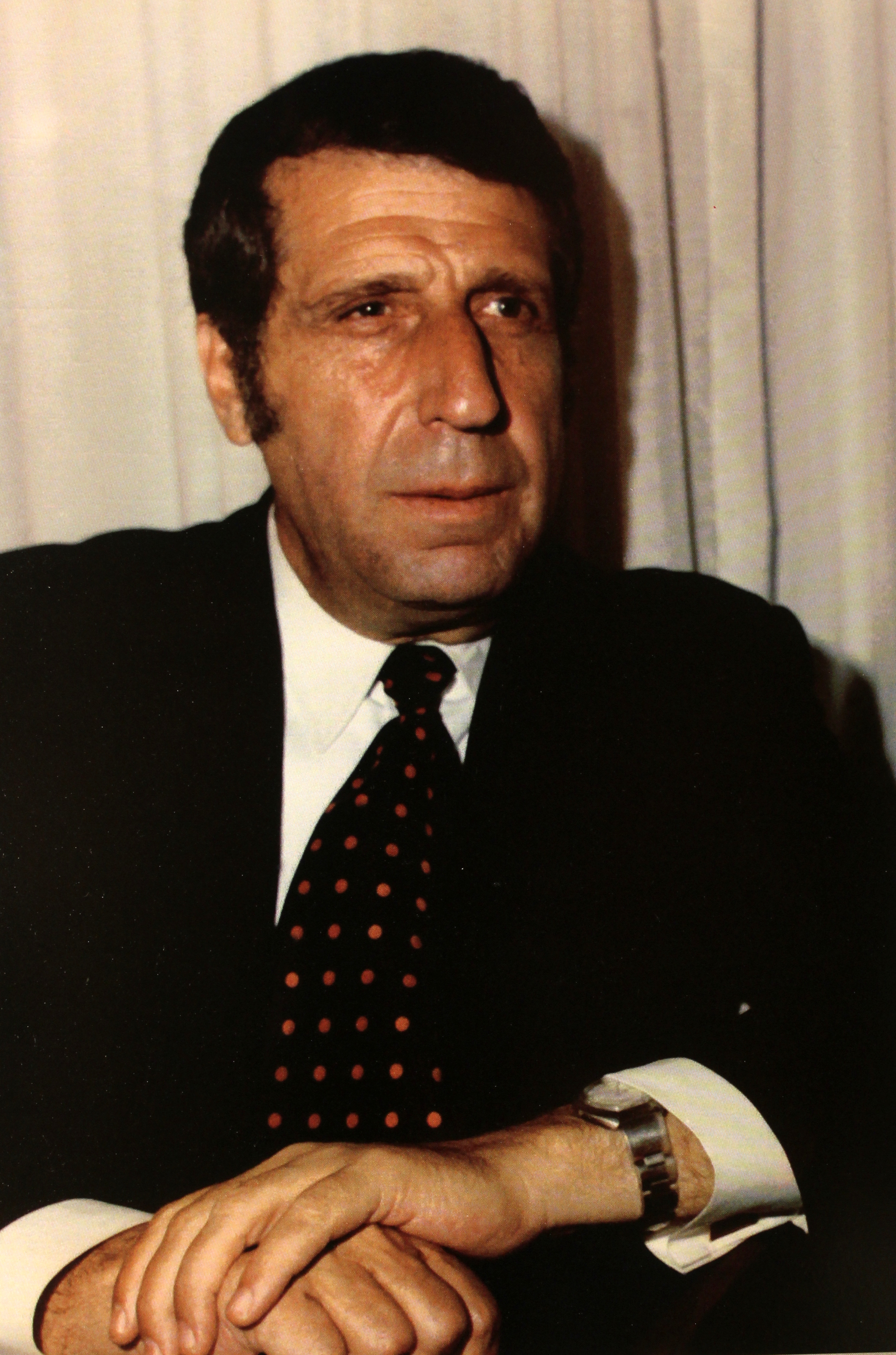

Background information
- Born: January 22, 1921; Yerevan, Armenian SSR, Soviet Union
- Died: November 11, 1983 (aged 62) Moscow, Russian SFSR, Soviet Union
- Occupations: Composer, pianist
- Instrument: Piano
- Years active: 1952 – 1983

Arno Harutyuni Babajanian (Note: Armenian: Առնո Հարությունի Բաբաջանյան, romanized: Aṙno Harowt’yowni Babaǰanyan; Russian: Арно Арутюнович Бабаджанян, romanized: Arno Arutyunovich Babadzhanyan) (January 22, 1921 – November 11, 1983) was a Soviet and Armenian composer and pianist. He was made a People's Artist of the USSR in 1971.

== Biography ==
Babajanian was born in Yerevan on January 22, 1921. By age 5, his musical talent was apparent, and the composer Aram Khachaturian suggested that the boy be given proper music training. Two years later, in 1928, Babajanian entered the Komitas State Conservatory of Yerevan. In 1938, he continued his studies in Moscow with Vissarion Shebalin.

He later returned to Yerevan, where from 1950 to 1956 he taught at the conservatory. In 1952, he wrote the Piano Trio in F-sharp minor. It received immediate acclaim and was regarded as a masterpiece from the time of its premiere. Subsequently, he undertook concert tours throughout the Soviet Union and Europe. In 1971, he was named the People's Artist of the USSR.

Babajanian wrote in various musical genres, including many popular songs in collaboration with leading poets such as Yevgeny Yevtushenko and Robert Rozhdestvensky. Much of his music is rooted in Armenian folk music and folklore, which he generally uses in the virtuosic style of Rachmaninoff and Khachaturian. His later works were influenced by Prokofiev and Bartók. Praised by Dmitri Shostakovich as a "brilliant piano teacher", Babajanian was also a noted pianist and often performed his own works in concerts.

== List of principal works ==
=== Piano works ===
==== for piano solo ====
- Prelude (1939)
- Vagharshapat dance (1943)
- Impromptu (1944)
- Polyphonic sonata (1946, rev. 1956)
- Capriccio (1952)
- Six pictures (1963–64)
- Poem (1965)
- Meditation (1969)
- Melody and Humoresque (1970)
- Elegy (1978)

==== for two pianos ====
- Dance (1942)
- Armenian Rhapsody (1950, co-composed by Alexander Arutiunian)
- Festive (1960, includes percussive instruments. Co-composed by Alexander Arutiunian)

=== Works for solo instrument and piano ===
- Violin sonata (1958)
- Air and Dance for Cello (1961)

=== Chamber works ===
- String quartet No. 1 (1938-43)
- String quartet No. 2 (1947-48, incomplete)
- Piano Trio in F sharp minor (1952)
- String quartet No. 3 (1975-76)

=== Orchestral works ===
- Poem-rhapsody (1954, rev. 1960 and 1980)
- March of the Soviet Police (1977)

==== Concerto ====
- Piano concerto (1944)
- Violin concerto (1948-49)
- "Heroic ballade" for piano and orchestra (1950)
- Cello concerto (1959-62)

==== Ballet pieces ====
- "Parvana" (Парвана) (1954–56; incomplete, probably lost)
- "Stellar symphony" (Звездная симфония) (1960)
- "Umbrellas" (Зонтики)
- "Sensation" (Сенсация)
- "Dance Suite" (Танцевальная сюита) (1971)

==== Pieces for stage orchestra ====
- In Karlovy Vary (1959)
- Armenian Lipsi (1960)
- Rhythmic dance (1961)
- Come to Yerevan (1961)
- Festive Yerevan (1977)
- Dvin (1979)
- Nocturne (Concert piece for piano and orchestra) (1980)
- Dreams (Concert piece for piano and orchestra) (1982)

=== Film scores ===
- Looking for the addressee (В поисках адресата) (1955)
- Path of thunder (Тропою грома) (1956)
- Personally known (Лично известен) (1957)
- The Song of First Love (Песня первой любви) (1958)
- A Groom from the Other World (Жених с того света) (1958)
- Bride from the North (Невеста с севера) (1975)
- My heart is in the Highlands (В горах мое сердце) (1975)
- Baghdasar's divorce (Багдасар разводится с женой) (1976)
- Chef contest (Приехали на конкурс повара) (1977)
- The flight starts from the Earth (Полет начинается с земли) (1980)
- The mechanics of happiness (Механика счастья) (1982)

=== Songs (over 200 in total; selection) ===
- "Nocturne" ("Ноктюрн", originally for piano and orchestra)
- "Bring me back the music" (""Верни мне музыку")
- "Beauty queen" ("Королева красоты")
- "Wedding" ("Свадьба")
- "Best city in the world" ("Лучший город Земли"), originally performed by Jean Tatlian and made a classic by Muslim Magomayev
- "Grateful to you" ("Благодарю тебя")
- "Ferris wheel" ("Чертово колесо")
- "Heart on snow" ("Сердце на снегу")
- "The blue taiga" ("Голубая тайга")
- "Dum spiro, spero" (Пока я помню, я живу)
- "Aria-vocalise" (Ария-вокализ)

== Honors, prizes and medals ==
- 1935 - First two prizes for two songs dedicated to the 15th anniversary of Soviet Armenia
- 1937 - First prize for the best performance of Alexander Glazunov's Piano Variations at Yerevan Conservatoire
- 1939 - First prize for the best performance of works by Soviet composers
- 1945 - Medal "for defence of the Caucasus"
- 1945 - Medal "for valiant labour"
- 1947 - Second prize for three piano pieces (or the Piano Concerto) at the 1st World Festival of Youth and Students in Prague
- 1951 - Stalin Prize, third degree, for the "Heroic Ballade" for piano and orchestra
- 1953 - Second prize for the song "Fly Aloft the Friendship Banner" at the 2nd World Festival of Youth and Students in Bucharest
- 1956 - Order of the Red Banner of Labour
- 1956 - Honored Artist of the Armenian SSR
- 1962 - People's Artist of the Armenian SSR
- 1967 - Armenian SSR State prize for "6 pictures" for piano solo
- 1971 - People's Artist of the USSR
- 1973 - Best composer's award at the 2nd Tokyo Music Festival for the song "Ferris wheel"
- 1973 - Honorable citizen of two cities in Texas
- 1981 - Order of Lenin
- 1983 (posthumously) - Armenian SSR State prize for the OST for the film "Mechanics of happiness"

A minor planet, 9017 Babadzhanyan, was named after him.

A Boeing 777-300ER of the Russian airline Aeroflot, was named after him.

== Legacy ==
Babajanian is widely regarded as one of the greatest composers of the Soviet era.

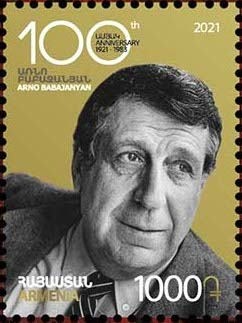
Babajanian on an Armenian stamp

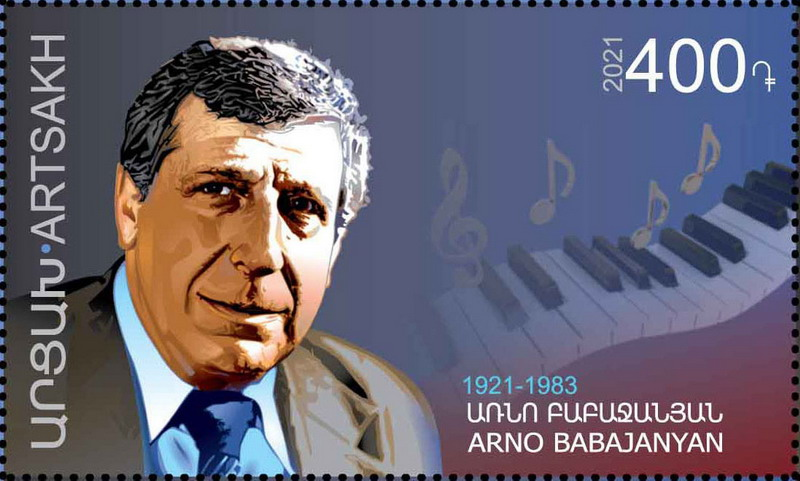

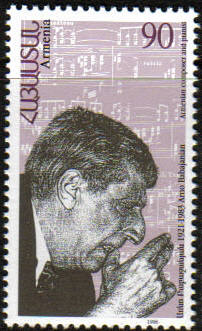

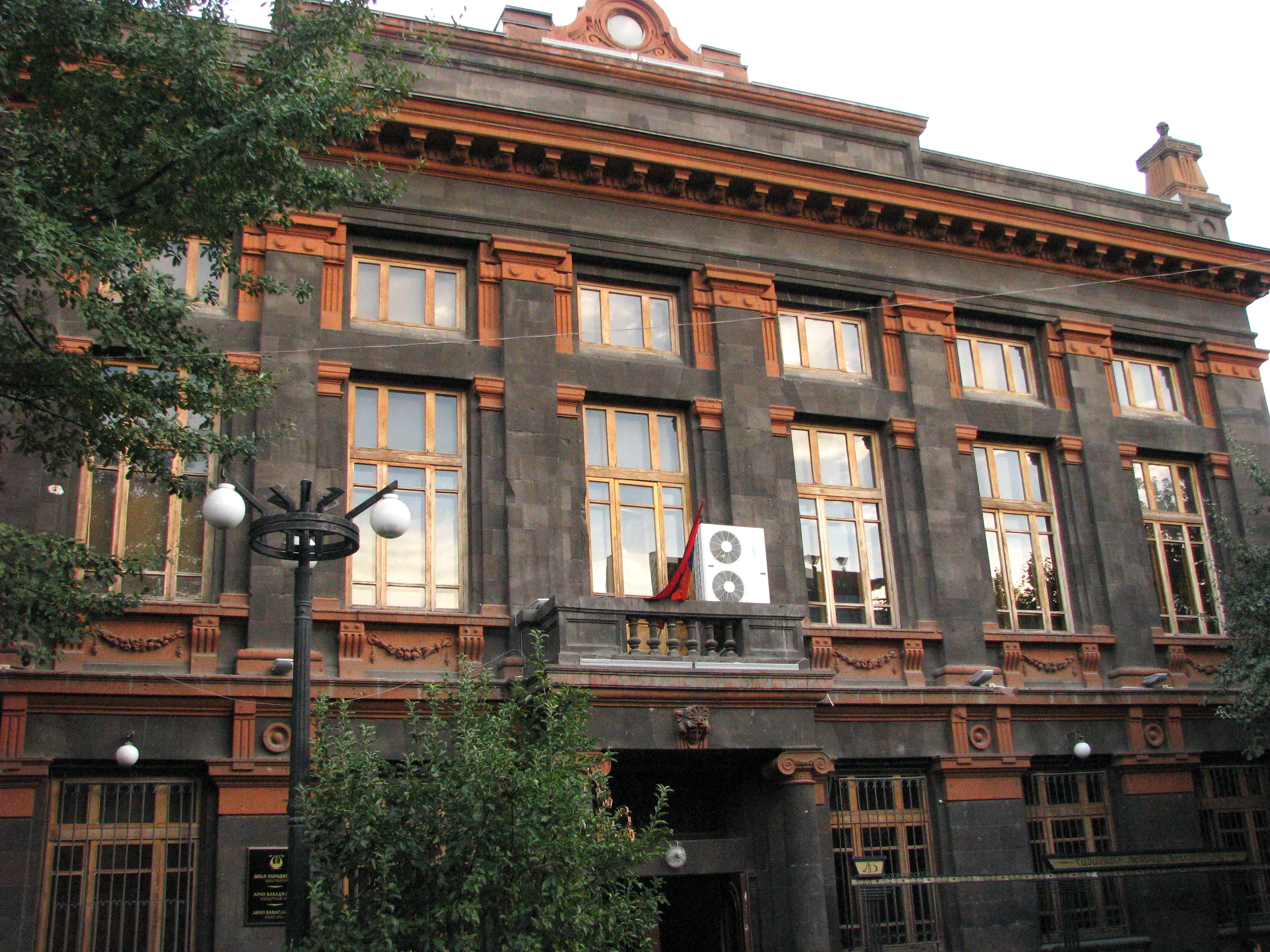
Arno Babajanian Concert Hall, Abovyan Street, Yerevan

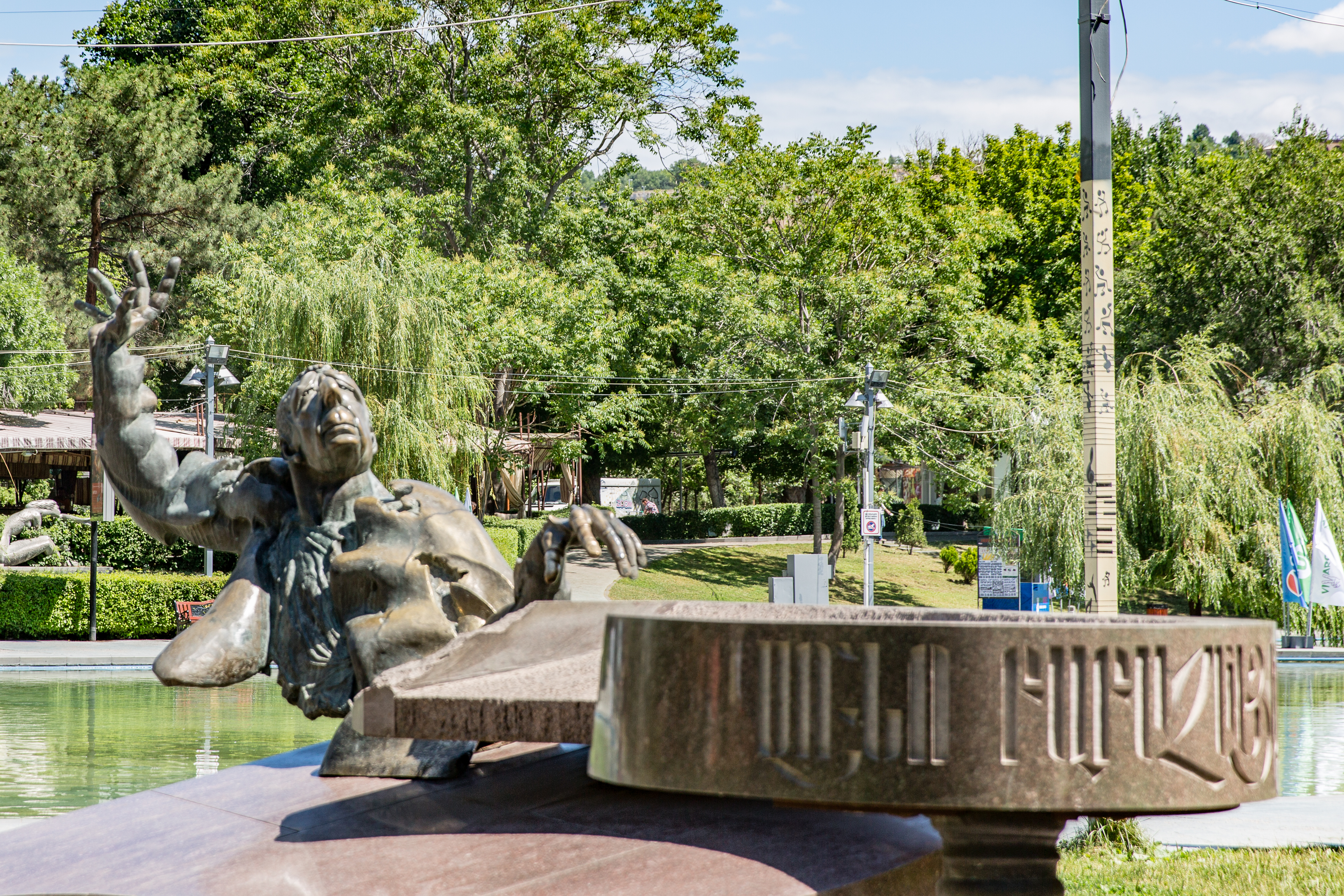
Babajanian's statue in Yerevan

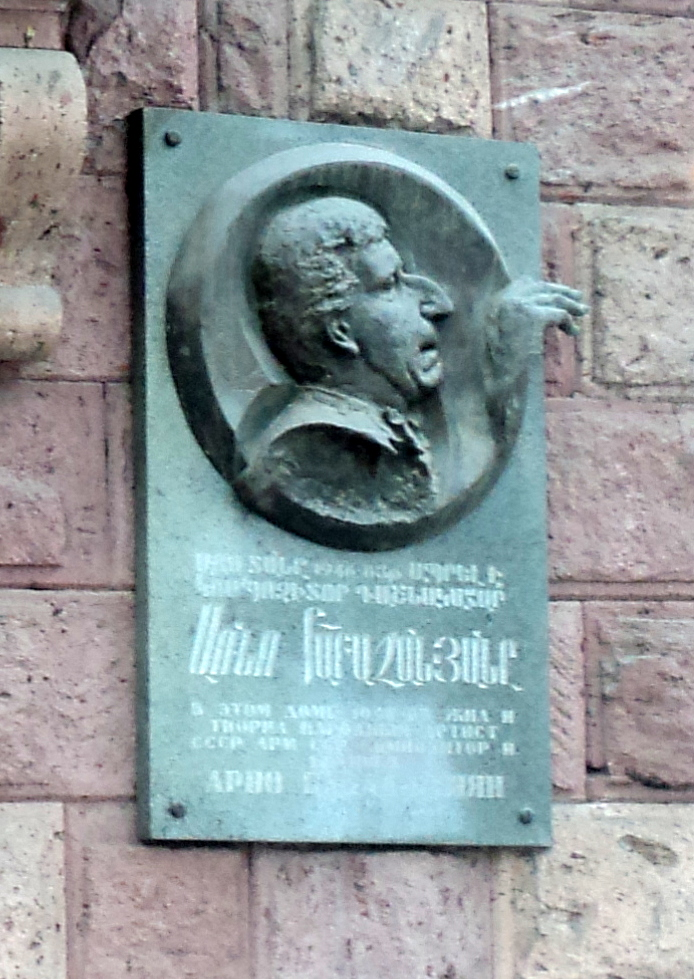
Arno Babajanian's plaque on Mashtots Avenue, Yerevan
