= Vakhtang Ananyan =

Armenian writer

- Born: 26 July 1905; Poghoskilisa, Elizavetpol Governorate, Russian Empire
- Died: 4 March 1980 (aged 74); Yerevan, Armenian SSR, Soviet Union
- Occupation: writer

Vakhtang Stepani Ananyan (Armenian: Վախթանգ Ստեփանի Անանյան; 26 July 1905 – 4 March 1980) was an Armenian writer and journalist. He wrote many works about hunting and Armenia's natural world. In 1967, he was awarded the title Honored Figure of Culture of the Armenian SSR, and in 1971 he was awarded the State Prize of the Armenian SSR.

== Biography ==
Ananyan was born in the village of Poghoskilisa, near Dilijan (now within the city limits). He studied at Dilijan's parish school. In 1926, he moved to Yerevan, where he worked for the newspapers Machkal (Ploughman, 1930–31) and Sots’ialistakan gyughatntestut’yun (Socialist agriculture, 1931–1935). His first work was published in the journal Pioner in 1927. In 1935, he was the editor of the newspaper Kolkhoznik. He fought in World War II and continued his journalistic and literary activities after the war.

His first novel Krake oghaki mej (In the ring of fire) was published in 1930. Ananyan is known for his hunting stories and his realistic descriptions of Armenia's natural world. Eight volumes of Ananyan's hunting stories were published in 1947–77 under the title Vorsordakan patmvatsk’ner (Hunting stories). Among his well-known works are the book Vors (Hunt, 1934) and the novella Sevani ap’in (On the banks of Sevan, 1951). His work Hayastani kendanakan ashkharhë (Animals of Armenia, 5 volumes, 1961–75) gives information about the animals that live or once lived in Armenia. His works have been translated into more than two dozen languages, including Russian, English, Chinese, Japanese, German, Czech, Bulgarian, Bengali, and Hindi. His books Sevani ap’in and Hovazadzori gerinerë (Prisoners of Hovazadzor, 1936) were adapted into the films Ler’nayin lchi gaghtnik’ë (Secret of the mountain lake, 1954) and Hovazadzori gerinerë (1957), respectively. In 1970, he was awarded the State Prize of the Armenian SSR for his works written for children and youths. He died in 1980 in Yerevan. A high school in Dilijan is named after him.

== See also ==
- List of Armenian SSR State Prize winners
