= Guys from the Army Band =

- Original Russian film poster
- Directed by: Henrik Malyan Henrik Margaryan
- Starring: Levon Tukhikyan Frunzik Mkrtchyan Armen Khostikyan Sos Sargsyan
- Production company: Armenfilm
- Release date: 1960
- Running time: 87 minutes
- Country: Soviet Union
- Languages: Armenian, Russian

Guys from the Army Band (Armenian: Նվագախմբի տղաները, Russian: Парни музкоманды) is a 1960 Soviet-Armenian comedy film directed by Henrik Malyan and Henrik Margaryan.

== Plot ==
Bolshevik Tsolak Darbinyan infiltrates the Dashnak Army as a musician of the Army music band. Despite the initial personal conflict with band leader Arsen, he is able to win the friendship of young band musicians, including Arsen, and to persuade them to back him on the eve of the Bolshevik invasion to Armenia.

== Cast ==
- Levon Tukhikyan - Tsolak Darbinyan
- Frunzik Mkrtchyan - Arsen
- Armen Khostikyan - Zaven
- Sos Sargsyan - Artashes
