= Jean Tatlian =

Soviet singer

Jean Tatlian (Armenian: Ժան Հարությունի Թաթլյան; alt. sp: Djan Tatlan; Russian: Жан Арутюнович Татлян; born 1 August 1943 in Thessaloniki, Greece) is a Soviet singer of Armenian ancestry. In the late 1960s he enjoyed great popularity in the USSR. He emigrated to France in 1971. Jean Tatlian considers himself the first chansonnier of the Soviet Union.

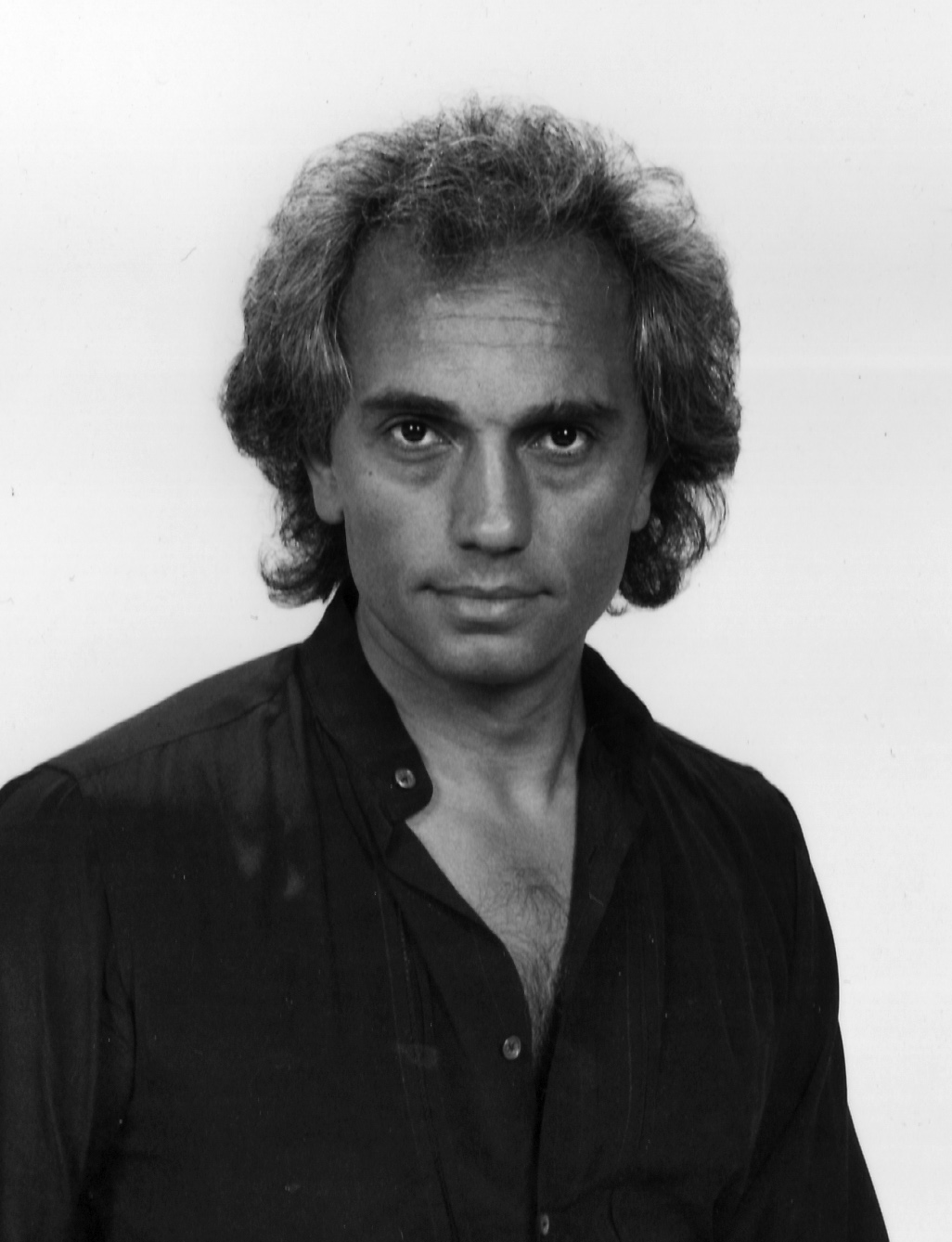
Jean Tatlian

== Biography ==
Tatlian was born in an Armenian family in Thessaloniki, Greece, on 1 August, 1943. He was the youngest of three children. In 1947 the family moved to the USSR, to the Armenian SSR and then to Abkhasia. As a schoolboy, Tatlian bought himself a guitar with money he earned from painting houses. He studied guitar at the Sukhumi Philharmonia and before the age of 16 was already earning money from concerts in nearby republics, in which he performed songs by French and Italian chansonniers. Later he studied in a workshop of variety art in Kiev, where the 19-year-old (not yet 18 according to other sources) was noticed by the conductor of the State Armenian Orchestra, Konstantin Orbelian, who invited him to join the orchestra as a soloist in a tour across Ukraine. Around the same time, in the early 1960s, he had his first success, with the song "Street Lamps" ("Уличные фонари"), for which a video was shot and shown on television. The song became popular. After a while Tatlian moved to Leningrad. He loved the city and lived there from then on. In Leningrad he founded his own orchestra and would give 350–400 concerts per year working with Lenconcert (a concert association that organized concerts in Leningrad) until the late 1960s. In the late 1960s and early 1970s, following a disagreement with a female director of the Orel Philharmony, Tatlian was effectively banned from any concert activity (and also, from the very beginning, he was de facto banned from leaving the Soviet Union), and in 1971 emigrated to France.

Among the songs Tatlian is most known for are: "Street Lamps" ("Уличные фонари"), "Autumn Light" ("Осенний свет"), "Song About Water Drops [During a Thaw]" ("Песня о капели"), "Old Tower" ("Старая башня"), "Starry Night" ("Звёздная ночь"), "Воздушные замки", "Бумажный голубь", "Осенние следы", "Ты поверь", "Самая красивая", "Свет маяка", "Ласточка". He also was the original performer of the song "Best City in the World" ("Лучший город Земли", about Moscow) composed by Arno Babajanian and best known for the version sung by Muslim Magomaev, who recorded it a year later.
