= Nahapet =

- Directed by: Henrik Malyan
- Written by: Henrik Malyan (writer)
- Starring: Sos Sargsyan; Frunzik Mkrtchyan; Sofik Sarkisyan; Guzh Manukyan
- Cinematography: Sergei Israelyan
- Edited by: H. Melkonyan
- Music by: Alexander Arutunian
- Distributed by: Armenfilm
- Release date: 27 November 1977
- Running time: 92 minutes
- Country: Soviet Union
- Languages: Armenian; Russian; English (with the title of Life Triumphs)

Nahapet (Armenian: Նահապետ) is a 1977 Soviet Armenian-language drama film about a man who tries to rebuild his life after losing his wife and child in the Armenian genocide. It is based on a novel written by Hrachya Qochar. The film has been cited as an example of the portrayal of genocide in the film industry. The film was screened in the Un Certain Regard section of the 1978 Cannes Film Festival.

== Plot ==
The film centres on the life of a strong-willed Armenian fighter Nahapet (Sos Sargsyan). In the horrors of the Armenian genocide, Nahapet (whose name means patriarch in Armenian) and others valiantly attempt to defend their village in Turkish Armenia from Ottoman troops but are soon overwhelmed. All his children and his wife, Manushak, are brutally beaten and killed whilst he is tied to a beam and forced to witness the destruction of his village.

Left for dead, Nahapet is able to make his way to a bleak and cold village in Aragats (filmed in Dian, Talin), a part of the new state of Soviet Armenia. He is filled with grief and feels unable to move on. With encouragement from his brother-in-law and friend Apro (Frunzik Mkrtchyan), Nahapet reluctantly begins a new relationship with a woman named Noubar (Sofik Sarkisyan). But the pair are estranged from one another from the start, and it is revealed via flashback Noubar's former husband was also killed in an Ottoman massacre. The film shows candid but silent moments of the two attempting to find ways to build a new life and trying to survive with what little they have. They plant trees and labour intensively to build a house despite the harsh weather conditions of the region.

Nahapet and Noubar gradually realise that their survival and future is linked and both now come to the aid of one another. She reveals to Nahapet that she is pregnant. As Nahapet is working outside one day he hears the wailing of a newborn and rushes to his home's wooden door, collapsing on it with the tears and with the full realisation that building a new future after suffering such deprivations in life is possible. The film ends with him and the other villagers walking with their children as they all take a pledge to plant a new apple tree for each child born in the village.

== Symbolism ==
Red apples are always seen in flashback sequences during the film, accompanied to the score of 'Dle Yaman', rolling in the hundreds into a lake.

== Reception ==
British historian David Marshall Lang called the film 'absorbing' and it was broadcast by the BBC in Britain after it was released.
