= The Song of the Old Days =

- Հին օրերի երգը
- Directed by: Albert Mkrtchyan
- Screenplay by: Albert Mkrtchyan
- Starring: Frunzik Mkrtchyan; Shahum Ghazaryan; Verjaluys Mirijanyan; Azat Gasparyan
- Music by: Tigran Mansuryan
- Production company: Hayfilm
- Release date: 23 April 1982
- Running time: 89 minutes
- Country: Soviet Union
- Languages: Armenian, Russian

The Song of the Old Days (Armenian: Հին օրերի երգը, Russian: Песнь прошедших дней) is an Armenian 1982 drama film directed and written by Albert Mkrtchyan.

== Plot ==
The film takes place during World War II in the city of Leninakan (now Gyumri). The heroes of the film are members of an amateur theater troupe who shared the sorrows and losses of wartime with the whole country.

== Cast ==
- Shahum Ghazaryan - Mushegh
- Frunzik Mkrtchyan - Nikol
- Verjaluys Mirijanyan - Mother Hayastan
- Guzh Manukyan - Ruben
- Azat Gasparyan - Mesrop
- Narine Baghdasaryan - Susan
- Ashot Adamyan - Oberon
- Galya Novents - Oberon's mother
