= A Piece of Sky (1980 film) =

- Russian-language poster
- Armenian: Կտոր մը երկինք
- Directed by: Henrik Malyan
- Screenplay by: Stepan Alajajyan, Henrik Malyan
- Starring: Frunzik Mkrtchyan; Sofiko Chiaureli; Ashot Adamyan; Galina Belyayeva
- Music by: Tigran Mansuryan
- Production company: Hayfilm
- Release date: 3 October 1980
- Running time: 92 minutes
- Country: Soviet Union
- Language: Armenian

A Piece of Sky (a.k.a. A Slap in the Face; Armenian: Կտոր մը երկինք; Russian: Пощёчина) is a 1980 Soviet romantic comedy-drama film directed by Henrik Malyan, based on Vahan Totovents's story "Light Blue Flowers". It is a societal critique told through the love story between Torik, a shy outcast saddle maker, and Anjel, a prostitute.

== Plot ==
Orphaned young Torik is adopted by his aunt, Turnanta, and uncle, Grigor-agha. His uncle tries to interest in his profession, making saddles for donkeys, but the boy dreams only of freedom from Armenia's repressive society of the 1930s. The boy takes over the business upon his uncle's death. As he grows up, his aunt tries to find him a wife. However, due to his job and status, no woman in the village wants to marry him.

A trio of prostitutes arrive in town, as men begin pacing haughtily outside the brothel door, sneaking in while no one is looking. Torik enters, where he meets a beautiful prostitute named Anjel. He falls in love with her, and declares to his aunt that he wants this prostitute as his wife. The young man is forced to stand up against town bigotry and insist on his own way of life, as he is willing to do anything to forge his own happiness. Together, these two marginalised characters are redeemed and brought back into society through traditional rites.

== Cast ==
- Frunzik Mkrtchyan – Grigor-agha
- Sofiko Chiaureli – Turvanda
- Ashot Adamyan – Torik
- Galina Belyayeva – Anjel
- Tigran Voskanyan – Teenage Torik
- Arsen Kuyumjyan – Young Torik
- Arshavir Geodakyan – Asatur, butcher
- Armen Khostikyan – Factory worker
- Marie Rose Abousefian – Factory worker's wife
- Galya Novents – Hovakim's wife
- Harutyun Movsisyan – Arsen, butcher's apprentice
- Azat Sherents – Priest
- Leonard Sarkisov – Hairdresser
- Alexander Galibin – Sasha
- Aleksandr Hovhannisyan – Teacher
- Natalya Krachkovskaya – Prostitute
- Evelina Shahiryan – Prostitute
- Meline Hamamjyan – Mariam, neighbour
- Rafael Kotanjyan – Womanizer
- Mayis Gharagyozyan – Karaseryan

== Reception ==
In 1980 Janet Maslin of The New York Times wrote that the film is "acted and directed as straightforwardly as can be, and in this regard it is oddly refreshing. There's no more to this movie than meets the eye."

The Armenian Reporter wrote, "The tempo and spirit of the film are joyous and the surprise ending literally takes you out of your seat".

== Awards ==
Sofiko Chiaureli was awarded the People's Artist of the Armenian SSR for her role in the film.

The film was featured at the San Remo Film Festival, Toronto Film Festival (1983), and BYU International Cinema Festival of comedy (fall 1985)

In 1981, at the 14th Vilnius All-Union Film Festival, Henrik Malyan received the award for Best Director. Tigran Mansuryan was awarded the Best Music Award and Ashot Adamyan was considered the most charming actor of the film festival.
