= Albert Mkrtchyan =

Armenian film director, screenwriter, and actor (1937–2018)

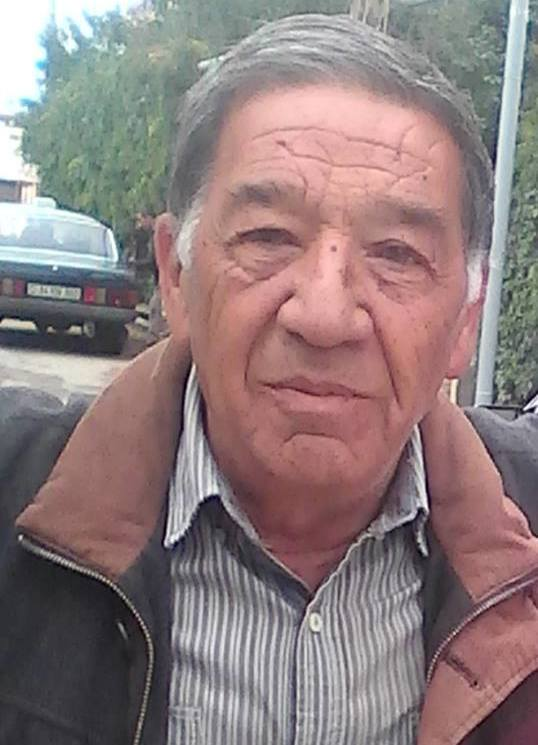
- Mkrtchyan in September 2016
- Born: February 27, 1937; Leninakan, Armenian SSR, Soviet Union
- Died: February 28, 2018 (aged 81); Yerevan, Armenia
- Occupations: director, screenwriter, actor

Albert Mkrtchyan (Armenian: Ալբերտ Մկրտչյան; February 27, 1937 – February 28, 2018) was an Armenian film director, screenwriter, actor, and recipient of the People's Artist of Armenia award (2003).

He was the younger brother of Soviet actor Frunzik Mkrtchyan.

== Biography ==
Albert Mkrtchyan was born in 1937 in Leninakan. In 1960, Albert Mkrtchyan graduated from the Yerevan Fine Arts and Theatre Institute and in 1971, from the Gerasimov Institute of Cinematography in Moscow. From 1960 to 1966, he served as the director of the Armenian TV studio and since 1971, he had been the director of Hayfilm studio. From 1995 to 1999 he was the director of the Gyumri Drama Theater, and since 2000, Mkrtchyan had been the director and artistic director of the Mher Mkrtchyan Artistic Theater.

Mkrtchyan had been a lecturer at the Armenian State Pedagogical University after Khachatur Abovyan and Yerevan State Institute of Theater and Cinema.

== Films ==
Year	Title	Award
2008	The Dawn of the Sad Street	
2000	The Merry Bus	RA State Prize
1988	Breath	
1984	The Tango of Our Childhood	
1982	The Song of the Old Days	Armenian Soviet Socialist Republic State Prize
1980	Big win	
1979	The best half of life	
1977	Stone valley	
1974	Hard rock	
1972	Monument	Armenian Soviet Socialist Republic State Prize
1969	Photo	

As an actor

Year	Title	Role
1972	Men	James, Anush's brother
1961	Daily life and holidays	
1960	North Rainbow	episode

== Awards ==
- State Prize of the Armenian SSR (1981)
- Movses Khorenatsi medal, 2000
- People's Artist of the Republic of Armenia, 2003
- Special Award at the "Hayak" Armenian Movie Awards
