= Guzh Manukyan =

Armenian actor (1937–2025)

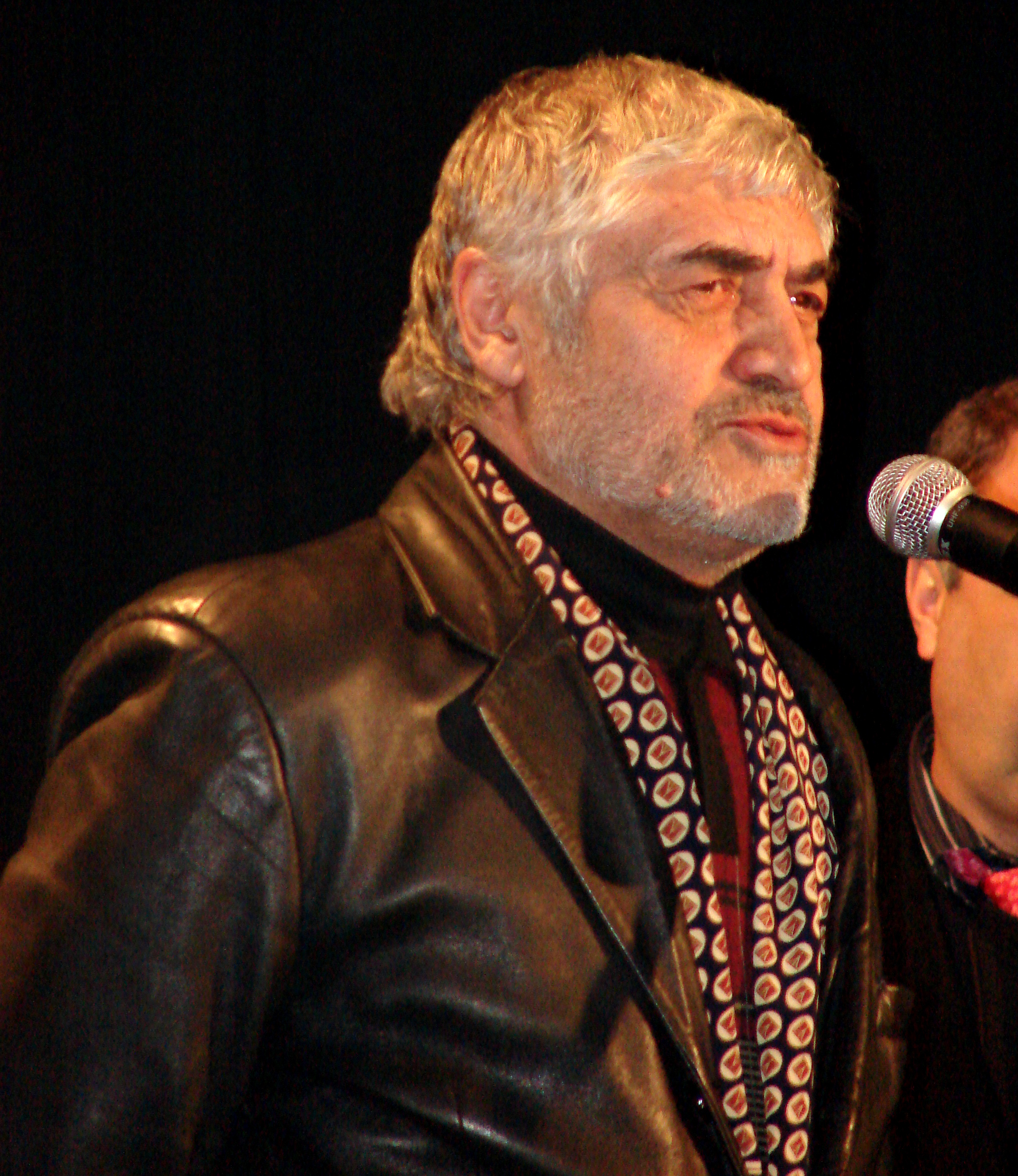
Guzh Manukyan

Guzh Aleksandri Manukyan (Armenian: Գուժ Ալեքսանդրի Մանուկյան; 6 May 1937 – 24 June 2025) was an Armenian actor.

== Life and career ==
Manukyan was born on 6 May 1937 in Leninakan (now Gyumri), Armenian SSR. His father Alexander Araksmanyan was a writer and dramatist. He graduated from the acting faculty of the Institute of Arts in Yerevan in 1958.

Throughout his career he portrayed characters in a number of films, including Nahapet (1977), and The Song of the Old Days (1982).

Manukyan died on 24 June 2025, at the age of 88.

== Awards ==
- People's Artist of the Armenian SSR (1980)
- Movses Khorenatsi Medal (1998).
