= Stepan Kevorkov =

- Ստեփան Կևորկով
- Born: Stepan Aghabeki Kevorkyants; 1 April 1903 [O.S. 19 March] Moscow, Russian Empire
- Died: 15 August 1991 (aged 88); Yerevan, Armenian SSR, Soviet Union
- Occupations: Actor; Film director

Stepan Aghabeki Kevorkov (Note: Armenian: Ստեփան Աղաբեկի Կևորկով, romanized: Stepan Aghabeki Kevorkov; Russian: Степан Агабекович Кеворков, romanized: Stepan Agabekovich Kevorkov) (1 April 1903 [O.S. 19 March] – 15 August, 1991, born Kevorkyants) (Note: Armenian: Կևորկյանց, romanized: Kevorkyantsʻ; Russian: Геворкянц, romanized: Gevorkyants) was an Armenian and Soviet actor and film director. People's Artist of the USSR (1970).

== Biography ==
Kevorkov studied at the State Film College in Moscow, graduating in 1930. At Azerkino studio (present-day Azerbaijanfilm) in Baku, he assisted Nikoloz Shengelaia on the stylish Twenty-six Commissars and later, at Mosfilm Studio, he was an assistant to Aleksandr Dovzhenko on Aerograd (1935). At Armenfilm Studio, Kevorkov worked as an assistant director for Hamo Beknazarian on The Girl from Ararat Valley (1949), in which he also played the supporting role of Tatos. Kevorkov's first picture was The Mountain March 1939 co-directed with Erazam Karamyan.

Kevorkov and Karamyan continued the saga with An Extraordinary Assignment (1965). Kevorkov co-directed the third installment, The Last Deed of Kamo (1974), with Grigori Melik-Avakyan.

Kevorkov, Who joined the Communist Party in 1945, was named People's Artist of the USSR in 1970. He served as executive director of Armenfilm Studio in 1949–1951 and first secretary of the Armenian Filmmakers' Union 1956 to 1964.
