= Gikor (1982 film) =

- Directed by: Sergey Israelyan
- Written by: Hovhannes Tumanyan; Henrik Malyan
- Starring: Albert Gulinyan; Galya Novents; Armen Dzhigarkhanyan; Zhenya Avetisyan; Emma Stepanyan
- Cinematography: Martyn Shakhbazyan
- Edited by: H. Melkonyan
- Music by: Tigran Mansuryan
- Production company: Armenfilm
- Release date: 1982
- Running time: 84 minutes
- Country: Soviet Union
- Language: Armenian

Gikor (Armenian: Գիքոր, Russian: Гикор) is a 1982 Armenian drama film based on Hovhannes Tumanyan's short story of the same name. In USSR, the film was released on 15 May 1982. The film was directed by Sergey Israelyan.

== Plot ==
A village boy, Gikor by name, meets his tragic fate when he is sent to the city (Tiflis by his father, Hambo (Sos Sargsyan) to work for a rich trader, Bazaz Artem (Armen Dzhigarkhanyan).

== Cast ==
Albert Gulinyan as Gikor
Sos Sargsyan as Hambo
Galya Novents as Nani
Armen Dzhigarkhanyan as Bazaz Artem
Zhenya Avetisyan as Nato
Emma Stepanyan
L. Yeghiazaryan
Haykanush Yeremyan
M. Tovmasyan
S. Khambekyan
Svetlana Kirakosyan
Meline Hamamjyan
Ye. Manvelyan
Tigran Voskanyan
A. Jraghatspanyan
Leonard Sarkisov
Harutyun Movsisyan
S. Ajabkhanyan
R. Abalyan
R. Gyulumyan
L. Azizyan
Stepan Harutyunyan
Armen Mazmanyan
K. Barseghyan
K. Simonyan
G. Gyulumyan
A. Kocharyan
K. Grigoryan
Margarita Karapetyan
K. Hovsepyan
H. Ghazaryan
K. Ghulinyan
Ara Stepanyan
