= We and Our Mountains =

- Directed by: Henrik Malyan
- Written by: Hrant Matevosyan
- Starring: Frunzik Mkrtchyan; Azat Sherents; Sos Sargsyan; Khoren Abrahamyan; Artavazd Peleshyan
- Cinematography: Karen Mesyan
- Music by: Tigran Mansurian
- Production company: Armenfilm
- Release date: 1969
- Running time: 94 min
- Country: Soviet Union
- Languages: Armenian, Russian

We and Our Mountains (Armenian: Մենք ենք, մեր սարերը, romanized: Menk’ enk’, mer sarerë; Russian: Мы и наши горы, romanized: My i nashi gory) is a 1969 Armenian comedy-drama film directed by Henrik Malyan and starring Azat Sherents, Frunzik Mkrtchyan, Sos Sargsyan, Khoren Abrahamyan, and Artavazd Peleshyan. The screenplay was adapted by Hrant Matevosyan based on the novella of the same title that he authored in 1962, during the Khrushchev Thaw.

== Plot ==
The film revolves around a comical story of four unlucky shepherds living high in the mountains of Armenia. One day, one of the shepherds, Ishkhan, finds four apparently ownerless sheep, two of which the shepherds slaughter and eat. While they are eating, Revaz, their neighbor, comes and joins them. Revaz asks about his lost sheep, and it is revealed that the slaughtered sheep belonged to him. A fight nearly breaks out between Revaz and two hot-headed shepherds, Pavle and Zaven, but Ishkhan defuses the situation, and Revaz is sent away with money and is promised goods in the fall to compensate for the sheep.

A serious young policeman learns about the incident and comes to investigate, but Revaz evades his questions and pretends that he sold the sheep. The policeman meets the other shepherds, who, after some time, casually admit to slaughtering the sheep. The policemen leaves, but, after hearing another policemen tell an anecdote about how small crimes can lead to larger ones, he returns to the village and begins an official investigation about the stolen sheep. The policeman questions each of the four shepherds who slaughtered the sheep—Ishkhan, Avak, Pavle and Zaven—to receive a clear description of the crime, but the men argue with him, evade his questions, and frustrate him. They complain that the policeman has come from outside and is interfering in an affair between neighbors. The policeman becomes less and less determined to continue the investigation. The policeman, Revaz and the four shepherds have a mock trial where they state their grievances about the Soviet state. Then, the policeman and the five villagers travel to the city with a flock of sheep. The policeman jokes that thieves do not usually come to town to deliver sheep, and says that they probably will not even be tried. Some villagers from a neighboring village see them and shout from far away, asking them where they are going. The men shout that they are going to the city because they have stolen sheep. The film ends with a shot of the men arriving in the city with the sheep.

== Cast ==
- Frunzik Mkrtchyan – Ishkhan
- Azat Sherents – Avak
- Sos Sargsyan – Lieutenant
- Khoren Abrahamyan – Pavle
- Armen Ayvazyan – Zaven
- Artavazd Peleshyan – Revaz
- Galya Novents (uncredited)
