= Shamakhyan =

Former village in Tavush, Armenia

- Location within Armenia Location within Tavush
- Coordinates: 40°45′45″N 44°50′11″E
- Country: Armenia
- Marz (Province): Tavush
- Time zone: UTC+4 ( )
  - Summer (DST): UTC+5 ( )

Shamakhyan is a former village in Armenia, currently absorbed by the town of Dilijan in the Tavush Province. It was not listed in the 2011 official Armenian Census, and is likely included in the census count of the town of Dilijan.

== Notable people ==
- Anahit Ananyan (1909–1987), agronomist
