= Darakert =

Darakert Դարակերտ
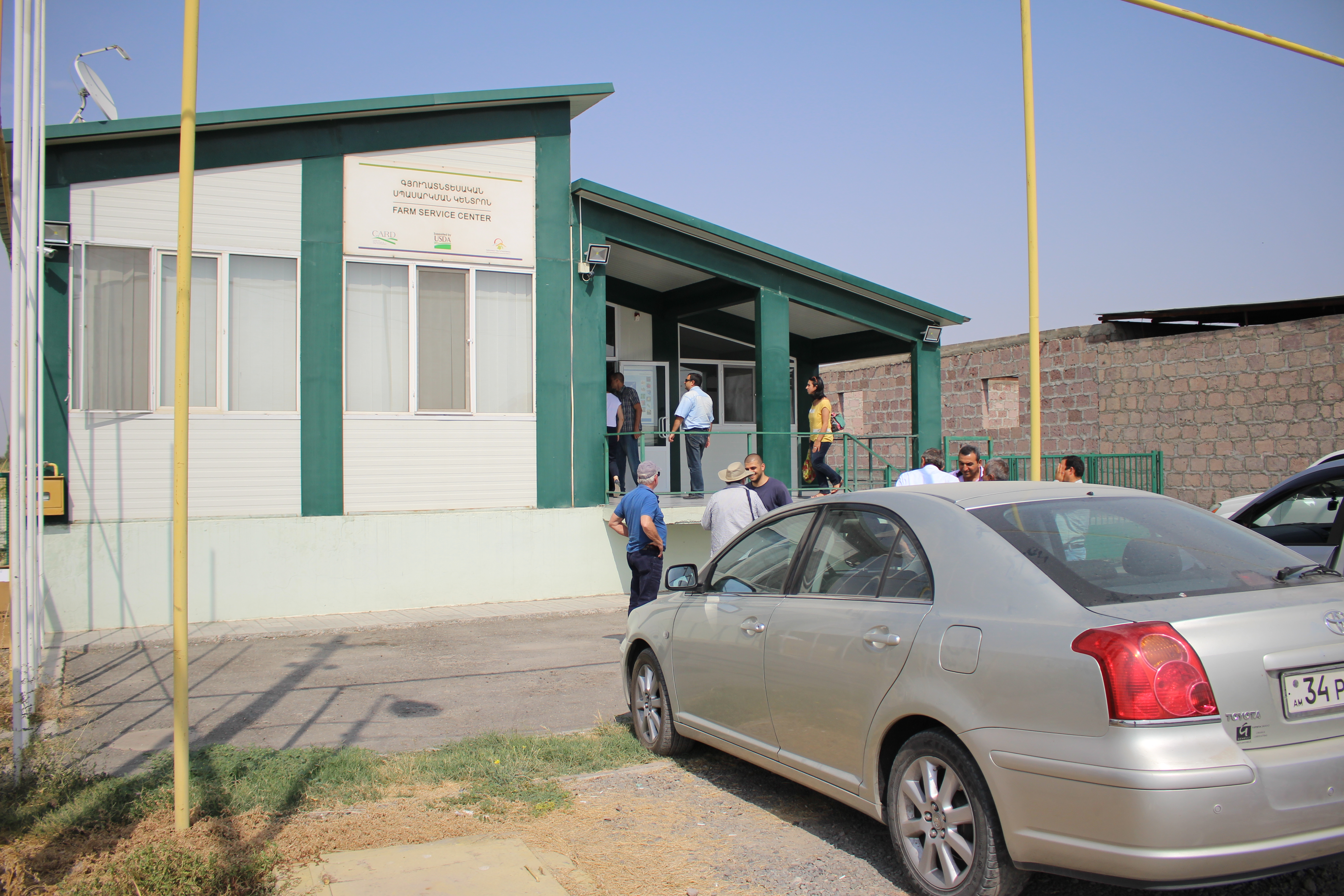

- Location within Armenia Location within Ararat
- Coordinates: 40°06′21″N 44°24′50″E
- Country: Armenia
- Province: Ararat
- Municipality: Masis

Population (2011)
  - Total: 2,723
- Time zone: UTC+4
  - Summer (DST): UTC+5

Darakert (Armenian: Դարակերտ) is a village in the Masis Municipality of the Ararat Province of Armenia.The village had 2,723 inhabitants in 2011.

Previous official names - "Haji Eylaz" (- 1920s), "Eylaz" (1920s - 1946), "Ipakly" (1946 - 1950s), "Masis sovkhoz settlement" (1950s - 1978).
