= Verjaluys Mirijanyan =

- Born: December 22, 1916; Iğdır, Surmalin Uyezd, Russian Empire
- Died: February 3, 1992 (aged 75); Yerevan, Armenia
- Years active: 1958 — 1992
- Awards: Honored Artist of the Armenian SSR (1962)

Verjaluys Karapeti Mirijanyan (Armenian: Վերջալույս Միրիջանյան, 22 December 1916 - 3 February 1992) — Armenian actress and Honored Artist of Armenia. She was known for The Song of the Old Days, A Bride from the North, and Panos the Clumsy.
