= Azat Sherents =

Soviet Armenian actor

- Ազատ Շերենց
- Born: 5 April 1913; Tiflis, Caucasus Viceroyalty, Russian Empire
- Died: 25 December 1993 (aged 80); Yerevan, Armenia
- Occupation: Actor

Azat Armenaki Sherents (Armenian: Ազատ Արմենակի Շերենց; 5 April 1913 – 25 December 1993) was one of the first Armenian comedic actors. In 1931, he started his acting career on the stage of Sundukyan Drama Theater in Yerevan. In 1934–1937, he studied at the Armenian Theater Studio in Moscow. In 1937–1968, Sherents performed at the Leninakan Drama Theater. From 1968, he worked at Armenfilm studio, starring in a number of Armenian films until his death in 1993.

== Filmography ==
Year	Title	Role	Notes
1970	How to Become a Man	Buba	
1970	We and Our Mountains	Avag	
1971	Khatabala		
1973	Grandfather		
1973	The Men	Vazgen	
1974	Winepress	Head of the railway station	
1974	Chaos	Papasha	
1975	Here, on This Crossroads	Mukuch	
1976	My Heart Is in the Highlands (TV)	John Byron	
1977	Autumn Sun	Andranik	
1978	Arevik (TV)		
1979	Starry summer	Chef cook	
1979	August (TV)	Station director	
1980	The Legend of the Clown		
1980	A Piece of Sky	Pries	
1981	Automobile on the Roof		
1982	Seans odnovremennoy igry (TV)		
1984	A Drop of Honey		
1985	Apple Garden	Sahak	
1990	Facing the Wall		
