= Yuri Yerznkyan =

Soviet Armenian film director and actor

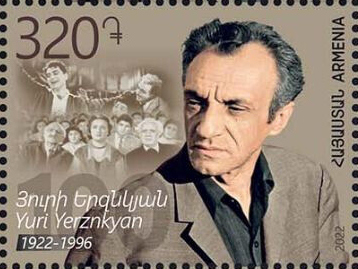
- Yerznkyan on a 2022 stamp of Armenia
- Born: 26 January 1922; Tiflis, Georgia
- Died: 19 December 1996 (aged 74); Moscow, USSR
- Occupation: film director

Yuri Aramaisovich Yerznkyan (Armenian: Յուրի Արամայիսի Երզնկյան; Russian: Юрий Арамаисович Ерзинкян; 26 January 1922 – 19 December 1996) was a Soviet Armenian film director and actor.

Yerznkyan was born in Georgia, and in 1940–41 studied at the Vakhtangov Theatre in Moscow. In 1943, he moved to Yerevan in Armenia, where he worked at Hayfilm, first as an actor and then as a film director. In 1946, he returned to Moscow and by 1949 completed directing courses of the Moscow Film Institute. He started his own directorial work in 1953, in Yerevan, and in 1982 was appointed as the head of directing faculty of the Armenian State Pedagogical University. Earlier in 1975 Yerznkyan was awarded the title of People's Artist of the Armenian SSR. He died in Moscow, and was buried in Yerevan.

Yerznkyan had a daughter, Anna, and a son, Ruben; both children headed cinematography-related departments at the Armenian State Pedagogical University.

== Filmography ==
- 1955: Looking for the Addressee
- 1956: Captives of Hovazadzor
- 1958: The Song of First Love
- 1958: About My Friend
- 1964: Difficult Passage
- 1969: Bridges Over Oblivion
- 1971: Khatabala
