= Armen Mazmanyan =

Armenian actor (1960–2014)

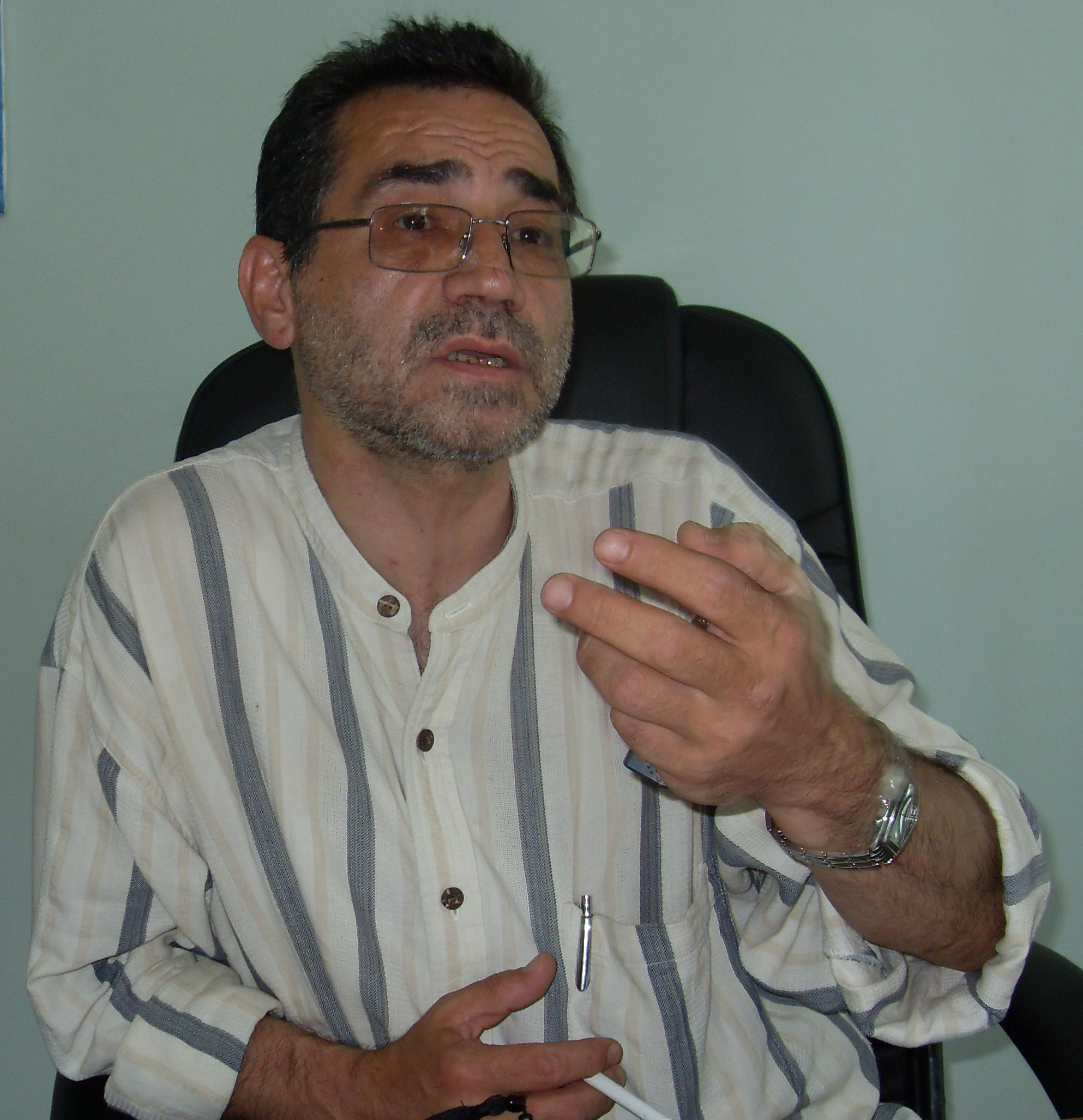
- Born: Armen Mazmanyan; 15 February 1960; Yerevan, Armenia
- Died: 8 January 2014 (aged 53)
- Occupations: Director, actor
- Years active: 1981–2014
- Awards: Honoured art worker of Armenia

Armen Mazmanyan (Armenian: Արմեն Մազմանյան, 15 February 1960 – 8 January 2014) was a theater director and actor from Armenia. He was rector of the Yerevan State Institute of Theater and Cinema (YSITC).
