= Nerses Hovhannisyan =

- Born: 12 October 1938; Yerevan, Armenian SSR, Soviet Union
- Died: 23 October 2016 (aged 78); Moscow, Russia
- Occupations: Film director, Actor, and Screenwriter

Nerses Hovhannisyan (Armenian: Ներսես Գեդեոնի Հովհաննիսյան; 12 October 1938 – 23 October 2016), was an Armenian film director, actor and screenwriter.

== Education and Career ==
He graduated from the Directing Department of Yerevan Fine Arts and Theatre Institute in 1959. From that time on he worked at Armenfilm Studios. Between 1966 and 1967 he assisted Russian director Yuli Raizman during the shooting of Tvoy sovremennik (1967). In addition to his career directing, Hovhannisyan occasionally acted roles in Armenian films.

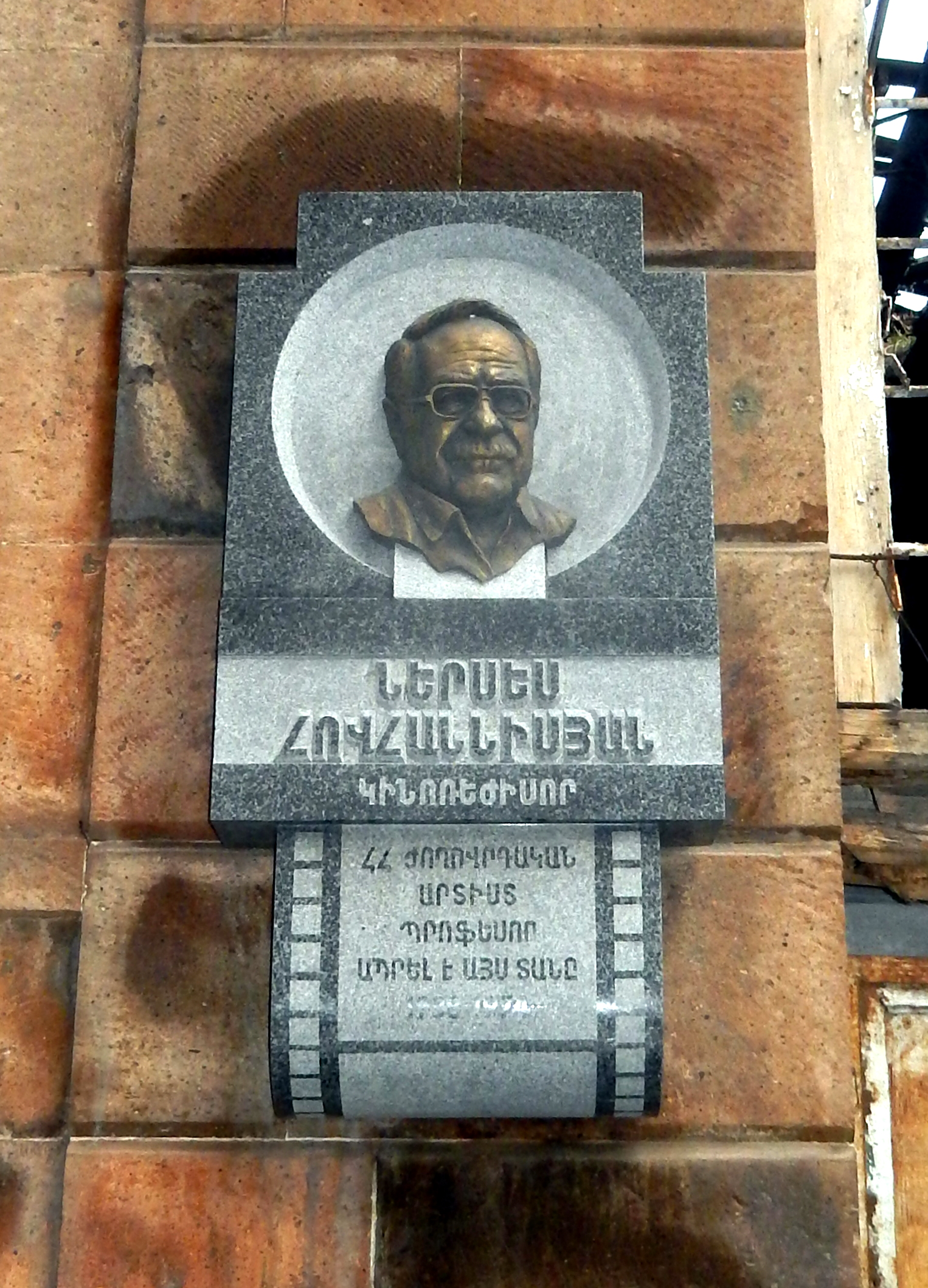
Nerses Hovhannisyan's plaque on Pavstos Buzand Street of Yerevan

== Filmography ==
- 1968 – A Meeting at an Exhibition, short
- 1969 – Attention, It Is Raisman Shooting, script, dir., doc.
- 1969 – Watch Out, an Animal, doc.
- 1969 – Panos the Clumsy
- 1971 – Avetik Isahakyan, doc.
- 1972 – A Meeting with Professor Badalyan, doc.
- 1973 – An Hour Before the Dawn, co-dir. (dir. E.Karamyan)
- 1975 – A Bride from the North
- 1977 – Cooks Arrived for Competition, co-script, dir.
- 1979 – Live Long (as Benik)
- 1980 – The Big Win (starring)
- 1980 – The Flight Starts from the Earth, co-script, dir.
- 1981 – Business Trip to Sanatorium (as Artyusha)
- 1982 – The Mechanics of Happiness
- 1985 – Hosted by the Commander, co-script, co-dir. (along with H.Khachatryan)
- 1985 – The Last Sunday (as Movses)
- 1986 – A Lonely Nut-Tree (as Hovsep)
- 1986 – Strange Games, co-script, dir.
- 1990 – Nostalgia (as Yenok)
