= Henrik Malyan =

Armenian film director and writer

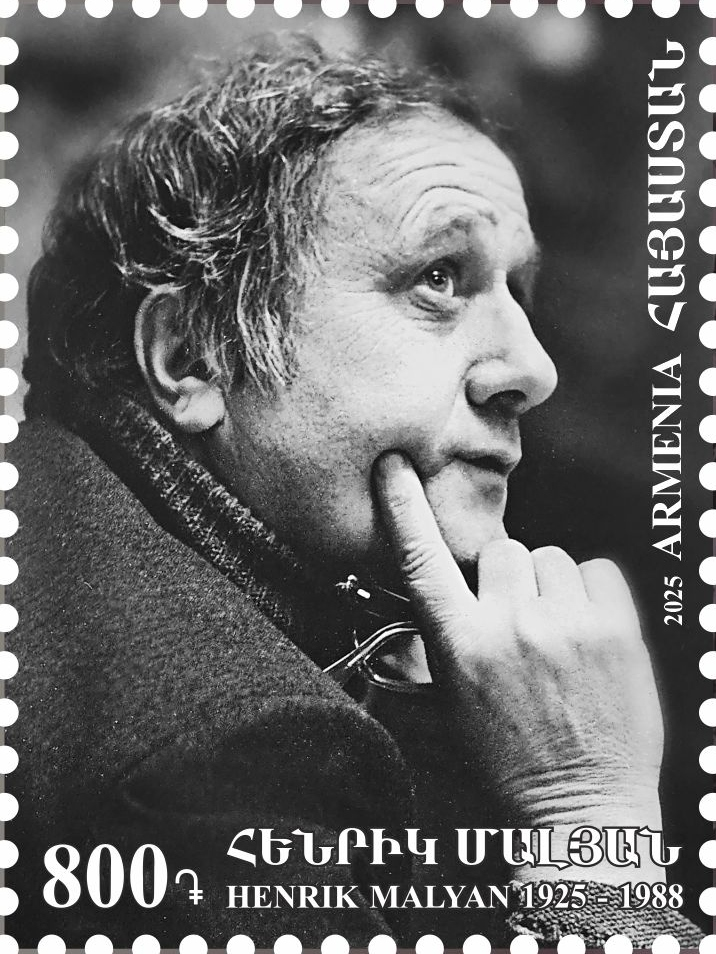
- Malyan on a 2025 stamp of Armenia
- Born: September 30, 1925; Telavi, Georgian SSR
- Died: March 14, 1988 (aged 62); Yerevan, Soviet Armenia
- Occupations: Film director; screenwriter
- Children: 1
- Relatives: David Malyan (uncle)
- Writing career
- Years active: 1951–1988

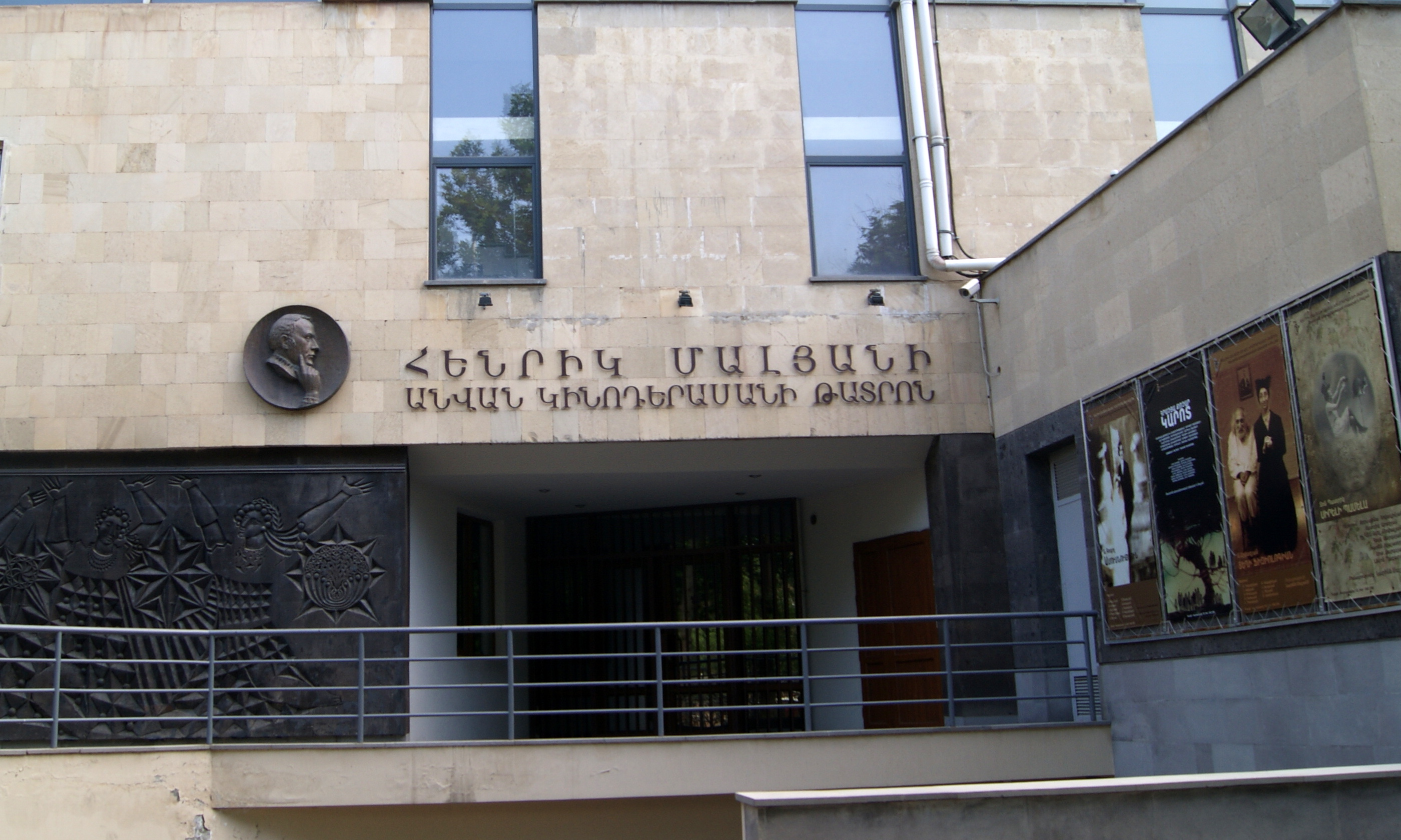
Henrik Malyan Theatre (founded in 1980), 18 Vardanants St, Yerevan

Henrik Sureni Malyan (Armenian: Հենրիկ Մալյան, also transliterated Henrik Malian; September 30, 1925 – March 14, 1988) was an Armenian film director and writer.

Malyan was born in Telavi, Georgia. Malyan's uncle was the actor David Malyan. He studied chess at an early age, along with Tigran Petrosian. From 1942 to 1945 he worked as a draftsman and designer at a factory in Tbilisi. In 1951 he graduated from the Yerevan State Institute of Theatre and Cinematography. Between 1951 and 1954, he was a director at various theatres in Armenia. In 1953, he graduated from the Moscow Theatre Institute. From 1954 onward he worked with the film studio Armenfilm.

His 1977 film Nahapet (Life Triumphs) is considered to be one of the most important Armenian films to deal with the Armenian genocide. It was exhibited at the 1978 Cannes Film Festival.

== Legacy ==
Malyan is widely regarded as one of the central figures of 20th-century Armenian cinema. His films, particularly We Are Our Mountains (1969) and Nahapet (1977), are frequently cited for their humanist themes, poetic visual style, and exploration of Armenian identity. Scholars often highlight his role in shaping the Soviet-era Armenian cinematic voice, and several of his works remain staples in Armenian film retrospectives and university film programs.

In 1980 he founded the Henrik Malyan Theatre-Studio for stage works, In 1982 he was named a People's Artist of the USSR, and his films continue to screen at festivals and cultural events dedicated to Armenian film history.

He is widely regarded as one of the most important figures in Armenian cinema, with several of his films recognized as classics of the Soviet era.

Malyan’s work continues to be featured in Armenian and international retrospectives, including recent anniversary screenings organized by the National Cinema Center of Armenia.

== Films ==
As director unless noted.

- Guys from the Army Band (1961)
- Road to the Stage (1963)
- Mr. Jacques and Others (1966, "The Sham Informer" segment)
- Triangle (1967)
- We and Our Mountains (1970)
- Father (1973)
- Life Triumphs (Nahapet; 1977, also writer)
- A Piece of Sky (1980, also writer)
- Gikor (1982, writer)
- A Drop of Honey (1984, also writer)
- White Dreams (1985, writer)
- Yearning (1990, writer)

== Awards ==
- State Prize of the Armenian SSR (1975)
- People's Artist of the Armenian SSR (1977)
- People's Artist of the USSR (1982)
