= Sos Sargsyan =

Soviet and Armenian actor (1929–2013)

Sos Sargsyan PAU
- Սոս Սարգսյան
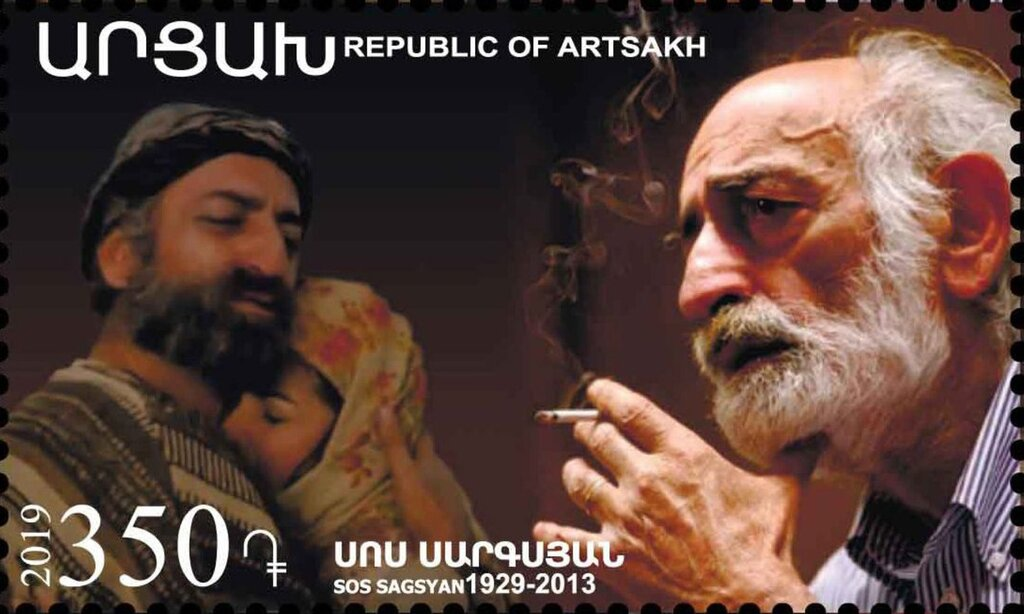
- Sargsyan on a 2019 stamp of Artsakh
- Born: Sos Artashesi Sargsyan; 24 October 1929; Stepanavan, Soviet Armenia
- Died: 26 September 2013 (aged 83); Yerevan, Armenia
- Resting place: Komitas Pantheon
- Occupations: Actor, director
- Years active: 1947–2013
- Awards: People's Artist of the USSR (1985); People's Artist of the Armenian SSR (1972); State Prize of the Armenian SSR (1975, 1979, 1988)

Sos Artashesi Sargsyan (Armenian: Սոս Սարգսյան; 24 October 1929 – 26 September 2013) was a prominent Armenian actor, director and writer.

== Biography ==
Sos Sargsyan was born in Stepanavan in northern Armenia, at the time part of the Soviet Union. He moved to Yerevan in 1948 and started to perform at the Theater of the Young Spectator. He graduated from the Fine Arts and Theater Institute in 1954 as an actor. Between 1954 and 1991 he performed at the Sundukyan State Academic Theatre of Yerevan.

In October 1991, a month after Armenia's independence from the Soviet Union, Sargsyan took part in the first presidential election in independent Armenia. He was nominated by the Armenian Revolutionary Federation. In 1991 he established the Hamazgayin (Pan-National) Theater, which he headed until his death. From 1997 to 2006 he was the rector of the Yerevan Cinema and Theatre Institute. Sargsyan died on 26 September 2013 in Yerevan. Sargsyan's funeral was held on 29 September in attendance of Armenia's President Serzh Sargsyan and thousands of people. He was buried at the Komitas Pantheon.

== Career ==
Sargsyan started acting in 1947. Some of his most notable roles include Don Quixote, Iago, King John, King Lear, etc. He starred in over 40 films, mostly Armenian. Besides Armenian films he has starred in a number of Russian films, most notable of which is Solaris (1972), directed by Andrei Tarkovsky.

== Filmography ==
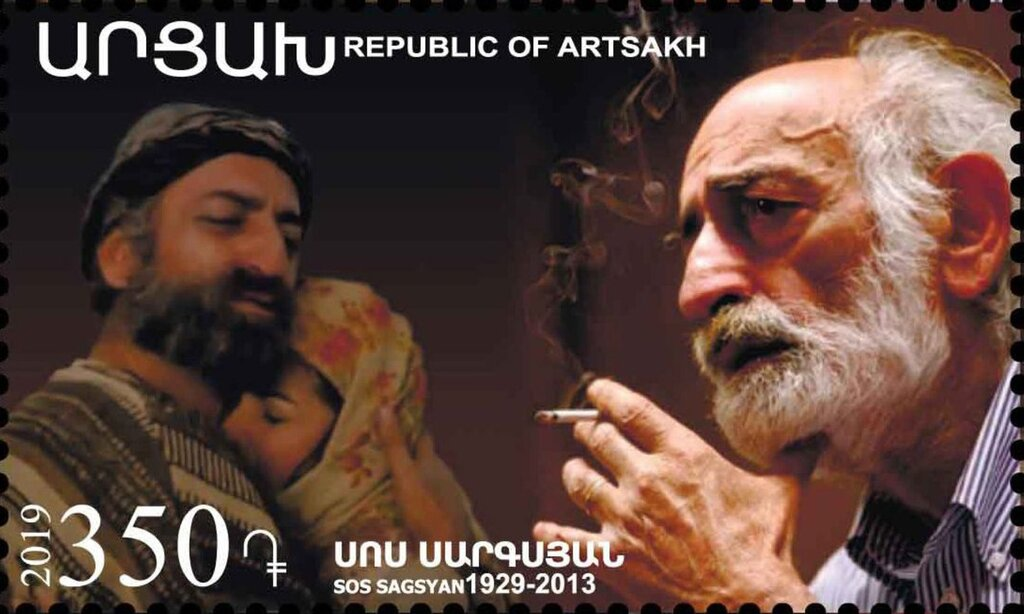
Sargsyan on a 2019 stamp of Artsakh

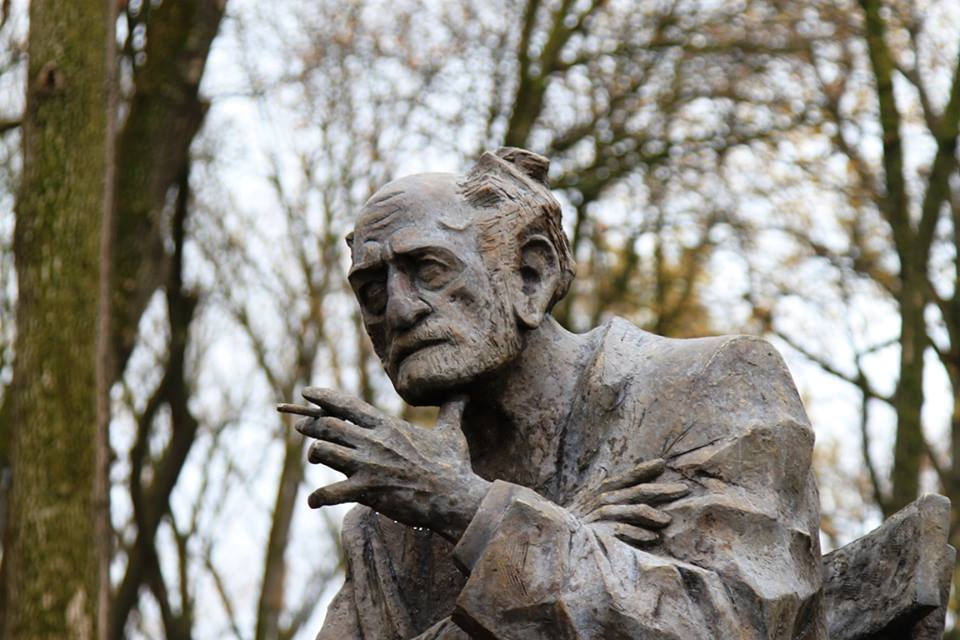
The statue of Sargsyan in Stepanavan

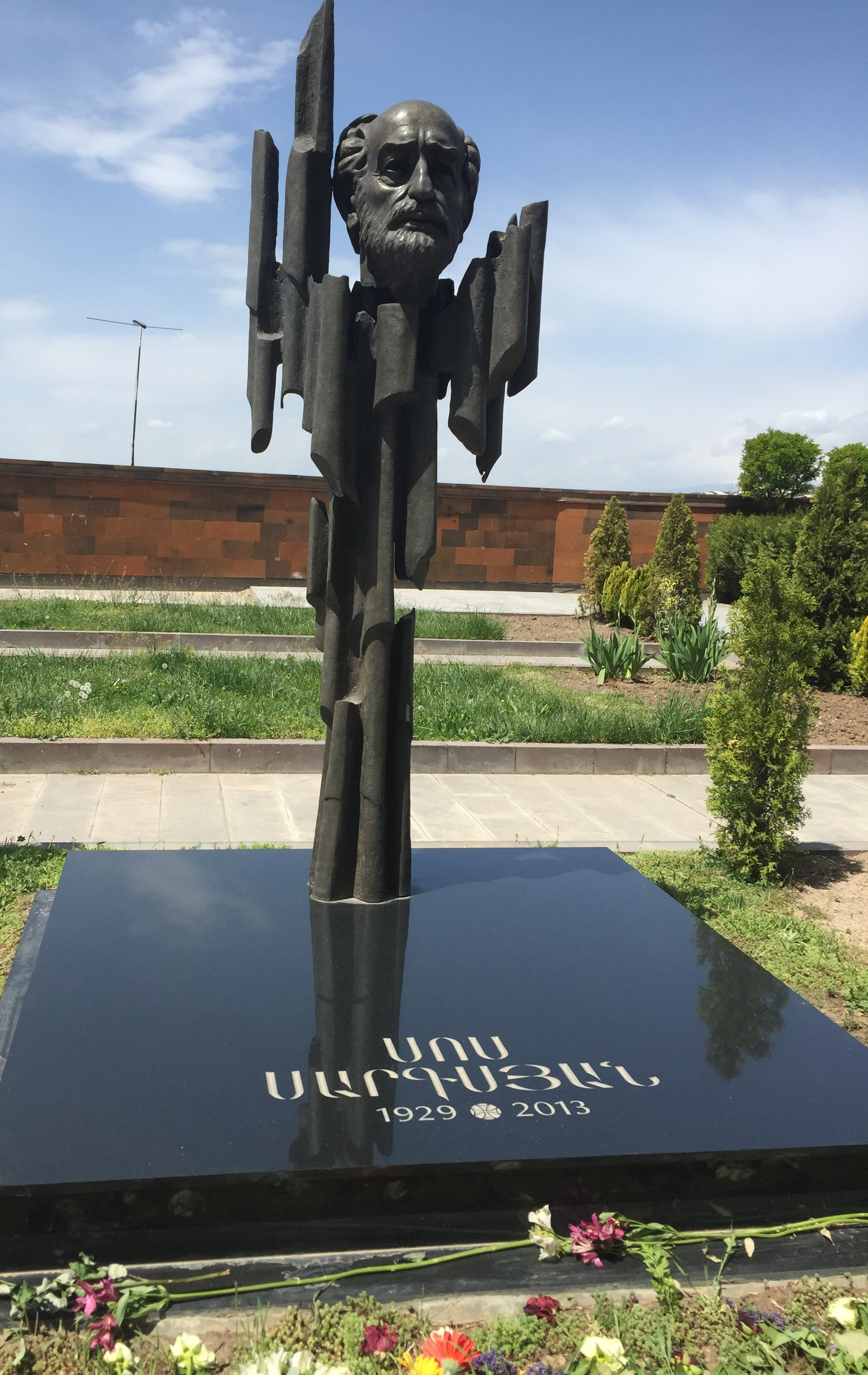
Sargsyan's tomb in Yerevan's Komitas Pantheon

- 1960: Guys from the Army Band as Artashes (uncredited)
- 1962: Tchanaparh as Dayan
- 1966: Msyo Zhake yev urishner as Priest (segment "The Priest's Promise")
- 1967: Triangle as varpet Mkrtich
- 1968: Aprum er mi mard
- 1969: We and Our Mountains as Lieutenant
- 1971: Heghnar spring as varpet Mkrtich
- 1972: Khatabala as Zambakhov
- 1972: Solaris as Dr. Gibarian
- 1974: Hndzan as Vardan
- 1974: Qaos as Smbat Alimyan
- 1975: Zhayre as Hayrapet
- 1976: I togda ty vernyoshsya as Babayan
- 1977: Yerkunq as Murza
- 1977: Sobstvennoe mnenie as Ashot Gasparyan
- 1977: Nahapet as Nahapet
- 1978: Star Of Hope as Movses
- 1978: Komissiya po rassledovaniyu
- 1979: The Best Half of Life
- 1979: Goluboy lev as «Yuvelir»
- 1980: Beyond The Seven Mountains as Hovsep
- 1981: Dzori Miro as Miro
- 1982: Gikor as Hambo
- 1984: Sans Famille (TV Movie) as Vitalis
- 1985: Apple Garden as Martin
- 1985: Tchermak anurjner as Hakob
- 1985: Khndzori aygin as Martin
- 1986: Pod znakom odnorogoy korovy
- 1987: Yeghishe Charents – Known and Unknown Sides
- 1988: Kvartet as Petros
- 1988: Pharmacy On The Corner as Adamyan
- 1988: Vozneseniye
- 1989: I povtoritsya vsyo
- 1992: Where Have You Been, Man of God? (TV Mini-Series) as Stepham Yesayan
- 2001: And There Was Light
- 2001: The Merry Bus as priest
- 2006: Mayak as Grandfather
