= Frunzik Mkrtchyan =

Soviet Armenian actor

Frunzik Mkrtchyan PAA
- Մհեր Մկրտչյան
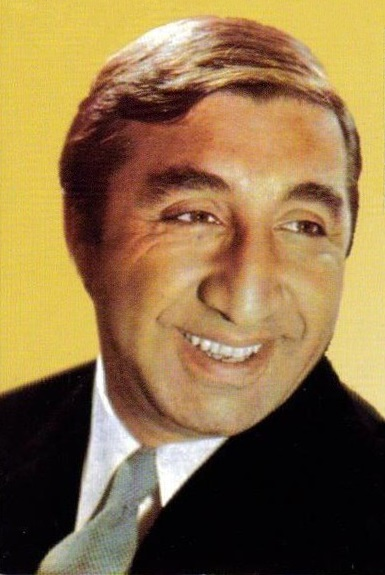
- Born: Mher Mkrtchyan; 4 July 1930; Leninakan, Armenian SSR, Transcaucasian SFSR, Soviet Union
- Died: 29 December 1993 (aged 63); Yerevan, Armenia
- Resting place: Komitas Pantheon
- Occupation: Actor
- Years active: 1945–1993
- Spouse: Donara Pilosyan
- Children: 2
- Relatives: Albert Mkrtchyan (brother)

Signature
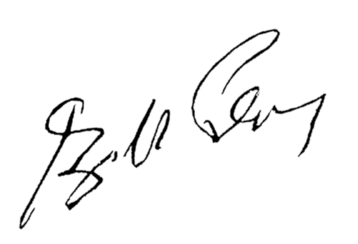

Mher Musheghi Mkrtchyan (Armenian: Մհեր Մուշեղի Մկրտչյան; 4 July 1930 – 29 December 1993), better known by the name Frunzik (Armenian: Ֆրունզիկ; Russian: Фрунзик), a diminutive of his official given name Frunze, in honor of Mikhail Frunze, was an Armenian stage and film actor. Mkrtchyan is widely considered one of the greatest actors of the Soviet period among Armenians and the USSR as a whole. He received the prestigious People's Artist of the USSR award in 1984.

== Life ==
=== Childhood ===
Frunze (Mher) Mkrtchyan was born in Leninakan (present day Gyumri) to father Mushegh Mkrtchyan and mother Sanam Mkrtchyan, both of whom were orphaned survivors of the Armenian genocide. Mushegh Mkrtchyan fled to Gyumri from Mush, while Sanam escaped the genocide from Van. His parents met while they were working in a local Leninakan textile factory that was created in the 1930s, with Mushegh later going on to work as a bricklayer and Sanam as a dish washer.

After marriage, Mushegh and Sanam had their first child, Mher Mkrtchyan, who would be the eldest of their four children; one brother in 1941, Albert Mkrtchyan (who would later become a film director) and two sisters, Clara born in 1934 and Ruzanna born in 1943. Mher's nickname, Frunzik, was given to him in honor of Soviet general Mikhail Frunze. Growing up, Mher took an interest in the arts, and attended the local art and music school. As a child, he would put on informal shows for people living in the neighborhood. Frunzik's father praised his acting talent, but pressured his son to pursue a painting career.

During this period of Mkrtchyan's life, in the aftermath of World War II, poverty and hunger was a commonality. As such, his father stole cotton from the textile factory to sell on the black market for extra income to feed his children. Mushegh was arrested and given 10 years of hard labor cutting trees in Nizhny Tagil, Sverdlovsk Oblast, Russia. Thus, Frunzik and his siblings grew up with their mother, Sanam, who is credited with giving the actor his sense of humor. At the age of 17, he began to study and perform at the Leninakan Askanaz Mravyan Theatre Group, his first formal experience acting in theatre.

=== Early adulthood and start of acting career ===
In 1953, Mkrtchyan left Gyumri to further his education in Yerevan at the Yerevan State Institute of Theater and Arts. Following that experience, Frunzik became part of the Sundukyan Academic Theater troupe in 1956, after being scouted by director of the theatre troupe Vardan Ajemian in 1955. In that same year, Mkrtchyan had his first film debut with a role in the film In Search of an Addressee, it was also during this time period, at the age of 28, Mher Mkrtchyan met and fell in love with his future wife, the 18 year old Donara Pilosyan, also an actress. Following that experience, he was given parts in Armenian and Russian films that were to become iconic, such as Why is the River Noisy in 1959 and Kidnapping, Caucasian Style and Aybolit-66 in 1966. These movies earned him a reputation as a comedic actor, though he was known as a more serious actor from years of acting in theatre.

=== Film career ===
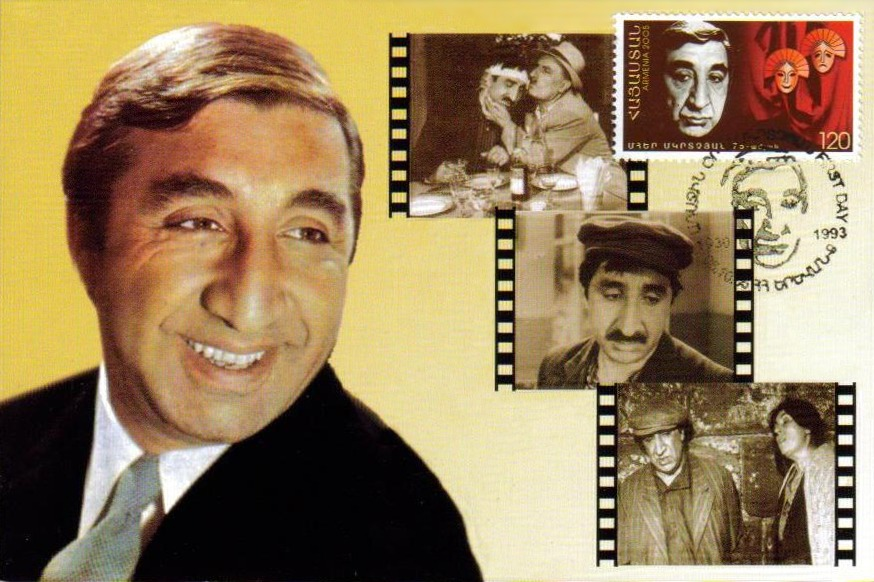
2013 Armenian post card dedicated to Mkrtchyan and his roles

From the late 1960s and on, Frunzik Mkrtchyan starred in films that would later on become classics of Armenian and Soviet cinema, such as Yerankyuni ("Triangle") (1967), Menq enq, mer sarere ("We and Our Mountains") (1969), Mimino ("Hawk") (1977), Hayrik ("Father") (1973), Nahapet ("Patriarch") (1977), Ktor muh Yerkinq ("A Piece of Sky") (1980), Hin oreri yerge ("The Song of the Old Days") (1982), Mer mankutyan tangon ("The Tango of Our Childhood") (1985). There are noticeable parallels between Frunzik's life and the roles he played in films, most notably with The Tango of Our Childhood. The film, written and directed by his brother Albert, takes place in Leninakan, his city of birth. Beyond that, the plot of the movie involves a father-son conflict over the soon choosing to be an actor, which closely resembles Mkrtchyan's own personal conflict with his family. At the end of the film, the father is arrested and sent to labor camp, similar to the fate of Mkrktchyan's own father.

=== Personal life ===
Frunzik was initially romantically involved with a classmate of his, Knar, but was rejected by her family and thus the pair never married. Mkrtchyan's first wife was Donara Pilosyan, and together they had a daughter, Nune, and a son, Vahagn. The couple played in a number of films together, notably Kidnapping, Caucasian Style and Khatabala. The marriage was initially a happy one, but Donara was diagnosed with schizophrenia and eventually sent to a mental institution for treatment. Mkrtchyan became a single parent of two young children. Frunzik became immensely depressed by the illness of his wife and his son Vahagn's subsequent inheritance of his mother's mental illness. Both Donara and Vahagn eventually went to France for treatment. Mher Mkrtchyan married again in 1978 with Tamar Hovannisyan. At this point in his life, he was suffering from alcohol abuse, which many attribute to the difficulties of his personal life.

== Death ==
It is said by family members that during his last days, Frunzik Mkrtchyan was depressed by the illness of his son and death of a close friend and actor Azat Sherents. His daughter Nune stated that her father predicted he would die soon, and came to have a conversation with her about how he saw the reaction to his death being perceived. On 29 December 1993 Frunzik Mkrtchyan died in Yerevan, Armenia. When he died in 1993, thousands of people attended the funeral and burial of their beloved actor at the Komitas Pantheon, located in the center of Yerevan.

== Awards ==
Mher Mkrtchyan received multiple awards during his lifetime for his major contributions to film. He was awarded the People's Artist of the Armenian SSR in 1971 and Armenian SSR State Prize in 1975. Following that, Mkrtchyan was awarded the title the People's Artist of the USSR in 1984.

== Legacy ==
The house-museum of Mher Mkrtchyan functions currently in Gyumri. It was opened in 2006 on the initiative of the Gyumri Municipality. The museum displays the artist's costumes, props used in films, personal items and photographs from films in which he took part.

Frunzik Mkrtchyan: India, a 2021 documentary explored Mkrtchyan's connections with the Bollywood cinema of India, where he had worked in films such as Adventures of Ali-Baba and the Forty Thieves (1980) with Indian actors Dharmendra and Hema Malini who also feature in the documentary.

== Selected filmography ==
- Hastseatiroj voronumnere (1955) – (uncredited)
- Patvi hamar (1956) – Vardan
- 01-99 (1959, Short) – Garsevan
- Inchu e aghmkum gete (1959) – Khachik (uncredited)
- Fellows From a Music Group (1960) – Arsen
- The Master and the Servant (1963, Short) – Simon
- Thirty Three (1965) – professor Bruk
- Iyirmialtilar (1966) – usatyy Gochi
- The Formula of Rainbow (1966) – Kaburyan
- From the Times of Hunger (1966)
- Kidnapping, Caucasian Style (1967) – Dzhabrail
- Aybolit-66 (1967) – Pirate #2
- Triangle (1967) – Gaspar
- Don't Grieve (1968) – Stranger in prison
- Belyy royal (1968)
- An Explosion After Midnight (1969) – Mukhtashev
- We and Our Mountains (1969) – Ishkhan
- Adam and Eve (1970)
- Photography (1970)
- Khatabala (1971) – Isai
- Men (1972)
- Monument (1972)
- Hayrik (1973) – Hovsep (Hayrik)
- Adventures of Mher on Vacation (1973) – Suren
- Baghdasar Divorces His Wife (1977) – Baghdasar
- Mimino (1977) – Ruben 'Rubik' Khachikyan
- Nahapet (1977) – Apro
- Stone Valley (1977) – Sandro
- Soldier and Elephant (1978) – Armenak
- Fuss of the Fusses (1979) – Boris Ivanovich
- Oh, Gevorg (1979)
- Adventures of Ali-Baba and the Forty Thieves (1980) – Mustafa
- A Piece of Sky (1980) – Grigor-agha
- Tbilisi, Parizi, Tbilisi (1980)
- The Big Win (1980) – Garnik
- A Humble Man (1981)
- Pered zakrytoy dveryu (1982) – Vartan
- Song of the Old Days (1982) – Nikol
- Offered for Singles (1984) – Vartan – zhenikh Niny
- The Fire (1984) – Ruben
- Sohni Mahiwal (1984) – Warrior
- The Tango of Our Childhood (1985) – Ruben
- On the Bottom (1987)
- Tchanaparh depi Sasuntsi Davit (1988) – Vardan
- Dykhanie (1989) – (final film role)
