= Armenian genocide in culture =

1915 Ottoman history in creative works

Armenian genocide in culture includes the ways in which people have represented the Armenian genocide of 1915 in art, literature, music, and films. Furthermore, there are dozens of Armenian genocide memorials around the world. According to historian Margaret Lavinia Anderson, the Armenian genocide had reached an "iconic status" as "the apex of horrors conceivable" prior to World War II.

== Art ==
Arshile Gorky's The Artist and His Mother (ca. 1926–36)

The earliest example of the Armenian genocide in art was a medal issued in St. Petersburg, signifying Russian sympathy for Armenian suffering. It was struck in 1915, as the massacres and deportations were still raging. Since then, dozens of medals in different countries have been commissioned to commemorate the event.

The paintings of Armenian-American Arshile Gorky, a seminal figure of Abstract Expressionism, are considered to have been informed by the suffering and loss of the period. In 1915, at age 10, Gorky fled his native Van and escaped to Russian-Armenia with his mother and three sisters, only to have his mother die of starvation in Yerevan in 1919. His two The Artist and His Mother paintings are based on a photograph with his mother taken in Van.

A case study of Gorky's 1946-7 painting The Plough and the Song, reveals central themes of suffering and loss, starvation and hunger, and cultural nostalgia emerge through his biomorphic and organically curvilinear forms representing fertility and nature. Through warm, earthy colors, he paints from memory the fertile agricultural lands of his Armenian homeland. He reconstructs a new hybridized identity in America, an amalgam of visual cultural practice of modern art of the West and wistfulness for the rich culture of the Armenian people, reflected in his paintings. The Plough and the Song materialize the dialectic of violence and culture in the fractured history of the Armenian people.

Scholars on Gorky agree that the suffering and loss he experienced during the Armenian genocide strongly informed the production of his modernist paintings in America. Comparisons of Gorky's The Plough and the Song (1946-7) with works of his contemporaries in the field of organic biomorphic abstraction reveal the stark manifestation of his experiences of brutality and horror. Gorky appears to have systematically developed the imagery of the canvas such that many of his biomorphic forms appear to be “bleeding,” alluding to the horrors and violence he witnessed during the Armenian genocide. He depicts red far more fluidly, yet systematically. Several of his forms appear to be “bleeding,” given the semblance of a trail of blood that streams down from the inflicted “wounds” on the biomorphic forms. Gorky makes liberal use of shading to deliberately draw attention to the fact that these ebbing blots and streams of red are, in fact, bleeding wounds. Yet, the ironic truth in the way Gorky seems to weld his nostalgia for Armenian culture and rich heritage with the violent history of genocide in a single compositional frame ultimately reflects many Armenians’ own views of their fractured history. There exists a constant dialectic of culture and barbarism in the history of Armenians, where violence persists a theme as constant as the beauty of its culture and its people.

Upon coming to America in the aftermath of the Armenian genocide, Gorky reconstructed a new identity for himself, as he changed his name from Vosdanig Manoug Adoian to Arshile Gorky, a name that harkened to Georgian-Russian aristocracy and literati of the Caucasus region. In 1922, he enrolled at the New School of Design in Boston, a city, which at that time, was home to a large immigrant population of Armenian Americans. When he later moved to New York, where he taught at the National Academy of Design and the Grand Central School of Art, Gorky was thrown into the briskly evolving realm of modern art. As he began to experiment, his early works began to reflect stylistic elements of Pablo Picasso and Paul Cézanne. In her book, Black Angel: The Life of Archile Gorky, Armenian scholar Nouritza Matossian likens seminal influences on Gorky's work and style, including Egyptian funerary art for a pose, Cézanne for flat planar composition, to Picasso for form and color, and to Ingres for simplicity of line and smoothness. These eclectic attributes that seeped into Gorky's paintings show the struggle he endured to become recognized by drawing influence from other great masters.

Through the Westernization of Armenian painting, Gorky was able to communicate his worldview: his memories of the fertile, natural beauty of an idyllic agricultural lifestyle in Armenia, a beauty ruptured by the horrors of bloodshed and violence inflicted by the Armenian genocide on his people. His symbolic depictions of bleeding female fertility against a backdrop of chaos communicate his artistic worldview of how the Late Ottoman Empire ravaged a multi-ethnic empire clean of ethno-linguistic and religious diversity. The dialectic of beauty and violence is one that frames his worldview on representations of genocide through Westernized Armenian painting.

Contemporary Armenian-American artist Mher Khachatryan (b.1983) has produced a series of works to raise awareness of the Armenian genocide.

== Literature ==
Several eyewitness accounts of the events were published, notably those of Swedish missionary Alma Johansson and U.S. Ambassador Henry Morgenthau, Sr. German medic Armin Wegner wrote several books about the events he witnessed while stationed in the Ottoman Empire. Years later, having returned to Germany, Wegner was imprisoned for opposing Nazism, and his books were burnt by the Nazis. Probably the best known literary work on the Armenian genocide is Franz Werfel's 1933 The Forty Days of Musa Dagh. It was a bestseller that became particularly popular among the youth of the Jewish ghettos during the Nazi era. Armenian American writer William Saroyan emphasized the Armenians' ability to survive in his 1935 short story The Armenian and the Armenian.

Kurt Vonnegut's 1988 novel Bluebeard features the Armenian genocide as an underlying theme. Other novels incorporating the Armenian genocide include Louis de Berniéres' Birds without Wings, Edgar Hilsenrath's German-language The Story of the Last Thought, David Kherdian's The Road from Home and Polish author Stefan Żeromski's 1925 The Spring to Come. A story in Edward Saint-Ivan's 2006 anthology "The Black Knight's God" includes a fictional survivor of the Armenian genocide.

A penitence for the genocide is the main theme of Stone Dreams (Daş Yuxular), the novel of the Azerbaijani author Akram Aylisli, written in 2006. After publishing the novel Aylisli was harassed by the state and his books were burnt. The novel Among the Ashes (Küller Arasında), 2009, by the Turkish writer Halil İbrahim Özcan also tells about the Armenian genocide. 2006 novel The Bastard of Istanbul by Elif Shafak tells a Turkish and an Armenian family's hundred-year history that has been affected by the events of 1900s.

The novel by Forget-Me-Not by Tomáš Houška published 2017 tells the emotional story of the girl Narine during Easter 1915. The events of genocide are seen by the eyes of a girl who finds itself in the epicenter of massacres.

The award-winning historical novel Who She Left Behind by Victoria Atamian Waterman published in 2023 by Historium Press is an emotionally heartwrenching story set in various time periods, from the declining days of the Ottoman Empire in Turkey in 1915 to the Armenian neighborhoods of Rhode Island and Massachusetts in the 1990s. The novel completely immerses its reader in a lesser-known era and the untold stories of the brave and resilient women who became the pillars of reconstructed communities after the Armenian Genocide. The multi-cultural philosophical novel The God of Deserted Memories by Prashant Madanmohan explores the psychological aftermath of the Armenian genocide through art, memory, and civilizational loss, weaving fictional reflections with historical trauma.

== Theatre ==
Richard Kalinoski's play, Beast on the Moon, is about two Armenian genocide survivors. Anoush Baghdassarian's play, "FOUND," is a historical fiction play about a woman's experience through the Armenian genocide. It follows the story of a girl named Lucine who is searching for her brother who was taken by Turkish soldiers in 1915 at the start of the genocide. The stage is split in half and while "Old Lucine (1925)" on stage right writes in her diary of memories of the past ten years, "Young Lucine (1915)" acts them out on stage left. It has been performed in New York (2013) and California (2014). In 2014, Devon Jackson's play Nameless premiered at Queen's University in the lead-up to the commemoration of the centenary of the Armenian genocide. A verbatim theatre play on the Armenian genocide, I Wish To Die Singing – Voices From The Armenian Genocide by Neil McPherson (artistic director), played at the Finborough Theatre, London, from 21 April to 16 May 2015.

== Film ==
"Ravished Armenia" (also called "Auction of Souls") was produced in 1919 by the American Committee for Armenian and Syrian Relief based on the memoir of survivor Aurora Mardiganian.

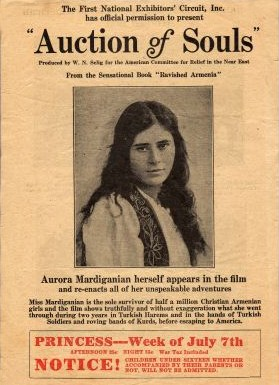
Poster for Ravished Armenia

The first film about the Armenian genocide appeared in 1919, a Hollywood production titled Ravished Armenia. It resonated with acclaimed director Atom Egoyan, influencing his 2002 Ararat. There are also references in Elia Kazan's America, America and Henri Verneuil's Mayrig. At the Berlin Film Festival of 2007 Italian directors Paolo and Vittorio Taviani presented another film about the events, based on Antonia Arslan's book, La Masseria Delle Allodole (The Farm of the Larks).

=== Films ===
- 1919 – Ravished Armenia, a Hollywood film about the real-life story of survivor Aurora Mardiganian
- 1963 – America America (also known as The Anatolian Smile) (dir. Elia Kazan)
- 1977 – Nahapet
- 1979 - Dzori Miro
- 1982 – The Forty Days of Musa Dagh (dir. Sarky Mouradian)
- 1988 - Komitas (dir. Don Askarian),
- 1990 – Yearning (Karot)
- 1991 – Mayrig by Henri Verneuil
- 1992 - Avetik (dir. Don Askarian),
- 2001 - On the Old Roman Road (dir. Don Askarian),
- 2002 – Ararat (dir. Atom Egoyan)
- 2007 – The Lark Farm
- 2009 – Ravished Armenia, restored and edited 24-minute segment of original 1919 film
- 2014 - The Cut (dir. Fatih Akın)
- 2015 - 1915 (dir. Garin Hovannisian)
- 2016 - The Promise directed by Terry George

=== Documentary films ===
- 1945 – Fatherland (dir. G. Balasanyan, L. Isahakyan and G. Zardaryan)
- 1964 – Where Are My People? (dir. J. Michael Hagopian)
- 1975 – The Forgotten Genocide (dir. J. Michael Hagopian)
- 1983 – Assignment Berlin (dir. Hrayr Toukhanian)
- 1988 – An Armenian Journey (dir. Theodore Bogosian)
- 1988 – Back To Ararat (dirs. Jim Downing, Göran Gunér, Per-Åke Holmquist, Suzanne Khardalian)
- 1991 – The Armenian Genocide
- 1992 – Secret History: The Hidden Holocaust (dir. Michael Jones)
- 2000 – I Will Not Be Sad in This World (dir. Karina Epperlein)
- 2000 – Destination Nowhere: The Witness (dir. Dr. J. Michael Hagopian)
- 2003 – Germany and the Secret Genocide (dir. Dr. J. Michael Hagopian)
- 2003 – Voices From the Lake: A Film About the Secret Genocide (dir. J. Michael Hagopian)
- 2003 – Desecration (dir. Hrair "Hawk" Khatcherian)
- 2003 – The Armenian Genocide: A Look Through Our Eyes (dir. Vatche Arabian)
- 2004 – My Son Shall Be Armenian (dir. Hagop Goudsouzian)
- 2006 – The Armenian Genocide (dir. Andrew Goldberg)
- 2006 – Screamers (dir. Carla Garapedian)
- 2008 – The River Ran Red (dir. J. Michael Hagopian)
- 2010 – Aghet – Ein Völkermord (dir. Eric Friedler)
- 2011 – Grandma's Tattoos (dir. Suzanne Khardalian)
- 2014 - Orphans of the Genocide (dir. Bared Maronian)
- 2016 – Women of 1915 (dir. Bared Maronian)
- 2017 – Intent to Destroy (dir. Joe Berlinger)
- 2022 – Aurora's Sunrise (dir. Inna Sahakyan)

== Music ==
American band System of a Down, composed of four descendants of Armenian genocide survivors, has raised awareness of the genocide through its music, releasing multiple songs and promoting them with music videos and performing in concerts.

In late 2003, Diamanda Galás released the album Defixiones: Will and Testament, an 80-minute memorial tribute to the Armenian, Assyrian and Greek victims of the genocide in Turkey. "The performance is an angry meditation on genocide and the politically cooperative denial of it, in particular the Turkish and American denial of the Armenian, Assyrian, and Anatolian Greek genocides from 1914 to 1923".

=== Songs and compositions ===
| Year | Title | Artist | Notes |
|---|---|---|---|
| 1915 | "Children's Prayer" | Komitas | |
| 1916-18 | "Zmrkhtuhi" | Romanos Melikian | a song cycle |
| 1917 | "Take, O Armenia" | Alexander Spendiaryan | opus 27, concert aria, words by H. Hovhannisian |
| 1939 | "Symphony No. 1" | Alan Hovhaness | |
| 1946 | "Vorskan akhper" | Aram Khachaturian | arrangement for the II Symphony (by Avetik Isahakian) |
| 1961 | "Poem about the Armenian People" | Alexander Arutiunian | words by Gevork Emin |
| 1964 | "The Great Crime" | H. Stepanian | words by Paruyr Sevak |
| 1974 | "Requiem on Memoriam of Perished People" | Loris Tjeknavorian | symphonic work |
| 1975 | "Il symphony" | G. Hakhinyan | words by Paruyr Sevak |
| 1975 | "Requiem aeternam" | Hampartzoum Berberian | words by Yeghishe Charents |
| 1975 | "Ils sont tombés" (They Fell) | Charles Aznavour | |
| 1977 | "Oratoria-1915" | E. Hayrapetyan | |
| 1978 | "The Death" | Harutiun Dellalian | a symphonic poem |
| 1981 | untitled | Edvard Baghdasaryan | soundtrack for the film Dzori Miro |
| 1984 | "A Memorial to the Martyrs" | Harutiun Dellalian, Georges Garvarentz and Gostan Zarian | |
| 1984 | "The Voice of Victims" | Yervand Yerkanyan | a symphony |
| 1985 | "Oratorium in Memory of the Victims of the Armenian Genocide of 1915" | Khachatur Avetisyan and Ludwig Doorian | choir, soloïsts, orchestra with traditional instruments |
| 1986 | "Sebastia" | Krematorij (Armen Grigoryan) | |
| 1998 | "P.L.U.C.K." | System of a Down | from the album System of a Down |
| 2000 | "A handful of ash from your ashes ..." | Artin Poturlyan | for harp |
| 2001 | "X" | System of a Down | from the album Toxicity |
| 2003 | "Defixiones: Will and Testament" | Diamanda Galás | |
| 2005 | "Holy Mountains" | System of a Down | from the album Hypnotize |
| 2005 | "Adana" | Daniel Decker and Ara Gevorgyan | has been translated into 17 languages and recorded by singers around the world. |
| 2008 | "Down Below" | Petros Ovsepyan | |
| 2008 | "Tsitsernakabert" | Andrey Kasparov | For modern dance and six musicians: alto flute, bass/ contrabass flute, violin, two percussionists, and mezzo-soprano. The work was inspired by the memorial of the same name, situated in Yerevan, capital of Armenia. |
| 2008 | "Another Land" | No One Is Innocent | |
| 2008 | "Exploding/Reloading" | Scars on Broadway | from the self-titled album Scars on Broadway |
| 2010 | "Yes, It's Genocide" | Serj Tankian | from the album Imperfect Harmonies |
| 2011 | "The Song about Armenia" Oratorio | Alexander Brincken | words by D.Varushan, Siamanto, A.Isahakyan and V.Davtyan |
| 2012 | "A Rainy Day in April" | Arusyak Sahakian | played by 42 Turkish musicians |
| 2013 | "The Armenian Genocide" | Julian Cope | from the album Revolutionary Suicide |
| 2013 | "Open Wounds" | R-Mean | from the album Broken Water |
| 2014 | "In the Shadow of Ararat" | Joseph Bohigian | for flute, clarinet, violin, cello, vibraphone, and piano |
| 2015 | "Cantata for Living Martyrs" | Serouj Kradjian | for orchestra and chorus |
| 2015 | "Luys i Luso" | Tigran Hamasyan | for piano and voices |
| 2015 | "Silent Cranes" | Mary Kouyoumdjian | for string quartet (commissioned by Kronos Quartet) |
| 2015 | "Face The Shadow" | Genealogy | performed at the 2015 Eurovision Song Contest |
| 2015 | "Aprelu April" | Inga and Anush Arshakyan | |
| 2015 | "Notes from the Silent One" | Zeynep Gedizlioğlu | commissioned by the Dresdner Sinfoniker |
| 2015 | "Massaker, hört ihr MASSAKER!" | Helmut Oehring | commissioned by the Dresdner Sinfoniker |
| 2016 | "Halki / Heybeliada" | Yiğit Kolat | |
| 2018 | "Lives" | Daron Malakian and Scars on Broadway | from the album " Dictator " |
| 2020 | "Genocidal Humanoidz" | System of a Down | Released as a charity single along with "Protect the Land" amid the 2020 Nagorno-Karabakh war |

== Gallery ==
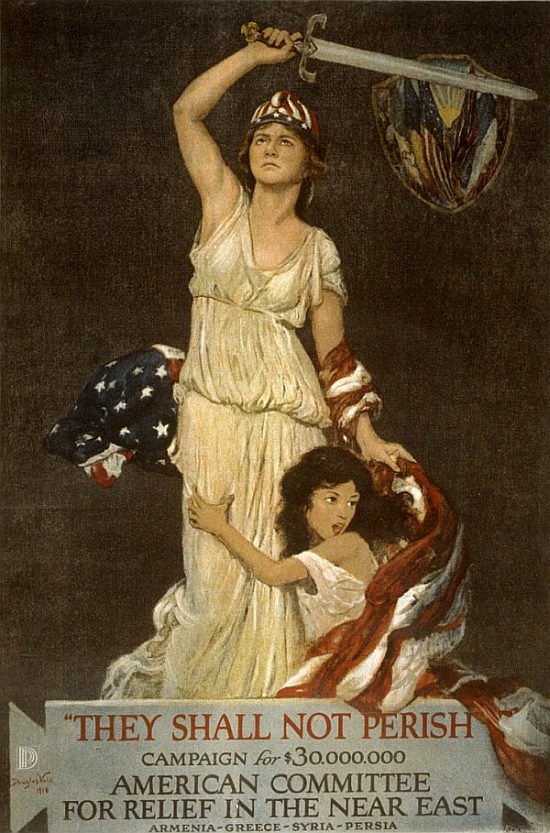
They Shall Not Perish: American Committee for Relief in the Near East, poster by Douglas Volk, 1918.

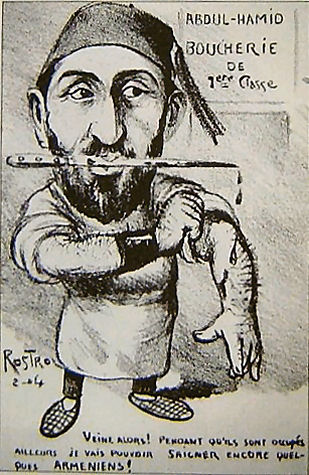
Political cartoon portraying Sultan Hamid as a butcher for his harsh actions against the Ottoman Armenians

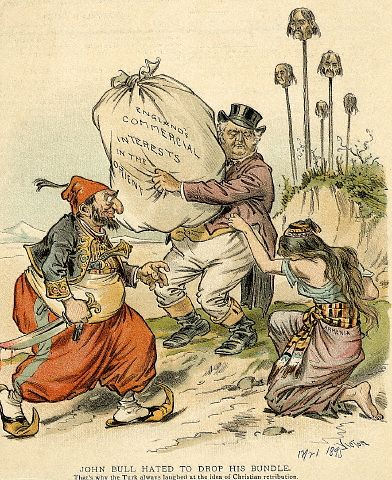
"John Bull hated to drop his bundle ..." Political cartoon about "England's commercial interests in the Orient". The woman represents Armenia.

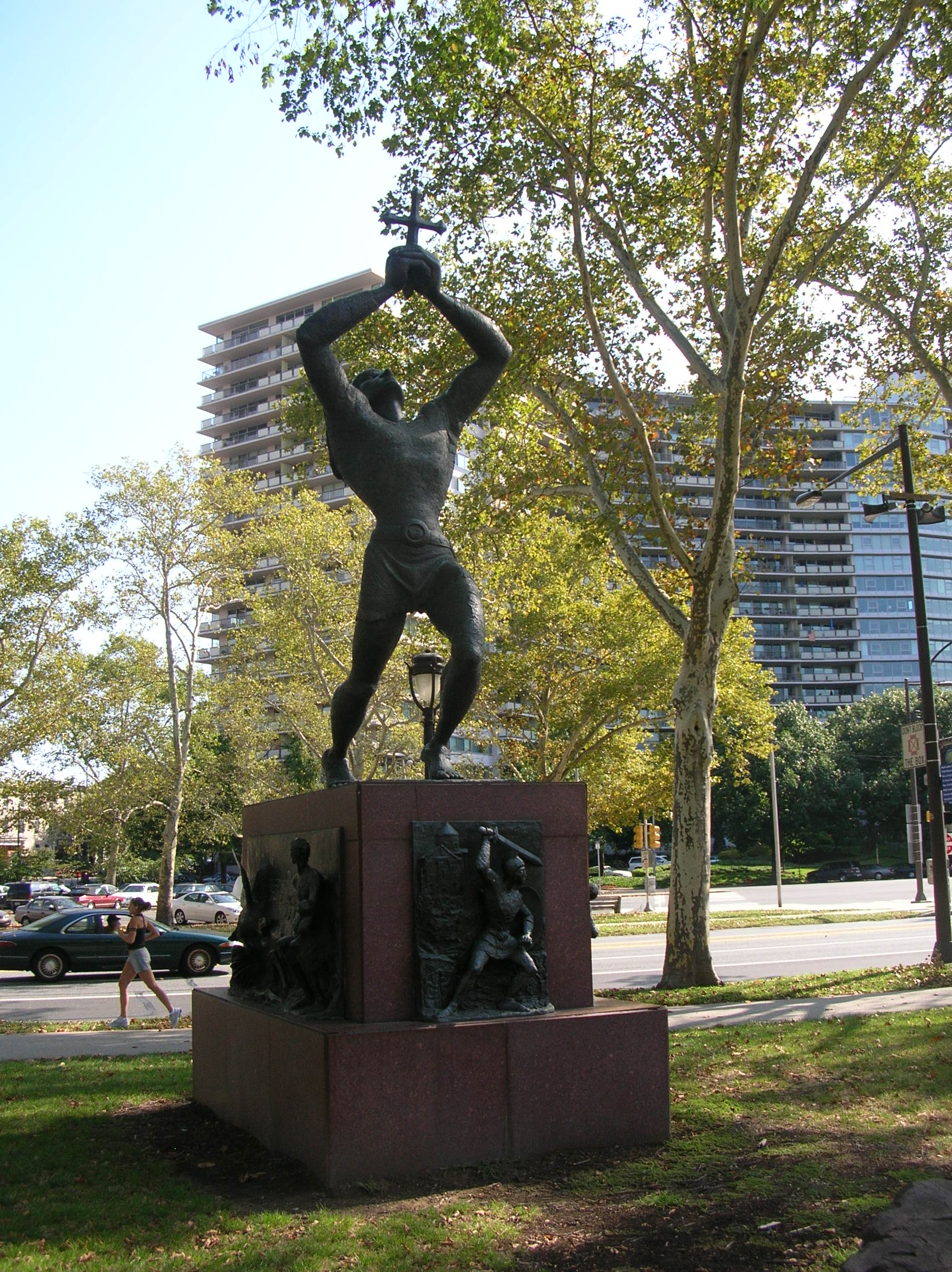
Philadelphia Museum of Art – Armenian Genocide Memorial

== See also ==
- 100th anniversary of the Armenian genocide
- List of visitors to Tsitsernakaberd
