= Glenn Farr =

American film and TV editor (1946–2023)

- Born: March 28, 1946
- Died: May 25, 2023 (aged 77)
- Occupation: Film editor
- Years active: 1973–2017

Glenn Farr (March 28, 1946 – May 25, 2023) was an American film and television editor who was one of the five film editors to win the Academy Award for Best Film Editing during the 56th Academy Awards for the film The Right Stuff. He shared his win with Lisa Fruchtman, Tom Rolf, Stephen A. Rotter and Douglas Stewart. He died from complications from a brain tumor on May 25, 2023, at the age of 77.

== Selected filmography ==
Editor
Year	Film	Director	Notes
1980	Fatso	Anne Bancroft	
1983	The Right Stuff	Philip Kaufman	
1984	Runaway	Michael Crichton	First collaboration with Michael Crichton
1985	Commando	Mark L. Lester	
1986	Nothing in Common	Garry Marshall	
1987	Real Men	Dennis Feldman	
1988	The Serpent and the Rainbow	Wes Craven	
1989	Physical Evidence	Michael Crichton	Second collaboration with Michael Crichton
1989	Old Gringo	Luis Puenzo	
1991	Shattered	Wolfgang Petersen	
1991	Career Opportunities	Bryan Gordon	
1992	Out on a Limb	Francis Veber	
2004	The Dust Factory	Eric Small	
2006	Akeelah and the Bee	Doug Atchison	

Editorial department
Year	Film	Director	Role	Notes
1973	A Matter of Winning	Kieth Merrill	Assistant editor	
1974	Harry and Tonto	Paul Mazursky	Assistant editor	First collaboration with Paul Mazursky
1975	W.W. and the Dixie Dancekings	John G. Avildsen	Assistant film editor	
1976	Next Stop, Greenwich Village	Paul Mazursky	Assistant editor	Second collaboration with Paul Mazursky
1993	The Temp	Tom Holland	Additional editor	
1999	Brokedown Palace	Jonathan Kaplan	Additional editor	
2017	Bokeh	Geoffrey Orthwein; Andrew Sullivan	Editing consultant	

Thanks
Year	Film	Director	Role
2005	Aurora Borealis	James C.E. Burke	Special thanks

Direct-to-video films

Thanks
Year	Film	Director	Role
1994	Fortunes of War	Thierry Notz	The producers wish to thank

Documentaries

Editor
Year	Film	Director
1981	This Is Elvis	Andrew Solt; Malcolm Leo
1983	Gospel	David Leivick; Frederick A. Ritzenberg

Editorial department
Year	Film	Director	Role
1971	Joe Cocker: Mad Dogs & Englishmen	Pierre Adidge	Assistant editor
1972	Elvis on Tour	Pierre Adidge; Robert Abel	Post-production coordinator

Music department
Year	Film	Director	Role
1971	Soul to Soul	Denis Sanders	Music editor

Producer
Year	Film	Director	Credit
1999	Voices from the Lake	J. Michael Hagopian	Producer

Production manager
Year	Film	Director	Role
1973	Let the Good Times Roll	Robert Abel; Sidney Levin	Post-production supervisor

Thanks
Year	Film	Director	Role
1995	Frank and Ollie	Theodore Thomas	Special thanks
2006	Screamers	Carla Garapedian	Thanks

Direct-to-video documentaries

Editor
Year	Film	Director
1987	Oh Happy Day	David Leivick; Frederick A. Ritzenberg

Additional crew
Year	Film	Director	Role
2008	The River Ran Red	J. Michael Hagopian	Production consultant

Shorts

Thanks
Year	Film	Director	Role
2001	The Rib	Mary Ann Skweres	The director and producers wish to thank

TV documentaries

Editor
Year	Film	Director
1979	Heroes of Rock and Roll	Andrew Solt; Malcolm Leo

Editorial department
Year	Film	Director	Role
1978	Bing Crosby: His Life and Legend	Marshall Flaum	Supervising editor

TV movies

Editor
Year	Film	Director
1986	The B.R.A.T. Patrol	Mollie Miller
1989	Mothers, Daughters and Lovers	Matthew Robbins
1994	Confessions of a Sorority Girl	Uli Edel
1995	Broken Trust	Geoffrey Sax
1996	Norma Jean & Marilyn	Tim Fywell
1998	Everything That Rises	Dennis Quaid
1998	Hard Time	Burt Reynolds
1999	Hard Time: Hostage Hotel	Hal Needham
2000	The Spring	David Jackson
2000	The Darkling	Po-Chih Leong
2002	Johnson County War	David S. Cass Sr.

Editorial department
Year	Film	Director	Role
2000	American Tragedy	Lawrence Schiller	Additional editor

TV series

Editor
Year	Title	Notes
1977	ABC Weekend Special	1 episode
1985	National Geographic Explorer	1 episode
1986	The Disney Sunday Movie	1 episode
2002	Johnson County War	—N/a
2007	Rome	5 episodes
2007	K-Ville	4 episodes
2008−12	The Mentalist	33 episodes
2012−13	Nashville	5 episodes
2015	Wayward Pines	1 episode

Editorial department
Year	Title	Role	Notes
1972	National Geographic Specials	Assistant editor	3 episodes
2015	Wayward Pines	Additional editing by	1 episode

Sound department
Year	Title	Role	Notes
1972	National Geographic Specials	Sound recordist	1 episode

TV shorts

Editor
Year	Film	Director
1977	My Dear Uncle Sherlock	Arthur H. Nadel
