= List of Armenian films before 1920 =

== 1910s ==
| Title | Director | Cast | Genre | Notes |
|---|---|---|---|---|
1915
1916
1917
1919
| Ravished Armenia | Oscar Apfel | Aurora Mardiganian; Irving Cummings; Anna Q. Nilsson; Henry Morgenthau; Lillian West | Documentary | Based on the autobiographical book Ravished Armenia by Mardiganian about her experiences in the Armenian genocide. |
