= Rape during the Armenian genocide =

1915–1917 war crimes in the Ottoman Empire

Armin Wegner's description: "Looking at you is the dark [and] beautiful face of Babesheea who was robbed by Kurds, raped, and freed only after ten days; like a wild beast the Turkish soldiers, officers, and gendarmes swept down on this welcome prey. All the crimes that had ever been committed against women, were committed here. They cut off their breasts, mutilated their limbs, and their corpses lay naked, defiled, or blackened by the heat on the fields."

During the Armenian genocide, which occurred in the Ottoman Empire, led at the time by the Young Turks, the Turkish armed forces, militias, and members of the public engaged in a systematic campaign of genocidal rape against female Armenians and children of both sexes. Before the genocide had begun, one method used to intimidate the Armenian population was sexual humiliation. (Note: "Violence against women was a central feature of the Armenian genocide. Even before the mass killings, sexual humiliation was used to intimidate the Armenian community. After the murder of the Armenian leadership and men of military age, Ottoman authorities and Ittihadist supporters deported surviving Armenians from Anatolia into the Syrian desert. During this ethnic cleansing, rape, kidnapping, sex slavery, and forced re-marriage became de facto instruments of genocide. Eyewitness accounts and diplomatic reports shed light on the place of gender during genocidal persecution.") Women and young girls were not only subjected to rape, but also forced marriage, torture, forced prostitution, slavery and sexual mutilation.

Heinrich Bergfeld, the German consul to Trabzon, reported "the numerous rapes of women and girls," a crime he regarded as being part of a plan for "the virtually complete extermination of the Armenians." The systematic use of rape during the genocide was testified to by Turkish, American, Austrian, and German witnesses and officials.

== Background ==
In the years between 1850 and 1870, the Patriarch of Armenia submitted 537 letters to the Sublime Porte asking for help to protect Armenians from the violent abuse and social and political injustice they were subjected to. He requested the people be protected from "brigandage, murder, abduction and rape of women and children, confiscatory taxes, and fraud and extortion by local officials."

Within the legal system, the Armenian communities had their own prisons and court systems, and were able to hold civil cases for issues between Christians and Muslims. Within the Islamic judicial system, however, the Armenians had no recourse. A Muslim was allowed to request a hearing before a religious court, in which testimony from non-Muslims would be disallowed or given little value. All a Muslim needed to do to get a case settled was swear on the Qur'an. Because of this, the Armenians, as well as other dhimmis, had little hope within the judicial system. According to Peter Balakian, "a well-armed Kurd or Turk could not only steal his [Armenian] host's possessions but could rape or kidnap the women and girls of the household with impunity." "The amount of theft and extortion, as well as rape and abduction of Armenian women, that was allowed under this Ottoman legal system, placed the Armenians in perpetual jeopardy."

In 1895, Frederick Davis Greene, published The Armenian Crisis in Turkey: The Massacre of 1894, Its Antecedents and Significance. The book made note of the fact that men were murdered out of hand, while the women and children suffered appalling sexual attacks. In one incident he described,

A lot of women, variously estimated from 60 to 160 in number, were shut up in a church, and the soldiers were "let loose" among them. Many were outraged (Note: The word "outrage" was, in this context, a Victorian euphemism for rape.) to death, and the remainder dispatched with sword and bayonet. Children were placed in a row, one behind another, and a bullet fired down the line, apparently to see how many could be dispatched with one bullet. Infants and small children were piled one on the other and their heads struck off.

The genocide of 1915 was planned well in advance. A document obtained by Commander C. H. Heathcote Smith of the British Naval Volunteer Service, which was dubbed "The Ten Commandments", gave a detailed account of how the genocide was to be carried out"

1. Profiting by Arts: 3 and 4 of Comité Union and Progres, close all Armenian Societies, and arrest all who worked against Government at any time among them and send them into the provinces such as Bagdad or Mosul, and wipe them out either on the road or there.
2. Collect arms.
3. Excite Moslem opinion by suitable and special means, in places as Van, Erzeroum, Adana, where as a point of fact the Armenians have already won the hatred of the Moslems, provoke organised massacres as the Russians did at Baku.
4. Leave all executive to the people in the provinces such as Erzeroum, Van, Mumuret ul Aziz, and Bitlis, and use Military disciplinary forces (i.e. Gendarmerie) ostensibly to stop massacres, while on the contrary in places as Adana, Sivas, Broussa, Ismidt and Smyrna actively help the Moslems with military force.
5. Apply measures to exterminate all males under 50, priests and teachers, leave girls and children to be Islamized.
6. Carry away the families of all who succeed in escaping and apply measures to cut them off from all connection with their native place.
7. On the ground that Armenian officials may be spies, expel and drive them out absolutely from every Government department or post.
8. Kill off in an appropriate manner all Armenians in the Army - this to be left to the military to do.
9. All action to begin everywhere simultaneously, and thus leave no time for preparation of defensive measures.
10. Pay attention to the strictly confidential nature of these instructions, which may not go beyond two or three persons.

The genocide began following the outbreak of World War I. Armenians serving in the Turkish armed forces were removed and killed. The Armenian civilian population were sent on forced marches and denied food and water. In a strategy similar to the genocidal tactics used by the German Empire in German South-West Africa, the Armenians were forced into the desert. While marching, the women, the young girls and the boys were systematically raped, mutilated and tortured. Hundreds of thousands died on these forced marches.

== Rape as genocide ==
During the Armenian genocide, the rape of young girls was well documented; they would be assaulted in their homes before forced relocation, or on the forced marches into the Syrian desert. An eyewitness testified, "It was a very common thing for them to rape our girls in our presence. Very often they violated eight or ten year old girls, and as a consequence many would be unable to walk, and were shot." Another testified that every girl in her village aged over twelve, and some who were younger, had been raped.

Women were gang raped and often committed suicide afterwards. Once the men had been separated from the women, the women were systematically raped and killed, along with any children. According to eyewitness accounts, the practice of rape was "more or less universal". Armenians "were often killed in festivals of cruelty which involved rape and other forms of torture." The women were sexually assaulted on a daily basis, and many were forced to work as prostitutes. Many were killed by bayoneting, or died from exposure or prolonged sexual abuse.

In 2008, A. Dirk Moses described genocide as a "total social practice." Within this context, rape can be viewed as an integral part of genocide. Genocides usually involve attacking the familial roles of the victims, which are the ways they contribute to the reproduction of the targeted group as perceived by the perpetrators. Commonalities across all genocides are the murder of infants in front of parents, forced rape of women by family members, and the violation and mutilation of the reproductive systems.

The Armenian genocide is a prime example of these behaviors. The attackers follow a pattern of family based destruction. In attacks on villages men were killed, and the surviving population were raped, forcibly displaced or killed. Another purpose of the rapes was eliticide, the destruction of a group's leadership, which was then used to create confusion. This gave a public demonstration of the mastery the attackers had over the Armenian populace, and caused "total suffering" on both sexes, as they bore witness to sexual assault and the torture of those they loved.

=== Instances and accounts ===
According to Taner Akçam, forced prostitution, rape and sexual abuse were widespread, and military commanders told their men to "Do to them whatever you wish". Members of the German armed forces in Der Zor helped to open a brothel. Throughout the genocide the men were given free licence to do as they pleased with Armenian women. Armenian women and children were displayed naked in auctions in Damascus, where they were sold as sex slaves. The trafficking of Armenian women as sex slaves was an important source of income for accompanying soldiers. In Arab areas, enslaved Armenian women were sold at low prices. The German consul at Mosul reported that the maximum price for an Armenian woman was "5 piastres" (about 20 Pence Sterling at the time).

Karen Jeppe, who was working for the League of Nations in Aleppo and was attempting to free the tens of thousands of women and children who had been abducted, said in 1926 that out of the thousands of women she had spoken to, only one had not been sexually abused.

Rössler, the German consul in Aleppo during the genocide, heard from an "objective" Armenian that around a quarter of young women, whose appearance was "more or less pleasing", were regularly raped by the gendarmes, and that "even more beautiful ones" were violated by 10-15 men. This resulted in girls and women being left behind dying, naked.

Aurora (Arshaluys) Mardiganian, who emigrated to the United States after escaping through Europe, brought the story of mass rapes during the Armenian genocide to public attention through her 1918 memoir Ravished Armenia, which served as the basis for the 1919 silent film, Auction of Souls. The Aurora Prize for Awakening Humanity is named in her honor.

== War crimes trials ==
Following the end of World War I, the British exerted pressure on the Sultan to bring to trial the leadership of the Committee of Union and Progress (CUP) for crimes against humanity. By April 1919 over 100 Turkish officials had been arrested.

Testimony given by Nuri, the police chief of Trabzon, claimed that he had been given young girls, as a gift from the governor-general to the CUP central committee. A merchant by name of Mehmed Ali testified that not only were children being killed at the Red Crescent Hospital, but that young girls were also being raped and that the governor-general held there fifteen girls for his sexual gratification. Hasan Maruf, a military officer, testified to the British that "Government officials at Trebizond picked out some of the prettiest Armenian women of the best families. After committing the worst outrages on them, they had them killed."

The court found the lieutenant governor Mehmed Kemal Bey, of the district of Yozgat, guilty of murder and forced relocation; he was sentenced to death by hanging. Major Tevfik Bey, a commander of police was also found guilty and sentenced 15 years in prison with hard labour.

== See also ==
- Vorpahavak
- Slavery in Iraq
- Slavery in Saudi Arabia
- Slavery in Syria

== Bibliography ==
- Akçam, Taner (2012). The Young Turks' Crime against Humanity: The Armenian Genocide and Ethnic Cleansing in the Ottoman Empire. Princeton University Press. ISBN 978-0691153339.
- Balakian, Peter (2004). The Burning Tigris: The Armenian Genocide and America's Response. Harpercollins. ISBN 978-0060558703.
- Ball, Howard (2011). Genocide A Reference Handbook. ABC-CLIO. ISBN 978-1-59884-489-4.
- Bjørnlund, Matthias (2011). "'A Fate Worse Than Dying': Sexual Violence during the Armenian Genocide". In Dagmar Herzog (ed.). Brutality and Desire: War and Sexuality in Europe's Twentieth Century. Palgrave Macmillan. ISBN 978-0230285637.
- Dadrian, Vahakn N. (1993). "The Secret Young-Turk Ittihadist Conference and the Decision for the World War I Genocide of the Armenians". Holocaust and Genocide Studies. 7 (2). Oxford University Press: 173–201. doi:10.1093/hgs/7.2.173.
- Dadrian, Vahakn N. (2008). "The Armenian Genocide: an interpretation". In Jay Winter (ed.). America and the Armenian Genocide of 1915. Cambridge University Press. pp. 52–102. ISBN 978-0521071239.
- DeLaet, Debra (2005). The Global Struggle for Human Rights. Wadsworth Publishing. ISBN 978-0534635725.
- Derderian, Katharine (2005). "Common Fate, Different Experience: Gender-Specific Aspects of the Armenian Genocide, 1915-1917". Holocaust and Genocide Studies. 19 (1): 1–25. doi:10.1093/hgs/dci001. PMID 20684092.
- Herzog, Dagmar (2011). Sexuality in Europe: A Twentieth-Century History. Cambridge University Press. ISBN 978-0521691437.
- Jacobs, Steven L. (2003). "Raphael Lemkin and the Armenian Genocide". In Richard G. Hovannisian (ed.). Looking Backward, Moving Forward: Confronting the Armenian Genocide. Transaction. pp. 125–136. ISBN 978-0765805195.
- Joyce Frey, Rebecca (2009). Genocide and International Justice. Facts On File. ISBN 978-0816073108.
- Khosroeva, Anahit (2007). "The Assyrian Genocide in the Ottoman Empire and Adjacent Territories". In Richard G. Hovannisian (ed.). The Armenian Genocide: Cultural and Ethical Legacies. Transaction. pp. 267–290. ISBN 978-1412806190.
- Miller, Donald Earl; Miller, Lorna Touryan (1999). Survivors: An Oral History of the Armenian Genocide. University of California Press. ISBN 978-0520219564.
- Monroe, Kristen R. (2011). Ethics in an Age of Terror and Genocide: Identity and Moral Choice. Princeton University Press. ISBN 978-0691151434.
- Moses, A. Dirk (2008). A. Dirk Moses (ed.). Empire, Colony, Genocide: Conquest, Occupation, and Subaltern Resistance in World History. Berghahn. ISBN 978-1845454524.
- Nabti, Najwa (2016). "Legacy of Impunity: Sexual Violence against Armenian Women and Girls during the Genocide". The Armenian Genocide Legacy. Palgrave Macmillan UK. pp. 118–133. ISBN 978-1-137-56163-3.
- Smith, Roger W. (2013). "Genocide and the Politics of Rape". In Joyce Apsel, Ernesto Verdeja (ed.). Genocide Matters: Ongoing Issues and Emerging Perspectives. Routledge. pp. 82–105. ISBN 978-0415814966.
- Theriault, Henry C. (2007). "Rethinking Dehumanization in Genocide". In Richard G. Hovannisian (ed.). The Armenian Genocide: Cultural and Ethical Legacies. Transaction. pp. 27–41. ISBN 978-1412806190.
- Von Joeden-Forgey, Elisa (2010). "Gender and Genocide". In Donald Bloxham, A. Dirk Moses (ed.). The Oxford Handbook of Genocide Studies. Oxford University Press. pp. 61–80. ISBN 978-0199232116.
