= Aram Hamparian =

Armenian American public activist (born 1966)

- Born: April 18, 1966 (age 60)
- Occupation: Political activist
- Organization: ANCA

Aram Suren Hamparian (born April 18, 1966) is an Armenian American political activist who is the executive director of Armenian National Committee of America.

As ANCA executive director, Hamparian serves as the organization's national point-person with the administration, United States Congress, the media, and the Washington, D.C., foreign policy community. In cooperation with Eastern and Western U.S. regional offices, more than 60 local chapters, dozens of coalition partners, hundreds of community affiliates, and thousands of grassroots activists, he works on a broad range of legislative, policy, research, political, campaign, media, coalition, and community-related concerns. Hamparian has testified before Congress, lectured at the National Defense University, the Foreign Service Institute, and USAID, been quoted by The New York Times, The Wall Street Journal, The Washington Post, Associated Press, Reuters, and has appeared on CNN.

== See also ==
- Armenian National Committee of America
- Screamers (2006 film)
