= The Right to Love (1930 American film) =

1930 film

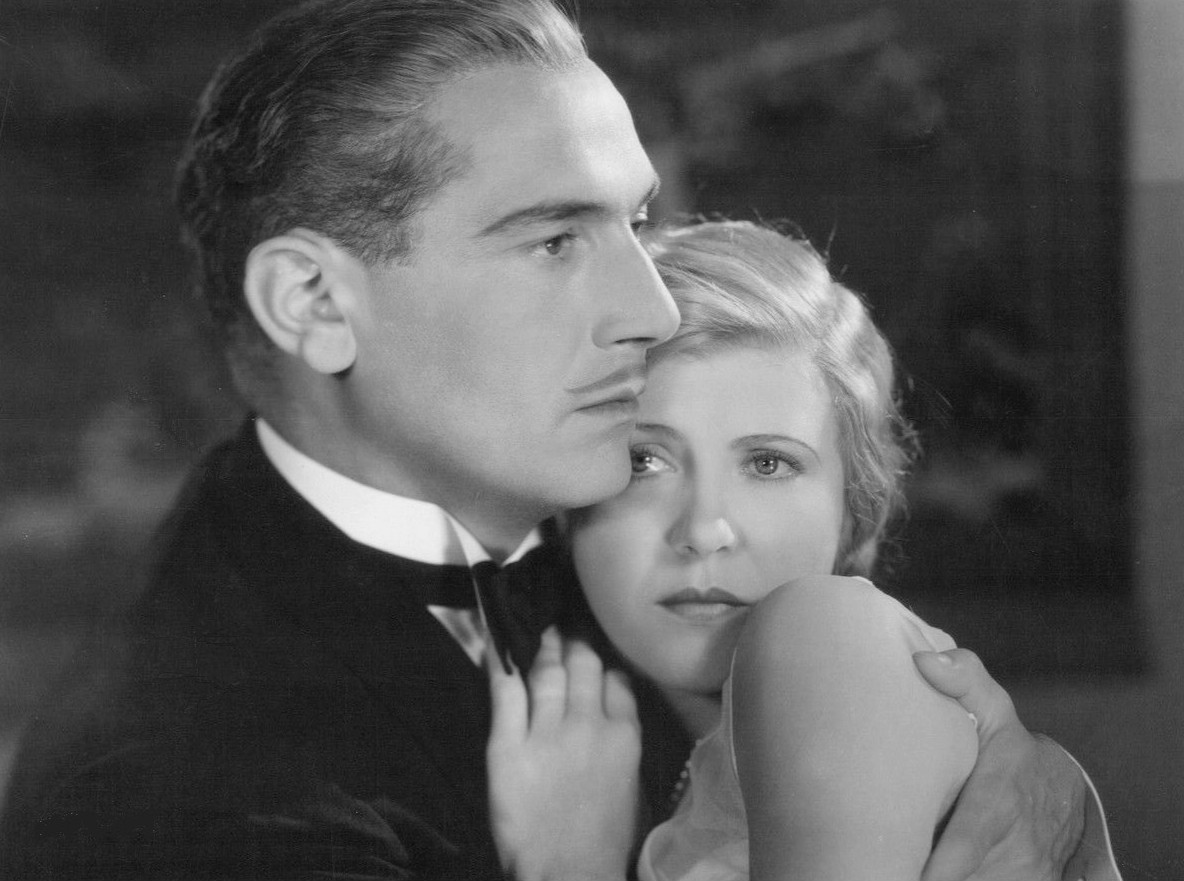
- Paul Lukas and Ruth Chatterton
- Directed by: Richard Wallace
- Written by: Zoe Akins; Susan Glaspell (novel-Brook Evans)
- Starring: Ruth Chatterton; Paul Lukas; David Manners
- Cinematography: Charles Lang
- Edited by: Eda Warren
- Music by: Karl Hajos (uncredited); W. Franke Harling (uncredited)
- Distributed by: Paramount Pictures
- Release date: December 27, 1930
- Running time: 79 minutes
- Country: United States
- Language: English

The Right to Love is a 1930 American pre-Code drama film which was nominated at the 4th Academy Awards for Best Cinematography (for Charles Lang). It was based on Susan Glaspell's 1928 novel Brook Evans.

== Premise ==
A woman learns she is illegitimate.

== Cast ==
- Ruth Chatterton as Brooks Evans/Naomi Kellogg
- Paul Lukas as Eric
- David Manners as Joe Copeland
- Irving Pichel as Caleb Evans
- Louise Mackintosh as Mrs. Copeland
- Oscar Apfel as William Kellogg
- Veda Buckland as Mrs. Kellogg
- Robert Parrish as Willie
- Lillian West as Martha
- George C. Pearce as Dr. Scudder (credited as George Pearce)
