= Jeff Atmajian =

American composer

Jeff Atmajian (born 1960 in Fresno, California) is a composer, arranger and orchestrator for films. His regular clientele include composers such as James Newton Howard, Marc Shaiman, Rachel Portman, Mark Watters, John Debney and Gabriel Yared. His composing credits are primarily for short films. In 2006, he scored the 90-minute documentary about the Armenian genocide called Screamers. In 2024, he updated the orchestrations for the songs for the two-part film adaptation of Wicked.
