= Shadows (1916 film) =

1916 film

- Directed by: B. Reeves Eason
- Starring: Frank Mayo
- Release date: June 2, 1916
- Country: United States
- Languages: Silent; English intertitles

Shadows is a 1916 American short film directed by B. Reeves Eason.

== Cast ==
- Frank Mayo
- Philo McCullough
- Harry Southard
- Lillian West
