= Vorpahavak =

Armenian genocide phrase

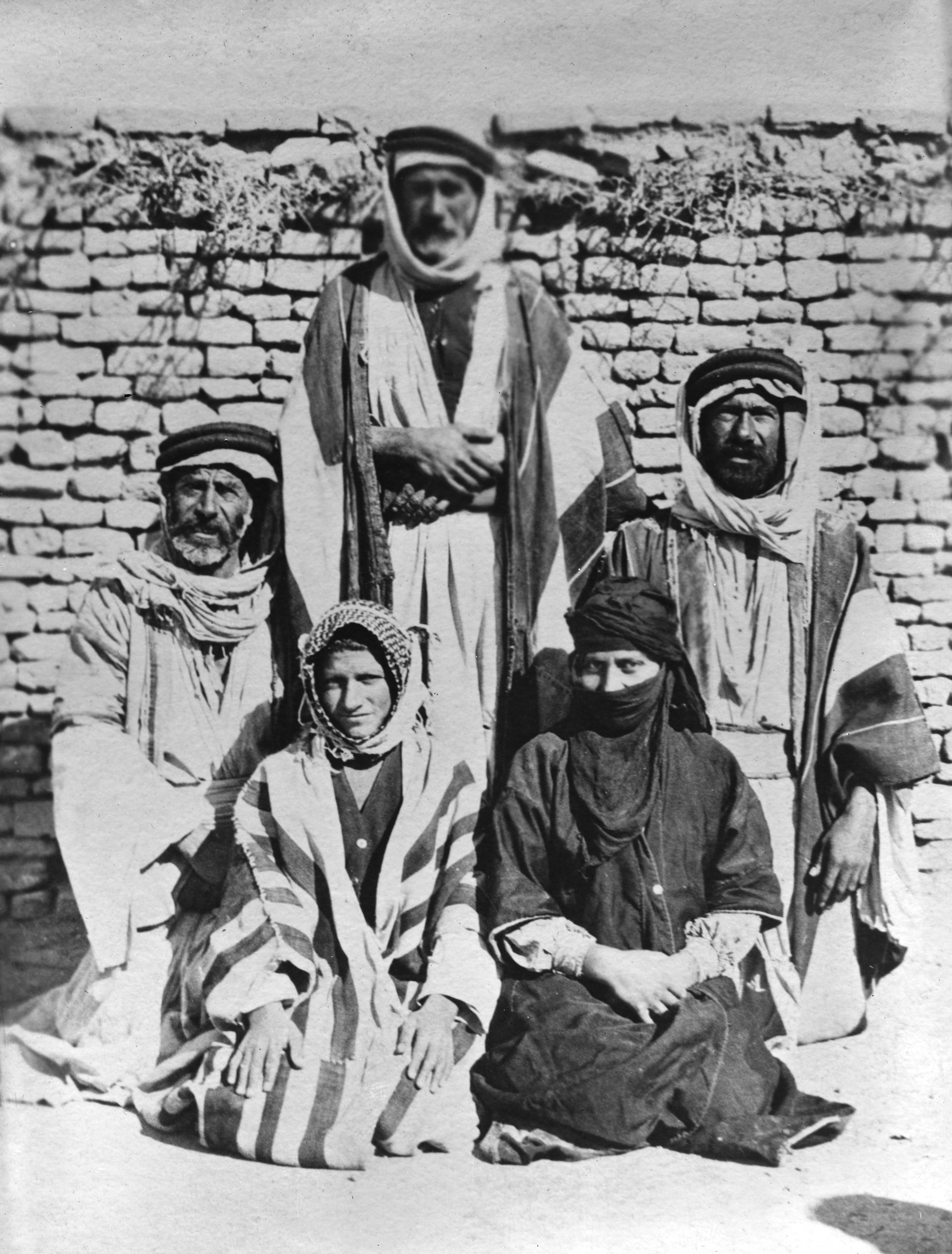
Library of Congress caption: "Armenians rescued from Arabs"

Following the Armenian genocide, vorpahavak (Armenian: որբահաւաք; lit. 'gathering of orphans') was the organized effort to rescue "hidden" Armenian women and children who had survived the genocide by being abducted and adopted into Muslim families and forcibly converted to Islam.

== See also ==
- Rape during the Armenian genocide
- Forced religious conversion
- Orphans of the Genocide
- Turkification
- Kurdification
- Slavery in Iraq
- Slavery in Saudi Arabia
- Slavery in Syria

== Sources ==
- Adjemian, Boris; Suciyan, Talin (2017). "Making space and community through memory:. Orphans and Armenian Jerusalem in the Nubar Library's photographic archive". Études arméniennes contemporaines (9): 75–113. doi:10.4000/eac.1129. ISSN 2269-5281.
- Ekmekçioğlu, Lerna (2013). "A Climate for Abduction, a Climate for Redemption: The Politics of Inclusion during and after the Armenian Genocide". Comparative Studies in Society and History. 55 (3): 522–553. doi:10.1017/S0010417513000236. hdl:1721.1/88911. ISSN 0010-4175. JSTOR 23526015. S2CID 145218244.
- Gzoyan, Ē. (2025). The Silenced Crime: Forcible Child Transfer During the Armenian Genocide. Armenian history and culture. Brill Deutschland. ISBN 978-3-506-79772-8.
- Maksudyan, Nazan (2020). "The Orphan Nation: Gendered Humanitarianism for Armenian Survivor Children in Istanbul, 1919–1922". Gendering Global Humanitarianism in the Twentieth Century: Practice, Politics and the Power of Representation. Springer International Publishing. pp. 117–142. ISBN 978-3-030-44630-7.
- Naguib, Nefissa (2008). "A Nation Of Widows And Orphans: Armenian Memories Of Relief In Jerusalem". Interpreting Welfare and Relief in the Middle East. BRILL. pp. 35–56. doi:10.1163/ej.9789004164369.i-244.13. ISBN 978-90-04-16436-9.
- Tachjian, Vahé (2009). "Gender, nationalism, exclusion: the reintegration process of female survivors of the Armenian genocide". Nations and Nationalism. 15 (1): 60–80. doi:10.1111/j.1469-8129.2009.00366.x.
- Watenpaugh, Keith David (2010). "The League of Nations' Rescue of Armenian Genocide Survivors and the Making of Modern Humanitarianism, 1920–1927". The American Historical Review. 115 (5): 1315–1339. doi:10.1086/ahr.115.5.1315. PMID 21246885.
