= The Armenian and the Armenian =

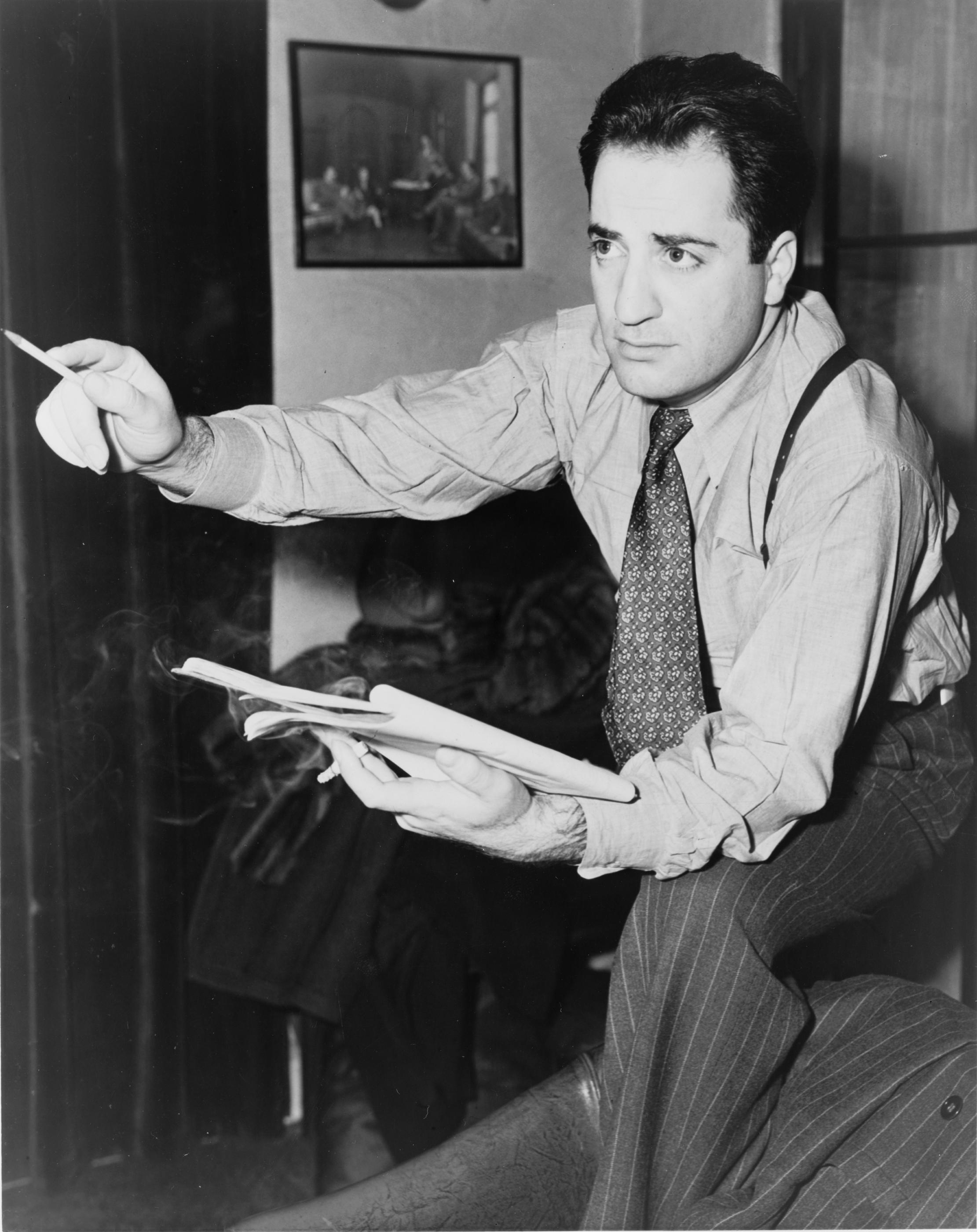
Saroyan pictured here in 1940

"The Armenian and the Armenian" is a short story written by William Saroyan in August 1935 in New York. It was first published in 1936 in the collection of short stories entitled Inhale & Exhale. Over the years, the story has become known for the excerpt—"arguably [Saroyan's] most famous saying"—about the survival of the Armenian people after the genocide of 1915.

== Background ==
William Saroyan was born in Fresno, California, to Armenian immigrant parents from Western (historical) Armenia. The Armenian community in Fresno—already significant by the 1910s—grew larger by the influx of genocide survivors and Saroyan grew up in an Armenian environment. In his 1935 story "First Visit to Armenia", Saroyan wrote that he "began to visit Armenia as soon as I had earned the necessary money."

== Overview ==
In the story, Saroyan tells about his encounter with an Armenian waiter he accidentally meets at a beer parlor in the Russian city of Rostov in 1935, en route to Soviet Armenia. The two Armenians, although from different parts of the world, speak Armenian with each other. This fact inspired him to write the story. In a personal note for the second edition (1943) of Inhale & Exhale, Saroyan calls "The Armenian and the Armenian" his favorite of the 31 selected stories.

== The excerpt ==
"The Armenian and the Armenian" is best known for its last two paragraphs, in which Saroyan "unleashes emotional energy and praises the Armenians' ability to survive as a nation". The original text reads as follows:

I should like to see any power of the world destroy this race, this small tribe of unimportant people, whose history is ended, whose wars have all been fought and lost, whose structures have crumbled, whose literature is unread, whose music is unheard, whose prayers are no longer uttered.

Go ahead, destroy this race. Let us say that it is again 1915. There is war in the world. Destroy Armenia. See if you can do it. Send them from their homes into the desert. Let them have neither bread nor water. Burn their houses and their churches. See if they will not live again. See if they will not laugh again. See if the race will not live again when two of them meet in a beer parlor, twenty years later, and laugh, and speak in their tongue. Go ahead, see if you can do anything about it. See if you can stop them from mocking the big ideas of the world, you sons of bitches, a couple of Armenians talking in the world, go ahead and try to destroy them.

The quote is often modified; commonly, the phrase "see if they will not create a New Armenia" is added at the end. It remains unclear under what circumstances it was added. In 2020 the William Saroyan House Museum noted that Saroyan never said those words and the misquotation originated from a 1982 poster and asked to quote the "original, powerful Saroyanesque paragraph."

== Significance and usage ==
Over the years, this excerpt has become of symbolic significance in the Armenian diaspora, which was formed, primarily, as a result of the genocide. Various authors, including English travel writer Philip Marsden, Israeli writer Yoram Kaniuk, American playwright David Mamet, Iranian-born Armenian-American academic Vartan Gregorian, French military writer Gérard Chaliand, Armenian-American criminal defense lawyer Mark Geragos, Armenian-American journalist Stephen Kurkjian, and others have quoted it in their works.

In 2008, California state senators Dave Cogdill and Joe Simitian, along with California assemblymen Greg Aghazarian, Juan Arambula, Paul Krekorian, and Michael Villines proposed a bill which "would designate the year 2008 as the William Saroyan Year". In the statement, "The Armenian and the Armenian" was described as "an especially stirring declaration of solidarity... The words evoke notes of grief, rage, resilience, and rebirth, in relation to Armenian cultural and social life."

== In film ==
The story was adapted into a short film by Armen Karaoghlanian in 2010.

The quote appeared at the end of the 2016 film The Promise, a film about the Armenian Genocide.

== See also ==
- Armenian genocide in culture
