= The Dust Factory =

- Theatrical release poster
- Directed by: Eric Small
- Written by: Eric Small
- Produced by: Tani Cohen; Eric Small
- Starring: Armin Mueller-Stahl; Hayden Panettiere; Ryan Kelley; Kim Myers; George De La Peña; Michael Angarano; Peter Horton
- Cinematography: Stephen M. Katz
- Edited by: Glenn Farr
- Music by: Luis Bacalov
- Production company: Bahr Productions Inc.
- Distributed by: Metro-Goldwyn-Mayer
- Release date: October 15, 2004
- Running time: 99 minutes
- Country: United States
- Language: English

The Dust Factory is a 2004 film directed and written by Eric Small.

== Plot ==
Ryan Flynn is a young boy who, traumatized by the death of his father, has not spoken aloud or exercised his imagination since. While on a walk with a friend, Ryan falls from a bridge and apparently drowns. He finds himself in a parallel universe called the Dust Factory, which houses all humans who are on the verge of death, but have yet to die. The Dust Factory's topography is immense, encompassing lakes, forests, mountains, and a wide field covered by dry grass. In the center of the Dust Factory is a circus pavilion whose Ringmaster is a figure of some authority and dread. Each person dwelling in the Dust Factory must enter the circus pavilion and make a leap (a literal leap of faith) across the arena into the arms of a trapeze artist to proceed into death or return to life. The latter decision occurs when a participant falls into the arena during the leap, leaving behind a pile of dust which marks the passage, gives the realm its name, and when disturbed allows the one doing so to enter a hidden chamber where they play a game of the individual's choosing against the Ringmaster. In the Factory, Ryan regains his voice and is reunited with his grandfather, whose alzheimer's disease has (in his real life) prevented him from communicating with his family. The grandfather, who is apparently knowledgeable about the inner workings of the Dust Factory, advises and tells him stories. The stories he tells, which outwardly appear to convey no obvious meaning, contain hidden parables that Ryan must solve. The theme of belief and hope versus cynicism or despair surfaces in relation to one of these.

Throughout the main body of the plot, Ryan spends a single endless day exploring the Dust Factory under weather conditions that are always favorable to wandering through the environments and marveling at natural beauty. He is guided by his grandfather and accompanied by a girl of his own age called Melanie Lewis, who has been in the Dust Factory for years, lacks any memory of her previous life, and lives under the illusion that the climate is of perpetual winter, despite the appearance to Ryan and the viewer of interminable summer. Melanie and Ryan, under the eye of Ryan's grandfather, become intimate friends. Their time is passed in an emotional atmosphere of joy and discovery, mitigated only by the influence of the mysterious Ringmaster, who interferes several times with their activity, and by Melanie's conflict with Ryan's grandfather, who wishes Ryan to make the leap across the arena and thereby contradicts Melanie's desire that all things remain as they are forever. Matters gradually reach a climax, after which Ryan's grandfather makes the leap and dies. Subsequently, against Melanie's wishes (who does not want to be left alone in the Dust Factory), Ryan makes the leap himself, but falls into the pile of dust and is sent back to life. Melanie then defies her own delusion of continual winter and makes the decision to determine her own fate.

Having returned to life, Ryan resurfaces from beneath the water and is rescued by his friend. Although he no longer has any conscious memory of the Dust Factory, it seems to be present in his subconscious, as implied by the facts that he has regained his voice, and a general feeling of joy in life. He subsequently encounters Melanie, who in real life has recovered from a cerebral aneurysm. Although neither Ryan or Melanie has any conscious memory of the other, they appear to subconsciously recognize each other.

== Cast ==
- Armin Mueller-Stahl as Grandpa Randolph
- Hayden Panettiere as Melanie Lewis
- Ryan Kelley as Ryan Flynn
- Kim Myers as Angie Flynn
- George De La Peña as Ringmaster
- Michael Angarano as Rocky Mazzelli
- Peter Horton as Lionel

== Reception ==
The film has a 9% rating on Rotten Tomatoes.

== Syndication ==
It currently airs on The 3 on Epix and has also aired on MGM HD.
