= Orphans of the Genocide =

2013 television film by Bared Maronian

- Orphans of the Genocide movie poster
- Written by: Bared Maronian; Jacky Abramian
- Directed by: Bared Maronian
- Country of origin: United States

Production
- Cinematography: Armenoid Productions
- Running time: 90 minutes

Original release
- Release: April 2013

Orphans of the Genocide (Armenian: Ցեղասպանության որբերը), is a 2013 television documentary film written and directed by American-Armenian filmmaker Bared Maronian. It premiered in 2015 at the 100th anniversary of the Armenian genocide. The individuals featured in the film are the descendants of the genocide survivors. Maronian was inspired to make the film in 2010 after reading Robert Fisk's article "Living Proof of the Armenian Genocide" in The Independent. The film was made in 3.5 years and was nominated for two Emmy Awards.

== Plot ==
In the documentary an Armenian orphanage located at Antoura, Beirut, Lebanon was unveiled, where thousands of Armenian genocide orphans had lived and were forcefully "Turkified" during World War I. Interviews of software engineer and historian Maurice Kelechian, Almast Boghossian, Jack Kevorkian, British journalist Robert Fisk, and Debórah Dwork are included in the film.

Almast Poghosyan, 105, tells the story of how she was orphaned, how she walked to Deir Ezzor, then ended up with an Arab family, then in an orphanage in Aleppo, and finally settled in the United States. Almast’s story is continued by her grandson, Bruce Poghosyan (President of the American University of Armenia, 2010-2014). The film also uses archival photographs and documents from the Rockefeller Center, the National Archives of Germany and Denmark, the Library of Congress, the U.S. National Archives, the Armenian Genocide Museum-Institute, and other institutions.

== Author's remarks ==
"The stories of the Armenian genocide orphans that we highlight in the documentary are of universal proportions. Meaning, the experiences that the orphans of the Armenian genocide went through are the same experiences (loss of family members, starvation, pain, epidemics such as typhus, social displacement) that the orphans of the Cambodian genocide, the Holocaust orphans, and the Darfur genocide orphans went through. Therefore, the Armenian genocide is not only an Armenian issue. It concerns all of the civilized world. A large number of scholars agree that, had the world paid closer attention to the Armenian genocide – the first genocide of the 20th century – the genocides that followed it would have never happened." — Bared Maronian.

== Reception ==
Orphans of Genocide was shown on PBS and has been viewed by over 12 million people. The film was nominated by the National Academy of Television Arts and Sciences in the 2014 Suncoast Emmy Awards in the Documentary-Historical category.

== See also ==
- Armenian genocide
- Armenian genocide in culture
- Vorpahavak (Armenian: Վորպահավակ; lit. 'gathering of orphans')
