= Screamers (2006 film) =

American documentary film by Carla Garapedian

- Film poster
- Directed by: Carla Garapedian
- Produced by: Peter McAlevey
- Starring: Serj Tankian; Daron Malakian; Shavo Odadjian; John Dolmayan
- Cinematography: Charles Rose
- Edited by: William Yarhaus
- Music by: Jeff Atmajian; System of a Down
- Distributed by: Maya Releasing
- Release date: December 8, 2006
- Running time: 89 minutes
- Country: United States
- Languages: English; Armenian

Screamers is a 2006 documentary film directed by Carla Garapedian, conceived by Peter McAlevey and Garapedian and produced by McAlevey. The film explores why genocides have occurred in modern day history and features talks from Serj Tankian, lead vocalist of the American alternative metal band System of a Down, whose grandfather is an Armenian genocide survivor, as well as from human-rights activist, journalist, and professor, Samantha Power, as well as various other people involved with genocides in Rwanda and Darfur. Screamers also examines genocide denial in current-day Turkey, and the neutral trend that the United States generally holds towards genocide.

Screamers is now shown in Armenian Youth organizations to explain and clarify the Armenian genocide, and raise awareness. Also, it is used to educate Armenians and others about the genocide.

== Contributors ==
(in order of appearance)

- Samantha Power, Professor, Harvard University, Pulitzer prize-winning author, A Problem from Hell: America and the Age of Genocide
- Serj Tankian, Vocalist, System of a Down
- John Dolmayan, Drummer, System of a Down
- Daron Malakian, Guitarist, System of a Down
- Shavo Odadjian, Bassist, System of a Down
- Aram Hamparian, Armenian National Committee
- Stepan Haytayan, Grandfather of Serj Tankian, 96-year-old survivor of Armenian genocide
- Maritza Ohanesian, 100-year-old survivor of Armenian genocide
- Guy Simonian, Community Activist
- Michael Hagopian, Filmmaker, "Voices from the Lake", "Germany and the Secret Genocide", "The Forgotten Genocide"
- Verjin Mempreian, 96-year old survivor of Armenian genocide
- Greg Topalian, Freeman College, UK
- Henry Morgenthau III, Grandson of Henry Morgenthau, Sr., U.S. Ambassador to the Ottoman empire
- Lord Shannon, House of Lords
- Lord Avebury, House of Lords
- Baroness Cox, Deputy Speaker, House of Lords
- Charles Tannock, MEP, Conservative, European Parliament
- Tom Tsvann, Professor, Center for Holocaust and Genocide Studies Amsterdam
- Peter Galbraith, Former U.S. Senate Staff
- Vartkes Yeghiayan, "The Case of Soghomon Tehlirian" Author
- Sibel Edmonds, Former FBI translator
- Taner Akçam, Turkish historian and dissident
- Hrant Dink, Agos Newspaper, Istanbul. Assassinated by a Turkish nationalist shortly after the premiere of Screamers, in which he was interviewed about Turkish denial of the Armenian genocide.
- Appo Jabarian, Editor, USA Armenian Life Speaking at UCLA conference
- Ara Sarafian, Gomidas Institute
- Adam Schiff, U.S. Congressman
- Salih Booker, Africa Action

== Response ==
=== Critical reaction ===
Screamers received mixed to positive reviews from critics. On the review aggregator website Rotten Tomatoes, 66% of 32 critics' reviews are positive, with an average rating of 6.2/10. The website's consensus reads: "A raw and urgent snapshot of a band and the politics that drive it." Metacritic, which uses a weighted average, assigned the film a score of 55 out of 100, based on 15 critics, indicating "mixed or average" reviews. Ken Hachikian, chairman of the Armenian National Committee of America, described the documentary as a "powerful contribution to the anti-genocide movement."

=== Awards ===
- In 2006, Screamers won the AFI Audience Award for Best Documentary.
