= Artin Poturlyan =

- Артин Потурлян
- Born: May 4, 1943 (age 83); Harmanli, Bulgaria
- Education: State Academy of Music, Sofia
- Occupation: Composer
- Notable work: See list of works
- Style: Contemporary classical

Artin Poturlyan or Potourlian (Bulgarian: Артин Потурлян [ɐrˈtin potorˈʎan]; born May 4, 1943) is an Armenian-Bulgarian composer and pedagogue.

== Education ==
He graduated from the State Academy of Music, Sofia in 1967 with a speciality in Musical Pedagogy and studied composition under Professor Pencho Stoyanov and Professor Pancho Vladigerov. From 1969 to 1974 Poturlyan studied composition at the Komitas State Conservatory in Yerevan, Armenia under Professor Lazar Sarian.

== Career ==
He worked as a music editor at Bulgarian National Television from 1967 to 1969 and as a lecturer at the National Music School "Lyubomir Pipkov" in Sofia from 1974 to 1977. Since 1990 he has been teaching polyphony at the Pancho Vladigerov State Academy of Music; in 2005 he was promoted professor.

His works have been performed in Armenia, Russia, Georgia, Austria, France, Germany, Slovakia, and Italy. Bulgarian music festival appearances include New Bulgarian Music, Varna Summer Festival, Musica Nova, Holland-Bulgarian Music Festival, and the Festival of American and Bulgarian Music.

== Awards ==
He was awarded the prize of Union of Bulgarian Composers in 1983 and 1989. In 1985 he won first prize at the Winter Music Evenings Competition in Pazardzhik.

== Works ==
- "Sonata for Violin and Piano №1" (1972)
- Symphony №1 (1973)
- "Two Sonnets" for mixed chorus after poems by Pablo Neruda (1975)
- Symphony №2 (1977)
- "Music for Three Flutes, Two Grand Pianos, Tam-tam and Strings" (1978)
- The Cry, one act opera, after Ray Bradbury (1979)
- Chamber Concerto for piano and strings (1980)
- "Poem" for organ, symphony orchestra and tape (1980)
- Violin Concerto (1983)
- "Music in Memory of Evariste Galois" (1984)
- "Ballad for Levski" for two mixed chorus after poems by Hristo Bankovski (1987)
- "Mosaics" (1988)
- Piano Quintet (1989)
- "Fantasy" for piano and symphony orchestra (1990)
- "Improvisations for Clarinet and Piano" (1992)
- String Quartet (1993)
- "Divertimento" for wind quintet, harp, harpsichord and percussion (1994)
- "Three Songs after Armenian Poets" 1, 2 Daniel Varuzhan; 3 Vahakn Davtian; for soprano and piano (1994)
- "Whispering Alone", lyrics by Peyo Yavorov; for soprano and piano (1994)
- Piano Trio (1995)
- "The Infinite" for mezzo-soprano, baritone, mixed chorus and symphony orchestra; lyrics by Giacomo Leopardi (1998)
- Cello Concerto (1999)
- "Russian Romances" for soprano and piano, lyrics by Valery Bryusov, Konstantin Bal'mont, Avetik Isahakian, Vahan Terian, Alexander Blok (2000)
- "Three Songs" after poems by Radoy Ralin (2000)
- "A Handful of Ash from Your Ashes" for harp (2000)
- Concerto Grosso for harpsichord and strings (2000)
- Piano Quartet (2001)
- "A Rose for Emily" for cello and piano (2001)
- "A Sojourn of the Spirit" for soprano, flute, violoncello, piano and tape after poems by John Gracen Brown (2001)
- "Elegia" (2002)
- "Voices and Steps" for solo cello (2002)
- "Rain" for mixed chorus after poems by Atanas Dalchev (2002)
- "Melomonologos" for solo viola (2003)
- "Prelude, Allegro and Largo" for two violins (2003)
- "Epigraphe, Epistrophes, Epilogue" for violin and viola (2004)
- "Monumentum" (2005)
- "Sphynx" for string trio (2005)
- "Prelude and Fugue" for flute, clarinet and bassoon (2005)
- "Evening for Mixed Chorus and Organ in Memory of Radoy Ralin" after poems by Atanas Dalchev (2005)
- "Bagatelles" (2006)
- "Sonata for Violin and Piano №2" (2006)
- "Sonata for Cello and Piano" (2007)
- "Epitaphios in Memory of Lazar Nikolov" for piano trio (2007)

=== For two pianos ===
- Fantasy "Wanderer" (1983)
- Fantasy "Worlds" (1985)

=== For piano ===
- "Sonatina" (1970)
- Segments (1979)
- "Spirals" (1980)
- "Arabesques" (1982)
- "Confessions" (1986)
- "Anagram Labyrinth" (1996)
- "The Temple of Kaissa I" (1998)
- "The Temple of Kaissa II" (2000)

=== For organ ===
- "Sonata" (1972)
- "Four Spiritual Songs on Themes by Nerses Shnorhali" (1988)

== Bibliography ==
- Lazar Nikolov (1983)
- A Place under the Sun (1989)
- Metrorythmic-Tempo Modulation (1992)
- Geometric Transformations of the Plane and the Spase and Invention Polyphony (1999)
- Reflexive Counterpoint (2004)
- Theoretic Problems in the Canon Cancrizans from Musikalisches Opfer by Johann Sebastian Bach (2005)
