= Ravished Armenia =

1918 book by Aurora Mardiganian

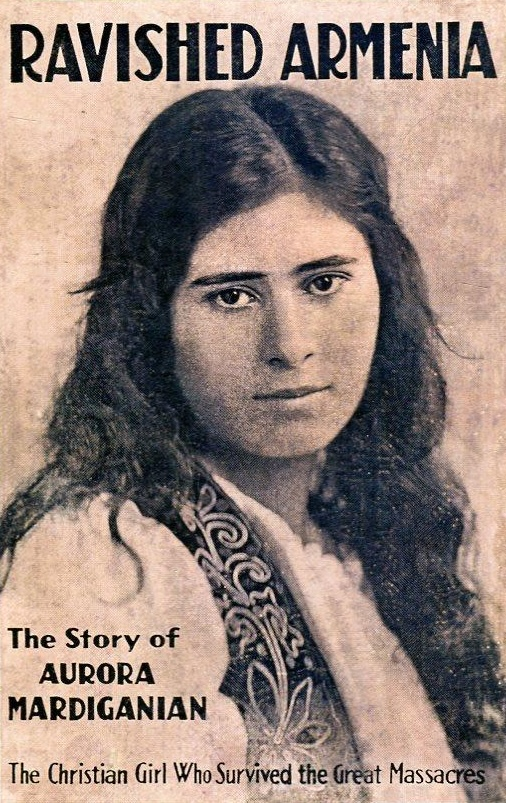
- Cover of the book Ravished Armenia
- Author: Arshaluys (Aurora) Mardiganian
- Language: English
- Genre: Autobiography
- Publication date: 1918
- Publication place: United States
- Media type: Hardcover
- Text: Ravished Armenia online

Ravished Armenia (full title: Ravished Armenia: The Story of Aurora Mardiganian, the Christian Girl, Who Survived the Great Massacres) is a book written in 1918 by Arshaluys (Aurora) Mardiganian about her experiences in the Armenian genocide.

A Hollywood film based on it was filmed in 1919 under the title Auction of Souls (which also became known as Ravished Armenia, based on the book from which it was adapted). Only a fragment of the film remains, but Mardiganian's account is still in print. An animated film, Aurora's Sunrise, is also based on the book.

== Plot ==
The author Arshaluys (Aurora) Mardiganian was born in the city of Çemişgezek, near Harput (Kharpert), (present-day Turkish province of Elâzığ), Ottoman Empire. She was the daughter of a wealthy Armenian financier in the city. The story starts in 1915 when Arshaluys was 14 years old. She personally witnessed the murder of her father, mother, brothers and sisters. She was taken to the harem of a number of Turkish pashas, but had remained attached to her Christian Armenian faith despite being tortured repeatedly at the hands of her captors.

She found refuge with Frederick W. MacCallum, a Canadian doctor and missionary stationed with the American Board of Commissioners for Foreign Missions (ABCFM), who safely returned her to Erzurum, which had come under Russian control. She later moved to Tbilisi (Tiflis) in the Caucasus and, through the mediation of General Andranik Ozanian and orders of the Russian military leadership in the Caucasus, was sent to the United States for recovery and to inform Americans the sufferings of the Armenians in the Ottoman Empire.

In the book, she recalled sixteen young Armenian girls being "crucified" by their Ottoman tormentors. The film Auction of Souls (1919) showed the victims nailed to crosses. However, almost 70 years later Mardiganian revealed to film historian Anthony Slide that the scene was inaccurate, and the girls were actually raped and impaled. She stated that "The Turks didn't make their crosses like that. The Turks made little pointed crosses. They took the clothes off the girls. They made them bend down, and after raping them, they made them sit on the pointed wood, through the vagina. That's the way they killed – the Turks. Americans have made it a more civilized way. They can't show such terrible things."

The book was written by journalist Henry Leyford Gates, whose novelist-wife Eleanor Brown Gates became Mardiganian's legal guardian in America.

== See also ==
- Henry Morgenthau, Sr.
- The Forty Days of Musa Dagh
