= Ils sont tombés =

Song written by Charles Aznavour and Georges Garvarentz in 1976

"Ils sont tombés" is a song released in 1976, written by Charles Aznavour and Georges Garvarentz in 1975, and dedicated to the memory of Armenian genocide victims. It was subsequently released in English, as They Fell. The text has also been translated into Russian and Armenian (performed by Mirta Satdjian). The authorized Armenian translation is made by Fr. Raphael Antonian, Director of Murad-Rafaelian College in Sevres.
