= Carla Garapedian =

Armenian-American documentary filmmaker

- Քարլա Կարապետեան
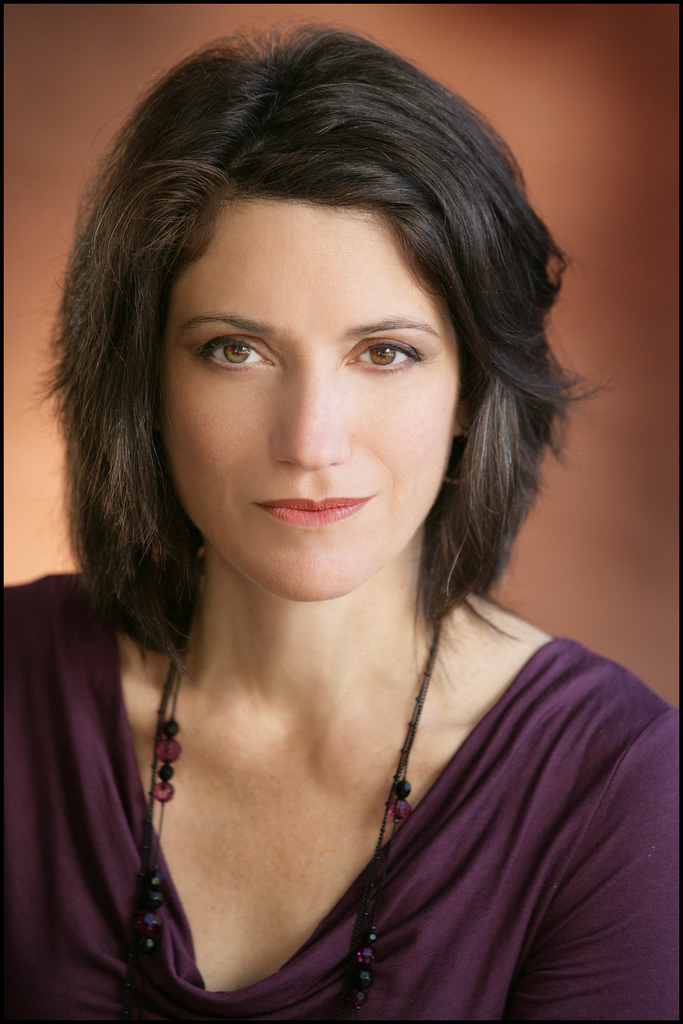
- Portrait of Garapedian
- Born: 27 February 1961 (age 65); Los Angeles, California, U.S
- Occupations: filmmaker and former anchor for BBC World News

Carla Garapedian (Armenian: Քարլա Կարապետեան; born 27 February 1961) is a filmmaker, director, writer and broadcaster. She directed Children of the Secret State about North Korea and was an anchor for BBC World News. After leaving BBC World, she directed Dying for the President about Chechnya, Lifting the Veil, about women in Afghanistan, Iran Undercover (Forbidden Iran for PBS Frontline World) and My Friend the Mercenary about the coup in Equatorial Guinea. Her feature, Screamers, was theatrically released in the U.S. in December 2006 and early 2007, and was on Newsweek's pick of non-fiction films for 2006/7. The Independent called it "powerful" and Larry King for CNN described it as "a brilliant film. Everyone should see it." The New York Times deemed it "invigorating and articulate," while the Los Angeles Times called it "eye-opening." "Carla Garapedian is a screamer, too," said the Washington Post.

== Early career ==
She earned her undergraduate and Ph.D. degrees in international relations at the London School of Economics and Political Science before working as a producer, director and foreign correspondent based in Britain. Between 1987 and 1990, she was a producer/director and reporter for over 75 editions of The World This Week (Channel 4, UK). Her first documentary, Cooking the Books (1989, Channel 4 Dispatches), was a controversial investigation of the Thatcher government's alleged manipulation of official statistics. Between 1991 and 1992 she went in front of the camera, to become the London correspondent for NBC London Live, producing twice-weekly live spots for NBC Newschannel and NBC affiliate, KCRA. From 1991, she also worked for the BBC, producing and directed documentaries for the BBC's long-form foreign affairs documentary series, Assignment. Films included Europe's Nuclear Nightmare (1991), an investigation of East Europe's most dangerous nuclear reactors, post-Chernobyl; A Short Break in the Interference (1993), with Donald Woods, examining radical changes in South African broadcasting; and Aliens Go Home (1994) unraveling the immigration backlash in California following the 1994 earthquake. She was CNBC's London anchor and correspondent in 1995-1996, and in the same period reported for NBC Weekend Nightly News and NBC Today News.

== BBC World ==
The first American to anchor BBC World News, Garapedian presented news and analysis for the main news programs and bulletins between 1996 and 1998. In her later screenplay, Talkback, she dramatizes the night Princess Diana died. Her experiences are also humorously recalled in a 2002 Los Angeles Times article.

== Dispatches, Channel 4 (UK) ==
With the advent of smaller digital cameras, Garapedian began making documentaries in areas usually out of reach to journalists. Working with Hardcash production company, she produced and directed films for Channel 4's investigative series, Dispatches. Her films, all using undercover filming, included Dying for the President (Chechnya), Children of the Secret State (North Korea), Lifting the Veil (Afghanistan), Iran Undercover (Iran) and My Friend the Mercenary (South Africa/Equatorial Guinea). A description of this work is partly described in The Los Angeles Times article, "Documenting Truth in Dangerous Places."

== Lifting the Veil ==
Lifting the Veil is a 50-minute documentary that was funded by Channel Four in the UK. The filmmaker traveled to Afghanistan to investigate the public murder of Zarmina, an Islamic mother of seven. Her abusive husband was going to tell the Taliban that she had committed adultery, a crime punishable by death. She killed him in self-defense and was sent to prison. Her seven children, all under the age of 15, were persuaded by the Taliban to find their mother guilty. Garapedian searched out the children, who provide commentary. Lifting the Veil was originally broadcast on British television in 2002, and later broadcast on the U.S. Sundance Channel.

== Screamers ==
Screamers was a documentary feature film released in December 2006. This film features the band System of a Down and depicts genocides of the past century, with a focus on the Armenian genocide of 1915-1923. Also mentioned are the Jewish Holocaust, the Bosnian Genocide, the Rwandan genocide, and the genocide of the Darfur region. The movie examines the problem of why genocides repeat, with contributions from Pulitzer prize-winning author Professor Samantha Power (A Problem from Hell: America and the Age of Genocide), who, from 2013 to 2017, was the U.S. Ambassador to the United Nations. The film consists of a tour with System of a Down interspersed with various scenes of genocides in the twentieth century. The film premiered at the AFI Film festival in November 2006, where it shared the Audience Award for Best Documentary. After the film's release, one of the contributors in the film, Hrant Dink, an editor for Agos Newspaper, was murdered in Istanbul, Turkey. In addition to its theatrical release in the United States, Screamers has been translated into 13 languages and shown in political venues like the U.S. Congress, British Parliament, European Parliament, Canadian Parliament and United Nations (UNHCR). The film was officially selected for festivals around the world, including the Warsaw International Film Festival, Hamburg International Film Festival, São Paulo Mostra International Film Festival, Reykjavik Film Festival, Montreal Human Rights festival, Amnesty International Film Festival in Vancouver, Flanders International Film Festival, MOFFAM festival in Prague, Encounters festival in Johannesburg and Cape Town, and the Golden Apricot International Film Festival in Yerevan. On April 24, 2007, when Screamers was screened in the British Parliament, the Chairman of the Genocide Prevention Committee, John Bercow MP (current Speaker of the House), made the following statement: "Timed to coincide with the 92nd anniversary of the horrific Armenian genocide, this harrowing film is the most powerful reminder that the evil of genocide is sadly not a thing of the past but has remained a recurrent feature in our world to the present day, from Armenia to the Holocaust, from Srebreniça to Rwanda, and now to Darfur. Bestial slaughter of whole peoples continues to blight humanity, shaming and diminishing us all. By pitching the film to young people who often will know nothing of earlier horrors, Carla is encouraging a new generation to treat the business of murder as their business to stop, through campaigning, protest and pressure." In 2015, Screamers screened in Berlin, Minsk, and Moscow for the 100th commemoration of the Armenian Genocide. It was also shown in Turkey for the first time, sponsored by the Documentarist film festival, which features banned and censored films.

== Weimar-era Feature Film ==
At the 2008 Hamburg International Film Festival, Garapedian was asked by a member of the audience about the lessons Germany may have learned from the Armenian genocide. She replied that she was fascinated with the inter-war period of German politics and, in particular, with a murder trial that occurred in Berlin in 1921. This trial was touched on by Samantha Power in Screamers, referring to "A Crime with No Name," the first chapter of Power's book, A Problem from Hell: America and the Age of Genocide. Garapedian said that she believed this trial foreshadowed the Holocaust. She confirmed in October 2015, during her discussion at the Hammer Museum with Eric Bogosian, author of Operation Nemesis, that she is making a feature film about the trial which has been the subject of a number of books.

== Awards ==
Garapedian has received numerous awards for her piercing documentaries. Her first documentary, "Cooking the Books" for Dispatches (Channel 4, UK, 1989), was nominated for a Royal Television Society award. She is the recipient of the Armin T. Wegner Humanitarian Award (Armin T. Wegner Society), and the Clara Barton Medal (National Academy of Sciences, Armenian Genocide Museum Institute). Germany and the Secret Genocide, a film she co-wrote with J. Michael Hagopian, won the Gold Camera for History in the U.S. International Film and Video Festival in 2004. In 2006 "Screamers," co-created and co-produced with Peter McAlevey, shared the American Film Institute Audience Award for Best Documentary. It won the Audience award at the Montreal Human Rights festival, and the Golden Apricot and Ecumenical Jury Award in Yerevan in 2007. On February 27, 2009, AGBU honored Garapedian with GenNext's "Community Hero award." Garapedian accepted the award for her film Screamers, the critically acclaimed documentary about System of a Down's efforts to raise Armenian genocide awareness in the minds of mainstream audiences. During her acceptance speech, Garapedian said:

There is always that one person, that angel, that mentor, who is there for you at that crucial juncture of your life. I know how important it is to have a mentorship program. It really mattered to me to have a mentor and I know it matters to our young people.""

After Screamers, she started to speak about genocide prevention and human rights to university audiences. At the Claremont McKenna Atheneum series, in 2013, she spoke about "Truth, Denial and the Armenian Genocide. She was the keynote speaker at the 2010 official commemoration of the Armenian genocide at the Massachusetts State Parliament, and the moderator of the I am Armenian film series at the Hammer Museum in 2015. Carla Garapedian is one of the individuals recognized in 100 Lives an initiative that aims to "show gratitude through action." On April 24, 2016, along with George Clooney, the organization will launch the Aurora Prize, supporting humanitarian projects around the world.

== Armenian Film Foundation ==
Leo Garapedian, her father, was a journalism professor and co-founder of the Armenian Film Foundation. This organization supported the late filmmaker, J. Michael Hagopian, and his 40-year quest to record, on 16mm film, Armenian Genocide survivors around the world. Carla Garapedian narrated Hagopian's film, Voices from the Lake, and The River Ran Red, as well as co-writing Hagopian's film, Germany and the Secret Genocide. After Hagopian's death, she became the project leader of the Armenian Film Foundation's Armenian Genocide Testimonies collection, which digitized approximately 400 interviews of Armenian genocide survivors (filmed by J. Michael Hagopian) for the USC Shoah Foundation's Visual History Archive. The Shoah Foundation, founded by filmmaker Steven Spielberg, created the Visual History Archive, to make available 52,000 Holocaust testimonies for research and education. The Visual History Archive has now added testimonies from other genocides, including the Armenian Genocide. Garapedian continues to work with the Armenian Film Foundation, one of the preeminent centers for visual images of Armenian history and culture.

== Pomegranate Foundation ==
She founded the Pomegranate Foundation in 2009 to raise awareness, through the arts, about genocide and intolerance. A rare library of Rwanda genocide survivor testimonies, filmed by Professor Donald E. Miller and Lorna Tourian Miller, was added to the foundation's collection in 2015.

== See also ==
- Screamers (documentary)
- Forbidden Iran
