= Harutiun Dellalian =

Armenian composer (1937–1990)

Harutiun Dellalian (August 8, 1937 in Athens – April 23, 1990) was a contemporary Armenian composer. At his first appearance in United States (in 1987) he won the Superstar Prize and Golden Award of the California Cinema and Television Board.

== Biography ==
He studied at Armenian primary school of Athens, then moved to Armenia with his family. He entered Romanos Melikian College of Music (the classes of Edvard Mirzoyan) in 1968 when he was 31. In 1972 he was admitted to the Yerevan State Conservatory. In 1979 he became a member of the Composers' Union of Armenia.

His works were performed on many stages throughout the world, in the US, Japan, Italy, England, Portugal, Spain, France, Germany, Greece, Russia and Armenia.

He is the author of 25 works (a number of which are incomplete).

== Works ==
- Symphonic Poem Death,
- Memorial to the Martyrs Requiem Cantata,
- Immersed Sun Dramatic Cantata,
- Ecloga Chamber concert for string orchestra and flute,
- Topophono chamber concert for string orchestra, piano and French horn,
- Meditations for clarinet and piano,
- Sonata for piano,
- Requiem Trionfale for organ, etc.
