= Don Askarian =

Armenian filmmaker (1949–2018)

Don Askarian (Armenian: Դոն Ասկարյան; born Makedon Hovsepi Askarian, Armenian: Մակեդոն Հովսեփի Ասկարյան; 10 July 1949 – 6 October 2018) was an Armenian film director, producer, photographer and screenwriter.

== Biography ==
Don Askarian was born in Stepanakert in the Nagorno-Karabakh Autonomous Oblast, Soviet Union. In 1967, he moved to Moscow and studied history and art, and worked as an assistant director and film critic for a year after his graduation. Askarian was imprisoned during 1975–1977, and in 1978 he emigrated from the Soviet Union to West Berlin. He lived and worked in Germany, the Netherlands and in Armenia, where he founded his own film companies. He was awarded numerous prizes at several international film festivals.

His films were co-produced and broadcast by ARD, WDR, ZDF, Channel 4, Arte, as well as Belgian, Greek, Swiss, Slovak, Armenian TV Channels.

In 1996, Askarian published a book called The Dangerous Light. In 2002 he was honored with a Harvard Film Archive retrospective and two years later, in 2004, received the Golden Camera Award for Life Achievement at Int. ART Film Festival, Slovakia. Askarian's brother is sculptor and painter Robert Askarian.

Askarian died on 6 October 2018 in Berlin.

== Filmography ==
Sources:

- 1984: The Bear
- 1988: Nagorno Karabakh: Armenian History Volumes IV and V (Լեռնային Ղարաբաղ)
- 1988: Komitas (Կոմիտաս)
- 1992: Avetik (Ավետիք)
- 1998: Paradjanov (Փարաջանով)
- 2000: Musicians (Երաժիշտները)
- 2001: On the Old Roman Road (Հին հռոմեական ճանապարհին)
- 2007: Ararat: 14 Views (Արարատ. 14 տեսանկյուն)
- 2008: Father (Հայրիկ)
