= Aurora's Sunrise =

- Film poster
- Directed by: Inna Sahakyan
- Written by: Peter Liakhov; Kerstin Meyer-Beetz; Inna Sahakyan
- Produced by: Arevik Avanesyan; Christian Beetz; Kestutis Drazdauskas; Eric Esrailian; Angela Frangyan; Nvard Ghazaryan; Vardan Hovhannisyan; Kathrin Isberner; Sona Margaryan; Juste Michailinaite; Yelizaveta Petrosyan; Khane Poghosyan; Inna Sahakyan; Astghik Sayadyan; Anna Ter-Gabrielyan; Anna Zakaryan
- Cinematography: Vardan Brutyan
- Edited by: Ruben Ghazaryan
- Music by: Christine Aufderhaar
- Production companies: Bars Media; Broom Films; Gebrueder Beetz Filmproduktion
- Release date: June 16, 2022 (Annecy)
- Running time: 96 minutes
- Countries: Armenia; Germany; Lithuania
- Languages: Armenian; English; Turkish; Kurdish; German

Aurora's Sunrise (Armenian: Արշալույսի լուսաբացը, romanized: Arshaluysi lusabats’y) is a 2022 adult animated documentary film directed by Inna Sahakyan. It is based on the life of Aurora Mardiganian, an Armenian Genocide survivor who after her escape became an actress in the United States. The film includes short scenes of the film Auction of Souls, a silent film from 1919 on the Armenian Genocide, in which Aurora Mardiganian had the leading role.

== Synopsis ==
The film is primarily animated, intercut with the remaining footage of Auction of Souls, an interview with Mardiganian, and other historical footage.

Arshaluys Mardiganian is born into a wealthy Armenian family in Eastern Anatolia in the Ottoman Empire. Their neighbor, a Kurdish shepherd, warns them of Armenians rounded up and killed by the Ottomans, but her father refuses to leave, but then he and her brother are drafted to fight in World War I. Soon after, her family, along with thousands of other Armenians, are forced onto a death march across the Syrian desert, in which her mother and siblings all perish. Mardiganian is sold into sexual slavery, but she flees by diving into a river. She witnesses the family of her two-year-old cousin killed, and she escapes with the baby and they are taken in by a kind Kurdish family. She leaves the baby with the family, believing that he will be safer with them. She finds shelter at a monastery, which is then attacked, and she is captured and sold into a Turkish harem. She flees back home to Armenia and finds her neighbor, the shepherd, who informs her that her uncle is alive, but very ill with malaria, and is hiding in a village in the mountains. Once he recovers, he joins the resistance and leaves Mardiganian in Russian-controlled Erzurum.

With the help of American missionaries, she leaves Armenia for Tbilisi, then St. Petersburg, and then to New York in the United States. Armenian military leader Andranik Ozanian gives her the mission of informing the United States of what is happening to her people; she also hopes to find her brother who lives in the States. She is taken in by journalist Henry Leyford Gates and his novelist wife Eleanor Brown Gates, who becomes her legal guardian. She writes and publishes an autobiography, entitled Ravished Armenia, under the Anglicized name of "Aurora." The book gains the attention of a director who wants to turn it into a film, with Arshaluys in the leading role. The film, Auction of Souls, is made and used to raise funds for American Committee for Armenian and Syrian Relief. She tours the country promoting the film, but repeatedly reliving the trauma of the genocide takes a toll on her well-being, and despite her efforts, she never finds her brother. At a screening in Buffalo, she collapses from exhaustion.

Gates sends her to live at a convent, until she receives a letter from her uncle revealing that her sister Arusyak was found alive in Aleppo, and has arranged to come to the United States. She finds new hope upon learning this, along with seeing the amount of Armenian orphans rescued by the Far East Relief. A ship arrives at the harbor, where Mardiganian awaits her sister.

Text details that Mardiganian later became a wife and mother, and lived in obscurity until her death in 1994. Shortly after, the remaining footage of the once fully lost Auction of Souls was discovered. The Aurora Prize for Awakening Humanity is named in honor of her. Since then, the United States has acknowledged the Armenian genocide while the government of Turkey continues to deny it. The film ends with a dedication to all genocide survivors, and a message to "never forget."

== Production ==
Inna Sahakyan began its development in 2014 but she had no prior experience in making an animated film. Since 2015 the Zoryan Institute supported the realization of the film by signing an agreement with Bars Media. The Zoryan Institute provided interviews with Aurora Mardiganian, recorded before Mardiganian's death. The decision to make an animated documentary from her story, was motivated because animation enabled much more freedom in expression techniques. Armenian colors and symbols were included in the film and the paper cutout CG animation technique was used, where only a few frames per second are animated. The film began to be produced in 2019, but the process was disrupted by the COVID-19 pandemic and then also the conflict between Azerbaijan and Armenia in 2020. At the time of the conflict the production was helped strongly by Lithuanians and the Germans. The film is a co-production of Bars Media from Armenia, Broom Films from Lithuania and the Gebrueder Beetz Filmproduktion from Germany.

== Release ==
The film premiered in June 2022 when it was shown at the Annecy International Animation Festival. It premiered in Yerevan, the capital of Armenia in November. It is Armenia's entry to the Academy Awards for International Feature Film in 2023, becoming the second animated documentary film to be nominated for that section after Flee from Denmark in 2022. Unlike Flee, it was not selected as a nominee for the Academy Award for Best International Feature Film.

On October 23, 2023, the film was broadcast on the American channel PBS through its POV television series.

== Awards and recognition ==
- Audience Award at Animation Is Film, 2022
- Asia Pacific Screen Award, 2022, Australia — Best Animated Feature Film
- Tallinn Black Nights Film Festival, 2022, Estonia – Baltic Competition, Award for the Best Baltic Producer for Co-production
- Golden Apricot Yerevan International Film Festival 2022, Armenia, International Competition – Silver Apricot Winner
- MiradasDoc, 2023, Spain – Best Feature Length Documentary Award Winner
- Movies that Matter Festival, 2023, Netherlands – Audience Award Winner
- 21st International Film Festival and Forum on Human Rights, 2023, Switzerland, — Grand Prix de Geneve Winner
- Europa! Europa Film Festival, 2023, Australia — Audience Choice Award Winner

== Critical response ==
The film received positive reviews from critics. On the review aggregator website Rotten Tomatoes, 100% of 23 critics' reviews are positive. Metacritic, which uses a weighted average, assigned the film a score of 79 out of 100, based on 6 critics, indicating "generally favorable" reviews. Brian Tallerico, managing editor of RogerEbert.com, awarded Aurora's Sunrise three and a half out of four stars, describing the film as 'a stunning hybrid that melds animation, interview footage with its subject, and a 1919 silent film once thought lost to history that’s about her life' and 'a reminder that film doesn't just record history, it can transport us through it.' The film made The New York Times "Critic's Pick" list prior to the start of its limited theatrical run in North America, with critic Teo Bugbee calling Aurora's Sunrise a 'standout documentary.'

== See also ==
- List of submissions to the 95th Academy Awards for Best International Feature Film
- List of Armenian submissions for the Academy Award for Best International Feature Film
