= Mher Khachatryan (painter) =

Armenian-American painter (born 1983)

- Born: November 3, 1983 (age 42); Yerevan, Armenia
- Education: Yerevan at Art school of Hakob Kojoyan; Panos Terlemezyan Art College; Fine Arts in Yerevan, Armenia; Hakob Kogoyan Art School
- Known for: Jesus, 9/11, The Smoke
- Awards: The Two-Dimensional Public Vote Award winner (2018)
- Website: mherkhachatryan.com

Mher Khachatryan (born November 3, 1983) is a New York-based Armenian painter. His artwork has been published in several prestigious magazines and newspapers. His art also has been shown in area galleries across the world and private collections in Armenia, Russia, and the U.S. Mher's work also can be found in Armenian national gallery, the work "My Angel" is dedicated to the 100th anniversary of the Armenian Genocide. He is the founder and CEO of Art To Thank and also a founder of the Cre8 Art School. Mher has won several awards and he is a member of the Artists' Union of Armenia.

== Early life ==
Mher was born on November 3, 1983, in Armenia. His early interest was in drawing. He studied in an art college, and he spent three years in Academy of Fine Arts in Armenia, completing his formal art training, Mher received his BFA in drawing and painting at the Art college of Panos Terlemezyan, and MFA at the Academy Of Fine Arts in Yerevan, Armenia.

== Career ==
He started to show his art in area galleries including Ico Gallery in Chelsea, New York City; Hanna Gallery in New Jersey; Narekatsy gallery in Armenia; Webster Hall in New York City; Vulcan’s Forge in Missouri. Mher is the founder of the Art To Thank, an NGO which donates the painted portraits to the Veterans, wounded warriors and the families of deceased soldiers.

== Awards and achievements ==
2018:

- The Two-Dimensional Public Vote Award winner in ArtPrize

== See also ==
- List of Armenian painters
- Karapet Yeghiazaryan
- Karen Smbatyan
