= Eric Small =

Television and film producer

Eric Small is a television and film producer, writer and director of different movies and the TV Series Penn & Teller: Bullshit! (2003).

== Biography ==
Small's first writing project, Blue Blazes, was awarded the Gold Medal for Best Screenplay at WorldFest-Houston International Film Festival. Small's film credits include Maximum Risk and Rubicon. He is married to American television and film actress Kim Myers. Eric made his directorial debut with the film The Dust Factory which had a small part played by his wife Kim Myers.

== Directing filmography ==
- The Dust Factory (2004)

== Writing filmography ==
- Code Red (2001)
- The Dust Factory (2004)

== Miscellaneous filmography ==
- Illegally Yours (1988) - production assistant to Director Peter Bogdanovich
