= Alexander Brincken =

- Born: 23 December 1952 (age 73)
- Genres: classical
- Occupation: Composer, Pianist and Organist
- Instruments: piano and organ
- Years active: 1970–present

Alexander Brincken (born 23 December 1952 in Leningrad) is a classical composer, pianist and organist. Since 1992 he has resided in Lucerne, Switzerland.

== Biography ==
Graduated from Saint Petersburg Conservatory as composer (class of Prof. Sergei Slonimsky) and musicologist (class of Michail Druskin). Since 1992 Brincken is giving concerts as a composer and pedagogue, mainly in the Switzerland.

Among the works written by Brincken are 5 symphonies, "The Queen of Snow" ballet, "The Song about Armenia" oratorio, a Mass, Sextett for strings, and a number of choral and chamber works.

His Concerto grosso for solo viola and string orchestra (1991-1992) was premiered on 27 September 1998 in Maienfeld, Switzerland in the final concert of the “Kulturherbst Bündner Herrschaft” Music Festival in the Swiss Canton of Graubünden, performed by the Bündner Chamber Orchestra with Jürg Dähler (Zurich, Switzerland) as soloist, conducted by Christoph Cajöri (Switzerland). The Russian Premiere took place in 2003 in the Rakhmaninov Hall of the Moscow Conservatory, performed by “The Seasons” Moscow Chamber Orchestra with Aleksandr Barsukov (Moscow) as soloist, conducted by Vladislav Bulakhov (Moscow).

== Selected discography ==
- Alexander Brincken. Werke für Streicher (Works for Strings), Germany, 2006
- Alexander Brincken. Geistliche Chorwerke (Sacred Choral Works), Germany, 2008
- Alexander Brincken: Orthodoxe Gesänge /Russian Sacred Hymns, Germany, 2010
- Alexander Brincken: 4th. Sinfonie and Capriccio for piano and Orchestra, TOCCATA CLASSICS. Royal Scottish National Orchestra, Director: Rainer Held, 2020

== Personal life ==
Brincken speaks Armenian fluently.
