= Lillian West =

American actress

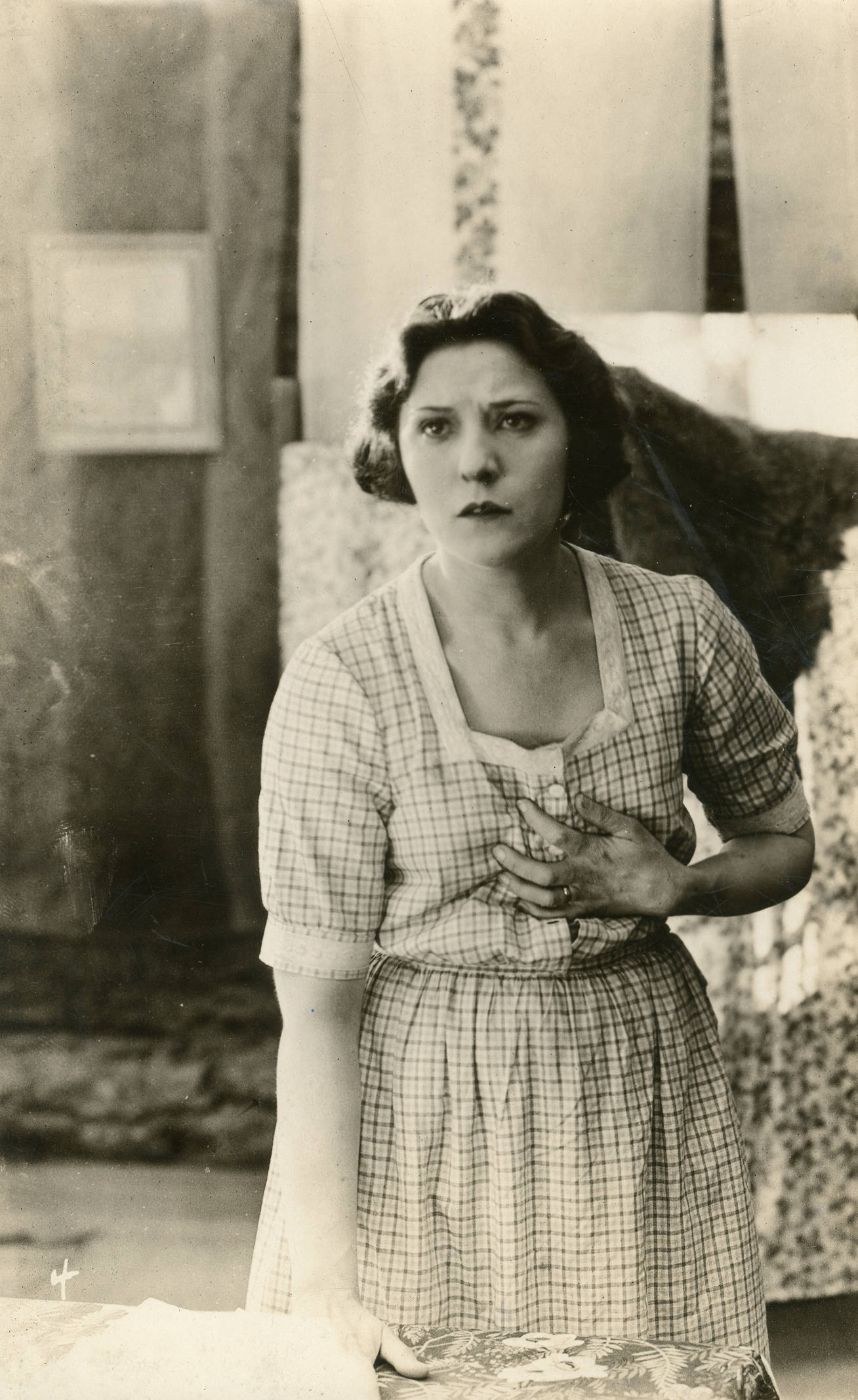
- Lillian West in 1922
- Born: Mildred West; March 15, 1886; New York, New York, US
- Died: April 23, 1970 (aged 84); Los Angeles, California, US
- Occupation: Actress
- Years active: 1916–1958

Lillian West (March 15, 1886 – April 23, 1970) was an American film actress. She appeared in more than 100 films between 1916 and 1958.

== Biography ==
Mildred West was born in New York, New York. She was raised by relatives in Hoboken, New Jersey, after her mother fell ill. She began a stage career in her teens, using the name "Lillian West", and toured the American Midwest in Texas Sweethearts in 1908. She worked in silent pictures, and in several sound pictures after 1929. She died in 1970, in Los Angeles, California, at the age of 84.

== Partial filmography ==
- Shadows (1916)
- Vengeance of the Dead (1917)
- The Hidden Children (1917)
- The Gown of Destiny (1917)
- Limousine Life (1918)
- Society for Sale (1918)
- Everywoman's Husband (1918)
- Ravished Armenia (1919)
- Prudence on Broadway (1919)
- The Island of Intrigue (1919)
- Colorado (1921)
- Paid Back (1922)
- Barriers of Folly (1922)
- 7th Heaven (1927)
- The Right to Love (1930)
- Sinister Hands (1932)
- Wives Never Know (1936)
- Laugh It Off (1939)
- Nobody's Children (1940)
- Where Danger Lives (1950)
