= Aurora Mardiganian =

Survivor of the Armenian genocide (1901–1994)

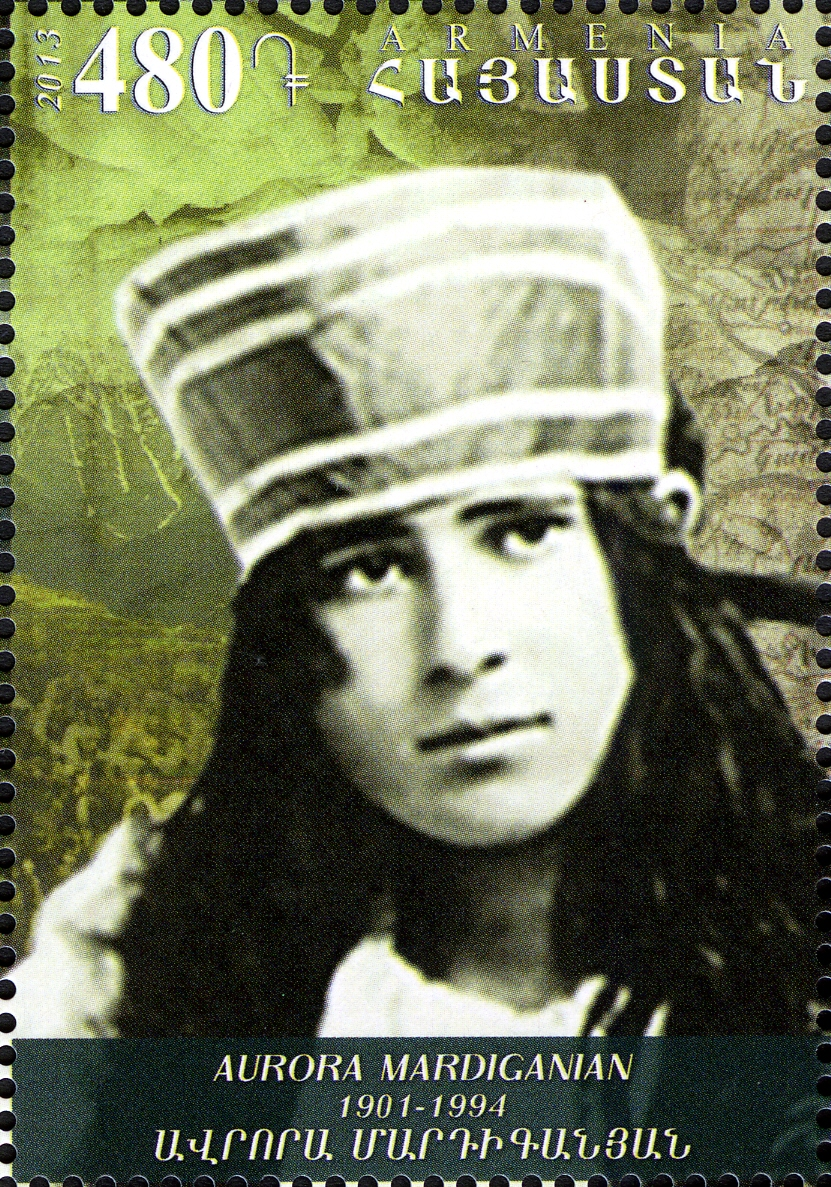
- Aurora Mardiganian on a 2013 Armenian stamp
- Born: Arshaluys Mardiganian; January 12, 1901; Chmshgatsak, Mamuret-ül Aziz vilayet, Ottoman Empire
- Died: February 6, 1994 (aged 93); Los Angeles, California, U.S.
- Occupations: Author, actress
- Notable work: Ravished Armenia (1918); Ravished Armenia (Auction of Souls) (1919)

Aurora Mardiganian (Armenian: Աուրորա [Արշալոյս] Մարտիկանեան; January 12, 1901 – February 6, 1994) was an Armenian-American author, actress, and a survivor of the Armenian genocide. Arriving in America as a teenager, she co-wrote a 1918 book about her experience, Ravished Armenia, and played the title role in a 1919 silent movie based on the book, titled Auction of Souls or Ravished Armenia. Most of the film is now lost. An animated documentary about her life, titled Aurora's Sunrise, was released in 2022.

== Biography ==
Born as Arshaluys Mardigian, she was the daughter of a prosperous Armenian family living in Chmshgatsak (Çemişgezek), in the Ottoman Empire's province of Mamuret-ül Aziz.

During the Armenian genocide in 1915, she witnessed the deaths of her family members and was forced to march over 1,400 mi (2,300 km), during which she was kidnapped and sold into the slave markets of Anatolia. Mardiganian escaped from a harem; with the help of Near East Relief she traveled to Tiflis (modern Tbilisi, Georgia), then to St. Petersburg, to Kristiania (modern Oslo, Norway) and finally to New York City, where she arrived in 1917.

In New York, she was approached by Harvey Gates, a young screenwriter, who became her guardian and helped her write and publish a narrative that is often described as a memoir, titled Ravished Armenia (full title Ravished Armenia; the Story of Aurora Mardiganian, the Christian Girl, Who Survived the Great Massacres). It was published in 1918. To accommodate American audiences, her name was changed to Aurora Mardiganian.

The book was used for writing a script for a silent film. The film was produced in 1919, Mardiganian playing herself, and was first screened in London as Auction of Souls. The first New York performance of the film, then titled Ravished Armenia, took place on February 16, 1919, in the ballroom of the Plaza Hotel, with society leaders, Mrs. Oliver Harriman and Mrs. George W. Vanderbilt, serving as co-hostesses on behalf of the American Committee for Armenian and Syrian Relief (which was then the name of Near East Relief). Most of the film is now lost.

Mardiganian appeared at several screenings of the film, which was a central part of a successful fund raising campaign for the Near East Relief charity. She was referred to in the press as the Armenian Joan of Arc, describing her role as the spokesperson for the victims of the horrors that were then taking place in Turkey and the catalyst for the humanist movement in America.

Mardiganian married in the 1920s and lived in Los Angeles. Later in life she was interviewed several times about her experiences. In an interview with film historian Anthony Slide some 70 years after the fact, she revealed that a scene in the film in which sixteen young Armenian girls were "crucified" by their Ottoman tormentors was inaccurate. Auction of Souls showed the victims nailed to crosses, but:

The Turks didn't make their crosses like that. The Turks made little pointed crosses. They took the clothes off the girls. They made them bend down, and after raping them, they made them sit on the pointed wood, through the vagina. That's the way they killed - the Turks. Americans have made it a more civilized way. They can't show such terrible things.

She died on February 6, 1994, aged 93. She lived long enough to see that Armenia had declared independence from the Soviet Union three years earlier.

== Legacy ==
The Aurora Prize for Awakening Humanity has been awarded annually since 2016; it is named in honor of Aurora Mardiganian.

The animated documentary film Aurora's Sunrise about her life premiered in June 2022. It also includes scenes of the film Auction of Souls and it was Armenia's entry to the Academy Awards for 2023.

A statue commemorating Aurora Mardiganian and the martyrs of the Armenian genocide was unveiled in Yerevan on September 30, 2024.

== See also ==
- Rape during the Armenian genocide
