= Ravished Armenia (film) =

1919 film by Oscar Apfel

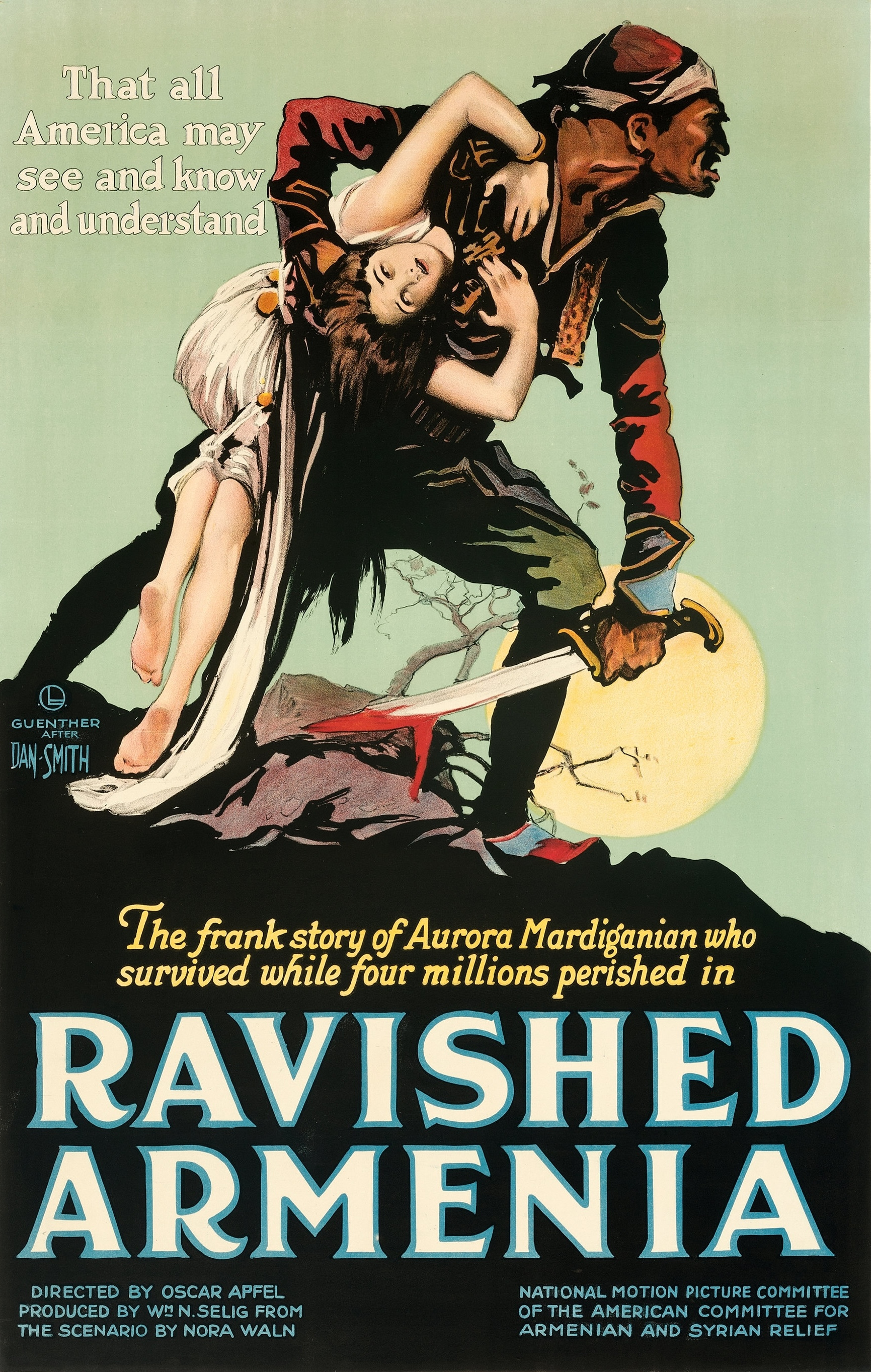
- Original 1919 poster for the film
- Directed by: Oscar Apfel
- Written by: Harvey Gates; Aurora Mardiganian; Nora Waln; Frederic Chapin
- Produced by: William Nicholas Selig
- Starring: Aurora Mardiganian; Irving Cummings; Anna Q. Nilsson; Henry Morgenthau; Lillian West
- Distributed by: First National Pictures
- Release date: January 19, 1919
- Country: United States
- Language: Silent (English subtitles)
- Box office: $1 million

Ravished Armenia, also known as Auction of Souls, is a 1919 American silent film based on the autobiographical book Ravished Armenia by Arshaluys "Aurora" Mardiganian, who also played herself in the lead role of the film. The film, which depicts the 1915 Armenian genocide by the Ottoman Empire from the point of view of Armenian survivor Mardiganian, survives only in fragments.

== Plot ==
According to a contemporary New York Times article, the first half of the film shows "Armenia as it was before Turkish and German devastation, and led up to the deportation of priests and thousands of families into the desert. One of the concluding scenes showed young Armenian women flogged for their refusal to enter Turkish harems and depicted the Turkish slave markets." The story was adapted for the screen by Henry Leyford Gates, who also wrote the book.

== Production ==
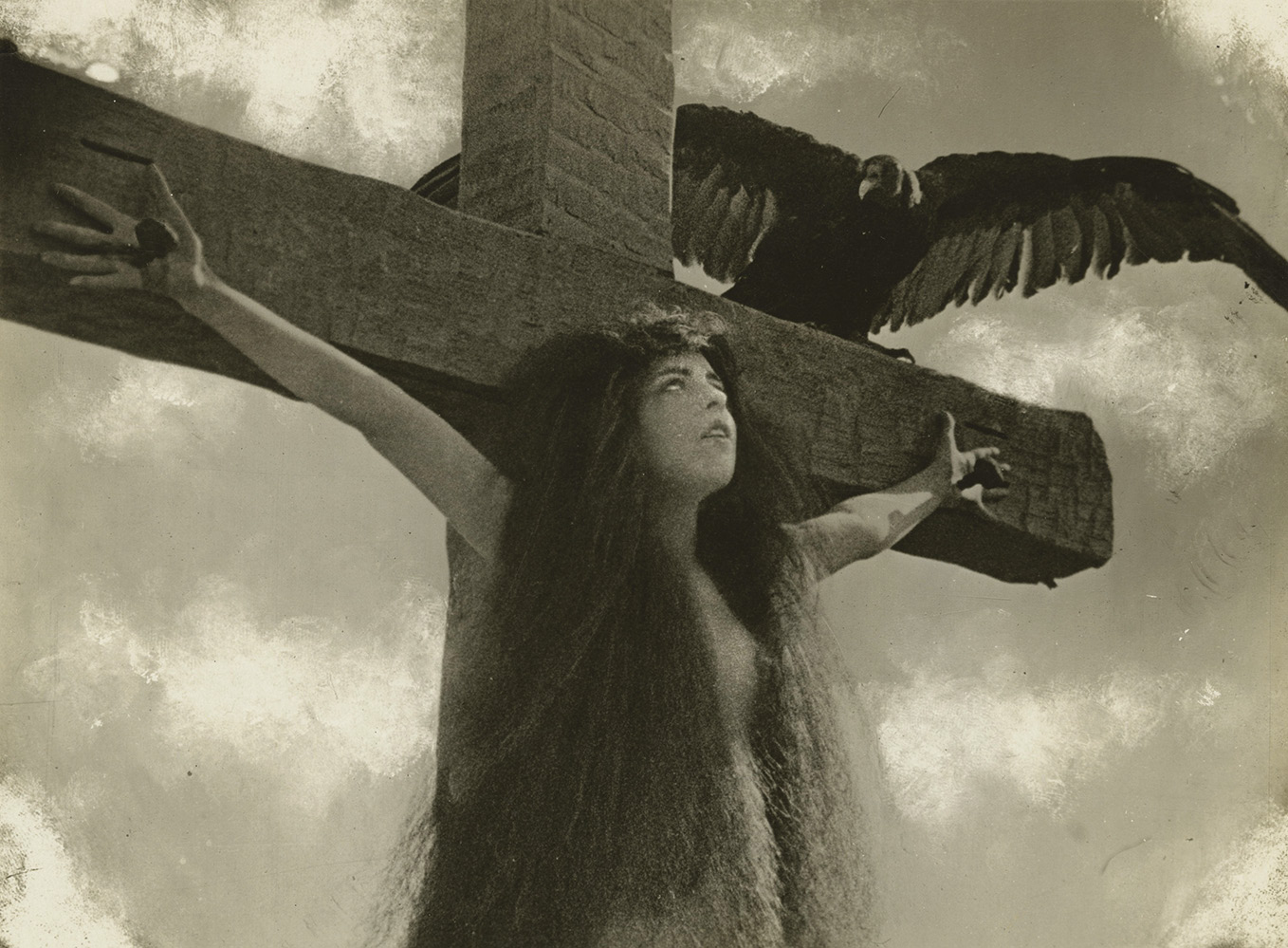
Still of one of the crucified girls

A surviving part of the film

The William Selig production was filmed in 1918–1919 near Newhall, California. During the shooting of a scene in which Mardiganian escaped from a harem by jumping from one roof to another, she fell and broke her ankle. The production continued, however, with her being carried to each set. A massacre scene used as extras several thousand Armenian residents of southern California, many of whom were survivors of similar events.

The film shows young Armenian girls being "crucified" by being nailed to crosses. However, almost 70 years later, Mardiganian revealed to film historian Anthony Slide that the scene was inaccurate:

The Turks didn't make their crosses like that. The Turks made little pointed crosses. They took the clothes off the girls. They made them bend down, and after raping them, they made them sit on the pointed wood, through the vagina. That's the way they killed – the Turks. Americans have made it a more civilized way. They can't show such terrible things.

H.L. Gates later ghostwrote a 20-part newspaper series for "Queen of the Artists' Studios" Audrey Munson in which he described the filming of the crucifixion scene in the California desert. He stated that one of the twelve art models employed for the scene, one Corinne Gray, died several days later from influenza as a result of exposure during filming.

Mardiganian felt she had been cheated out of her $7,000 fee for the film, having received only $195. She sued her legal guardian, novelist Eleanor Brown Gates—Henry Layford Gates's wife—and was awarded $5,000.

== Distribution ==
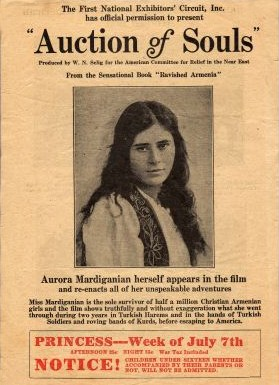
Promotional flyer featuring the film's alternative title, Auction of Souls, and an image of Aurora Mardiganian.

The initial New York performance of the eight-reel (approximately two-hour) silent film took place on February 16, 1919, in the ballroom of the Plaza Hotel, with society leaders Mrs. Oliver Harriman and Mrs. George W. Vanderbilt serving as co-hostesses on behalf of the American Committee for Armenian and Syrian Relief. To raise funds for the charity, the movie was shown in several American cities at an admission price of $10 per person, at a time when the typical American theater charged an admission of 25¢ to 35¢. Later, when the film went into general distribution, ads described it as the "$10 per seat picture."

The film was first screened in London under the title Auction of Souls. In 1920, it was shown twice daily for three weeks at the Royal Albert Hall to obtain support for the protection of national minorities. The movie contained depictions of the flogging and nude crucifixion of women, and the producers agreed to cuts to five scenes for the showings at the hall. The film was not submitted to the British Board of Film Censors, which therefore never certified it for general viewing in the United Kingdom.

The movie premiered in Paris on December 11, 1919, at the Salle Gaveau. It was sponsored by the Duchess of Rohan.

== Reception ==
Because of the film's subject matter, distributors often scheduled limited showings of the film to community leaders prior to releasing it to local theaters. Still, in some states there were attempts to ban or censor the film. For example, after the Pennsylvania State Board of Censors banned the film, the distributors sued and overturned the state agency decision in court. In reversing the board's ban, the decision of the judge stated:

The court finds it a fact and a question of law that there is nothing in the scenes which make them sacrilegious, obscene, indecent or immoral, or such nature as to tend to debase or corrupt morals. Viewing the picture as a whole, the court finds as a fact that it is educational in nature. It is not only a vivid portrayal of the story Ravished Armenia, but it is also a picture of conditions as they existed in Armenia a few months ago.

== Legacy ==
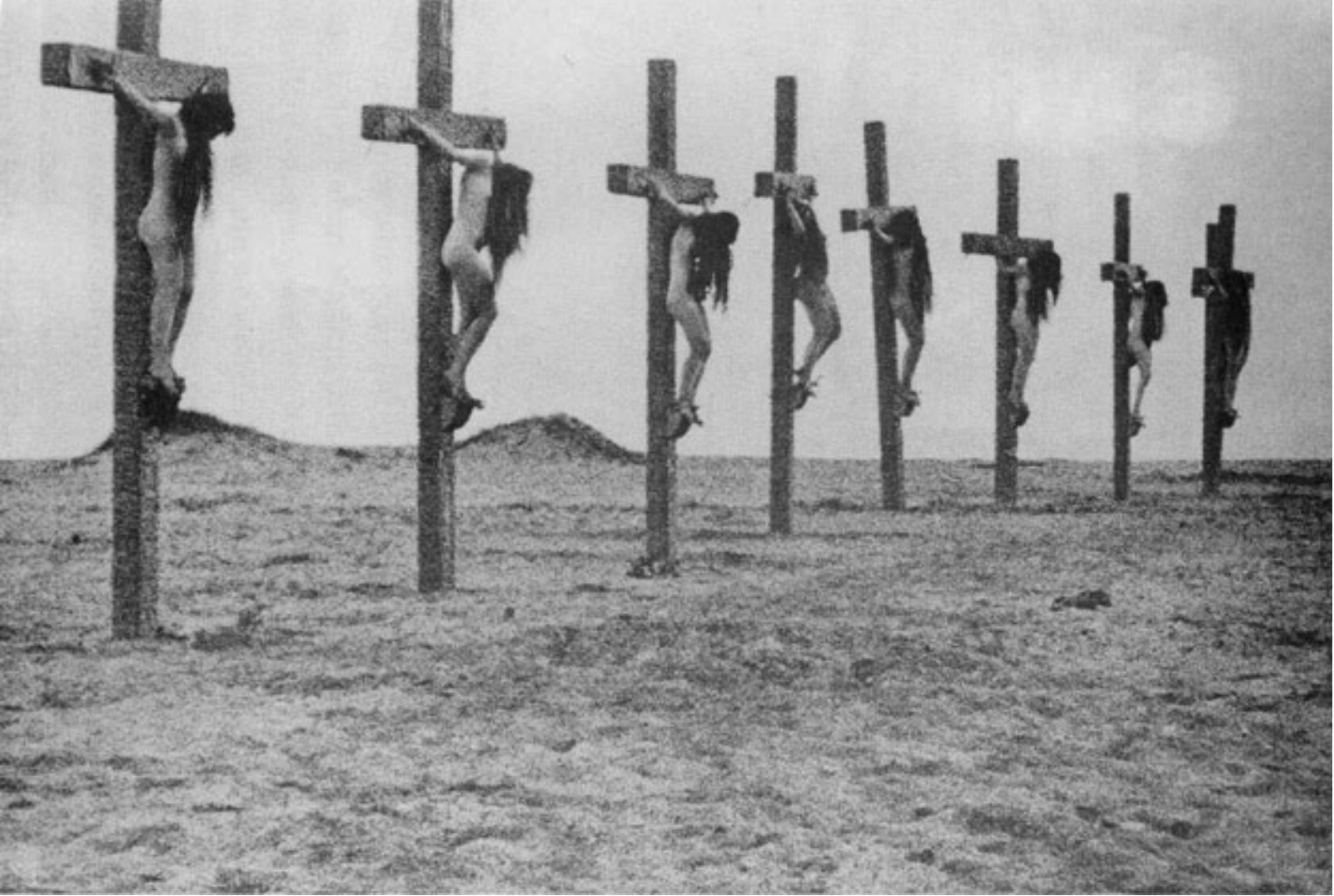
Depiction of the crucifixion of Armenian girls; the image has frequently been misidentified as an authentic photograph from the Armenian genocide.

Andrew Goldberg's television documentary The Armenian Americans (2000) includes extant footage from the film.

In 2014, the film historian Anthony Slide published the original screenplay in a volume that also reprints the book Ravished Armenia, and includes a discussion of Mardiganian's work. The book is titled Ravished Armenia and the Story of Aurora Mardiganian.

The film Aurora's Sunrise (2022), an adult animated biography of Mardiganian, incorporates footage from the movie.

The still image from the film depicting Armenian girls crucified by Ottoman forces has frequently been circulated online and on social media as an authentic wartime photograph of an event during the Armenian genocide. Historians and fact-checking organisations have noted that the image's widespread circulation without context has contributed to the misconception that it documents an actual crucifixion photographed during the genocide.

== Preservation ==
The film was thought to be completely lost until 1994, when Eduardo Kozlanian discovered a 14–15-minute fragment in the Film Archive of Yerevan. An unknown company began selling a VHS transfer of the segment in the early 2000s. In 2009, the Armenian Genocide Resource Center of Northern California released a DVD containing the fragment, which has been restored, edited, and captioned. A slideshow of stills from the movie is included as well.

== See also ==
- Henry Morgenthau Sr.
- The Forty Days of Musa Dagh
