= J. Michael Hagopian =

American film director (1913–2010)

Jakob Michael Hagopian (Armenian: Յակոբ Մայքլ Յակոբեան; October 20, 1913 – December 10, 2010) was an Armenian-born American Emmy-nominated filmmaker.

== Biography ==
Hagopian was born to an Armenian family on 20 October 1913, in Kharpert, Mamuret-ul-Aziz Vilayet, Ottoman Empire. In summer of 1915, when the Ottoman soldiers rampaged through Kharpert, Michael's mother hid her child in a mulberry bush and prayed that the soldiers would not find him. Both escaped, and moved to Fresno, California.

Hagopian received an undergraduate degree from the University of California, Berkeley, and after receiving a doctorate in international relations from Harvard University, he went into cinema and founded the Atlantis Films Company, which produced over fifty documentary films on ethnic minorities and foreign lands. He won critical acclaim, including two Emmy nominations for his film The Forgotten Genocide, the first full-length feature on the Armenian genocide. The film encompassed twenty years of research and nearly 400 witness interviews.

In 1979, Hagopian founded the non-profit Armenian Film Foundation dedicated to preserving the visual and personal histories of the witnesses to the Armenian Genocide.

In 2004 Hagopian's "Germany and the Secret Genocide" documentary became the winner of US International Film & Video Festival.

The pre-release version of Hagopian's 58-minute documentary "The River Ran Red" opened the Eighth Annual Arpa International Film Festival on Oct. 24, 2008 at the Egyptian Theatre in Hollywood, California, four days after Hagopian's 95th birthday.

== Other awards ==
- Arpa Lifetime Achievement Award.
- Armin T. Wegner Humanitarian Award, 2006.
- Jewish World Watch's 'I Witness' Award.

== Filmography ==
- The Witnesses Trilogy
  - Part 3:The River Ran Red (DVD). Armenian Film Foundation. 2009. Archived from the original on 2011-07-25.
  - Part 2:Germany and the Secret Genocide (DVD). Thousand Oaks, California: Armenian Film Foundation. 2003. OCLC 61369507. Archived from the original on 2008-06-03.
  - Part 1: Voices from the Lake (DVD). Thousand Oaks, CA: Armenian Film Foundation. 2000. OCLC 60767918. Archived from the original on 2008-05-11.
- From Bitlis to Fresno: The Karabians of Fresno (DVD). Armenian Film Foundation. 1997. OCLC 61832358. Archived from the original on 2009-05-31.
- Ararat Beckons (Videotape). Hollywood Film & Video. 1991. OCLC 25074751. Archived from the original on 2008-05-11.
- The Armenian Genocide (DVD). Thousand Oaks, California: Armenian Film Foundation. 1991. OCLC 60768143. Archived from the original on 2012-08-18. (Produced for the Curriculum Development and Supplemental Materials Commission of the State of California.)
- Strangers in a Promised Land (DVD). Thousand Oaks, California: Armenian Film Foundation. 1986. OCLC 180933802. Archived from the original on 2008-05-11.
- The Armenian case (DVD). Thousand Oaks, California: Atlantis Productions. 1975. OCLC 71224858. Archived from the original on 2008-02-14.
- The Forgotten Genocide (DVD). United States: Atlantis Productions. 1975. OCLC 60767995. Archived from the original on 2008-05-13.
- Cilicia . . . Rebirth in Aleppo (DVD). Thousand Oaks, CA: Armenian Film Foundation. OCLC 181238609. Archived from the original on 2008-05-11.
- California Armenians: The First Generation
- The Art of Traditional Armenian Cooking
- Where Are My People? (DVD). Thousand Oaks, CA: Armenian Film Foundation. OCLC 60768330.
- Soviet Boy
- Historical Armenia (DVD). United States: Atlantis Productions. 1967. OCLC 181231956. Archived from the original on 2008-05-11.
- African Girl-Malobi (1960)
- Africa is My Home (1960)
- Himalayas: Life on the Roof of the World. 1958.
