= Golden Apricot Yerevan International Film Festival =

Annual film festival in Yerevan, Armenia

- Opening film: In the Land of Arto by Tamara Stepanyan
- Closing film: Once Within a Time by Godfrey Reggio and Jon Kane
- Location: Yerevan, Armenia
- Founded: 2004
- Most recent: 2026
- Directors: Atom Egoyan (Honorary Chairman) Harutyun Khachatryan (General Director); Susanna Harutyunyan (Artistic Director) Mikayel Stamboltsyan (Program Director)
- Producers: "Golden Apricot" Fund for Cinema Development, Armenian Association of Film Critics and Cinema Journalists
- Festival date: Opening: 12 July 2026; Closing: 19 July 2026
- Language: Armenian, English
- Website: www.gaiff.am

Current: 23rd
- 24th 22nd

The Golden Apricot Yerevan International Film Festival (GAIFF; Armenian: «Ոսկե Ծիրան» Երևանի միջազգային կինոփառատոն, romanized: "Voske Tsiran" Yerevani mijazgayin kinop'arraton) is an annual film festival held in Yerevan, Armenia. The festival was founded in 2004 with the co-operation of the Golden Apricot Fund for Cinema Development, the Armenian Association of Film Critics and Cinema Journalists. The GAIFF is continually supported by the Ministry of Foreign Affairs of Armenia, the Ministry of Culture of Armenia and the Benevolent Fund for Cultural Development. The objectives of the festival are "to present new works by the film directors and producers in Armenia and foreign cinematographers of Armenian descent and to promote creativity and originality in the area of cinema and video art".

== History ==
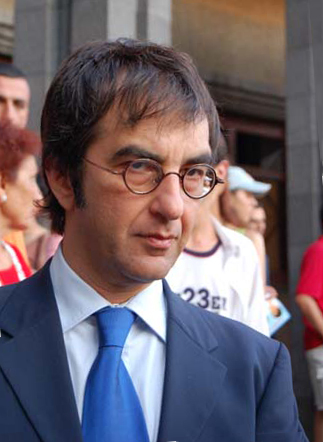
Atom Egoyan at the third edition of the festival

The Golden Apricot Annual Film Festival was established in 2004 in Yerevan, by the "Golden Apricot" Fund for Cinema Development, the Armenian Association of Film Critics and Cinema Journalists, supported by the Ministry of Foreign Affairs of Armenia, the Ministry of Culture of Armenia and Benevolent Fund for Cultural Development. Canadian-Armenian director Atom Egoyan was named president of the festival since 2005.

The Festival is dedicated to the theme of Crossroads of Cultures and Civilizations, and features a multitude of films representing various nations and religions, collectively depicting the richness of the human experience.

In 2005, the establishment of a network of filmmakers of the region entitled Directors Across Borders was initiated by the "Golden Apricot" Film Festival.

Since 2005 Golden Apricot has been functioning under the aegis of the European Cultural Parliament.

In 2010, the festival was awarded by the FICTS Plate D'honneur.

In 2017, festival organizers cancelled the screening of an off-competition program entitled, "Armenians: Internal And External Views", with no reasons given. LGBT activists took to social media to criticize the cancellation, with some claiming that two LGBTQ+-themed films — Apricot Groves and Listen to Me: Untold Stories Beyond Hatred — were the reason for the cancellation. Atom Egoyan and Arsinée Khanjian, prominent Armenian Canadian figures in cinema, denounced this cancellation. An open letter signed by filmmakers, activists, politicians, and others denouncing the cancellation was published, and LGBTQ+ rights organizations Pink Armenia and GALAS LGBTQ+ Armenian Society strongly criticized the censorship. The EU's Eastern Partnership Civil Society Forum called on Armenian authorities to fulfill their international commitments, stating that "The incident... runs contrary to the process of Armenia's joining the Creative Europe programme".

In 2025, 22nd edition of the Golden Apricot International Film Festival was held from 13 July to 20 July. It opened with It Was Just an Accident by Iranian filmmaker Jafar Panahi, and closed with the Armenian classic Last Station, 1994 film by Harutyun Khachatryan and Nora Armani.

== Awards and categories of competition ==
The major awards at the GAIFF are the Golden Apricot and Silver Apricot prizes for feature, documentary and Armenian panorama films. Lifetime achievement is recognized by the Parajonov's Thaler Award, named in honour of Sergei Parajanov.

The various categories and prize names are as follows:

International Feature Competition

1. Golden Apricot – Best Feature Film

2. Silver Apricot – Special Prize

International Documentary Competition

1. Golden Apricot – Best Documentary Film

2. Silver Apricot – Special Prize

"Apricot Stone" Short Film Competition

1. Golden Stone – Best Short Film

2. Special Prize

"Armenian Panorama" National Competition

1. Golden Apricot – Best Fiction Film

2. Golden Apricot – Best Documentary Film

3. Silver Apricot – Special Prize

== Winners of the Grand Prix - Golden Apricot main prize for Best Feature Film ==
=== Awards GAIFF 2004 ===
Category	Award	Film	Director	Country
International Feature Competition	Golden Apricot for Best Feature Film	Ararat	Atom Egoyan	Canada
International Documentary Competition	Golden Apricot for Best Documentary Film	Tale About Pegasus (Armenian: Հեքիաթ թեվավոր ձիու մասին)	Armen Khachatryan	Armenia
Short Film Competition	Golden Apricot for Best Short Film	Je m'appelle	Stéphane Elmadjian	France
Animation and Experimental Film	Golden Apricot for Best Armenian Film	Freedub 1	Stéphane Elmadjian	France
Jury Special Prize	Jury Special Prize for Best Feature Film	A Place in the World	Artour Aristakisian	Russia
Jury Special Prize	Jury Special Prize for Best Animation and Experimental Film	Ligne de Vie	Serge Avedikian	France
Special Mention	Special Mention for Best Documentary Film	I Died in Childhood...	Georgiy Paradzhanov	Russia

=== Awards GAIFF 2005 ===
Category	Award	Film	Director	Country
International Feature Competition	Golden Apricot for Best Feature Film	The Sun	Alexander Sokurov	Russia, Italy, Switzerland, France
International Feature Competition	Silver Apricot Special Prize for Feature Film	4	Ilya Khrzhanovsky	Russia
International Feature Competition	Silver Apricot Special Prize for Feature Film	Los Muertos (The Dead)	Lisandro Alonso	Argentina, Netherlands, France
International Feature Competition	Jury Special Mention	Paradise Girls	Fow Pyng Hu	Netherlands
International Documentary Competition	Golden Apricot for Best Documentary Film	3 Rooms Of Melancholia	Pirjo Honkasalo	Finland, Sweden, Denmark, Germany
International Documentary Competition	Silver Apricot Special Prize for Documentary Film	Moskatchka	Annett Schutz	Latvia, Germany
International Documentary Competition	Silver Apricot Special Prize for Documentary Film	Oh! Man	Yervant Gianikian, Angela Ricci Lucchi	Italy
Armenian Panorama Competition	Golden Apricot for Best Armenian Film	Hammer & Flame	Von (Vahan) Pilikian	United Kingdom
Armenian Panorama Competition	Golden Apricot for Best Armenian Film	Under the Open Sky	Arman Yeritsyan	Armenia
Armenian Panorama Competition	Golden Apricot for Best Armenian Film	The Road	Naira Muradyan	Armenia
Armenian Panorama Competition	Jury Diploma	Born in Fire	Suren Ter-Grigoryan	Armenia
Armenian Panorama Competition	Jury Diploma	Planet Zorthian	Arno Yeretzian, Sevag Vrej, Harout Arakelian, Lisa Tchakmakian	United States
Armenian Panorama Competition	Jury Diploma	One Balloon	Aram Hekinian, Aruna Naimji	United States
Armenian Panorama Competition	Jury Diploma	One Fine Morning (Un Beau Matin)	Serge Avedikian	France
Parajanov's Thaler – Lifetime Achievement Award			Abbas Kiarostami	Iran
Parajanov's Thaler – Lifetime Achievement Award			Krzysztof Zanussi	Poland
Parajanov's Thaler – Lifetime Achievement Award			Nikita Mikhalkov	Russia
Prize of the Armenian Filmmakers Union for the Best Director		Long Gone (Documentary)	Jack Cahil	United States
Prizes of the Armenian Association of Film Critics and Cinema Journalists for the Best Feature Film		My Father Is an Engineer	Robert Guédiguian	France
Prizes of the Armenian Association of Film Critics and Cinema Journalists for the Best Feature Film		Waiting for the Clouds	Yeşim Ustaoğlu	Turkey
Hrant Matevosyan Fund Prix for the Best Script in Armenian Panorama		The Road	Naira Muradyan	Armenia

=== Awards GAIFF 2006 ===
Category	Award	Film	Director	Country
International Feature Competition	Golden Apricot for Best Feature Film	Three Times	Hou Hsiao-hsien	Taiwan, China, France
International Feature Competition	Silver Apricot Special Prize for Feature Film	The Legend of Time	Isaki Lacuesta	Spain
International Feature Competition	Silver Apricot Special Prize for Feature Film	Trip To Armenia (Le voyage en Arménie)	Robert Guédiguian	France
International Documentary Competition	Golden Apricot for Best Documentary Film	Workingman's Death	Michael Glawogger	Austria
International Documentary Competition	Silver Apricot Special Prize for Documentary Film	Estamira	Marcos Prado	Brazil
International Documentary Competition	Jury Special Mention	Ljudmila & Anatolij	Gunnar Bergdahl	Sweden
Armenian Panorama Competition	Golden Apricot for Best Armenian Film	The Dwellers of Forgotten Islands	Hrant Hakobyan	Armenia
Jury Special Mention	Posthumous Lifetime Achievement Award		Ara Vahuni	Armenia
Parajanov's Thaler – Lifetime Achievement Award			Artavazd Peleshyan	Armenia
Parajanov's Thaler – Lifetime Achievement Award			Marko Bellocchio	Italy
Parajanov's Thaler – Lifetime Achievement Award			Tonino Guerra	Italy
Parajanov's Thaler – Lifetime Achievement Award			Mohsen Makhmalbaf	Iran
Parajanov's Thaler – Lifetime Achievement Award			Godfrey Reggio	United States
Awards for Emerging Filmmakers		The Genocide in Me	Araz Artinyan	Canada
Awards for Emerging Filmmakers		My Name is Happiness	Vardan Hakobyan	Russia
Awards for Emerging Filmmakers		The Lighthouse	Maria Sahakyan	Russia, Armenia
Armenian Association of Film Critics and Cinema Journalists Prize		Summer in Berlin	Andreas Dresen	Germany
Armenian Association of Film Critics and Cinema Journalists Prize		Returner	Serge Avedikian	France

=== Awards GAIFF 2007 ===
Category	Award	Film	Director	Country
International Feature Competition	Golden Apricot for Best Feature Film	Import/Export	Ulrich Seidl	Austria
International Feature Competition	Silver Apricot Special Prize for Feature Film	Nuovomondo	Emanuele Crialese	Italy, France
International Feature Competition	Jury Diploma	Flanders	Bruno Dumont	France
International Documentary Competition	Golden Apricot for Best Documentary Film	A Story of People in War and Peace	Vardan Hovhannisyan	Armenia
International Documentary Competition	Silver Apricot Special Prize for Documentary Film	The White She-Camel	Christiaens Xavier	Belgium
Armenian Panorama Competition	Golden Apricot for Best Armenian Film	Screamers	Carla Garapedian	United Kingdom
Armenian Panorama Competition	Silver Apricot Special Prize for Armenian Film	A Story of People in War and Peace	Vardan Hovhannisyan	Armenia
Armenian Panorama Competition	Jury Diploma	Graffiti	Igor Apasyan	Russia
Armenian Panorama Competition	Jury Diploma	Seven Indian Boys	Ashot Mkrtchyan	Armenia
Parajanov's Thaler – Lifetime Achievement Award			Paolo and Vittorio Taviani	Italy
FIPRESCI Award		A Story of People in War and Peace	Vardan Hovhannisyan	Armenia
Ecumenical Jury Awards		A Story of People in War and Peace	Vardan Hovhannisyan	Armenia
Ecumenical Jury Awards		Screamers	Carla Garapedian	United Kingdom
Wishing-Tree Prize		Dinner Time	Gor Baghdasaryan	Armenia

=== Awards GAIFF 2008 ===
Category	Award	Film	Director	Country
International Feature Competition	Golden Apricot for Best Feature Film	Mermaid	Anna Melikian	Russia
International Feature Competition	Silver Apricot Special Prize for Feature Film	Lemon Tree	Eran Riklis	Israel, France, Germany
International Feature Competition	Silver Apricot Special Prize for Feature Film	Wonderful Town	Aditya Assarat	Thailand
International Feature Competition	Jury Diploma	End of the Earth	Abolfazl Saffary	Iran
International Documentary Competition	Golden Apricot for Best Documentary Film	Women See Lot of Things	Meira Asher	Netherlands
International Documentary Competition	Silver Apricot Special Prize for Documentary Film	Lakshmi and Me	Nishtha Jain	India, United States, Finland, Denmark
Armenian Panorama Competition	Golden Apricot for Best Armenian Film	The Blue Hour	Eric Nazarian	United States
Armenian Panorama Competition	Silver Apricot Special Prize for Armenian Film	Gata	Diana Mkrtchyan	Russia
Armenian Panorama Competition	Jury Diploma	Jrarat, Miniatures	Mariam Ohanyan	Armenia
Parajanov's Thaler – Tribute to			Michelangelo Antonioni	Italy
Parajanov's Thaler – Lifetime Achievement Award			Wim Wenders	Germany
Parajanov's Thaler – Lifetime Achievement Award			Dariush Mehrjui	Iran
Special Silver Apricot – Pour l’Audance Artistique et Humaine			Catherine Breillat	France
FIPRESCI Award		My Marlon and Brando	Huseyin Karabey	Turkey
Ecumenical Jury Award		The Blue Hour	Eric Nazarian	United States
Jury Diploma		My Marlon and Brando	Huseyin Karabey	Turkey

=== Awards GAIFF 2009 ===
Category	Award	Film	Director	Country
International Feature Competition	Golden Apricot for Best Feature Film	The Other Bank	Giorgi Ovashvili	(Georgia (country)) Georgia, Kazakhstan
International Feature Competition	Silver Apricot Special Prize for Feature Film	Scratch	Michał Rosa	Poland
International Feature Competition	Jury Diploma	Autumn	Özcan Alper	Turkey, Germany
International Documentary Competition	Golden Apricot for Best Documentary Film	Burma VJ - Reporting from a Closed Country	Anders Østergaard	Denmark
International Documentary Competition	Silver Apricot Special Prize for Documentary Film	The Living	Sergey Bukovsky	Ukraine
International Documentary Competition	Jury Special Mention	Supermen of Malegaon	Faiza Ahmad Khan	India, Singapore, Japan
Armenian Panorama Competition	Golden Apricot for Best Armenian Film	With Love and Gratitude	Arka Manukyan	Armenia
Armenian Panorama Competition	Jury Diploma	Caucasian Niece	Levon Kalantar	Armenia
Armenian Panorama Competition	Jury Diploma	A World of Our Own	Frédéric Balekdjian	France
Special Prize "Master"			Kōhei Oguri	Japan
Special Prize "Master"			Rob Nilsson	United States
Special Prize "Master"			Sergei Solovyov	Russia
FIPRESCI Award		Autumn	Özcan Alper	Turkey, Germany
Ecumenical Jury Award		The Other Bank	Giorgi Ovashvili	(Georgia (country)) Georgia, Kazakhstan

=== Awards GAIFF 2010 ===
Category	Award	Film	Director	Country
International Feature Competition	Golden Apricot for Best Feature Film	Cosmos	Reha Erdem	Turkey, Bulgaria
International Feature Competition	Silver Apricot Special Prize for Feature Film	My Joy	Sergei Loznitsa	Ukraine, Germany, Netherlands
International Documentary Competition	Golden Apricot for Best Documentary Film	Together	Pavel Kostomarov	Russia
International Documentary Competition	Silver Apricot Special Prize for Documentary Film	The Woman With Five Elephants	Vadim Jendreyko	Germany, Switzerland
Armenian Panorama Competition	Golden Apricot for Best Armenian Film	The Last Tightrope Dancer in Armenia	Arman Yeritsyan, Inna Sahakyan	Armenia
Armenian Panorama Competition	Silver Apricot Special Prize for Armenian Film	Down Here	Comes Chahbazian	Belgium, France
Armenian Panorama Competition	Jury Special Mention	Uncle Valya	Nikolay Davtyan	Armenia
Parajanov's Thaler – Tribute to			Henri Verneuil	Armenia, France
Parajanov's Thaler – Lifetime Achievement Award"			Theo Angelopoulos	Greece
Parajanov's Thaler – Lifetime Achievement Award"			Claudia Cardinale	Italy
Special Prize "Master"			Claire Denis	France
Special Prize "Master"			Friðrik Þór Friðriksson	Iceland
Special Prize "Master"			Lee Chang-dong	South Korea
Special Prize "Master"			Stanislav Govorukhin	Russia
FIPRESCI Award		On the Path	Jasmila Žbanić	Bosnia and Herzegovina, Austria, Croatia, Germany
Ecumenical Jury Award		Don’t Look in the Mirror	Suren Babayan	Armenia
Jury Diploma		How I Ended This Summer	Alexei Popogrebski	Russia
British Council Award		Lernavan	Marat Sargsyan	Lithuania
Hrant Matevosyan Award		Lernavan	Marat Sargsyan	Lithuania

=== Awards GAIFF 2011 ===
Category	Award	Film	Director	Country
International Feature Competition	Golden Apricot for Best Feature Film	A Separation	Asghar Farhadi	Iran
International Feature Competition	Silver Apricot Special Prize for Feature Film	The Journals of Musan	Park Jung-bum	South Korea
International Feature Competition	Jury Special Prize	The Prize	Paula Markovitch	Mexico, France, Poland, Germany
International Documentary Competition	Golden Apricot for Best Documentary Film	The World According to Ion B.	Alexander Nanau	Russia
International Documentary Competition	Silver Apricot Special Prize for Documentary Film	Summer Pasture	Lynn True, Nelson Walker III, Tsering Perlo	United States, China
International Documentary Competition	Jury Special Mention	Magnificent Nothing	Ahmad Seyedkeshmiri	Iran
Armenian Panorama Competition	Golden Apricot for Best Armenian Film	Loading My Life	Haroutyun Shatyan	Armenia
Armenian Panorama Competition	Silver Apricot Special Prize for Armenian Film	The Spaceship	Emil Mkrttchian	Sweden
Armenian Panorama Competition	Jury Special Mention	The Last Hippie of the Pink City	Anastasia Popova	Russia
Apricot Stone	Golden Apricot	Glasgow	Piotr Subbotko	Poland
Apricot Stone	Jury Special Mention	Bicycle	Serhat Karaaslan	Turkey
Parajanov's Thaler – Lifetime Achievement Award			Béla Tarr	Hungary
Parajanov's Thaler – Lifetime Achievement Award			Fanny Ardant	France
Parajanov's Thaler – Lifetime Achievement Award			Roman Balayan	Ukraine
Special Prize "Master"			Nuri Bilge Ceylan	Turkey
Special Prize "Master"			Wojciech Marczewski	Poland
Special Prize "Master"			Alexei Uchitel	Russia
FIPRESCI Award		Mandoo	Ebrahim Saeedi	Iraq
Ecumenical Jury Award		Europolis	Cornel Gheorghita	Romania, France
Jury Commendation		Steel Gates	Armen Khachatryan	Armenia
Armenian National Film Academy Award		The Prize	Paula Markovitch	Mexico, France, Poland, Germany
Armenian Filmmakers Union Award		Loading My Life	Haroutyun Shatyan	Armenia
British Council Award		Loading My Life	Haroutyun Shatyan	Armenia
Hrant Matevosyan Award		The Spaceship	Emil Mkrttchian	Sweden

=== Awards GAIFF 2012 ===
Category	Award	Film	Director	Country
International Feature Competition	Golden Apricot for Best Feature Film	In the Fog	Sergei Loznitsa	Belarus, Russia, Germany, Netherlands, Latvia
International Feature Competition	Silver Apricot Special Prize for Feature Film	It Looks Pretty From a Distance	Anka Sasnal, Wilhelm Sasnal	Poland
International Documentary Competition	Golden Apricot for Best Documentary Film	5 Broken Cameras	Emad Burnat Guy Davidi	Palestine
International Documentary Competition	Silver Apricot Special Prize for Documentary Film	The Tundra Book. A Tale of Vukvukai, the Little Rock,	Aleksei Vakhrushev	Russia
International Documentary Competition	Jury Special Mention	Bakhmaro	Salome Jash	(Georgia (country)) Georgia, Germany
Armenian Panorama Competition	Best Armenian Fiction Film - Golden Apricot	If Only Everyone	Natalya Belyauskene	Armenia
Armenian Panorama Competition	Best Armenian Documentary - Golden Apricot	Armenian Rhapsody	Cassiana Der Haroutiounian Cesar Gananian, Gary Gananian	Brazil
Armenian Panorama Competition	Silver Apricot for Armenian Panorama	Nana	Valerie Massadian	France
Apricot Stone	Golden Apricot	When We Die At Night	Eduardo Morotó	Brazil
Apricot Stone	Jury Special Mention	Insignificant Details of the Accidental Episode	Mikhail Mestetsky	Russia
Parajanov's Thaler – Lifetime Achievement Award"			Víctor Erice	Spain
Parajanov's Thaler – Lifetime Achievement Award"			Agnieszka Holland	Poland
Parajanov's Thaler – Lifetime Achievement Award"			Eldar Shengelaia	(Georgia (country)) Georgia
Award of the Apostolic Church of Armenia – "Let There Be Light"			Alexander Sokurov	Russia
FIPRESCI Award		The First Rains of Spring	Yerlan Nurmukhambetov Sano Shinju	Japan, Kazakhstan
Ecumenical Jury Award		If Only Everyone	Natalya Belyauskene	Armenia
Jury Commendation		Future Lasts Forever	Özcan Alper	Turkey
Armenian National Film Academy Award		Grandma's Tattoos	Suzanne Khardalian	Sweden
British Council Award		Armenian Rhapsody	Cassiana Der Haroutiounian Cesar Gananian, Gary Gananian	Brazil
Armenian Filmmakers Union Award		With Fidel Whatever Happens	Goran Radovanovic	Serbia
Hrant Matevosyan Award		Bad Father	Tigrane Avedikian	France

=== Awards GAIFF 2013 ===
Category	Award	Film	Director	Country
International Feature Competition	Golden Apricot for Best Feature Film	Circles	Srdan Golubović	Germany, Serbia,France, Croatia, Slovenia
International Feature Competition	Silver Apricot Special Prize for Feature Film	Parviz	Majid Barzegar	Iran
International Feature Competition	Jury Special Mention	Araf – Somewhere In-Between	Yeşim Ustaoğlu	Germany, (France) Franc, Turkey
International Documentary Competition	Golden Apricot for Best Documentary Film	The Last Black Sea Pirates	Svetoslav Stoyanov	Bulgaria
International Documentary Competition	Silver Apricot Special Prize for Documentary Film	A World Not Ours	Mahdi Fleifel	United Kingdom
Armenian Panorama Competition	Best Armenian Fiction Film - Golden Apricot	I Am Going To Change My Name	Maria Sahakyan	Armenia, Russia, Denmark
Armenian Panorama Competition	Best Armenian Documentary - Golden Apricot	Saroyanland	Lusin Dink	Armenia,France,Turkey
Apricot Stone	Golden Apricot	Welcome and… Our Condolences	Leonid Prudovsky	Israel
Apricot Stone	Jury Special Mention	The Mother	Łukasz Ostalski	Poland
Apricot Stone	Jury Special Mention	The Swing of the Coffin Maker	Elmár Imánov	Germany
Apricot Stone	Jury Diploma	Rhino Full Throttle	Erik Schmitt	Germany
Parajanov's Thaler – Lifetime Achievement Award"			Charles Aznavour	France, Armenia
Parajanov's Thaler – Lifetime Achievement Award"			István Szabó	Hungary
Parajanov's Thaler – Lifetime Achievement Award"			Margarethe von Trotta	Germany
Parajanov's Thaler – Lifetime Achievement Award"			Jos Stelling	Netherlands
Parajanov's Thaler – Lifetime Achievement Award"			Nerses Hovhannisyan	Armenia
Special Prize Master			Ulrich Seidl	Austria
Award of the Apostolic Church of Armenia – "Let There Be Light"			Artavazd Peleshyan	Armenia
British Council Award for the Armenian Panorama Competition		Embers	Tamara Stepanyan	Armenia, Lebanon, Qatar
Armenian Filmmakers Union Award		A Mere Life	Sanghun Park	South Korea
Hrant Matevosyan Award for the best script in the Armenian Panorama Competition		Broken Childhood	Jivan Avetisyan	Armenia

=== Awards GAIFF 2014 ===
Category	Award	Film	Director	Country
International Feature Competition	Golden Apricot for Best Feature Film	The Tribe	Myroslav Slaboshpytskyi	Ukraine
International Feature Competition	Silver Apricot Special Prize for Feature Film	Blind Dates	Levan Koguashvili	(Georgia (country)) Georgia, Ukraine
International Documentary Competition	Golden Apricot for Best Documentary Film	The Stone River	Giovanni Donfrancesco	Italy, France
International Documentary Competition	[Domino Effect	Elwira Niewiera, Piotr Rosołowski	Poland, Germany	
Armenian Panorama Competition	Golden Apricot	Milky Brother	Vahram Mkhitaryan	Armenia Poland
Armenian Panorama Competition	Golden Apricot	Tevanik	Jivan Avetisyan	Armenia, Lithuania
Armenian Panorama Competition	Silver Apricot	Romaticists	Shoghik Tedevosyan, Areg Azatyan	Armenia
Armenian Panorama Competition	Jury Diploma	Please Be Normal	Haik Kocharian	United States
Apricot Stone	Golden Apricot	Though I Know the River Is Dry	Omar Robert Hamilton	Palestine, Egypt, Qatar, United Kingdom
Apricot Stone	Jury Special Prize	Red Hulk	Assimina Proedrou	Greece
Parajanov's Thaler – For outstanding artistic contribution into world cinema			Jia Zhangke	China
Parajanov's Thaler – For outstanding artistic contribution into world cinema			Kim Ki-duk	South Korea
Parajanov's Thaler – For outstanding artistic contribution into world cinema			Amos Gitai	Israel
Parajanov's Thaler – For outstanding artistic contribution into world cinema			Otar Iosseliani	(Georgia (country)) Georgia,
Parajanov's Thaler – For outstanding contribution into world festival movement			Marco Müller	Italy
Special Prize Master			Christian Berger	Austria
Award of the Apostolic Church of Armenia – "Let There Be Light"			Krzysztof Zanussi	Poland
FIPRESCI Jury Award		The Tribe	Myroslav Slaboshpytskyi	Ukraine
EcumenicalL Jury Award		The Abode	Lusine Sargsyan	Armenia
Special Commendation		Blind Dates	Levan Koguashvili	(Georgia (country)) Georgia,
Armenian Filmmakers Union Award		Andin: Armenian Journey Chronicles	Ruben Giney	Armenia, China, Russia, India
Armenian Filmmakers Union Award		Please Be Normal	Haik Kocharian	United States
Hrant Matevosyan Award for the best script in the Armenian Panorama Competition		Milky Brother	Vahram Mkhitaryan	Armenia Poland
Armen Mazmanian Special Award		Resurrection	Alain Manoukyan	Armenia

=== Awards GAIFF 2015 ===
Category	Award	Film	Director	Country
International Feature Competition	Golden Apricot for Best Feature Film	Embrace of the Serpent	Ciro Guerra	Colombia, Argentina, Venezuela
International Feature Competition	Silver Apricot Special Prize for Feature Film	End of Winter	Kim Dae-hwan	South Korea
International Feature Competition	Jury Special Mention	Ixcanul	Jayro Bustamant	Guatemala, France
International Documentary Competition	Golden Apricot	The Creation of Meaning	Simone Rapisarda Casanova	Canada, Italy
International Documentary Competition	Silver Apricot	A German Youth	Jean-Gabriel Périot	France, Germany, Switzerland
Armenian Panorama Competition	Golden Apricot	The Doctor	Anna Goroyan	Russia
Armenian Panorama Competition	Golden Apricot	One, Two, Three…	Arman Yeritsyan	Armenia, Germany, Norway
Armenian Panorama Competition	Jury Special Mention	Back To Gürün	Adrineh Gregorian	Armenia
Apricot Stone	Golden Apricot	Everything Will Be Okay	Patrick Vollrath	Austria,Germany
Apricot Stone	Jury Special Prize	Chelleh	Davood Khayyam	Iran
Apricot Stone	Jury Special Mention	Family For Sale	Sébastien Petretti	Belgium
Parajanov's Thaler – For outstanding artistic contribution into world cinema			Ornella Muti	Italy
Parajanov's Thaler – For outstanding artistic contribution into world cinema			Nastassja Kinski	Germany
Special Prize Master			Patrick Chesnais	France
Award of the Apostolic Church of Armenia – "Let There Be Light"			Robert Guédiguian	France
FIPRESCI Jury Award		Moskvich, my love	Aram Shahbazyan	Armenia, Russia, France
Ecumenical Jury Award		Moskvich, my love	Aram Shahbazyan	Armenia, Russia, France
Special Commendation		Sivas	Kaan Müjdeci	Germany, Turkey
Hrant Matevosyan Award for the best script in the Armenian Panorama Competition		The Road	Gagik Madoyan	Armenia
Audience Award		Sanctuary	Marc Brummund	Germany,

=== Awards GAIFF 2016 ===
Category	Award	Film	Director	Country
International Feature Competition	Golden Apricot for Best Feature Film	Ungiven	Branko Schmidt	Croatia
International Feature Competition	Silver Apricot Special Prize for Feature Film	Immortal	Seyed Hadi Mohaghegh	Iran
International Feature Competition	Jury Special Mention	The Prosecutor, The Defender, The Father And His Son	Iglika Triffonova	Bulgaria, Sweden, Netherlands
International Documentary Competition	Golden Apricot	Across the Don	Evgeny Grigoriev	Russia
International Documentary Competition	Silver Apricot	Don Juan	Jerzy Sladkowski	Sweden, Finland
International Documentary Competition	Jury Special Mention	Curumim	Marcos Prado	Brazil
Armenian Panorama Competition	Golden Apricot	Leopard's Silence		France
Armenian Panorama Competition	Golden Apricot	Good Morning	Anna Arevshatyan	Armenia
Armenian Panorama Competition	Golden Apricot	Stony Paths	Arnaud Khayadjanian	France
Armenian Panorama Competition	Jury Special Mention	28:94 Local Time	David Safarian	Armenia, Germany, Netherlands
Parajanov's Thaler – For outstanding artistic contribution into world cinema			Jacqueline Bisset	United States
Parajanov's Thaler – For outstanding artistic contribution into world cinema			Želimir Žilnik	Serbia
Parajanov's Thaler – For outstanding artistic contribution into world cinema			Ruben Gevorgyants	Armenia
Special Prize Master			Fred Kelemen	Germany
Special Prize Master			Vitaly Mansky	Russia
Award of the Apostolic Church of Armenia – "Let There Be Light"			Roman Balayan	Armenia, Ukraine
FIPRESCI Jury Award		Ungiven	Branko Schmidt	Croatia
Ecumenical Jury Award		Immortal	Seyed Hadi Mohaghegh	Iran
Hrant Matevosyan Award for the best script in the Armenian Panorama Competition		28:94 Local Time	David Safarian	Armenia, Germany, Netherlands
Festival's president Award		About Love	Anna Melikian	Russia

=== Awards GAIFF 2026 ===
The festival held its closing ceremony at Yerevan’s House of Cinema on 19 July 2026, giving following awards:

Category	Award	Film	Director	Country
International Feature Competition	Golden Apricot for Best Feature Film	The Currents	Milagros Mumenthaler	Switzerland, Argentina
International Feature Competition	Silver Apricot Special Prize for Feature Film	Past Future Continuous	Morteza Ahmadvand, Firouzeh Khosrovani	Iran, Norway, Italy
International Feature Competition	Jury Special Mention	London	Sebastian Brameshuber	Austria
Regional Panorama Competition	Golden Apricot	Inside Amir	Amir Azizi	Iran
Regional Panorama Competition	Silver Apricot	Dry Leaf	Alexandre Koberidze	Germany, Georgia
FIPRESCI Jury Award		Dry Leaf	Alexandre Koberidze	Germany, Georgia

== See also ==
- Media of Armenia
- WebApricot Pan-Armenian Film Festival
