= 5th Yerevan Golden Apricot International Film Festival =

- Location: Yerevan, Armenia
- Festival date: 13 – 20 July 2008
- Website: http://www.gaiff.am/en/

Yerevan Golden Apricot International Film Festival
- 6th 4th

The 5th Yerevan Golden Apricot International Film Festival was a film festival held in Yerevan, Armenia from 13–20 July 2008. The festival had more than 450 submissions from 67 countries; viewers had an opportunity to see over 160 films. Among the honorable guests of the festival were Wim Wenders, Enrica Antonioni, Goran Paskaljevic, Dariush Mehrjui, Catherine Breillat, and others. A Special Tribute was paid to Michelangelo Antonioni by honoring him with a posthumous Parajanov’s Thaler. Additionally, Wim Wenders and Dariush Mehrjui were honored with Parajanov’s Thaler Lifetime Achievement Awards. The main prizewinners of the 5th Golden Apricot were Anna Melikian from Russia for her film The Mermaid (Golden Apricot 2008 for the Best Feature Film), Meira Asher from Israel for the film Women See Lot of Things (Golden Apricot 2008 for the Best Documentary Film), and Eric Nazarian from the USA for The Blue Hour (Golden Apricot 2008 for the Best Film in the “Armenian Panorama”). The FIPRESCI Award went to Huseyn Karabey with his film My Marlon and Brando and the Ecumenical Award to Eric Nazarian with his film The Blue Hour.

== About the Golden Apricot Yerevan International Film Festival ==
The Golden Apricot Yerevan International Film Festival (GAIFF) (Armenian: «Ոսկե Ծիրան» Երևանի միջազգային կինոփառատոն) is an annual film festival held in Yerevan, Armenia. The festival was founded in 2004 with the co-operation of the “Golden Apricot” Fund for Cinema Development, the Armenian Association of Film Critics and Cinema Journalists. The GAIFF is continually supported by the Ministry of Foreign Affairs of the RA, the Ministry of Culture of the RA and the Benevolent Fund for Cultural Development.The objectives of the festival are "to present new works by the film directors and producers in Armenia and foreign cinematographers of Armenian descent and to promote creativity and originality in the area of cinema and video art".

== Awards GAIFF 2008 ==
Category	Award	Film	Director	Country
International Feature Competition	Golden Apricot for Best Feature Film	Mermaid	Anna Melikyan	Russia
International Feature Competition	Silver Apricot Special Prize for Feature Film	Lemon Tree	Eran Riklis	Israel, France, Germany
International Feature Competition	Silver Apricot Special Prize for Feature Film	Wonderful Town	Aditya Assarat	Thailand
International Feature Competition	Jury Diploma	End of the Earth	Abolfazl Saffary	Iran
International Documentary Competition	Golden Apricot for Best Documentary Film	Women See Lot of Things	Meira Asher	Netherlands
International Documentary Competition	Silver Apricot Special Prize for Documentary Film	Lakshmi and Me	Nishtha Jain	India, United States, Finland, Denmark
Armenian Panorama Competition	Golden Apricot for Best Armenian Film	The Blue Hour	Eric Nazarian	United States
Armenian Panorama Competition	Silver Apricot Special Prize for Armenian Film	Gata	Diana Mkrtchyan	Russia
Armenian Panorama Competition	Jury Diploma	Jrarat, Miniatures	Mariam Ohanyan	Armenia
Parajanov’s Thaler – Tribute to			Michelangelo Antonioni	Italy
Parajanov’s Thaler – Lifetime Achievement Award			Wim Wenders	Germany
Parajanov’s Thaler – Lifetime Achievement Award			Dariush Mehrjui	Iran
Special Silver Apricot – Pour l’Audance Artistique et Humaine			Catherine Breillat	France
FIPRESCI Award		My Marlon and Brando	Huseyin Karabey	Turkey
Ecumenical Jury Award		The Blue Hour	Eric Nazarian	United States
Jury Diploma		My Marlon and Brando	Huseyin Karabey	Turkey

== See also ==
- Golden Apricot Yerevan International Film Festival
- Atom Egoyan
- Anna Melikyan
- Eric Nazarian
- Wim Wenders
- Michelangelo Antonioni
- Catherine Breillat
- Eran Riklis
- Aditya Assarat
- Cinema of Armenia
- 2008 in film
