= 4th Yerevan Golden Apricot International Film Festival =

- Location: Yerevan, Armenia
- Festival date: 9 – 14 July 2007
- Website: http://www.gaiff.am/en/

Yerevan Golden Apricot International Film Festival
- 5th 3rd

The 4th Yerevan Golden Apricot International Film Festival was a film festival held in Yerevan, Armenia from 9–14 July 2007. More than 120 films from around the world were presented during the festival with attendance from contemporary filmmakers such as Bruno Dumont, Leos Carax, Carla Garapedian, Lee Chang-dong, Andrey Zvyagintsev, Aurora Quattrocchi and Tchéky Karyo. Paolo and Vittorio Taviani (Italy), directors of The Lark Farm (Opening Film of the Festival) were honored with Lifetime Achievement Awards. The international juries, headed by An Cheong-sook (South Korea), Martin Schweighofer (Austria), Vigen Chaldranyan (Armenia) awarded the following prizes: Golden Apricot 2007 for the Best Feature Film to Ulrich Seidl for his film Import/Export (Austria); Golden Apricot 2007 for the Best Documentary Film to Vardan Hovhannisyan for his film A Story of People in War and Peace (Armenia) and Golden Apricot 2007 for the Best Film in the “Armenian Panorama” to Screamers by Carla Garapedian (UK). Vardan Hovhannisyan (A Story of People in War and Peace) was awarded with the FIPRESCI and Ecumenical Jury Prizes and Carla Garapedian (Screamers) was also awarded the Ecumenical Jury Price.

== About the Golden Apricot Yerevan International Film Festival ==
The Golden Apricot Yerevan International Film Festival (GAIFF) (Armenian: «Ոսկե Ծիրան» Երևանի միջազգային կինոփառատոն) is an annual film festival held in Yerevan, Armenia. The festival was founded in 2004 with the co-operation of the “Golden Apricot” Fund for Cinema Development, the Armenian Association of Film Critics and Cinema Journalists. The GAIFF is continually supported by the Ministry of Foreign Affairs of the RA, the Ministry of Culture of the RA and the Benevolent Fund for Cultural Development.The objectives of the festival are "to present new works by the film directors and producers in Armenia and foreign cinematographers of Armenian descent and to promote creativity and originality in the area of cinema and video art".

== Awards GAIFF 2007 ==
Category	Award	Film	Director	Country
International Feature Competition	Golden Apricot for Best Feature Film	Import/Export	Ulrich Seidl	Austria
International Feature Competition	Silver Apricot Special Prize for Feature Film	Nuovomondo	Emanuele Crialese	Italy, France
International Feature Competition	Jury Diploma	Flanders	Bruno Dumont	France
International Documentary Competition	Golden Apricot for Best Documentary Film	A Story of People in War and Peace	Vardan Hovhannisyan	Armenia
International Documentary Competition	Silver Apricot Special Prize for Documentary Film	The White She-Camel	Christiaens Xavier	Belgium
Armenian Panorama Competition	Golden Apricot for Best Armenian Film	Screamers	Carla Garapedian	United Kingdom
Armenian Panorama Competition	Silver Apricot Special Prize for Armenian Film	A Story of People in War and Peace	Vardan Hovhannisyan	Armenia
Armenian Panorama Competition	Jury Diploma	Graffiti	Igor Apasyan	Russia
Armenian Panorama Competition	Jury Diploma	Seven Indian Boys	Ashot Mkrtchyan	Armenia
Parajanov’s Thaler - Lifetime Achievement Award			Paolo and Vittorio Taviani	Italy
FIPRESCI Award		A Story of People in War and Peace	Vardan Hovhannisyan	Armenia
Ecumenical Jury Awards		A Story of People in War and Peace	Vardan Hovhannisyan	Armenia
Ecumenical Jury Awards		Screamers	Carla Garapedian	United Kingdom
Wishing-Tree Prize		Dinner Time	Gor Baghdasaryan	Armenia

== See also ==
- Golden Apricot Yerevan International Film Festival
- Atom Egoyan
- Serge Avedikian
- Bruno Dumont
- Leos Carax
- Carla Garapedian
- Lee Chang-dong
- Andrey Zvyagintsev
- Vardan Hovhannisyan
- Cinema of Armenia
- 2007 in film
