= 7th Yerevan Golden Apricot International Film Festival =

- Location: Yerevan, Armenia
- Festival date: July 11–18, 2010
- Website: http://www.gaiff.am/en/

Yerevan Golden Apricot International Film Festival
- 8th 6th

The 7th Yerevan Golden Apricot International Film Festival was a film festival held in Yerevan, Armenia from July 11 to 18, 2010.

This edition of the festival was dedicated to the anniversaries Arni Verno and Atom Egoyan. Other filmmakers who presented their films at the festival were Theodoros Angelopoulos and Fatih Akın.

== About the Golden Apricot Yerevan International Film Festival ==
The Golden Apricot Yerevan International Film Festival (GAIFF) (Armenian: «Ոսկե Ծիրան» Երևանի միջազգային կինոփառատոն) is an annual film festival held in Yerevan, Armenia. The festival was founded in 2004 with the co-operation of the “Golden Apricot” Fund for Cinema Development, the Armenian Association of Film Critics and Cinema Journalists. The GAIFF is continually supported by the Ministry of Foreign Affairs of the RA, the Ministry of Culture of the RA and the Benevolent Fund for Cultural Development.The objectives of the festival are "to present new works by the film directors and producers in Armenia and foreign cinematographers of Armenian descent and to promote creativity and originality in the area of cinema and video art".

== Awards GAIFF 2010 ==
Category	Award	Film	Director	Country
International Feature Competition	Golden Apricot for Best Feature Film	Cosmos	Reha Erdem	Turkey, Bulgaria
International Feature Competition	Silver Apricot Special Prize for Feature Film	My Joy	Sergei Loznitsa	Ukraine, Germany, Netherlands
International Documentary Competition	Golden Apricot for Best Documentary Film	Together	Pavel Kostomarov	Russia
International Documentary Competition	Silver Apricot Special Prize for Documentary Film	The Woman With Five Elephants	Vadim Jendreyko	Germany, Switzerland
Armenian Panorama Competition	Golden Apricot for Best Armenian Film	The Last Tightrope Dancer in Armenia	Arman Yeritsyan, Inna Sahakyan	Armenia
Armenian Panorama Competition	Silver Apricot Special Prize for Armenian Film	Down Here	Comes Chahbazian	Belgium, France
Armenian Panorama Competition	Jury Special Mention	Uncle Valya	Nikolay Davtyan	Armenia
Parajanov’s Thaler - Tribute to			Henri Verneuil	Armenia, France
Parajanov’s Thaler - Lifetime Achievement Award"			Theodoros Angelopoulos	Greece
Parajanov’s Thaler - Lifetime Achievement Award"			Claudia Cardinale	Italy
Special Prize "Master"			Claire Denis	France
Special Prize "Master"			Fridrik Thor Fridriksson	Iceland
Special Prize "Master"			Lee Chang-dong	South Korea
Special Prize "Master"			Stanislav Govorukhin	Russia
FIPRESCI Award		On the Path	Jasmila Žbanić	Bosnia and Herzegovina, Austria, Croatia, Germany
Ecumenical Jury Award		Don’t Look in the Mirror	Suren Babayan	Armenia
Jury Diploma		How I Ended This Summer	Aleksei Popogrebsky	Russia
British Council Award		Lernavan	Marat Sargsyan	Lithuania
Hrant Matevosyan Award		Lernavan	Marat Sargsyan	Lithuania

== See also ==
- Golden Apricot Yerevan International Film Festival
- Atom Egoyan
- 2010 in film
