= 2nd Yerevan Golden Apricot International Film Festival =

2005 film festival in Yerevan, Armenia

- Location: Yerevan, Armenia
- Festival date: 12 – 17 July 2005
- Website: http://www.gaiff.am/en/

Yerevan Golden Apricot International Film Festival
- 3rd 1st

The 2nd Yerevan Golden Apricot International Film Festival was a film festival held in Yerevan, Armenia from 12–17 July 2005. Entries were submitted from 45 countries such as Russia, Argentina, the Netherlands, Afghanistan, Malaysia, Chile, Turkey, Finland, India, Israel, Iran and Canada. Following the selection, 144 films from 37 countries were included into competition and non-competition programs. Included amongst the guests and participants were some of the most highly acclaimed figures of world cinema such as Abbas Kiarostami, Krzysztof Zanussi, and Nikita Mikhalkov who were given Lifetime Achievement Awards. The main prizewinners of the 2nd Golden Apricot Festival were Alexander Sokurov, Russia, with his film The Sun (Feature Film Competition), Pirjo Honkasalo, Finland, with The 3 Rooms of Melancholia (Documentary Competition), and Arman Yeritsyan, Armenia, with Under the Open Sky (Armenian Panorama Competition).

== About the Golden Apricot Yerevan International Film Festival ==
The Golden Apricot Yerevan International Film Festival (GAIFF) (Armenian: «Ոսկե Ծիրան» Երևանի միջազգային կինոփառատոն) is an annual film festival held in Yerevan, Armenia. The festival was founded in 2004 with the co-operation of the “Golden Apricot” Fund for Cinema Development, the Armenian Association of Film Critics and Cinema Journalists. The GAIFF is continually supported by the Ministry of Foreign Affairs of the RA, the Ministry of Culture of the RA and the Benevolent Fund for Cultural Development.The objectives of the festival are "to present new works by the film directors and producers in Armenia and foreign cinematographers of Armenian descent and to promote creativity and originality in the area of cinema and video art".

== Awards GAIFF 2005 ==
Category	Award	Film	Director	Country
International Feature Competition	Golden Apricot for Best Feature Film	The Sun	Aleksandr Sokurov	Russia, Italy, Switzerland, France
International Feature Competition	Silver Apricot Special Prize for Feature Film	4	Ilya Khrzhanovsky	Russia
International Feature Competition	Silver Apricot Special Prize for Feature Film	Los Muertos (The Dead)	Lisandro Alonso	Argentina, Netherlands, France
International Feature Competition	Jury Special Mention	Paradise Girls	Fow Pyng Hu	Netherlands
International Documentary Competition	Golden Apricot for Best Documentary Film	3 Rooms Of Melancholia	Pirjo Honkasalo	Finland, Sweden, Denmark, Germany
International Documentary Competition	Silver Apricot Special Prize for Documentary Film	Moskatchka	Annett Schutz	Latvia, Germany
International Documentary Competition	Silver Apricot Special Prize for Documentary Film	Oh! Man	Yervant Gianikian, Angela Ricci Lucchi	Italy
Armenian Panorama Competition	Golden Apricot for Best Armenian Film	Hammer & Flame	Von (Vahan) Pilikian	United Kingdom
Armenian Panorama Competition	Golden Apricot for Best Armenian Film	Under the Open Sky	Arman Yeritsyan	Armenia
Armenian Panorama Competition	Golden Apricot for Best Armenian Film	The Road	Naira Muradyan	Armenia
Armenian Panorama Competition	Jury Diploma	Born in Fire	Suren Ter-Grigoryan	Armenia
Armenian Panorama Competition	Jury Diploma	Planet Zorthian	Arno Yeretzian, Sevag Vrej, Harout Arakelian, Lisa Tchakmakian	United States
Armenian Panorama Competition	Jury Diploma	One Balloon	Aram Hekinian, Aruna Naimji	United States
Armenian Panorama Competition	Jury Diploma	One Fine Morning (Un Beau Matin)	Serge Avedikian	France
Parajanov’s Thaler - Lifetime Achievement Award			Abbas Kiarostami	Iran
Parajanov’s Thaler - Lifetime Achievement Award			Krzysztof Zanussi	Poland
Parajanov’s Thaler - Lifetime Achievement Award			Nikita Mikhalkov	Russia
Prize of the Armenian Filmmakers Union for the Best Director		Long Gone (Documentary)	Jack Cahil	United States
Prizes of the Armenian Association of Film Critics and Cinema Journalists for the Best Feature Film		My Father Is an Engineer	Robert Guediguian	France
Prizes of the Armenian Association of Film Critics and Cinema Journalists for the Best Feature Film		Waiting for the Clouds	Yesim Ustaoglu	Turkey
Hrant Matevosyan Fund Prix for the Best Script in Armenian Panorama		The Road	Naira Muradyan	Armenia

== See also ==
- Golden Apricot Yerevan International Film Festival
- Serge Avedikian
- Atom Egoyan
- Abbas Kiarostami
- Krzysztof Zanussi
- Nikita Mikhalkov
- Cinema of Armenia
- 2005 in film
