= 6th Yerevan Golden Apricot International Film Festival =

2009 film festival edition

- Location: Yerevan, Armenia
- Festival date: 12 – 19 July 2009
- Website: http://www.gaiff.am/en/

Yerevan Golden Apricot International Film Festival
- 7th 5th

The 6th Yerevan Golden Apricot International Film Festival was a film festival held in Yerevan, Armenia from 12–19 July 2009. The annual festival had over 450 submissions from 67 countries, 150 of which were included into the competition and non-competition programs. Over 250 accredited press representatives (foreign and local) covered the festival. This was the fourth year the festival was widely covered by Euronews. Among honorable guests were filmmakers Rob Nilsson (United States), Kohei Oguri (Japan), Alexander Rodnyansky (Russia), Sergei Solovyov (Russia), actors Eric Bogosian (United States), Arsinee Khanjian (Canada) and producer Alain Terzian. The international juries, headed by Kohei Oguri, Alexander Rodnyansky, Haig Balian (Netherlands) awarded the following prizes: Golden Apricot 2009 for the Best Feature Film to George Ovashvili for his film The Other Bank (Georgia); Golden Apricot 2009 for the Best Documentary Film to Anders Østergaard for his film Burma VJ - Reporting from a Closed Country (Denmark), and Golden Apricot 2009 for the Best Film in the “Armenian Panorama” to With Love and Gratitude by Arka Manukyan (Armenia). The FIPRESCI Award went to Ozcan Alper’s Autumn and the Ecumenical Award to George Ovashvili’s The Other Bank.

== About the Golden Apricot Yerevan International Film Festival ==
The Golden Apricot Yerevan International Film Festival (GAIFF) (Armenian: «Ոսկե Ծիրան» Երևանի միջազգային կինոփառատոն) is an annual film festival held in Yerevan, Armenia. The festival was founded in 2004 with the co-operation of the “Golden Apricot” Fund for Cinema Development, the Armenian Association of Film Critics and Cinema Journalists. The GAIFF is continually supported by the Ministry of Foreign Affairs of the RA, the Ministry of Culture of the RA and the Benevolent Fund for Cultural Development.The objectives of the festival are "to present new works by the film directors and producers in Armenia and foreign cinematographers of Armenian descent and to promote creativity and originality in the area of cinema and video art".

== Awards GAIFF 2009 ==
Category	Award	Film	Director	Country
International Feature Competition	Golden Apricot for Best Feature Film	The Other Bank	George Ovashvili	(Georgia (country)) Georgia, Kazakhstan
International Feature Competition	Silver Apricot Special Prize for Feature Film	Scratch	Michał Rosa	Poland
International Feature Competition	Jury Diploma	Autumn	Özcan Alper	Turkey, Germany
International Documentary Competition	Golden Apricot for Best Documentary Film	Burma VJ - Reporting from a Closed Country	Anders Østergaard	Denmark
International Documentary Competition	Silver Apricot Special Prize for Documentary Film	The Living	Sergey Bukovsky	Ukraine
International Documentary Competition	Jury Special Mention	Supermen of Malegaon	Faiza Ahmad Khan	India, Singapore, Japan
Armenian Panorama Competition	Golden Apricot for Best Armenian Film	With Love and Gratitude	Arka Manukyan	Armenia
Armenian Panorama Competition	Jury Diploma	Caucasian Niece	Levon Kalantar	Armenia
Armenian Panorama Competition	Jury Diploma	A World of Our Own	Frédéric Balekdjian	France
Special Prize "Master"			Kohei Oguri	Japan
Special Prize "Master"			Rob Nilsson	United States
Special Prize "Master"			Sergei Solovyov	Russia
FIPRESCI Award		Autumn	Özcan Alper	Turkey, Germany
Ecumenical Jury Award		The Other Bank	George Ovashvili	(Georgia (country)) Georgia, Kazakhstan

== See also ==
- Golden Apricot Yerevan International Film Festival
- Atom Egoyan
- George Ovashvili
- Michał Rosa
- Özcan Alper
- Cinema of Armenia
- 2009 in film
