= 3rd Yerevan Golden Apricot International Film Festival =

Film festival

3rd Golden Apricot Yerevan International Film Festival
- Location: Yerevan, Armenia
- Festival date: 10 – 15 July 2006
- Website: http://www.gaiff.am/en/

Golden Apricot Yerevan International Film Festival
- 4th 2nd

The 3rd Golden Apricot Yerevan International Film Festival was a film festival held in Yerevan, Armenia from 10–15 July 2006. The annual festival presented about 120 films from 43 countries. Participants included some of the most highly acclaimed figures of world cinema - such as Marco Bellocchio, Tonino Guerra, Mohsen Makhmalbaf, Godfrey Reggio and Artavazd Peleshyan, who were honored with Lifetime Achievement Awards. More than 110 foreign guests attended the festival, which included filmmakers, actors, producers and distributors. The festival was covered by a number of international media, including Euronews and Arte. The international juries, headed by Moritz de Hadeln (Feature Competition), Godfrey Reggio (Documentary Competition) and Arsinee Khanjian (Armenian Panorama), awarded the following prizes: Golden Apricot 2006 for the Best Feature Film to Hou Hsiao-hsien for his film Three Times, (Taiwan/China/France); Golden Apricot 2006 for the Best Documentary Film to Workingman's Death by Michael Glawogger, (Austria); and Golden Apricot 2006 for the Best Film in "Armenian Panorama" to The Dwellers of Forgotten Islands by Hrant Hakobyan, (Armenia).

== About the Golden Apricot Yerevan International Film Festival ==
The Golden Apricot Yerevan International Film Festival (GAIFF) (Armenian: «Ոսկե Ծիրան» Երևանի միջազգային կինոփառատոն) is an annual film festival held in Yerevan, Armenia. The festival was founded in 2004 with the co-operation of the “Golden Apricot” Fund for Cinema Development, the Armenian Association of Film Critics and Cinema Journalists. The GAIFF is continually supported by the Ministry of Foreign Affairs of the RA, the Ministry of Culture of the RA and the Benevolent Fund for Cultural Development.The objectives of the festival are "to present new works by the film directors and producers in Armenia and foreign cinematographers of Armenian descent and to promote creativity and originality in the area of cinema and video art".

== Awards GAIFF 2006 ==
Category	Award	Film	Director	Country
International Feature Competition	Golden Apricot for Best Feature Film	Three Times	Hou Hsiao-hsien	Taiwan, China, France
International Feature Competition	Silver Apricot Special Prize for Feature Film	The Legend of Time	Isaki Lacuesta	Spain
International Feature Competition	Silver Apricot Special Prize for Feature Film	Trip To Armenia (Le voyage en Arménie)	Robert Guédiguian	France
International Documentary Competition	Golden Apricot for Best Documentary Film	Workingman's Death	Michael Glawogger	Austria
International Documentary Competition	Silver Apricot Special Prize for Documentary Film	Estamira	Marcos Prado	Brazil
International Documentary Competition	Jury Special Mention	Ljudmila & Anatolij	Gunnar Bergdahl	Sweden
Armenian Panorama Competition	Golden Apricot for Best Armenian Film	The Dwellers of Forgotten Islands	Hrant Hakobyan	Armenia
Jury Special Mention	Posthumous Lifetime Achievement Award		Ara Vahuni	Armenia
Parajanov’s Thaler - Lifetime Achievement Award			Artavazd Peleshyan	Armenia
Parajanov’s Thaler - Lifetime Achievement Award			Marko Bellocchio	Italy
Parajanov’s Thaler - Lifetime Achievement Award			Antonio Guerra	Italy
Parajanov’s Thaler - Lifetime Achievement Award			Mohsen Makhmalbaf	Iran
Parajanov’s Thaler - Lifetime Achievement Award			Godfrey Reggio	United States
Awards for Emerging Filmmakers		The Genocide in Me	Araz Artinyan	Canada
Awards for Emerging Filmmakers		My Name is Happiness	Vardan Hakobyan	Russia
Awards for Emerging Filmmakers		The Lighthouse	Maria Sahakyan	Russia, Armenia
Armenian Association of Film Critics and Cinema Journalists Prize		Summer in Berlin	Andreas Dresen	Germany
Armenian Association of Film Critics and Cinema Journalists Prize		Returner	Serge Avedikian	France

== See also ==
- Atom Egoyan
- Serge Avedikian
- Andreas Dresen
- Artavazd Peleshyan
- Mohsen Makhmalbaf
- Godfrey Reggio
- Cinema of Armenia
- 2006 in film
