= 1st Yerevan Golden Apricot International Film Festival =

2004 film festival in Yerevan, Armenia

- Location: Yerevan, Armenia
- Festival date: June 30–July 4, 2004
- Website: www.gaiff.am/en/

Yerevan Golden Apricot International Film Festival
- 2nd

The 1st Yerevan Golden Apricot International Film Festival was a film festival held in Yerevan, Armenia from June 30 to July 4, 2004. The festival attracted attention from all over the world while including 148 films representing over 70 filmmakers from 20 countries. Grand Prizes of the first Golden Apricot festival went to Atom Egoyan (Feature Film Competition), Stephane Elmadjian (Short Film and Experimental) and Armen Khachatryan (Documentary).

== About the Golden Apricot Yerevan International Film Festival ==
The Golden Apricot Yerevan International Film Festival (GAIFF) (Armenian: «Ոսկե Ծիրան» Երևանի միջազգային կինոփառատոն) is an annual film festival held in Yerevan, Armenia. The festival was founded in 2004 with the co-operation of the “Golden Apricot” Fund for Cinema Development, the Armenian Association of Film Critics and Cinema Journalists. The GAIFF is continually supported by the Ministry of Foreign Affairs of the RA, the Ministry of Culture of the RA and the Benevolent Fund for Cultural Development.The objectives of the festival are "to present new works by the film directors and producers in Armenia and foreign cinematographers of Armenian descent and to promote creativity and originality in the area of cinema and video art".

== Awards GAIFF 2004 ==
Category	Award	Film	Director	Country
International Feature Competition	Golden Apricot for Best Feature Film	Ararat	Atom Egoyan	Canada
International Documentary Competition	Golden Apricot for Best Documentary Film	Tale About Pegasus (Armenian: Հեքիաթ թեվավոր ձիու մասին)	Armen Khachatryan	Armenia
Short Film Competition	Golden Apricot for Best Short Film	Je m'appelle	Stéphane Elmadjian	France
Animation and Experimental Film	Golden Apricot for Best Armenian Film	Freedub 1	Stéphane Elmadjian	France
Jury Special Prize	Jury Special Prize for Best Feature Film	A Place in the World	Artour Aristakisian	Russia
Jury Special Prize	Jury Special Prize for Best Animation and Experimental Film	Ligne de Vie	Serge Avedikian	France
Special Mention	Special Mention for Best Documentary Film	I Died in Childhood...	Georgiy Paradzhanov	Russia

== See also ==
- Golden Apricot Yerevan International Film Festival
- Atom Egoyan
- Cinema of Armenia
- 2004 in film
