= Wonderful Town (disambiguation) =

Wonderful Town is a 1953 Broadway musical.

Wonderful Town may also refer to:

- Wonderful Town (film), a 2007 Thai film written and directed by Aditya Assarat
- Faye Emerson's Wonderful Town, a variety television series that aired on CBS from 1951 to 1952
