= Mariya Saakyan =

Russian film director and screenwriter

- Born: Mariya Sergeevna Saakyan; 24 July 1980; Yerevan, Armenian SSR, Soviet Union
- Died: 28 January 2018 (aged 37); Moscow, Russia
- Occupation(s): film director, screenwriter
- Years active: 2004–2018
- Children: 5

Maria Sergeevna Saakyan (Russian: Мария Сергеевна Саакян, Armenian: Մարիա Սերգեյի Սահակյան, 24 July 1980 – 28 January 2018) was a Russian film director, screenwriter, animator and editor. She is known for her work in movies like Farewell, Mayak, Honey Money among others.

== Biography ==
Saakyan was born in 1980 in Yerevan. She is the granddaughter of the Armenian poet Seda Vermisheva. In 1993, she moved to Moscow with her family. In 1996, she entered the Gerasimov Institute of Cinematography, faculty of directing film and television, the workshop of Vladimir Kobrin.

Saakyan filmed the short film "Farewell", a thesis at the end of VGIK in 2003. The film is shown in the program at the International Film Festival in Oberhausen, the International Film Festival "Premier Plans Angers" in France, the official program of the Rotterdam Film Festival in the Netherlands, at the Telluride Film Festival and others. She was awarded the Grand Prix of the Golden Apricot Yerevan International Film Festival, a special mention of the International Film Festival in the city of Fano, received a prize from the Kodak company at the VGIK festival and a diploma of the St. Anna Festival.

== Personal life and death ==
Saakyan was the mother of five children, her husband was Jeff Kalousdian, an American of Armenian descent. She died of cancer on 28 January 2018.

== Filmography ==
Director

- 2004 - Farewell (short film)
- 2006 - "The Lighthouse" - Mayak (film)
- 2012 - "It's Not Me"
- 2012 - "Entropy"
- 2013 - "Garlic, onions and peppers"

Screenwriter

- 2004 - Farewell
- 2012 - “It's Not Me”

Editor

- 2004 - Farewell
- 2012 - “It's Not Me”
- 2012 - Entropy
- 2015 - "Honey Money"
