= Toutes griffes dehors =

- Directed by: Michel Boisrond
- Starring: Sophie Desmarets; Serge Avedikian; Jany Holt
- Country of origin: France
- No. of episodes: 6

Production
- Running time: 52 min

Original release
- Network: Antenne 2
- Release: 1982 – 1982

Toutes griffes dehors is a 1982 French television serial directed by Michel Boisrond, and starring Sophie Desmarets and Serge Avedikian. It was broadcast on channel Antenne 2, now France 2, for six episodes starting on 22 October 1982.

== Cast ==
- Sophie Desmarets as Fanny
- Serge Avedikian as Gilles Dautun
- Jany Holt as Mlle Monelle
- Jacques François as Alain
- Pierre Tornade as Barbazan
- Claudia Demarmels as Bénédicte
- Christian Marin as Bob Loiseau
- Blanchette Brunoy as Francine
- Gérard Hernandez as Simonès
- Maria Sebaldt as Monique
- François Perrot as M. Merlin
- Marco Perrin as Uncle Fernand
- Patricia Elig as Josyane
- Marc Bassler as Jean-Claude
- Marie-Noëlle Eusèbe as Toura
- Sylvie Granotier as Lorraine
- Charlotte Maury-Sentier as Zouzou
- Luc Florian as Mourad
- Walter Buschhoff as M. Azam
- Roland Oberlin as Didier
- Carolin Ohrner as Gwendoline
- Fred Personne as M. Cuvier
- Jacques Sereys as Lionel Desforges
- Catherine Jacob
- Hélène Duc
- Jeanne Herviale
- Isabelle Mergault
- Jean-Roger Milo
- Robert Rollis
