= Susanna Harutyunyan =

Armenian writer

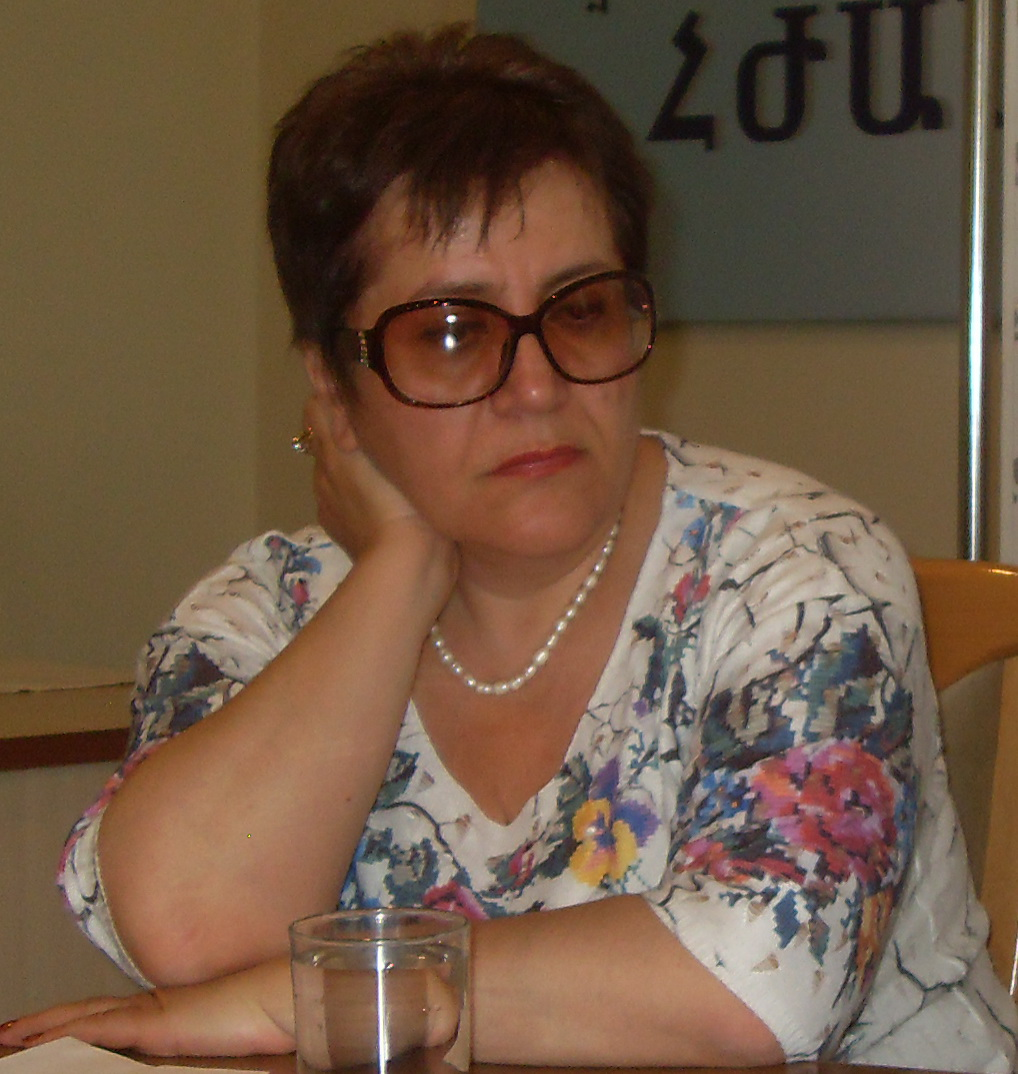
- Born: February 15, 1963 (age 63); Karchaghbyur, Armenian SSR, USSR
- Occupation: writer
- Writing career
- Genre: novels

Susanna Harutyunyan (Armenian: Սուսաննա Հարությունյան; born February 15, 1963) is an Armenian writer and the author of eight novels. In 2016 she won the Presidential Award for Literature.

== Life ==
Harutyunyan was born in Karchaghbyur in 1963 and began to write at the age of ten, achieving some publications.

She started to write fiction in 1988, but she says that her work became more serious ten years later, after her children had grown up. She avoids long descriptions as she wants her reader to be a partner in creating the story. After writing eight novels, including Map Without Land and Waters, her work has been translated into Persian, Greek, Romanian, Azerbaijani, German, Kazakh, Spanish, and English.

Harutyunyan organized the Kayaran group of writers and is the editor of the literary journal Kayaran. and she also writes short stories.

In 2016 she won the Presidential Award for Literature for her novel Ravens before Noah., which had been translated into English in 2011. Her play The Harmony was translated into Persian and performed in Iran. In 2018 she was the director of the Yerevan Golden Apricot International Film Festival.

Her work is firmly based on facts. In one of her stories, God Has Been Here, she included a girl who glowed in the dark and had a build up of phosphorus in her body. Harutyunyan remembers her and the people who visited her. She feels that Armenian writers do not travel as much as they should due to financial reasons. In fact, authors are forced to guess the reaction of European readers toward their work because writers do not meet enough of their peers.
