= WebApricot Pan-Armenian Film Festival =

Armenian online film festival

- Location: Armenia
- Founded: 2011
- Founded by: Yerevan International Film Festival and Webtv.am Internet Channel
- Language: Armenian
- Website: webtv.am

WebApricot Pan-Armenian Film Festival (Armenian: WebԾիրան համահայկական օնլայն կինոփառատոն) is the first pan-Armenian online film festival founded in 2011 by Golden Apricot International Film Festival (IFF) and Webtv.am Internet Channel. Armenian filmmakers from Armenia and abroad can take part in the festival.

== History ==
=== WebApricot 2011 ===
WebApricot was established in 2011 as a collaboration between the Golden Apricot International Film Festival (IFF) and Webtv.am Internet Channel. The inaugural festival took place from November 25 to December 25, 2011. To determine the winners, online voting was conducted on the Webtv.am website as well as on the popular social network, Facebook.

The competition welcomed films of any genre, with a maximum duration of 20 minutes, and there were no restrictions on the technical methods employed in their creation. Two prizes were up for grabs: the Grand Prize valued at $1,000 and an Incentive Prize valued at $500.

The film Աշնան արև ("Autumn Sun") directed by Diana Kardumyan emerged as the recipient of the Grand Prize. Additionally, the film "Crossroads of Fate" (Հատվող ճակատագրերի հանգրվանը) directed by Arsen Hayrapetyan was awarded the Incentive Prize. Notably, several films received honorable mentions for their remarkable contributions, including "A Light Touch" (Թեթև հպում) directed by Nare Mkrtchyan, "Nakhshoy School" (Նախշոյի դպրոցը) directed by Gohar Khachatryan, "Another Frunzik" (Էն ուրիշ Ֆրունզիկը) directed by Hovhannes Papikyan, "Help Them Now" (Օգնիր նրանց հիմա) directed by ArtNerses, and "Bye-Bye" directed by Areg Mkrtchyan, Hrayr Lazyan, and Ashot Harutyunyan.

=== WebApricot 2012 ===
The 2nd edition of the Pan-Armenian online film festival, "WebApricot," took place from November 1 to 30, 2012.

Vardan Danielyan's documentary film, "Strawberry Fields" (Էսքիզներ Ոսկեվազի դաշտերից), emerged as the winner of the main prize, as determined by the esteemed jury. The film was commended for its artistic reinterpretation of reality, skillfully adhering to the principles of classical documentary filmmaking.

The second prize was awarded to Ashot Hovsepyan's documentary film, "Beard" (Մորուք), which shed light on the life of a man facing challenging social circumstances. The film was lauded for its portrayal of resilience and the exploration of the human spirit.

The third prize was shared between Andranik Harutyunyan's feature film, "Zakat" (Զակատ), and Samvel Seyranyan's documentary, "Armenian Elderly" (Հայ տարեցը). Both films received recognition for their outstanding contributions to their respective genres.

Additionally, Arshak Zakaryan's film, "Woman" (Կինը), garnered the "Sympathy" incentive award and a special diploma for receiving the highest number of views.

=== WebApricot 2013 ===
The third installment of the online film festival took place from December 10, 2013, to February 23, 2014. This edition of the festival introduced a longer film length of up to 30 minutes.

Nikolay Hovhannisyan's "Shadow" (Ստվեր) claimed the first prize. Vruyr Simonyan's "Giving" (Նվիրում) secured the second prize. The third prize was awarded to Alen Manukyan's "Resurrection" (Հարություն). Nara Karapetyan's "Waiting" (Սպասում) received the "Sympathy of the Audience" award.

=== WebApricot 2014 ===
The fourth edition of WebApricot commenced on November 18, 2014, and concluded on February 25, 2015.

The coveted main prize was bestowed upon the film "The Girl on the Moon" (Աղջիկը լուսնի վրա), directed by Aren Malakyan and Martin Hovhannisyan, with production by Edgar Bagdasaryan. Nahapet Sargsyan's film, "Echo" (Էխո), featuring Vahe Terteryan as the cinematographer, was awarded the first consolation prize. Andranik Harutyunyan's "Carpets" (Գորգեր), with Gabriel Mirakyan as the cinematographer, received the second honorable mention. Ani Hakobyan was awarded the "Sympathy" award for her film, "The Message" (Ուղերձ).

=== WebApricot 2015 ===
The fifth WebApricot festival ran from February 3 to March 3, 2015. First prize went was shared by Lusine Papoyan's "Radiola" and Garik Avagyan's “I heard a sweet voice…”. “I wanted a studio” by Arpi Balyan received an incentive award and Arman Ayvazyan won the Audience award for “Crossroad”.

=== WebApricot 2017 ===
For the 2017 festival, the Ministry of Culture of the Republic of Armenia allocated a special prize, which went to “The Road” by Angela Frangyan. The main prize went to Naira Muradyan for the animated film "Ballet". The incentive awards went to "Diana's Gift" by Martin Matevosyan and "The Frame" by Ophelia Harutyunyan. The audience award went to “Beautiful Arus” by Varuzhan Galtakyan.

== Awards categories ==
- Grand prize
- Incentive awards
- Audience award
- Special prize (started in 2017)

== Winners ==
=== Grand Prize ===
Year	Film	In Armenian	Director	Country of director (at time of film's release)
2011	Autumn Sun	Աշնան արև	Diana Kardumyan	Armenia
2012	Strawberry Fields	Էսկիզներ Ոսկեվազի դաշտերից	Vardan Danielyan	Armenia
2013	Shadow	Ստվեր	Nikolay Hovhannisyan	Armenia
2014	The Girl on the Moon	Աղջիկը լուսնի վրա	Aren Malakyan	Armenia
2016	I Heard a Sweet Voice	Ես լսեցի մի անուշ ձայն	Garik Avakian and Tigran Margaryan	Armenia
2016	Radiogram	Ռադիոլա	Lilit Papoyan	Armenia
2017	Ballet	Բալետ	Naira Muradyan	Armenia

== See also ==
- Yerevan International Film Festival
