= Dawn (1985 film) =

1985 film

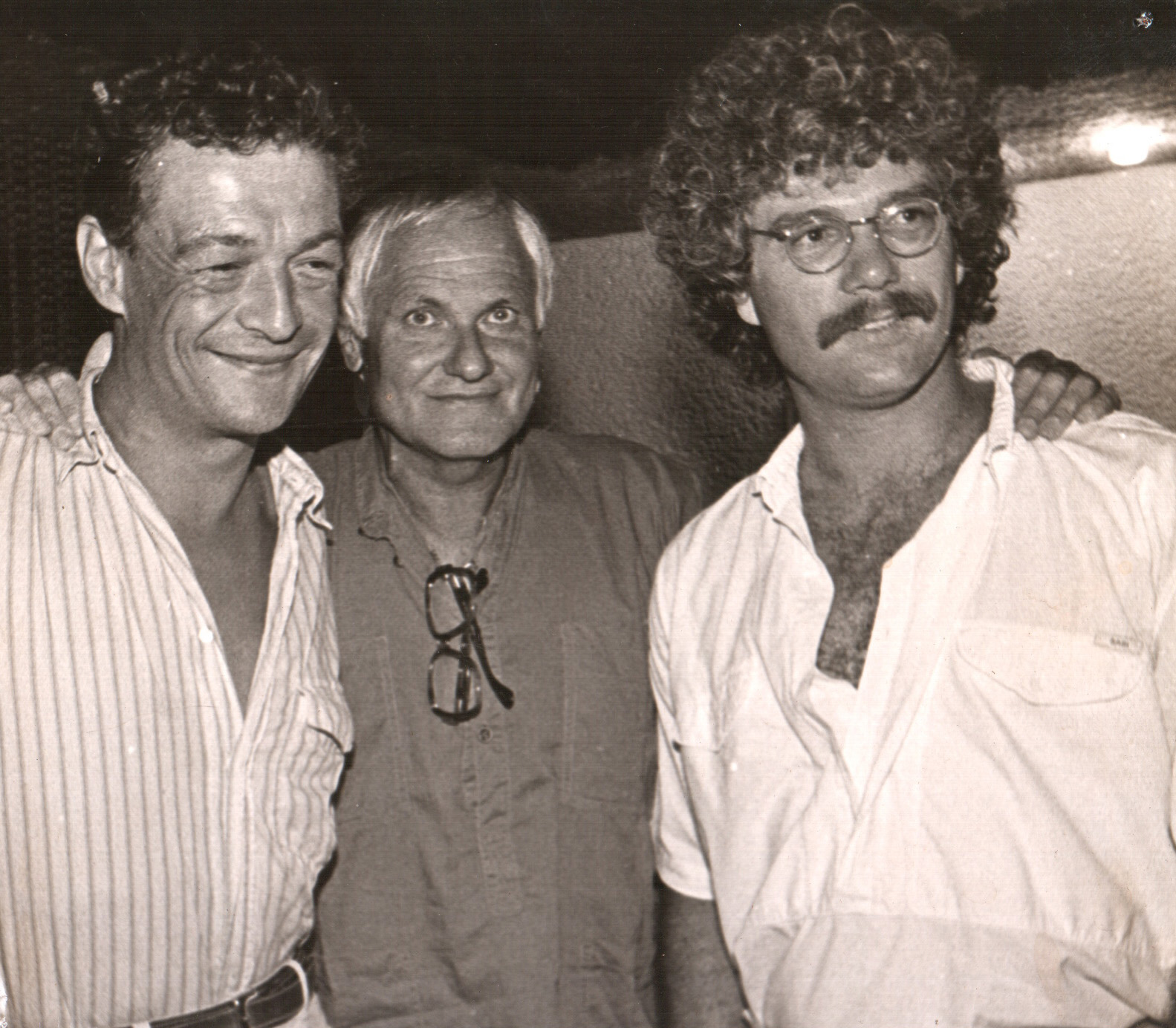
- Israeli Producer Doron Eran (right) with Hungarian Director Miklós Jancsó (middle), and French actor Philippe Léotard (left) on the set of the film "Dawn" (L'Aube) in Israel, 1985
- Directed by: Miklós Jancsó
- Written by: Miklós Jancsó; Elie Wiesel (novel Dawn)
- Produced by: Yannick Bernard
- Starring: Serge Avedikian
- Cinematography: Armand Marco
- Edited by: Jean Paul Vauban
- Release date: February 1985
- Running time: 92 minutes
- Countries: France; Hungary
- Language: French

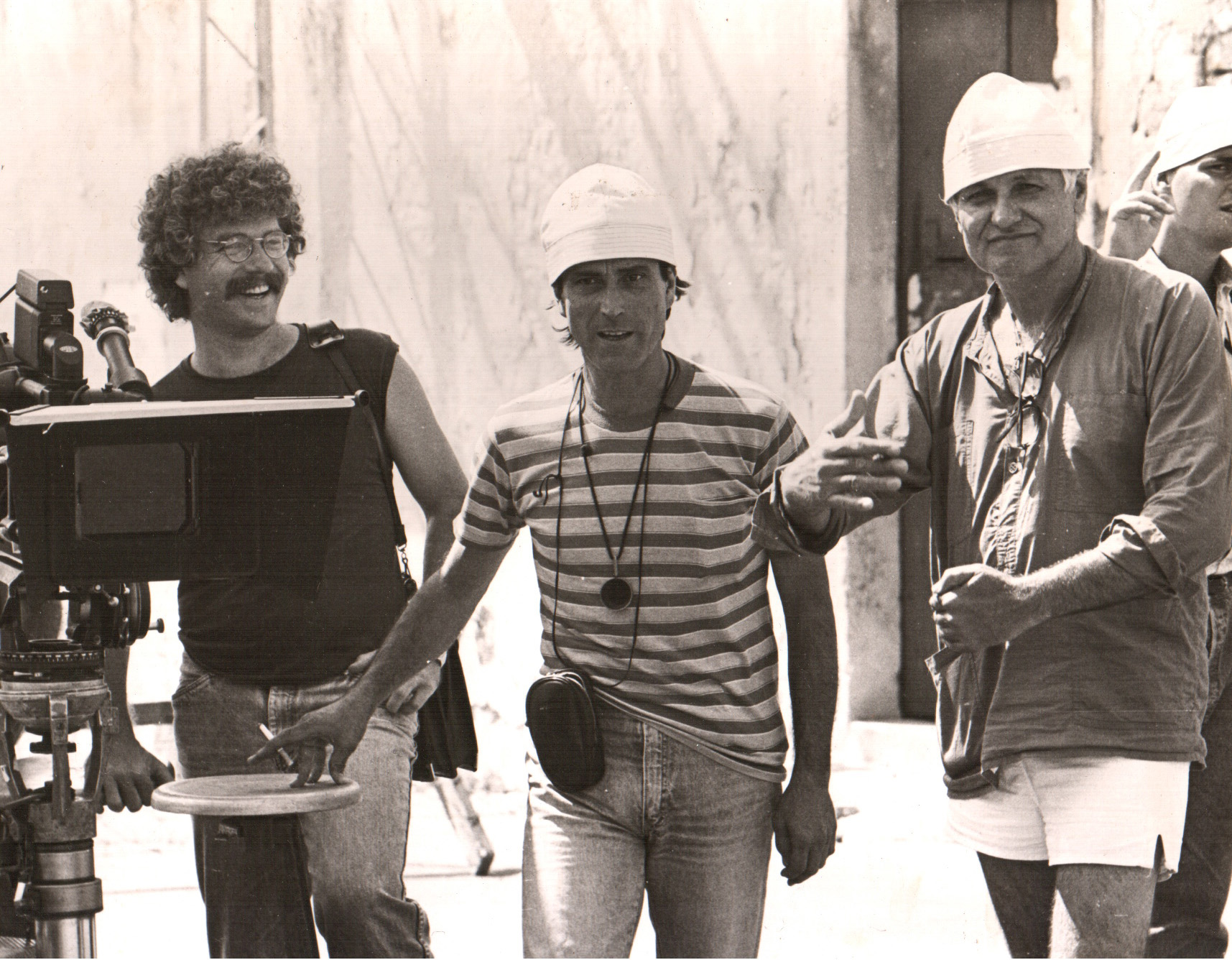
Jancsó and Léotard during filming in Israel

Dawn (French: L'Aube, Hungarian: A hajnal) is a 1985 French-Israeli co-production drama film directed by Miklós Jancsó, co-financed by the French Ministry of Culture. The film was entered into the 36th Berlin International Film Festival.

== Plot ==
Starring the British Michael York and Philip Lautard of France, "Dawn" takes place during the British Mandatory Palestine, in 1947. The story follows the life of a young man, a Jewish Holocaust survivor named Elisha, who is guarding a British prisoner one night in order to execute him at dawn. This is in retaliation for the killing of the members of the Jewish underground. The story is based on The Sergeants affair, the abduction of two British Sergeants by the Irgun and their hanging in a grove in Netanya.

== Cast ==
- Serge Avedikian
- Paul Blain
- Christine Boisson as Llana
- Philippe Léotard as Gad
- Redjep Mitrovitsa as Elisha
- Michael York as John Dawson

== See also ==
- Dawn (2014)
