= Eric Nazarian =

Armenian-American film director and screenwriter

Eric Nazarian is an Armenian-American film director and screenwriter.

== Early life ==
He was born in Armenia and moved to the United States as a child, growing up in Los Angeles. He is a graduate of the University of Southern California's School of Cinematic Arts.

Inspired by his father Haik's love of world cinema, Nazarian apprenticed at his father's photo lab where Haik taught him the fundamentals of visual storytelling through photojournalism and screenwriting. After graduating from Verdugo Hills High School, Nazarian traveled extensively, exploring the Southwest and Baja California, inspired by the photography of Robert Frank and the travelogues of Sam Shepard and John Steinbeck across America and the Sea of Cortez. With a Minolta 35mm. camera gifted to him by Haik, Nazarian photographed Southern California street cultures, immigrant communities, Los Angeles gangs and iconographies of underworld cultures pouring in from the former Soviet bloc. During his undergraduate years at USC Film School, Nazarian studied Film Production and wrote several screenplays exploring the historical and cross-cultural ties that bind Mexican-American, Armenian, Native American, Latin and African-American narratives across different periods in 20th century America. During his senior year at USC, he photographed post-war life in the Republic of Nagorno-Karabakh in the Southern Caucasus that further cemented his international storytelling passions spanning from the Near East to the U.S.

== Career ==
The Blue Hour, Nazarian's first feature film as writer-director, is composed of four stories about multiethnic working-class lives near the Los Angeles River, starring Alyssa Milano, Clarence Williams III and Emily Rios. The film's World Premiere took place at the 55th San Sebastian International Film Festival and was nominated for the Altadis-New Director's Award. The film was selected by Nanni Moretti to screen at the 25th Torino Film Festival in Turin, Italy in the Official Selection and was named "Film of the Day" by the European Network of Young Cinema. The Blue Hour premiered in the U.S. at the 10th Arpa International Film Festival where Nazarian was presented with the Best Director award. At the 5th Golden Apricot International Film Festival, "The Blue Hour" received the Golden Apricot for Best Film in the Armenian Panorama, the Ecumenical Jury Award and the Prime Minister's Award. The Blue Hour solidified his reputation as an emerging writer/director with a distinct voice.

In 2008, Nazarian won the Academy of Motion Picture Arts and Sciences prestigious Nicholl Fellowship for his screenplay, "Giants."

After receiving the Fellowship, Nazarian wrote and directed "Bolis," a short film about a descendant of an Armenian Genocide survivor in Istanbul as part of the European Union Capital of Culture Program.

"Three Christs", Nazarian's adaptation of Milton Rokeach's "The Three Christs of Ypsilanti" with director Jon Avnet premiered at the Toronto International Film Festival (TIFF), starring Richard Gere, Peter Dinklage, Julianna Margulies and Walton Goggins.

In 2025, Nazarian wrote and directed "Die Like a Man," the first installment of a rites of passage film trilogy exploring street cultures, cycles of violence and gentrification across two decades in 21st century America.
