= The First Rains of Spring =

2011 film

- Directed by: Erlan Nurmuhambetov; Shinju Sano
- Release date: 27 October 2011 (Tokyo)
- Countries: Kazakhstan; Japan

The First Rains of Spring (Japanese: 春、一番最初に降る雨) is a 2011 drama film. It is a Kazakhstani-Japanese co-production and is directed by Erlan Nurmuhambetov and Shinju Sano. The film won the Grand Prix at the Eurasia Film Festival.
