= My Joy =

2010 film

- Film poster
- Directed by: Sergei Loznitsa
- Written by: Sergei Loznitsa
- Produced by: Oleh Kokhan
- Starring: Viktor Nemets
- Cinematography: Oleg Mutu
- Edited by: Danielius Kokanauskis
- Release date: 19 May 2010 (Cannes)
- Running time: 127 minutes
- Countries: Germany; Netherlands; Ukraine
- Language: Russian

My Joy (Russian: «Счастье моё», romanized: Shchyastye moyo, German: Mein Glück, Ukrainian: «Щастя моє», romanized: Shchastia moie) is a 2010 internationally co-produced Russian-language road film directed by Sergei Loznitsa. It is set in the western regions of Russia, somewhere near Smolensk. My Joy was the first Ukrainian film ever to compete for the Palme d'Or.

== Plot ==
It is summer, and young driver Georgy takes his light truck on a trip to another town with a cargo of flour. He is stopped at a road police post by a pair of rude and corrupt policemen. While they are flirting with a woman they stopped earlier, Georgy manages to grab his papers and leave unnoticed. There, he picks up a hitchhiker, an old man who recounts to him a disturbing story: soon after World War II, while returning home from the front, a corrupt military officer brazenly robbed him by threatening him with arrest if he did not comply. He later shot the officer in retaliation. Later, when Georgy parks his truck and steps out and shortly returns, the old man has disappeared.

Later, Georgy meets an underage prostitute. He takes pity on the girl and gives her some money and food, but she is offended by his charity, insults him and leaves.

Later still, Georgy is lost in the night and decides to camp in the field until dawn. Three locals approach and try to steal from the truck, only to be stopped by Georgy. They distract him with some neutral conversation, telling him how one of their friends is a mute because someone killed his father in front of him when he was a child. Suddenly one man hits Georgy on the head with a log and he loses consciousness.

The scene shifts to the time period of World War II. Early in the war, two Soviet soldiers from a defeated unit cautiously feel their way through the occupied land in the deep German rear. They enter a lone house where a widowed teacher lives with his young son. The teacher is kind to the soldiers and provides them with much-needed food and shelter. However, the soldiers regard his pacifism and indifference towards the German invaders as treasonous, so they kill him, rob the house, and continue on their way, leaving the child to his own devices.

The scene shifts back to the present. Some time has passed. It is winter, and Georgy lives in the same house that once was the teacher's. The blow has left him feeble-minded and mute. He walks around bearded, dilapidated, with a blank stare. The woman living in the house keeps him as a sex slave while she trades his flour on the local market. A policeman approaches and tells her that Georgy and his truck are being searched for, so she had better get rid of both. Georgy is beaten by the locals and detained by the police, only to be released the next night when another inmate challenges the lone guard to a fight, beats him unconscious, and unlocks the cells.

The woman sells Georgy's truck and leaves, abandoning him in the snowcapped village. Homeless, he wanders about being driven off by the locals, until he collapses from exhaustion. He is found and picked up by the old man whom he earlier gave a ride to.

A military van comes to the village, carrying two servicemen tasked with delivering the body of a deceased soldier to his native place. Their daunting task is not made easier by the fact that one of them, an officer, suffers from delirium tremens. Unable to locate the relatives of the dead soldier, they decide to bribe some random people into signing the papers and leave the body to them. They approach the old man, who at first is suspicious but eventually agrees. However, shortly afterwards Georgy walks out of the house to find the old man dead. It is hinted that he may have been axed by the officer, who in his alcoholic delusion mistook him for someone else.

Georgy numbly grabs the old man's pistol and walks out to the road, where he is picked up by a very talkative truck driver, who rambles about the importance of not meddling in other people's affairs. Meanwhile, on the road the same two police officers from the beginning of the movie stop a police major and his wife. When they begin to write him up for a burnt-out headlight, the major attempts to bribe and intimidate them. When this fails and he turns to leave, a fistfight ensues, with the major handcuffed and brutally beaten. To produce two fake witnesses of his arrest, they stop another car, which is the truck with Georgy. They easily threaten the driver into signing the papers, but when they turn to Georgy, he stands silently. A fight breaks out, and one of the policemen pulls out an assault rifle. Georgy instantly shoots him dead, then everyone else. Still clutching the pistol, he staggers out into the dark.

== Cast ==
- Viktor Nemets as Georgy
- Olga Shuvalova as teenage prostitute
- Vlad Ivanov as Major from Moscow
- Dmitri Gotsdiner as train station Superintendent

== Production ==
The film was a co-production between Germany's Ma.ja.de, Ukraine's Sota Cinema Group and the Netherlands' Lemming Film. The film was shot in Ukraine as a condition for receiving money from the Ukrainian Ministry of Culture, but most of the 1.5 million Euro budget came from Germany. According to the director there are about 140 cuts in the whole film. Vlad Ivanov's Russian was dubbed as he is a Romanian actor.

== Reception ==
=== Russian media ===
There was a considerable outcry in Russian media over the film's purported Russophobic slant. Film director Karen Shakhnazarov claimed, that Loznitsa would like everyone living in Russia to be shot. But another Russian film director, Andrey Zvyagintsev, called My Joy the best Russian-language film of the decade.

=== Critical response ===
The film received positive reviews from film critics. My Joy has an approval rating of 90% on review aggregator website Rotten Tomatoes, based on 20 reviews, and an average rating of 7.10/10. Metacritic, which uses a weighted average, assigned the film a score of 81 out of 100, based on 8 critics, indicating "universal acclaim".

Among American reviewers, Manohla Dargis (The New York Times) referred to the movie as "suspenseful, mysterious, at times bitterly funny, consistently moving and filled with images of a Russia haunted both by ghosts and the living dead". A blurb in Sight & Sound advertises My Joy as "Ukraine’s answer to Deliverance". Village Voice (Michael Atkinson) reviewed My Joy as "a maddening vision and one of the year's must-see provocations.

=== Awards and nominations ===
The film was selected to compete for the Palme d'Or at the 2010 Cannes Film Festival in May. At the 7th Yerevan Golden Apricot International Film Festival in July, the film won the Silver Apricot Special Prize.
