= The Abode =

- Official release poster
- Directed by: Claudia La Bianca
- Written by: Andre Alves; Additional dialogue: Nick Smith
- Starring: Karmel Bortoleti; Ariadna Gonzales Medina; Teance Blackburn; Montana Cypress; Vanessa Falabella; Chris Darsow
- Music by: Marinho Nobre
- Production companies: Eagle Star Films; Cherry On Top Productions; Krygell Films
- Distributed by: Dark Star Pictures
- Release date: 2023
- Country: United States
- Language: English

The Abode is a 2023 American supernatural horror film directed by Claudia La Bianca. The screenplay was written by Andre Alves, with additional dialogues by Nick Smith. The film was produced by Alves, Karmel Bortoleti, Antonio Paz-Bezerra, and Nick Smith. It is a co-production between Eagle Star Films, Cherry On Top Productions, and Krygell Films.

In 2023, Dark Star Pictures acquired the U.S. and Canadian distribution rights to the film.

== Premise ==
In the 18th century, a pirate known as Redbeard executes a Native American tribe in a fit of rage. Nearly three hundred years later, the spirits of the victims, the pirate, and his wife are cursed to relive the night of the tragedy.

== Cast ==
- Karmel Bortoleti as Jessica
- Ariadna Gonzales Medina as Lara
- Teance Blackburn as Dr. Roberts
- Montana Cypress as Talako.
- Vanessa Falabela as Sofia
- Chris Darsow as Redbeard / Mr. Smith

== Production ==
Principal photography began in St. Augustine, Florida, in November 2021 and wrapped in March 2022, with filming taking place at several locations throughout the state.

== Release ==
A special preview screening took place in Dunkirk, New York, in April 2024, featuring a Q&A with co-producer Nick Smith.
