= A Story of People in War and Peace =

A story of peace and savary
- Directed by: Vardan Hovhannisyan
- Written by: Vardan Hovhannisyan
- Produced by: Vardan Hovhannisyan
- Cinematography: Vardan Hovhannisyan; Vahagn Ter-Hakobyan
- Edited by: Tigran Baghinyan
- Production company: Bars Media
- Release date: February 18, 2007
- Running time: 69 minutes
- Country: Armenia
- Language: Armenian

A Story of People in War and Peace is a 2007 documentary film written and directed by Armenian filmmaker and war veteran, Vardan Hovhannisyan.

Prompted by a question from his son, Hovhannisyan embarks on a journey to find his surviving trench mates from the first Nagorno-Karabakh War of the early nineties and examines the lasting effects of the war during peacetime. The documentary wrestles with the question of how to maintain dignity in the face of terror.

== Background ==
Historians cite the Karabakh war (1989–1994) as one of the first signs of the Soviet Union's collapse.

Vardan Hovhannisyan, front line journalist and former prisoner of war, lived alongside soldiers, doctors, nurses, villagers, and children caught in the conflict, capturing their immediate thoughts, impressions and last words to their families. He spent years processing his war experience before finally creating the retrospective documentary.

== Critical reception ==
He does not emphasize the political side of the conflict, but the psychological effects the war had on the young soldiers. He juxtaposes chaotic and terse frontline images of 12 years ago with panoramic shots in fixed frames of the beautiful scenery today. But all this calm is an illusion, as one soldier puts it.' –International Documentary Festival Amsterdam (IDFA).

Tribeca Film Festival Executive Director Peter Scarlet comments:

"...what the film offers is something quite remarkable: it's made by a filmmaker who covered the war at the time, and who inter-cuts his old footage with interviews he's filmed now with the surviving soldiers ... it succeeds heartbreakingly in driving home the fact that somehow we know that nothing justifies the fact of taking the precious, irreplaceable life of even a single human being."

The film has won numerous awards and has been shown in film festivals all over the world including IDFA (Amsterdam), Barcelona Film Festival, One World Film Festival (Prague), Doc Aviv (Tel Aviv), Al-Jazeera Film Festival, Zagreb Film Festival, Hot Docs (Toronto), Belfast Film Festival and Tribeca Film Festival (NY), Mexico International Film Festival (Rosarito), etc.

== Awards and nominations ==
- Tribeca Film Festival, NY - Best New Documentary Filmmaker
- IDFA - Nomination for the Joris Ivens Award at the FIPRESCI prize
- Mexico Festival - Special Jury Prize
- Trieste Film Festival - Audience award
- ZagrebDox Film Festival - Special Mention in the International competition
- Docaviv Film Festival - Special mention award
- Golden Apricot Film Festival - Best Intl. Documentary
- DOCSDF Intl Doc Film Fest in Mexico – Special mention of the jury
- Saratov Film Festival, Russia - Special mention of the jury
- Cancun Riviera Maya International Film Festival - Best Documentary
- Asia Pacific Screen Awards - nomination for Best Documentary Feature Film
- Amnesty International Film Festival - Movies that Matter Foundation Nomination
- Golden Apricot Film Festival - Silver Prize Armenian Panorama
- War Film Festival Russia – Best Documentary
