= The Last Tightrope Dancer in Armenia =

- Directed by: Inna Sahakyan, Arman Yeritsyan
- Produced by: Vardan Hovhannisyan
- Cinematography: Mkrtich Baroyan
- Edited by: Tigran Baghinyan
- Music by: Hayk Navasardyan, Davit Amalyan
- Production company: Bars Media
- Release date: November 2009 (IDFA)
- Running time: 72 minutes
- Language: Armenian

The Last Tightrope Dancer in Armenia Poster

The Last Tightrope Dancer in Armenia is a documentary by Arman Yeritsyan and Inna Sahakyan that tells the story of Zhora, 78 years old, and Knyaz, 77 years old, who were once the most celebrated tightrope dancers in Armenia.

== Festival screenings and awards ==
The film was completed in the beginning of November 2009 and started its festival life.

- IDFA 2009, November 18–28, 2009, Amsterdam, the Netherlands – Worldwide premiere
- Goteborg International Film Festival 2010, January 29-February 8, 2010, Göteborg, Sweden – Nordic premiere
- 8th Gdansk DocFilm Festival, (April 27–29, 2010, Gdansk, Poland) - Special Jury Award
- 7th Yerevan Golden Apricot International Film Festival, July 11–18, 2010, Yerevan, Armenia – Best Armenian Film
- 9th Euganea Film Festival, July 9–25, 2010, Padua, Italy - Competition Program
- Saratov sufferings International Documentary Film Festival, September 11–17, 2010, Saratov, Russia – The Best Cinematography
- "Russia" Documentary Film Festival, October 1–5, 2010, Yekaterinburg, Russia –

Best Feature Length Documentary

- XIX International Festival of Ethnological Film, October 14–18, 2010, Belgrade, Serbia, Grand Prix
- FilmFest Hamburg, September 30-October 9, 2010, Hamburg, Germany – Official selection
- DOK Leipzig 53rd International Film Festival October 18–23, Leipzig, Germany – Official selection
- 5th Pomegranate Film Festival, October 22–24, Toronto, Canada – The Best Documentary
- Listapad International Film Festival, November 5–12, Minsk, Belarus – The Best Documentary
