= Karchaghbyur =

Village in Gegharkunik, Armenia

Karchaghbyur Կարճաղբյուր
- Location within Armenia Location within Gegharkunik
- Coordinates: 40°09′50″N 45°34′20″E
- Country: Armenia
- Province: Gegharkunik
- Municipality: Vardenis

Population (2011)
  - Total: 2,337
- Time zone: UTC+4 (AMT)

Karchaghbyur (Armenian: Կարճաղբյուր) is a village in the Vardenis Municipality of the Gegharkunik province of Armenia.

== Etymology ==
The village was previously known as Gedakbulag.

== History ==
A walled settlement close to Karchaghbyur which was abandoned in the 1st century BCE, of the Persian or Hellenistic period, is being excavated.
