= Burma VJ =

2008 documentary film by Anders Østergaard

- Directed by: Anders Østergaard
- Written by: Anders Østergaard, Jan Krogsgaard
- Produced by: Lise Lense-Møller Com: Magic Hour Films Line: Cecilia Valsted Ass.: Lars Frederiksen
- Starring: The Burma VJs
- Narrated by: "Joshua"
- Cinematography: Simon Plum
- Edited by: Janus Billeskov & Thomas Papapetros
- Music by: Conny C-A Malmqvist
- Distributed by: Dogwoof Pictures (UK); Oscilloscope Laboratories (US)
- Release date: 12 November 2008 (COPDOX)
- Running time: 84 mins
- Country: Denmark
- Languages: Burmese; English
- Box office: $123,477

Burma VJ: Reporting from a Closed Country (Danish: Burma VJ - reporter i et lukket land; Burmese: ဘားမား ဗီဂျေ, romanized: bharrmarr begyaay) is a 2008 Danish documentary film directed by Anders Østergaard. It follows the Saffron Revolution against the military regime in Burma. The "VJ" in the title stands for "video journalists." Some of it was filmed on hand-held cameras. The footage was smuggled out of the country, physically or over the Internet. Other parts of it were reconstructed, which caused controversy. The Burma VJ Media collective is still active as of 2025.

== Reception ==
=== Critical response ===
Burma VJ has an approval rating of 97% on review aggregator website Rotten Tomatoes, based on 62 reviews, and an average rating of 7.69/10. The website's critical consensus states, "A powerfully visceral docu-drama highlighting the evils of censorship and the essential need for freedom of speech". It also has a score of 82 out of 100 on Metacritic, based on 13 critics, indicating "universal acclaim".

=== Awards and nominations ===
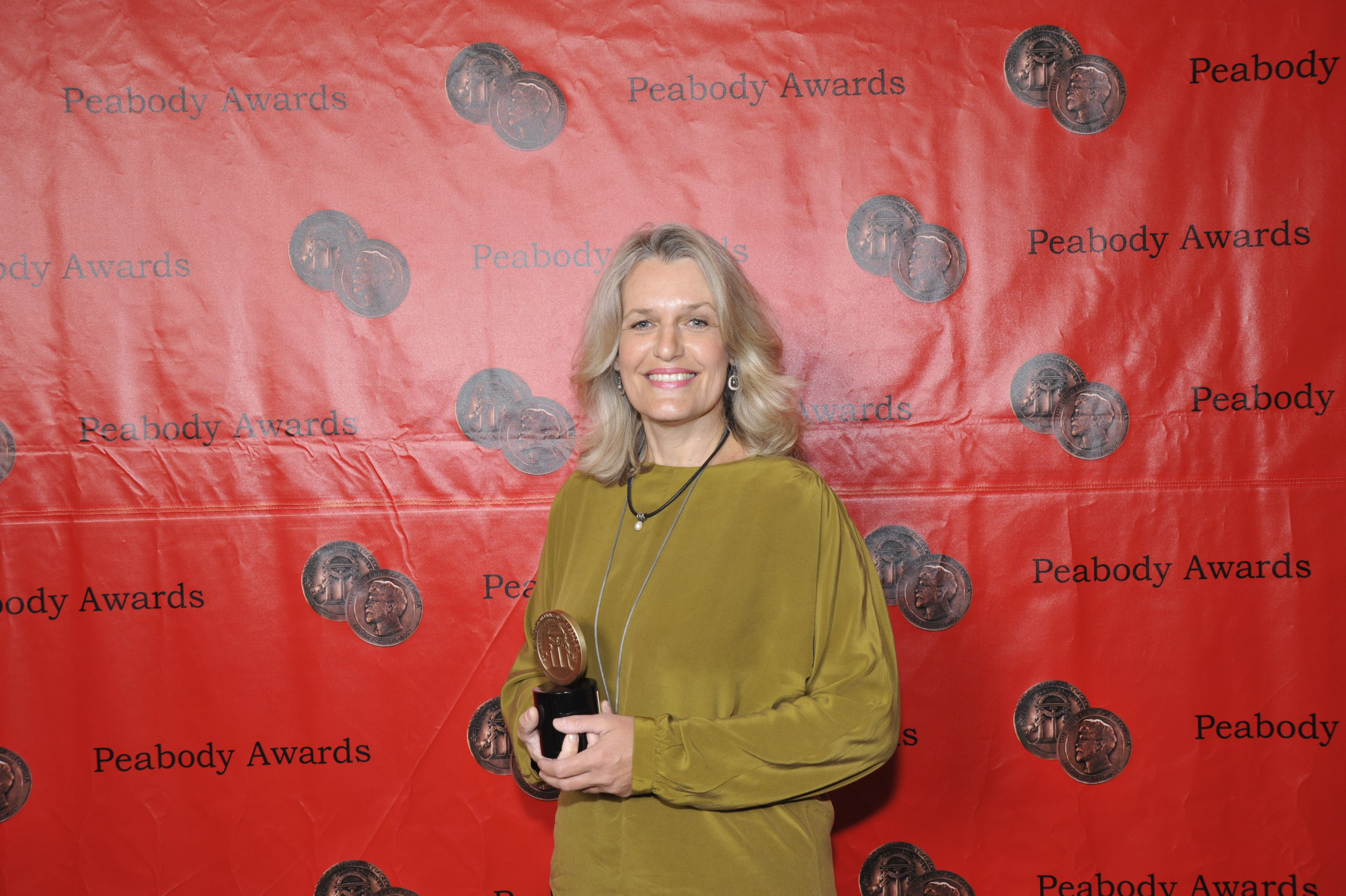
Lise Lense-Moller holding award for Burma VJ at the 70th Annual Peabody Awards

The film won awards, especially at European film festivals, e.g. it won the Golden Apricot at the 2009 Yerevan International Film Festival, Armenia, for Best Documentary Film. It won the World Cinema Documentary Film Editing Award at the Sundance Film Festival. Burma VJ was also nominated for an Academy Award for Best Documentary Feature.

== Box office ==
The film was released to one theater on 20 May 2009 and grossed $5,554 in the opening weekend. Its widest release was in three theaters. As of 1 May 2010, the total gross stands at $123,477.

== DVD features ==
The DVD includes a message from Buddhist actor Richard Gere comparing the situation in Burma to that in Tibet.

== See also ==
- 8888 Uprising
- Human rights in Burma
- Saffron Revolution
- The Lady
