= The Blue Hour (2007 film) =

- Directed by: Eric Nazarian
- Written by: Eric Nazarian
- Produced by: Brian Knappmiller; Lynnette Ramirez
- Starring: Paul Dillon; Karen Kondazian; Sarah Jones; Alyssa Milano; Baadja-Lyne Odums; Derrick O'Connor; Emily Rios; Yorick van Wageningen; Clarence Williams III; Renn Woods
- Cinematography: Sam Levy
- Edited by: Helen Hand; Emily Koonse
- Music by: Aldo Shllaku
- Production companies: Orange Bird Productions; Silver Blue Pictures; Fresco Films
- Release date: September 21, 2007 (San Sebastián International Film Festival)
- Country: United States
- Language: English
- Budget: $500,000

The Blue Hour is a 2007 American drama film directed and written by Eric Nazarian. It stars Alyssa Milano and had its world premiere at the San Sebastián International Film Festival in 2007. Additionally, the film was selected by Nanni Moretti to screen at the 2007 Torino Film Festival, in Turin, Italy.

The Blue Hour takes place in Los Angeles and follows four strangers whose lives cross paths, unaware of the ties that bind them together.

== Plot ==
Several strangers in Los Angeles weave their stories of loss and hope, not knowing that their lives have brushed up against each other's in small but sometimes profound ways. A multi-ethnic ensemble drama, the film explores the connections between a Mexican graffiti muralist, an Armenian camera repairman, an African-American blues guitarist and an English pensioner living near the Los Angeles River.

Happy is a talented teenage graffiti muralist with a passion for spray paint and hip hop. Her playground is the concrete banks of the Los Angeles River. While painting a mural of her trademark Payasa, a sad-faced Lady Clown, she encounters Sal, a mentally challenged homeless man who attempts to make contact with her.

Unable to communicate with Happy, Sal then crosses paths with Avo, a vintage camera repairman living with his wife Allegra on the East Bank of the river. Their apartment overlooks Happy’s Payasa mural near the area where their four-year-old daughter Heidi recently drowned. Since Heidi’s death, Avo and Allegra have not spoken. As Happy toils on the Payasa, Avo attempts to reconcile with his wife in the wake of the family tragedy.

A block away from Avo’s apartment, Ridley is a struggling blues guitarist staying in an old hotel by the river. He has returned temporarily to Los Angeles to care for his mother. One night, Ridley hears an enigmatic voice coming from somewhere inside the hotel. Haunted by its mysterious presence, Ridley sets out to discover the source of the voice, running into Sal in the wake of a hit-and-run accident.

Humphrey is an aging pensioner living in an apartment overlooking the ‘islands’ in the river. One morning he wakes up to the sound of Sal screaming on the sidewalk. Having recently lost his wife Ethel, Humphrey spends his days eating lunch by her grave, a few feet from Heidi’s resting place where he sees Allegra. Unsure when his time will come, Humphrey readjusts to everyday life, crossing paths with Happy as he wanders the riverside neighborhood.

== Cast ==
- Alyssa Milano as Allegra
- Yorick van Wageningen as Avo
- Emily Rios as Happy
- Derrick O'Connor as Humphrey
- Clarence Williams III as Ridley
- Paul Dillon as Sal
- Sophia Malki as Heidi
- Rachel Miner as Julie
- Sarah Jones as Young Ethel
- Karen Kondazian as Tello
- Baadja-Lyne Odums as Ridley's Mom
- Renn Woods as Aria
- Eric Burdon as Bar Singer

== Reception ==
"Largely dialogue-free, the pic shuns histrionics, instead generating its gathering emotional force via carefully crafted images and sharp editing, though it fails to reap the potential benefits of the decision to tie its yarns together...a strong calling card for debutante Eric Nazarian.” –Variety

== Production ==
The genesis of the film came from writer/director Eric Nazarian's childhood when he moved to Los Angeles from the former Soviet Union and raised in a neighborhood near the Los Angeles River. The river's unique landscape inspired him to make the film.
