= Mayak (film) =

- Directed by: Mariya Saakyan
- Written by: Givi Shavgulidze
- Produced by: Anton Melnik
- Starring: Anna Kapaleva; Olga Yakovleva; Sos Sargsyan; Sofiko Chiaureli; Ruzana Avetisyan; Mikhail Bogdasarov; Anastasiya Grebennikova
- Cinematography: Maxim Drozdov
- Music by: Kimmo Pohjonen
- Distributed by: Andreevsky Flag Film Company
- Release date: 2006
- Running time: 78 min.
- Countries: Russia; Armenia
- Language: Russian

Mayak (Russian: Маяк, meaning The Lighthouse) is a 2006 Russian film directed by Mariya Saakyan. Young director Mariya Saakyan made the picture about the war in the Caucasus, but without the war.

== Synopsis ==
The film is about the war in Armenia from women's point of view. The girl (Lena) from Moscow, rides in a small North-Armenian town, where she was born. Then the war begins. Lena wants to take her grandmother and grandfather out of the town, but having arrived home, she realizes that she has no opportunity to return to Moscow. Lena learns to live in the conditions of war. She realizes that to run away does not mean to escape. The latest frames of the film give us hope that life continues and everything will be fine.

== Cast ==
- Anna Kapaleva - Lena
- Olga Yakovleva - Grandmother
- Sos Sargsyan - Grandfather
- Sofiko Chiaureli - neighbour
- Ruzana Avetisyan - Roza
- Mikhail Bogdasarov - Levan
- Anastasiya Grebennikova - Izolda

== Awards ==
- London Film Festival
- Rotterdam International Film Festival
