= Vardan Hovhannisyan =

Armenian director and producer

Vardan Hovhannisyan is an Armenian director and producer.

From 1988 to 1991, Vardan Hovhannisyan was a freelance cameraman and covered the hot regions and ethnic conflicts related to the post-Soviet transition for the international news. He was twice captured as a prisoner of war during the First Nagorno-Karabakh War.

In 1993, he established Bars Media Documentary Film Studio, one of the first independent film companies in Armenia, which specializes in making documentaries about human stories, culture, history and other social issues. He has also been the executive producer of documentaries for organizations such as the United Nations, USAID, OSCE, the British Council and Oxfam.

His film A Story of People in War and Peace has won over 20 awards including the FIPRESCI prize, the Best New Documentary Filmmaker Award at Tribeca Film Festival (New York, 2007), the Audience Award at Trieste Film Festival (Italy 2007), the Special Mention Award at the ZagrebDox Film Festival (Croatia 2007) and Docaviv Film Festival (Israel 2007), and was nominated for the Joris Ivens award at IDFA (The Netherlands, 2006). The film has been shown on the BBC, ARTE WDR, YLE, Documentary Channel US and will be shown on PBS. Recently, he produced the documentary The Last Tightrope Dancer in Armenia, an international co-production with NHK, ITVS, YLE, SVT, TVP.

Vardan is also developing documentary films in Africa, Russia, Afghanistan, and at the North and South Poles. He is currently planning to start the production of his next film Hot Archeology in Afghanistan. Vardan is a certified sports-plane pilot and first-class parachutist, experienced in aerial film shooting. He is a member of the EDN and the IDA.
