= Suren Babayan =

Armenien film director (1950–2023)

- Սուրեն Բաբայան
- Born: 18 September 1950; Yerevan, Armenian SSR, USSR
- Died: 4 December 2023 (aged 73)
- Occupations: Actor, director and screenwriter

Suren Gurgeni Babayan (Armenian: Սուրեն Գուրգենի Բաբայան, 18 September 1950 – 4 December 2023) was an Armenian film actor, director and screenwriter.

== Biography ==
Babayan was born in Yerevan in 1950. He graduated from the "Directing Department of Yerevan Fine Arts and Theatre Institute" in 1972 and from "Advanced Directing Courses" in Moscow in 1980. Since 1980, Babayan had worked for "Hayfilm Studio" as a director.

Babayan died on 4 December 2023, at the age of 73.

== Filmography ==
year	title	actor	writer	director
1978	Neutral Situation (short)		Yes	Yes
1980	The Eighth Day of Creation (short)		Yes	Yes
1982	Cry of a Peacock			Yes
1986	Frunze Dovlatyan (doc.)			Yes
1988	The 13th Apostle			Yes
1989	Facing the Wall		Yes	
1990	Blood		Yes	Yes
1993	"P.S.," noai.			Yes
1996	Gyumri-review, doc.		Yes	Yes
1997	The Bride from Jermouk			
2000	Crazy Angel	Yes	Yes	Yes
2004	Zhano		Yes	Yes
2009	Don't Look in the Mirror		Yes	Yes
2013	The Thorn			
