= Aditya Assarat =

Thai film director

- อาทิตย์ อัสสรัตน์
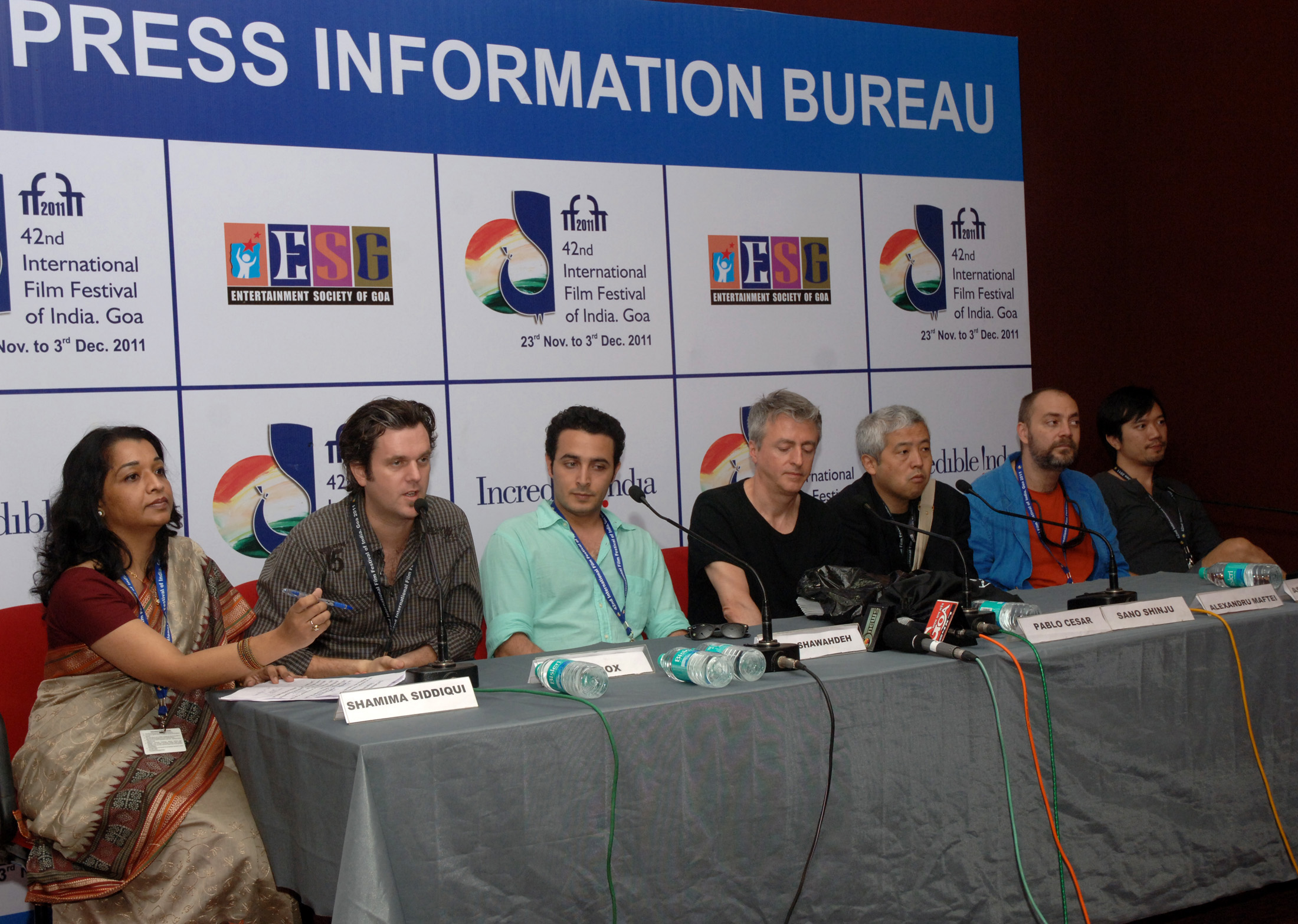
- Aditya Assarat (right), IFFI (2011)
- Born: January 16, 1972 (age 54); Bangkok, Thailand
- Education: University of Southern California; New York University
- Occupations: Film director; screenwriter; producer
- Years active: 2000–present

Aditya Assarat (Thai: อาทิตย์ อัสสรัตน์, born 1972) is a Thai independent film director, screenwriter, producer and cinematographer.

== Biography ==
=== Early career ===
Aditya Assarat was born in Bangkok. He left Thailand at the age of 15 to be educated in the United States. While studying history at New York University, he became interested in filmmaking. He went on to earn a master's degree in film production from the University of Southern California School of Cinematic Arts in 2000.

His graduate thesis film, the 15-minute short, Motorcycle was about a father grieving over the loss of his son in a motorcycle wreck. It was screened at dozens of film festivals, including the Chicago International Film Festival, where it won a Gold Hugo award, the San Francisco International Film Festival, where it won a Golden Gate Award, and Aspen Shortsfest as well as Shorts International Film Festival in New York City, where it was named best short film. It also won the R. D. Pestonji Award at the 2000 Thai Short Film and Video Festival and the Vision of Life Award at the 2000 Bangkok Film Festival.

Other short films followed, including 705 Sukumvit 55 in 2002 and Waiting, a 25-minute short made in 2003. Waiting was screened at more than a dozen festivals, including the Thai Short Film and Video Festival, where it won a special merit award, the Barcelona Asian Pacific Short Film Festival, where it won best short, and the Torino Film Festival where it won the Cinemavvenire Award for Best Short Film.

In 2002, Aditya directed Pru Raw Velvet: A Concert Documentary, for the Thai rock band Pru, working with a childhood friend, Kamol "Suki" Sukosol Clapp, a member of the band. The 120-minute feature was screened on both Channel V Thailand and MTV Thailand.

=== 3 Friends ===
In 2003, Aditya won the Hubert Bals Award at the International Film Festival Rotterdam, and was invited to take part in the Pusan Promotional Plan. Aditya also participated in the Annenberg Film Fellows Program at the Sundance Institute that same year.

During the year, Aditya helped develop an experimental feature film, 3 Friends (Ma-Mee), which had a limited release, including a screenings at the 2005 Toronto International Film Festival, where it premiered, and the 2006 Bangkok International Film Festival. He co-directed the film with Mingmongkol Sonakul and Pumin Chinaradee. It starred actress Napakpapha Nakprasitte, playing herself, in a film that was part documentary, part parody of the reality television phenomenon.

=== Pop Pictures ===
In 2006, Aditya and friends Soros Sukhum and Jetnipith Teerakulchanyut formed their own production company, Pop Pictures, making television commercials, music videos, TV programs and films.

One of the company's works is Dreamchaser, a Thai reality television series. For the first season, shown in 2006, documented a cross motorcycle journey around Thailand by Aditya's friend, musician Suki Sukosol Clapp of Pru. The second season, set for 2007-08, is to feature Suki travelling with actor Ananda Everingham in Laos, Cambodia and Vietnam.

=== Wonderful Town ===
Also in 2006, Aditya was working on his first feature-length drama film, Wonderful Town set in post-tsunami Phang Nga Province, which premiered in 2007 and has since been shown and won awards at several film festivals.

=== Hi-So ===
Hi-So was screened at the Berlinale 2011 Film Festival. In an interview, Aditya explains that Hi-So was originally the first film he worked on after grad school, but ended up working on and releasing Wonderful Town first. The title Hi-So means "high society" and Aditya expresses that his film focuses on "the opportunities of people who have things and people who don't. And the biggest difference is in your mind. Some people would feel uncomfortable walking into a Prada store, just like some people are uncomfortable walking into a slum. I wanted to talk about the differences that exist in your head."

== Working methods ==
Aditya has remained an independent filmmaker, despite an offer to direct a film for a major Thai studio.

"It wouldn't have worked. It was too far removed from my filmmaking style. But if the studio is willing to make the film with me, in my own style, it's worth trying. It would be difficult, though. There's not much of a market for alternative films here [in Thailand]," he said in a 2007 interview.

Having been educated outside Thailand for many years, Aditya says he feels more comfortable writing his scripts in English language, which then must be translated into the Thai language.

"It's the one real dilemma in my filmmaking. I haven't yet really worked through it," he said in a 2007 interview. "But it's annoying as it slows everything down. What I want to say on film still has to go through someone else. I'll try to solve the problem in my next film by making my main character more like me - a Thai who's grown up overseas and speaks English for half the story."
