= Wonderful Town (film) =

- Film poster
- Directed by: Aditya Assarat
- Written by: Aditya Assarat
- Produced by: Soros Sukhum; Jetnipith Teerakulchanyut
- Starring: Anchalee Saisoontorn; Supphasit Kansen
- Cinematography: Ampornpol Yukol
- Edited by: Lee Chatametikool
- Music by: Koichi Shimizu
- Production company: Pop Pictures
- Release date: 8 October 2007 (South Korea)
- Running time: 92 minutes
- Country: Thailand
- Language: Thai

Wonderful Town is a 2007 Thai film written and directed by Aditya Assarat.

The film is set on the mainland north of Phuket Island in the dreary post-tsunami Khao Lak area and Takua Pa town, Phang Nga Province. Shooting was completed in December 2006, for which Aditya had secured funding from Singha Beer and Rolex. More money was needed for post-production work; funds were provided by the Thailand Ministry of Culture's Office of Contemporary Art and Culture.

Wonderful Town premiered at the 2007 Busan International Film Festival. It won the festival's top prize, the New Currents Award and a US$90,000 prize, which was split evenly with two other filmmakers who also won the award, Malaysian director Liew Seng Tat, who won for his film Flower in the Pocket, and Guang Hao-jin of China, for his film Life Track.

Aditya said he would use his prize money to transfer his digital-format footage to 35-millimeter, and hoped it would have a limited screening in Bangkok sometime in 2008. Wonderful Town was shown in the Forum programme at the 2008 Berlin International Film Festival, and won the prestigious Tiger Award at the 2008 International Film Festival Rotterdam.
