= Serge Avédikian =

Armenian-French actor, film director and screenwriter

Serge Avédikian Սերժ Ավետիքյան
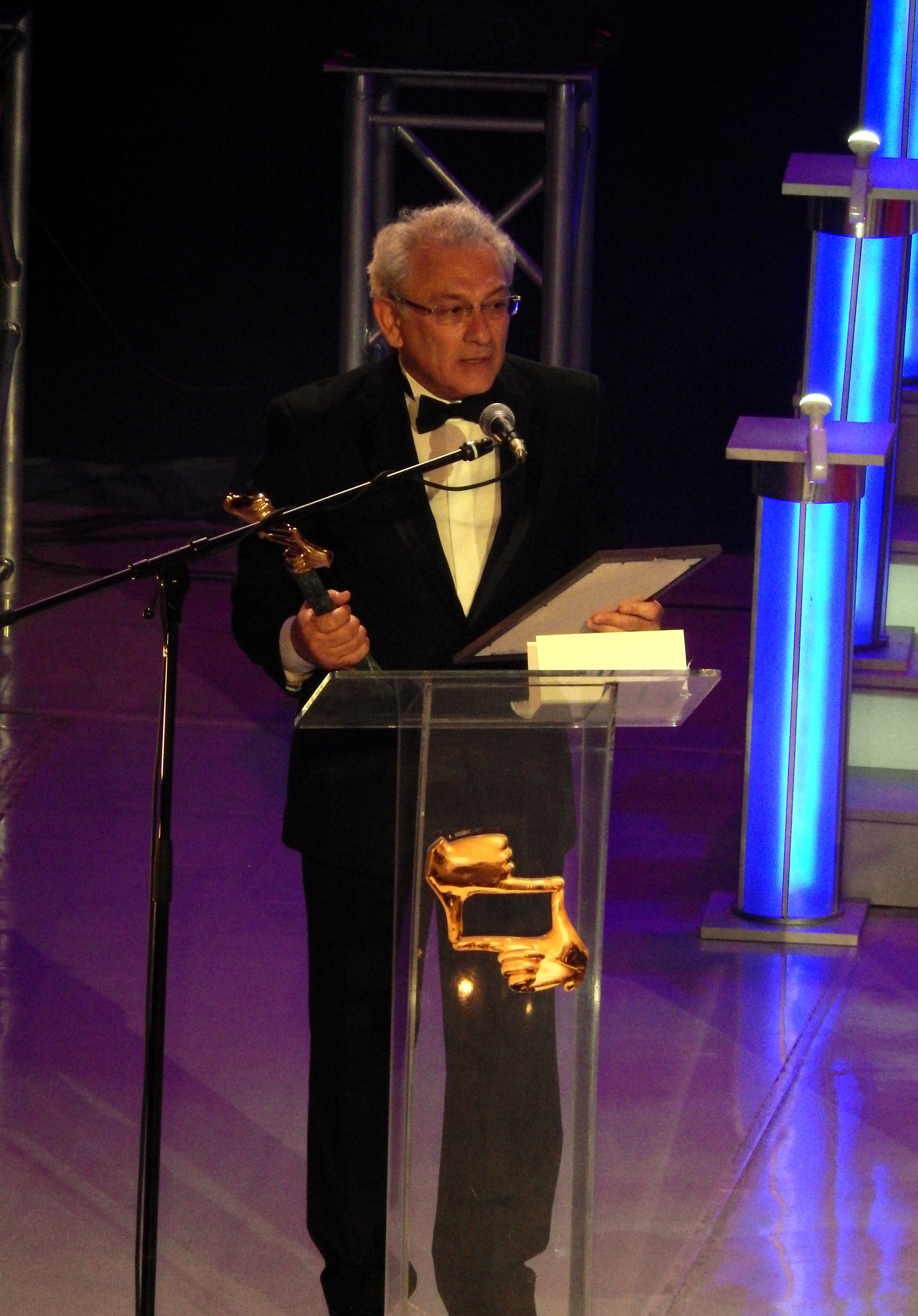
- Born: 1 December 1955 (age 70); Yerevan, SSR of Armenia, Soviet Union
- Years active: 1979–present
- Website: http://www.serge-avedikian.fr

Serge Avédikian (Armenian: Սերժ Ավետիքյան; born 1 December 1955), sometimes credited as Serje Avétikian, is an Armenian-French film and theatre actor, director, writer and producer, winner of Cannes Festival prize.

== Early life ==
Avédikian was born in Yerevan, Armenian SSR. His parents were born in France, children of survivors of the Armenian genocide. In 1947, influenced by Joseph Stalin's and Maurice Thorez's propaganda, they left to rejoin the motherland, where Avédikian attended the French school of Yerevan. At the age of fifteen along with his family, he returned to France. He had his stage debut in college, in his professor's amateur theater company.

== Professional practice ==
After studies at the Conservatory of Dramatic Arts in Meudon (France), he arrived in Paris in 1971 where he worked with the students of the Paris Conservatory. In 1976, he created a theater company and produced several plays. At the same time, he pursued a career as a theater, movie and television actor. In 1988, he founded his own production company but continues to direct films.

He then worked in television (Toutes griffes dehors by Michel Boisrond, 1982; L'Été de tous les chagrins by Serge Moati, 1989), alternating between major productions (L'Orchestre rouge by Jacques Rouffio, 1989) and politically committed works (L'Aube by Miklós Jancsó, 1985). He also championed unconventional projects, including Haltéroflic by Philippe Vallois (1983), La Diagonale du fou by Richard Dembo (1984), Le Trésor des îles Chiennes by F. J. Ossang (1990) and Les Semeurs de peste by Christian Merlhiot (1995).

He is also a key figure in films exploring Armenian memory, appearing in Mayrig by Henri Verneuil (1991), Aram by Robert Kechichian (2002), and Le Voyage en Arménie (2006) and L'Armée du crime (2009), both by Robert Guédiguian.

His roles span genres, periods, countries and backgrounds, including Le Cahier volé by Christine Lipinska (1993), Labyrinth by Mikael Dovlatyan (1995), Vive la mariée… et la libération du Kurdistan by Hiner Saleem (1997), Disparus by Gilles Bourdos (1998), Paris, mon petit corps est bien las de ce grand monde by Françoise Prenant (2000), Agents secrets by Frédéric Schoendoerffer (2004), Viva Laldjérie by Nadir Moknèche (2004) and Poulet aux prunes by Marjane Satrapi and Vincent Paronnaud (2011).

He then worked in television (Toutes griffes dehors by Michel Boisrond, 1982; L'Été de tous les chagrins by Serge Moati, 1989), alternating between major productions (L'Orchestre rouge by Jacques Rouffio, 1989) and politically committed works (L'Aube by Miklós Jancsó, 1985). He also championed unconventional projects, including Haltéroflic by Philippe Vallois (1983), La Diagonale du fou by Richard Dembo (1984), Le Trésor des îles Chiennes by F. J. Ossang (1990) and Les Semeurs de peste by Christian Merlhiot (1995).

He is also a key figure in films exploring Armenian memory, appearing in Mayrig by Henri Verneuil (1991), Aram by Robert Kechichian (2002), and Le Voyage en Arménie (2006) and L'Armée du crime (2009), both by Robert Guédiguian.

His roles span genres, periods, countries and backgrounds, including Le Cahier volé by Christine Lipinska (1993), Labyrinth by Mikael Dovlatyan (1995), Vive la mariée… et la libération du Kurdistan by Hiner Saleem (1997), Disparus by Gilles Bourdos (1998), Paris, mon petit corps est bien las de ce grand monde by Françoise Prenant (2000), Agents secrets by Frédéric Schoendoerffer (2004), Viva Laldjérie by Nadir Moknèche (2004) and Poulet aux prunes by Marjane Satrapi and Vincent Paronnaud (2011).

He has made guest appearances in numerous television series (Toutes griffes dehors; La Crim', 2002; Quai n° 1, 2005; Louis Page, 2006). On stage, he has performed works by Botho Strauß, Jean Genet, Marivaux, Paul Claudel, Dan Franck, Tennessee Williams and Corneille, under the direction of Patrice Chéreau, Jacques Lassalle, Claude Régy and others.

As a director, he has built a body of work comprising documentaries as well as short films: fiction (Bonjour Monsieur, 1992; Mission accomplie, 1994; M'sieurs Dames, 1997), poetic works (J'ai bien connu le soleil, 1991; Le Cinquième Rêve, 1995; Terra Emota, 1999; Lux Aeterna, 1999) and animation (Ligne de vie, 2003; Un beau matin, 2005).

In 2007, he completed the documentary Nous avons bu la même eau (We Drank the Same Water), recounting his return to his grandfather's village of Sölöz in present-day Turkey, poised between past and future.

In 2010, he won the Short Film Palme d'Or at the Cannes Film Festival for his animated film Chienne d'histoire (Barking Island).

In 2013, he released Le Scandale Paradjanov (also known as Paradjanov), a feature-length fiction film about the life and work of filmmaker Sergei Parajanov, which he co-directed with Olena Fetisova and in which he played the title role.

In 2017, he became an ambassador for the association 1 pour tous, tous pour l'autisme ("One for all, all for autism").

== Filmography ==
- "Anatolian History" (2020)
- Don't Tell Me the Boy Was Mad (2015)
- Paradjanov (2013, director) as Sergei Parajanov
- The Army of Crime (2009) as Micha Aznavourian
- Bonded Parallels (2007) as Arakel
- Le Voyage en Arménie (Armenia) (2006) as Vanig
- Angkor : la forêt de pierre (2002) as voice-over narrator
- La Terre des Peaux-Rouges (2002) as voice-over narrator
- Aram (2002) as Talaat
- Mayrig (1991) as Vasken Papasian
- Dawn (1985)
- Dangerous Moves (1984)
- Toutes griffes dehors (1982)
- Nous étions un seul homme (We Were One Man) (1979) as Guy Rouveron
- Le Pull-over rouge (1979) as Christian Ranucci
