= List of thriller films of the 1980s =

A list of thriller films released in the 1980s.

Title	Director	Cast	Country	Subgenre/notes
1980
Aquella casa en las afueras	Eugenio Martín	Javier Escrivá, Silvia Águila, Mara Goyanes	Spain	
The Attic	George Edwards	Ray Milland	United States	
Bad Timing	Nicolas Roeg	Art Garfunkel, Theresa Russell, Harvey Keitel, Denholm Elliott	United Kingdom	Erotic thriller
Le bar du téléphone	Claude Barrois	Daniel Duval, François Périer, Georges Wilson	France	Crime thriller
The Changeling	Peter Medak	George C. Scott, Trish Van Devere, Melvyn Douglas	Canada	
Cruising	William Friedkin	Al Pacino, Paul Sorvino, Karen Allen	United States	
Dressed to Kill	Brian De Palma	Michael Caine, Angie Dickinson, Nancy Allen	United States	Psychological thriller, erotic thriller
Harlequin	Simon Wincer	Robert Powell, Carmen Duncan, David Hemmings	Australia	
The Hearse	George Bowers	Trish Van Devere, Joseph Cotten, David Gautreaux	United States	Supernatural thriller, psychological thriller
The House on the Edge of the Park	Ruggero Deodato	David Hess, Annie Belle, Giovanni Lombardo Radice	Italy	
The Hunter	Buzz Kulik	Steve McQueen, Eli Wallach, Kathryn Harrold, LeVar Burton, Ben Johnson, Tracey Walter	United States	Action thriller
Nightkill	Ted Post	Robert Mitchum, Jaclyn Smith	West Germany	
The Stunt Man	Richard Rush	Peter O'Toole, Steve Railsback, Barbara Hershey	United States	Comedy thriller
Three Men to Kill	Jacques Deray	Alain Delon, Dalila Di Lazzaro, Pierre Dux	France	
Windows	Gordon Willis	Talia Shire, Joseph Cortese, Elizabeth Ashley	United States	
The Woman Cop	Yves Boisset	Miou-Miou, Jean-Marc Thibault, Leny Escudéro	France	

Title	Director	Cast	Country	Subgenre/Notes
1981
Blow Out	Brian De Palma	John Travolta, Nancy Allen, John Lithgow, Dennis Franz	United States	
Body Heat	Lawrence Kasdan	William Hurt, Kathleen Turner, Richard Crenna, Ted Danson, J.A. Preston, Mickey Rourke	United States	Erotic thriller
Boy Nazareno	Teody Recio	Rhene Imperial, Beth Bautista, Azenith Briones, Carmen Ronda, Dante Rivero, George Estregan, Dick Israel	Philippines	Biographical action thriller
Choice of Arms	Alain Corneau	Yves Montand, Gérard Depardieu, Catherine Deneuve	France	Crime thriller
Deadly Brothers	Cesar Gallardo	Rudy Fernandez, Phillip Salvador	Philippines	Action thriller
Diva	Jean-Jacques Beineix	Frédéric Andréi, Wilhelmenia Wiggins Fernandez	France	
Eaux profondes	Michel Deville	Jean-Louis Trintignant, Isabelle Huppert, Christian Benedetti	France	
Eyes of a Stranger	Ken Wiederhorn	Lauren Tewes, Jennifer Jason Leigh, John DiSanti	United States	
Eyewitness	Peter Yates	William Hurt, Sigourney Weaver, Christopher Plummer, James Woods	United States	
The Fan	Edward Bianchi	Lauren Bacall, James Garner, Maureen Stapleton, Michael Biehn, Hector Elizondo	United States	
Garde à vue	Claude Miller	Lino Ventura, Michel Serrault, Romy Schneider	France	
The Hand	Oliver Stone	Michael Caine, Andrea Marcovicci, Annie McEnroe	United States	Psychological thriller
Looker	Michael Crichton	Albert Finney, James Coburn, Susan Dey	United States	
Ms .45	Abel Ferrara	Zoe Tamerlis, Steve Singer, Jack Thibeau	United States	Crime thriller
Nighthawks	Bruce Malmuth	Sylvester Stallone, Rutger Hauer, Billy Dee Williams, Lindsay Wagner, Persis Khambatta, Nigel Davenport	United States	Crime thriller, action thriller
Pour la peau d'un flic	Alain Delon	Alain Delon, Anne Parillaud	France	
The Professional	Georges Lautner	Jean-Paul Belmondo, Robert Hossein, Cyrielle Clair	France	
Roadgames	Richard Franklin	Stacy Keach, Jamie Lee Curtis	Australia	
Sharky's Machine	Burt Reynolds	Burt Reynolds, Charles Durning, Vittorio Gassman, Rachel Ward	United States	
Southern Comfort	Walter Hill	Keith Carradine, Powers Boothe, Fred Ward	United States	
Strange Behavior	Michael Laughlin	Michael Murphy, Louise Fletcher, Dan Shor	New Zealand	
Thief	Michael Mann	James Caan, Tuesday Weld, Robert Prosky, Willie Nelson	United States	Crime thriller

Title	Director	Cast	Country	Subgenre/Notes
1982
La Balance	Bob Swaim	Nathalie Baye, Philippe Léotard, Richard Berry	France	Crime thriller
Brimstone and Treacle	Richard Loncraine	Sting, Denholm Elliott, Joan Plowright	United Kingdom	Psychological thriller
Le Choc	Robin Davis	Alain Delon, Catherine Deneuve, Philippe Léotard	France	
Class of 1984	Mark L. Lester	Perry King, Timothy Van Patten, Merrie Lynn Ross	Canada	Action thriller
Deathtrap	Sidney Lumet	Michael Caine, Christopher Reeve, Dyan Cannon, Irene Worth, Henry Jones, Joe Silver	United States	Psychological thriller
Death Wish II	Michael Winner	Charles Bronson, Jill Ireland, Vincent Gardenia	United States	
Espion, lève-toi	Yves Boisset	Lino Ventura, Krystyna Janda, Michel Piccoli	France	Political thriller
Les fantômes du chapelier	Claude Chabrol	Michel Serrault, Charles Aznavour, Monique Chaumette	France	
First Blood	Ted Kotcheff	Sylvester Stallone, Richard Crenna, Brian Dennehy	United States	Action thriller
Forced Vengeance	James Fargo	Chuck Norris, Mary Louise Weller, Michael Cavanaugh	United States	Action thriller, martial arts film
Get My Son Dead or Alive	Pepe Marcos	Eddie Garcia, Rudy Fernandez, Vic Vargas	Philippines	Action thriller
The New York Ripper	Lucio Fulci	Jack Hedley, Almanta Keller, Paolo Malco	Italy	
The Seduction	David Schmoeller	Morgan Fairchild, Michael Sarrazin, Andrew Stevens, Vince Edwards, Colleen Camp	United States	
Still of the Night	Robert Benton	Roy Scheider, Meryl Streep, Josef Sommer, Jessica Tandy	United States	
Tenebrae	Dario Argento	Anthony Franciosa, John Saxon, Daria Nicolodi	Italy	
Turkey Shoot	Brian Trenchard-Smith	Steve Railsback, Olivia Hussey, Michael Craig	Australia	
Visiting Hours	Jean-Claude Lord	Michael Ironside, Lee Grant, Linda Purl	Canada	

Title	Director	Cast	Country	Subgenre/Notes
1983
10 to Midnight	J. Lee Thompson	Charles Bronson, Lisa Eilbacher, Andrew Stevens	United States	
Le battant	Alain Delon	Alain Delon, François Périer, Pierre Mondy	France	Crime thriller
Blue Thunder	John Badham	Roy Scheider, Malcolm McDowell, Daniel Stern, Candy Clark, Warren Oates	United States	Action thriller
Brainstorm	Douglas Trumbull	Christopher Walken, Natalie Wood, Cliff Robertson, Louise Fletcher	United States	
Christine	John Carpenter	Keith Gordon, John Stockwell, Alexandra Paul, Robert Prosky, Harry Dean Stanton	United States	
Confidentially Yours	François Truffaut	Fanny Ardant, Jean-Louis Trintignant, Philippe Laudenbach	France	Psychological thriller
Cujo	Lewis Teague	Dee Wallace, Danny Pintauro, Daniel Hugh-Kelly	United States	
The Dead Zone	David Cronenberg	Christopher Walken, Martin Sheen, Brooke Adams, Tom Skerritt, Colleen Dewhurst	United States	Supernatural thriller
Dog Day	Yves Boisset	Lee Marvin, Miou-Miou, Jean Carmet	France	
Dope Godfather	Junn Cabrera	Tony Ferrer, Vic Vargas	Philippines	Action thriller
The Fourth Man	Paul Verhoeven	Jeroen Krabbé, Renée Soutendijk, Thom Hoffman	Netherlands	
Le Marginal	Jacques Deray	Jean-Paul Belmondo, Henry Silva	France	
Mortelle Randonnée	Claude Miller	Michel Serrault, Isabelle Adjani, Geneviève Page	France	
Octopussy	John Glen	Roger Moore, Maud Adams, Louis Jourdan	United Kingdom	Action thriller
Over My Dead Body	Arsenio Bautista	Tony Ferrer, Efren Reyes, Jr., Bembol Roco	Philippines	Action thriller
Le Prix du Danger	Yves Boisset	Gérard Lanvin, Michel Piccoli, Marie-France Pisier	France	
Psycho II	Richard Franklin	Anthony Perkins, Vera Miles, Robert Loggia, Meg Tilly, Dennis Franz	United States	
The Osterman Weekend	Sam Peckinpah	Rutger Hauer, John Hurt, Craig T. Nelson, Burt Lancaster, Dennis Hopper, Chris Sarandon, Meg Foster	United States	Political thriller
The Star Chamber	Peter Hyams	Michael Douglas, Hal Holbrook, Yaphet Kotto	United States	
Sudden Impact	Clint Eastwood	Clint Eastwood, Sondra Locke, Pat Hingle	United States	
Umpisahan Mo, Tatapusin Ko	Ronwaldo Reyes	Fernando Poe Jr., Baby Delgado, Paquito Diaz, Rodolfo Boy Garcia, Lito Anzures, Fred Montilla	Philippines	Action thriller
WarGames	John Badham	Matthew Broderick, Dabney Coleman, Ally Sheedy	United States	

Title	Director	Cast	Country	Subgenre/Notes
1984
Alyas Baby Tsina	Marilou Diaz-Abaya	Vilma Santos, Phillip Salvador, Dindo Fernando, Rez Cortez, Johnny Delgado	Philippines	Thriller drama
American Dreamer	Rick Rosenthal	JoBeth Williams, Tom Conti, Giancarlo Giannini	United States	
Batiguas II: Pasukuin si Waway	Manuel "Fyke" Cinco	Rudy Fernandez, George Estregan, Maria Isabel Lopez, Ronnie Lazaro	Philippines	Biographical action thriller
Blood Simple	Joel Coen	John Getz, Frances McDormand, Dan Hedaya, M. Emmet Walsh	United States	Crime thriller
Body Double	Brian De Palma	Craig Wasson, Gregg Henry, Melanie Griffith	United States	
Cloak & Dagger	Richard Franklin	Henry Thomas, Dabney Coleman, Michael Murphy	United States	Paranoid thriller
Crimes of Passion	Ken Russell	Kathleen Turner, Anthony Perkins, John Laughlin, Annie Potts	United States	
Dreamscape	Joseph Ruben	Dennis Quaid, Max von Sydow, Kate Capshaw, Christopher Plummer	United States	
The Evil That Men Do	J. Lee Thompson	Charles Bronson, Theresa Saldana, Joseph Maher	United States	
Firestarter	Mark L. Lester	David Keith, Drew Barrymore, George C. Scott, Martin Sheen, Heather Locklear, Freddie Jones, Louise Fletcher, Art Carney	United States	Psychological thriller, action thriller
Missing in Action	Joseph Zito	Chuck Norris, M. Emmet Walsh, David Tress	United States	Action thriller
Savage Streets	Danny Steinmann	Linda Blair, Linnea Quigley, John Vernon	United States	
The Strangler vs. the Strangler	Slobodan Šijan	Taško Načić, Srđan Šaper, Sonja Savić	Yugoslavia	
Streets of Fire	Walter Hill	Michael Paré, Diane Lane, Rick Moranis, Amy Madigan, Willem Dafoe	United States	
Thief of Hearts	Douglas Day Stewart	Steven Bauer, Barbara Williams, John Getz, David Caruso, George Wendt, Christine Ebersole	United States	
Tightrope	Richard Tuggle	Clint Eastwood, Geneviève Bujold, Dan Hedaya	United States	
Toy Soldiers	David Fisher	Jason Miller, Cleavon Little, Terri Garber	United States	Action thriller

Title	Director	Cast	Country	Subgenre/Notes
1985
Cat's Eye	Lewis Teague	Drew Barrymore, James Woods, Robert Hays, Candy Clark, Kenneth McMillan	United States	
Compromising Positions	Frank Perry	Susan Sarandon, Raul Julia, Edward Herrmann, Mary Beth Hurt, Judith Ivey, Joe Mantegna	United States	
Death in a French Garden	Michel Deville	Christophe Malavoy, Nicole Garcia, Michel Piccoli	France	
Death Wish 3	Michael Winner	Charles Bronson, Deborah Raffin, Ed Lauter	United States	Action thriller
Defence of the Realm	David Drury	Gabriel Byrne, Greta Scacchi, Denholm Elliott	United Kingdom	
Fletch	Michael Ritchie	Chevy Chase, Joe Don Baker, Dana Wheeler-Nicholson, Richard Libertini, Tim Matheson	United States	Comedy thriller
He Died with His Eyes Open	Jacques Deray	Michel Serrault, Charlotte Rampling	France	
The Holcroft Covenant	John Frankenheimer	Michael Caine, Anthony Andrews, Victoria Tennant	United Kingdom	
Into the Night	John Landis	Jeff Goldblum, Michelle Pfeiffer, Dan Aykroyd	United States	
Jagged Edge	Richard Marquand	Glenn Close, Jeff Bridges, Peter Coyote, Robert Loggia	United States	
The Man with One Red Shoe	Stan Dragoti	Tom Hanks, Dabney Coleman, Lori Singer, Carrie Fisher, Jim Belushi	United States	Comedy thriller
The Mean Season	Phillip Borsos	Kurt Russell, Mariel Hemingway, Richard Jordan	United States	
The New Kids	Sean S. Cunningham	Shannon Presby, Lori Loughlin, James Spader	United States	
Partida	Ben Yalung	Fernando Poe Jr.	Philippines	Action thriller
Police	Maurice Pialat	Gérard Depardieu, Sophie Marceau, Richard Anconina	France	Action thriller
Rambo: First Blood Part II	George Pan Cosmatos	Sylvester Stallone, Richard Crenna, Charles Napier	United States	Action thriller
Runaway Train	Andrei Konchalovsky	Jon Voight, Eric Roberts, Rebecca De Mornay	United States	Action thriller
Sotto il vestito niente	Carlo Vanzina	Tom Schanley, Renée Simonsen, Donald Pleasence	Italy	
Les Spécialistes	Patrice Leconte	Gérard Lanvin, Bernard Giraudeau, Christiane Jean	France	Crime thriller
Subway	Luc Besson	Isabelle Adjani, Christopher Lambert, Jean-Pierre Bacri	France	
Target	Arthur Penn	Gene Hackman, Matt Dillon, Josef Sommer, Gayle Hunnicutt	United States	Action thriller
Thou Shalt Not Kill... Except	Josh Becker	Brian Schulz, John Manfredi, Robert Rickman	United States	
To Live and Die in L.A.	William Friedkin	William Petersen, Willem Dafoe, John Pankow	United States	
The Trap	Giuseppe Patroni Griffi	Tony Musante, Laura Antonelli	Italy; Spain	
A View to a Kill	John Glen	Roger Moore, Christopher Walken, Tanya Roberts, Grace Jones	United Kingdom	Action thriller
Witness	Peter Weir	Harrison Ford, Kelly McGillis, Lukas Haas, Josef Sommer, Jan Rubes, Alexander Godunov	United States	
Year of the Dragon	Michael Cimino	Mickey Rourke, John Lone, Ariane	United States	

Title	Director	Cast	Country	Subgenre/Notes
1986
52 Pick-Up	John Frankenheimer	Roy Scheider, Ann-Margret, John Glover, Vanity, Kelly Preston	United States	Crime thriller
A Better Tomorrow	John Woo	Chow Yun-fat, Leslie Cheung, Ti Lung	Hong Kong	Action thriller
Black Moon Rising	Harley Cokliss	Tommy Lee Jones, Linda Hamilton, Robert Vaughn	United States	Action thriller, crime thriller
Bleu Comme L'Enfer	Yves Boisset	Lambert Wilson, Tchéky Karyo, Myriem Roussel	France	
Blue City	Michelle Manning	Judd Nelson, Ally Sheedy, David Caruso, Scott Wilson	United States	Crime thriller, political thriller
Blue Velvet	David Lynch	Kyle MacLachlan, Isabella Rossellini, Dennis Hopper, Laura Dern	United States	Crime thriller
Cobra	George Pan Cosmatos	Sylvester Stallone, Brigitte Nielsen, Reni Santoni, Brian Thompson	United States	Action thriller
Extremities	Robert M. Young	Farrah Fawcett, James Russo, Alfre Woodard, Diana Scarwid	United States	
F/X	Robert Mandel	Bryan Brown, Brian Dennehy, Cliff DeYoung, Diane Venora, Jerry Orbach	United States	
Half Moon Street	Bob Swaim	Sigourney Weaver, Michael Caine, Patrick Kavanagh	United Kingdom; United States	
Henry: Portrait of a Serial Killer	John McNaughton	Michael Rooker, Tom Towles, Tracy Arnold	United States	
Heroes Shed No Tears	John Woo	Eddy Ko	Hong Kong	Action thriller
The Hitcher	Robert Harmon	Rutger Hauer, C. Thomas Howell, Jennifer Jason Leigh	United States	
Isusumpa Mo Ang Araw Nang Isilang Ka	Nilo Saez	Ramon "Bong" Revilla Jr., Efren Reyes Jr., Susan Bautista, Carol Dauden, Dick Israel, Rez Cortez, Renato del Prado, King Gutierrez, Manny Luna, George Estregan	Philippines	Action thriller
Jumpin' Jack Flash	Penny Marshall	Whoopi Goldberg, Stephen Collins, John Wood	United States	Comedy thriller
Kamikaze	Didier Grousset	Richard Bohringer, Dominique Lavanant, Michel Galabru	France	
Legal Eagles	Ivan Reitman	Robert Redford, Debra Winger, Daryl Hannah, Brian Dennehy, Terence Stamp, Steven Hill	United States	Comedy thriller
The Manhattan Project	Marshall Brickman	Christopher Collet, John Lithgow	United States	
Manhunter	Michael Mann	William Petersen, Tom Noonan, Dennis Farina, Brian Cox, Kim Greist, Joan Allen, Stephen Lang	United States	
The Matador	Pedro Almodóvar	Assumpta Serna, Antonio Banderas	Spain	
The Morning After	Sidney Lumet	Jane Fonda, Jeff Bridges, Raul Julia	United States	
Murphy's Law	J. Lee Thompson	Charles Bronson, Kathleen Wilhoite, Carrie Snodgress	United States	
Raw Deal	John Irvin	Arnold Schwarzenegger, Kathryn Harrold, Darren McGavin	United States	Action thriller
Zone rouge	Robert Enrico	Richard Anconina, Sabine Azéma, Hélène Surgère	France	

Title	Director	Cast	Country	Subgenre/Notes
1987
Agent trouble	Jean-Pierre Mocky	Richard Bohringer, Catherine Deneuve, Pierre Arditi	France	
Angel Heart	Alan Parker	Mickey Rourke, Robert De Niro, Lisa Bonet, Charlotte Rampling	United States	Supernatural thriller
Anguish	J.J. Bigas Luna	Zelda Rubinstein, Michael Lerner, Talia Paul	Spain	Psychological thriller
Assassination	Peter Hunt	Charles Bronson, Jill Ireland, Stephen Elliott	United States	
The Bedroom Window	Curtis Hanson	Steve Guttenberg, Elizabeth McGovern, Isabelle Huppert	United States	
Best Seller	John Flynn	James Woods, Brian Dennehy, Victoria Tennant	United States	
The Big Easy	Jim McBride	Dennis Quaid, Ellen Barkin, Ned Beatty	United States	
Black Cobra	Stelvio Massi	Fred Williamson, Eva Grimaldi, Bruno Bilotta	Italy	Action thriller
Black Widow	Bob Rafelson	Debra Winger, Theresa Russell, Sami Frey, Nicol Williamson, Dennis Hopper	United States	
City on Fire	Ringo Lam	Chow Yun-fat, Sun Yueh, Danny Lee	Hong Kong	Crime thriller
Cold Steel	Dorothy Ann Puzo	Brad Davis, Sharon Stone, Jonathan Banks	United States	
The Cry of the Owl	Claude Chabrol	Christophe Malavoy, Mathilda May, Jacques Penot	France; Italy	
Dead of Winter	Arthur Penn	Mary Steenburgen, Roddy McDowall, Jan Rubeš	United States	
Death Wish 4: The Crackdown	J. Lee Thompson	Charles Bronson, Kay Lenz, John P. Ryan	United States	Action thriller
Delirium	Lamberto Bava	Serena Grandi, Daria Nicolodi, Katrine Michelsen	Italy	
Extreme Prejudice	Walter Hill	Nick Nolte, Powers Boothe, Maria Conchita Alonso, Michael Ironside, Clancy Brown, William Forsythe	United States	Action thriller
Fatal Attraction	Adrian Lyne	Michael Douglas, Glenn Close, Anne Archer	United States	
The Fourth Protocol	John MacKenzie	Michael Caine, Pierce Brosnan, Joanna Cassidy	United Kingdom	
House of Games	David Mamet	Lindsay Crouse, Joe Mantegna, Steven Goldstein	United States	
Lady Beware	Karen Arthur	Diane Lane, Michael Woods, Cotter Smith	United States	
Lethal Weapon	Richard Donner	Mel Gibson, Danny Glover, Gary Busey	United States	Action thriller
Masques	Claude Chabrol	Philippe Noiret, Robin Renucci, Monique Chaumette	France	
Nadine	Robert Benton	Jeff Bridges, Kim Basinger, Rip Torn, Gwen Verdon, Glenne Headly, Jerry Stiller	United States	Comedy thriller
No Way Out	Roger Donaldson	Kevin Costner, Gene Hackman, Sean Young, Will Patton, George Dzundza	United States	
Opera	Dario Argento	Christina Marsillach, Urbano Barberini, Daria Nicolodi	Italy	
A Prayer for the Dying	Mike Hodges	Mickey Rourke, Bob Hoskins, Alan Bates	United Kingdom	Political thriller
Prison on Fire	Ringo Lam	Chow Yun-fat, Tony Leung Kar-Fai	Hong Kong; China	Action thriller
Robocop	Paul Verhoeven	Peter Weller, Nancy Allen, Ronny Cox	United States	Science fiction thriller, action thriller
Le Solitaire	Jacques Deray	Jean-Paul Belmondo, Jean-Pierre Malo, Michel Creton	France	
Someone to Watch over Me	Ridley Scott	Tom Berenger, Mimi Rogers, Lorraine Bracco, Andreas Katsulas	United States	
Stakeout	John Badham	Richard Dreyfuss, Emilio Estevez, Madeleine Stowe, Aidan Quinn, Forest Whitaker, Dan Lauria	United States	
The Stepfather	Joseph Ruben	Terry O'Quinn, Jill Schoelen, Shelley Hack	United States	
Stripped to Kill	Katt Shea Ruben	Kay Lenz, Greg Evigan	United States	
Tagos ng Dugo	Mario J. de los Reyes	Vilma Santos, Richard Gomez, Lito Pimentel, Michael de Mesa, Miguel Rodriguez, Joey Marquez, Mark Joseph	Philippines	Thriller drama
The Untouchables	Brian De Palma	Kevin Costner, Sean Connery, Robert De Niro, Andy Garcia, Charles Martin Smith	United States	Crime thriller
White of the Eye	Donald Cammell	David Keith, Cathy Moriarty, Art Evans	United Kingdom	

Title	Director	Cast	Country	Subgenre/Notes
1988
Apartment Zero	Martin Donovan	Colin Firth, Hart Bochner, Dora Bryan	United Kingdom; Argentina	
Betrayed	Costa-Gavras	Debra Winger, Tom Berenger, John Heard	United States	
A Better Tomorrow II	John Woo	Chow Yun-fat, Emily Chu, Waise Lee	Hong Kong	Action thriller
Call Me	Sollace Mitchell	Patricia Charbonneau, Stephen McHattie, Boyd Gaines	United States	
The Cat	Dominik Graf	Götz George, Gudrun Landgrebe, Heinz Hoenig	West Germany	
Cop	James B. Harris	James Woods, Lesley Ann Warren, Charles Durning	United States	
The Dead Pool	Buddy Van Horn	Clint Eastwood, Patricia Clarkson, Liam Neeson	United States	
Dead Ringers	David Cronenberg	Jeremy Irons, Geneviève Bujold, Heidi von Palleske	Canada	Psychological thriller
Die Hard	John McTiernan	Bruce Willis, Alan Rickman, Alexander Godunov, Bonnie Bedelia, Reginald VelJohnson, William Atherton, Paul Gleason, Hart Bochner	United States	Action thriller
The Drifter	Larry Brand	Kim Delaney, Timothy Bottoms, Al Johnson	United States	Crime thriller
Dongalo Massacre	Nilo Saez	Ramon 'Bong' Revilla Jr., Vic Vargas, Michael de Mesa, Ronnie Ricketts, Rachel Anne Wolfe, Philip Gamboa, Baldo Marro, Val Iglesias, Dick Israel, King 'Abdul' Gutierrez	Philippines	Action thriller
Frantic	Roman Polanski	Harrison Ford, Emmanuelle Seigner, Betty Buckley	United States	
Fréquence meurtre	Elisabeth Rappeneau	Catherine Deneuve, André Dussollier, Martin Lamotte	France	
Gawa Na ang Bala Na Papatay sa Iyo	Willy Milan	Fernando Poe Jr., Marianne dela Riva, Vic Vargas	Philippines	Action thriller
Hero and the Terror	William Tannen	Chuck Norris, Brynn Thayer, Steve James	United States	
The House on Carroll Street	Peter Yates	Kelly McGillis, Jeff Daniels, Mandy Patinkin	United States	
Jack's Back	Rowdy Herrington	James Spader, Cynthia Gibb, Roi Loomis	United States	
Kumakasa Kahit Nag-iisa	Nilo Saez	Ronnie Ricketts, Nadia Montenegro, Robin Padilla, George Estregan Jr., Dick Israel	Philippines	Action thriller
Lady in White	Frank LaLoggia	Lukas Haas, Len Cariou, Alex Rocco	United States	
Last Rites	Donald P. Bellisario	Tom Berenger, Daphne Zuniga, Chick Vennera	United States	
Masquerade	Bob Swaim	Rob Lowe, Meg Tilly, Kim Cattrall, Doug Savant	United States	
Messenger of Death	J. Lee Thompson	Charles Bronson, Trish Van Devere, Laurence Luckinbill	United States	
Mississippi Burning	Alan Parker	Gene Hackman, Willem Dafoe, Frances McDormand, Brad Dourif, R. Lee Ermey, Gailard Sartain	United States	Political thriller
Il Nido Del Ragno	Gianfranco Giagni	Ronald Wybenga, Paola Rinaldi, Stéphane Audran	Italy	
Let Sleeping Cops Lie	José Pinheiro	Alain Delon, Michel Serrault, Patrick Catalifo	France	
Nightmare at Noon	Nico Mastorakis	Wings Hauser, Bo Hopkins, George Kennedy	United States	
Pin	Sandor Stern	David Hewlett, Cyndy Preston, John Ferguson	Canada	
Rambo III	Peter MacDonald	Sylvester Stallone, Richard Crenna, Kurtwood Smith	United States	Action thriller
Red Heat	Walter Hill	Arnold Schwarzenegger, James Belushi, Peter Boyle	United States	Action thriller, comedy thriller
Rorret	Fulvio Wetzl	Lou Castel, Anna Galiena, Massimo Venturiello	Italy	
Shoot to Kill	Roger Spottiswoode	Sidney Poitier, Tom Berenger, Kirstie Alley, Clancy Brown, Andrew Robinson	United States	Action thriller
Spellbinder	Janet Greek	Tim Daly, Kelly Preston, Rick Rossovich	United States	
Stormy Monday	Mike Figgis	Melanie Griffith, Tommy Lee Jones, Sting, Sean Bean	United Kingdom	
Talk Radio	Oliver Stone	Eric Bogosian, Alec Baldwin, Ellen Greene, Leslie Hope, John C. McGinley, John Pankow, Michael Wincott	United States	
The Vanishing	George Sluizer	Bernard-Pierre Donnadieu, Gene Bervoets, Johanna ter Steege	Netherlands, France	

Title	Director	Cast	Country	Subgenre/Notes
1989
Arrest: Pat. Rizal Alih – Zamboanga Massacre	Carlo J. Caparas	Ramon Revilla, Vilma Santos, Eddie Garcia, Marianne Dela Riva, Paquito Diaz, Raoul Aragonn, Baldo Marro, Charlie Davao, Rosemarie Gil, Dick Israel	Philippines	Biographical action thriller
Black Rain	Ridley Scott	Michael Douglas, Andy García, Ken Takakura, Kate Capshaw	United States	
Black Rainbow	Mike Hodges	Rosanna Arquette, Jason Robards Jr., Tom Hulce	United Kingdom	
Black Sheep Baby	Leonardo Garcia	Ronnie Ricketts, Monica Herrera, Tony Ferrer	Philippines	Action thriller
Criminal Law	Martin Campbell	Gary Oldman, Kevin Bacon, Tess Harper, Karen Young, Joe Don Baker	United States	
Dead Bang	John Frankenheimer	Don Johnson, Penelope Ann Miller, William Forsythe, Bob Balaban, Tim Reid, Tate Donovan	United States	Action thriller
Dead Calm	Phillip Noyce	Sam Neill, Nicole Kidman, Billy Zane	Australia	
Far From Home	Meiert Avis	Matt Frewer, Drew Barrymore, Richard Masur	United States	
Hit List	William Lustig	Jan-Michael Vincent, Leo Rossi, Lance Henriksen	United States	
Hitcher in the Dark	Umberto Lenzi	Josie Bissett	Italy; United States	
Irosin: Pagputok ng Araw, Babaha ng Dugo	Augusto Buenaventura	Anthony Alonzo, Aga Muhlach, Ricky Davao, Paquito Diaz, Chat Silayan, Monica Herrera, Philip Gamboa, Aurora Sevilla	Philippines	Action thriller
The January Man	Pat O'Connor	Kevin Kline, Susan Sarandon, Mary Elizabeth Mastrantonio, Harvey Keitel, Danny Aiello, Rod Steiger, Alan Rickman	United States	
Johnny Handsome	Walter Hill	Mickey Rourke, Ellen Barkin, Elizabeth McGovern, Forest Whitaker, Lance Henriksen, Morgan Freeman	United States	Crime thriller
Kill Me Again	John Dahl	Val Kilmer, Joanne Whalley, Michael Madsen	United States	
The Killer	John Woo	Chow Yun-fat, Danny Lee, Sally Yeh	Hong Kong	Action thriller
Kinjite: Forbidden Subjects	J. Lee Thompson	Charles Bronson, Perry Lopez, Juan Fernández	United States	
Lethal Weapon 2	Richard Donner	Mel Gibson, Danny Glover, Joe Pesci, Joss Ackland, Patsy Kensit, Derrick O'Connor	United States	Action thriller
Licence to Kill	John Glen	Timothy Dalton, Carey Lowell, Robert Davi, Talisa Soto	United Kingdom	Action thriller
The Master	Tsui Hark	Jet Li	Hong Kong	Action thriller
The Package	Andrew Davis	Gene Hackman, Joanna Cassidy, Tommy Lee Jones	United States	
Posed for Murder	Brian Thomas Jones	Charlotte Helmkamp, Carl Fury, Rick Gianasi	United States	
The Punisher	Mark Goldblatt	Dolph Lundgren, Louis Gossett Jr., Kim Miyori	United States	Action thriller
Santa Sangre	Alejandro Jodorowsky	Axel Jodorowsky, Blanca Guerra, Sabrina Dennison	Italy; Mexico	Psychological thriller
Sea of Love	Harold Becker	Al Pacino, Ellen Barkin, John Goodman	United States	
Ten Little Indians	Alan Birkinshaw	Donald Pleasence, Frank Stallone, Sarah Maur-Thorp	United States	
Tennessee Nights	Nicolas Gessner	Julian Sands, Stacey Dash, Ed Lauter	United States; Switzerland	
Trapped	Fred Walton	Katy Boyer, Bruce Abbott, Kathleen Quinlan	United States	
True Believer	Joseph Ruben	James Woods, Robert Downey Jr., Yuji Okumoto	United States	
Twisted Obsession	Fernando Trueba	Jeff Goldblum, Miranda Richardson, Anémone	France; Spain	
Violent Cop	Beat Takeshi Kitano	Beat Takeshi Kitano, Sei Hiraizumi, Maiko Kawakami	Japan	

== See also ==
- 1980 in film
