= The Vanishing (novel) =

Psychological thriller novella by Tim Krabbé

- First edition English-language cover.
- Author: Tim Krabbé
- Original title: Het Gouden Ei
- Translator: Claire Nicolas White (first English edition)
- Language: Dutch
- Genre: Psychological thriller
- Publisher: Uitgeverij Bert Bakker (first edition); Random House (first English edition)
- Publication date: 1984
- Publication place: Netherlands
- English publication date: 1993
- Media type: Print (Hardback & Paperback)
- ISBN: 0-679-41973-X
- OCLC: 27108902
- Dewey Decimal: 839.3/1364 20
- LC Class: PT5881.21.R26 G6813 1993

The Vanishing (Dutch: Het Gouden Ei, lit. 'The Golden Egg'), is a psychological thriller novella written by Dutch author Tim Krabbé, first published in 1984. The plot centers on a man whose obsession over the fate of his missing lover from years ago drives him to confront her abductor and pay the ultimate sacrifice in order to know the truth. The book was adapted into a 1988 film which was later remade in an English-language version by the same director.

== Synopsis ==
Two lovers, Rex Hofman and Saskia Ehlvest, have traveled to France for a bicycling vacation. As a child Saskia had a nightmare in which she became trapped in a golden orb travelling through space indefinitely, with the only hope of escape an infinitesimal chance of eventual intersection with another such orb (the source of the name of the novel). Rex and Saskia argue about Rex's habit of not keeping the fuel tank filled (additionally the car has a broken fuel gauge), and when the car runs out of gas in the middle of a tunnel, Rex leaves Saskia to fetch more. However when he returns she is terrified because her memory of the nightmare has been refreshed. Rex pulls over at a convenience store to refuel. He and Saskia bury coins to mark the spot, Rex agrees to let Saskia drive (which he has never let her do before), and she goes into the station to buy drinks. She is never seen again.

Eight years later, he is still haunted by her disappearance. He is now in a relationship with another woman named Lieneke, who is both sympathetic to, and frustrated by, the hold that Saskia's disappearance has over him. Despite her misgivings, they become engaged.

At this point the reader is introduced to Raymond Lemorne, the man responsible for whatever happened to Saskia. The novella reveals that Lemorne once saved a young girl from drowning; having proven to himself that he is capable of great goodness, Raymond then begins to wonder if he is capable of an act of pure evil. He then comes up with an idea to murder someone in the most horrible fashion he can imagine. The book follows his meticulous preparations, and his long months of trying to find a suitable victim. This section of the novella ends with him abducting Saskia, but we are still not told what happens to her, though the book does provide clues.

At this point, the narrative switches back to Rex. His obsession with discovering what happened to Saskia has grown to such an extreme that he has taken out a large loan to post advertisements in papers throughout France, hoping that someone might be able to provide him with information. His quest has also driven a wedge into his relationship with Lieneke. One night he is approached by Lemorne, who reveals that he is the one who abducted Saskia, and in a bizarre show of sympathy, he offers to satisfy Rex's determination to discover her ultimate fate, but only if Rex agrees to undergo the same ordeal that Saskia suffered.

After a long discussion between the two men, Rex agrees to Lemorne's proposal, and proceeds to drink a cup of coffee laced with a sedative. He awakens to find himself buried alive, and suffocates while imagining himself finally to be reunited with Saskia.

In the epilogue it is revealed that several newspapers commented upon Rex's mysterious disappearance and its eerie similarity to Saskia's. Their fates are never discovered; it is as if they vanished from the face of the earth.

== Reception ==
Publishers Weekly gave the novel a positive review, saying, "Veteran Dutch author Krabbe works with an economy that only reinforces the terror inspired by his scarifying tale."

== Publishing history ==
In 1993, an English translation by Claire Nicolas White was released under the title The Vanishing (Random House, ISBN 0-679-41973-X). A new English translation of the novel, by Sam Garrett, was published in October 2003 (Bloomsbury, ISBN 0-7475-6533-3 ).

== Dramatisations ==
The novella was adapted by George Sluizer (from a script by Krabbé) into the award-winning 1988 film Spoorloos (international title: The Vanishing), which starred Bernard-Pierre Donnadieu as Raymond Lemorne, Gene Bervoets as Rex Hofman, Johanna ter Steege in a European Film Award winning performance as Saskia (whose surname was changed to Wagter), and Gwen Eckhaus as Lieneke.

An English-language remake was released in 1993, again directed by Sluizer. This version, which starred Jeff Bridges, Kiefer Sutherland, Nancy Travis, and Sandra Bullock, failed to match the acclaim of the original film, probably due to an altered ending where Jeff (Rex's counterpart) is rescued and the abductor is killed.

BBC Radio 4 presented an adaptation directed by Kirsty Williams starring Samuel West as part of their Saturday Play series in 2010 – see The Vanishing (radio play).
