= Hendrik Maarten Krabbé =

Dutch painter (1868–1931)

Heinrich Maarten Krabbe
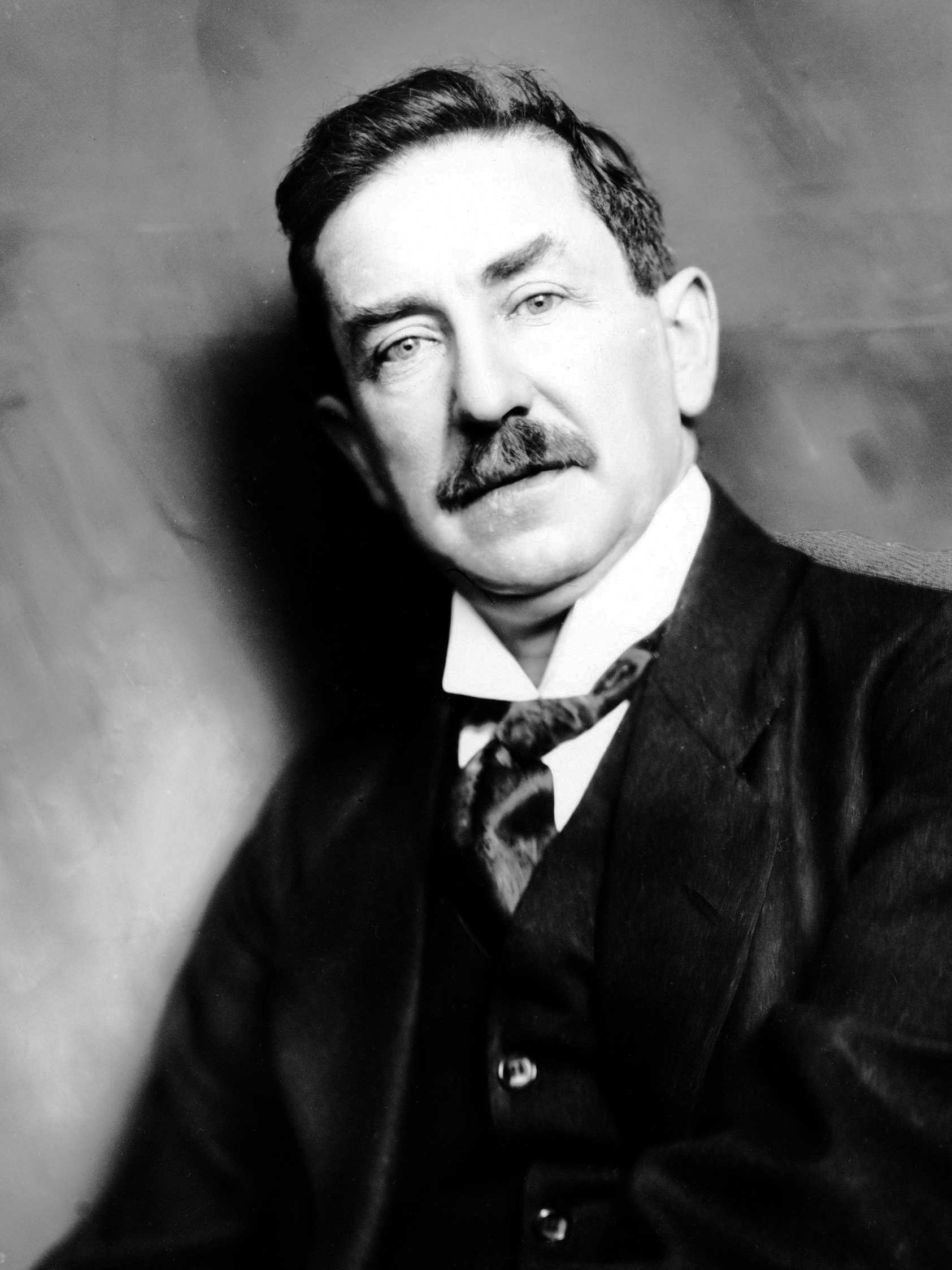
- Hendrik Maarten Krabbé (date unknown)
- Born: 4 May 1868; London, England
- Died: 22 December 1931 (aged 63); Amsterdam, Netherlands
- Other name: Heinrich Martin Krabbé
- Occupation: Artist

Hendrik Maarten Krabbé, or Heinrich Martin Krabbé (4 May 1868, London – 22 December 1931, Amsterdam) was a Dutch genre artist and portrait painter.

== Biography ==
His father worked as a claims examiner for a life insurance company. From 1883 to 1888, he attended the Quellinusschool and the Rijksakademie in Amsterdam, where he studied painting with August Allebé and lithography with Rudolf Stang. After graduating, he lived in Bussum for several years then taught at the School of applied arts in Haarlem from 1896 to 1906.

Among his best-known students were Arnold Willem Kort and Ina Scholten-van Heek. After 1906, he took up residence at the artists' colony in Laren. During this time, he married the singer Miep Rust (1874-1956). From 1916 to 1923 he was back in Bussum, but spent 1920 on a study trip in Chicago.

He initially painted genre scenes, military personnel and interiors with figures. For the last twenty years of his life, he focused on portraits. He was a long-standing member of Arti et Amicitiae. In the late 1920s, he retired to Amsterdam and died there in 1931.

His son, Maarten, became one of the best known Dutch painters of the 20th century. Maarten's youngest son, Mirko, is also a painter; his middle son, Jeroen, is an actor and director; and his eldest is the writer Tim Krabbé. Jeroen's son Jasper is also an artist.

== Selected paintings ==
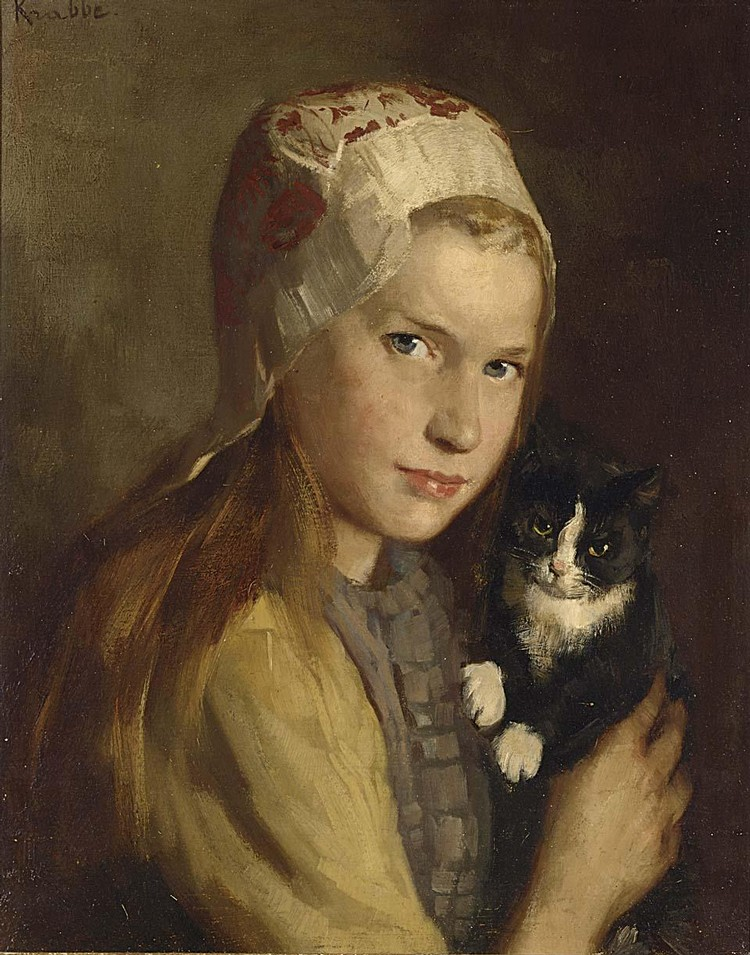
A Girl with her Cat

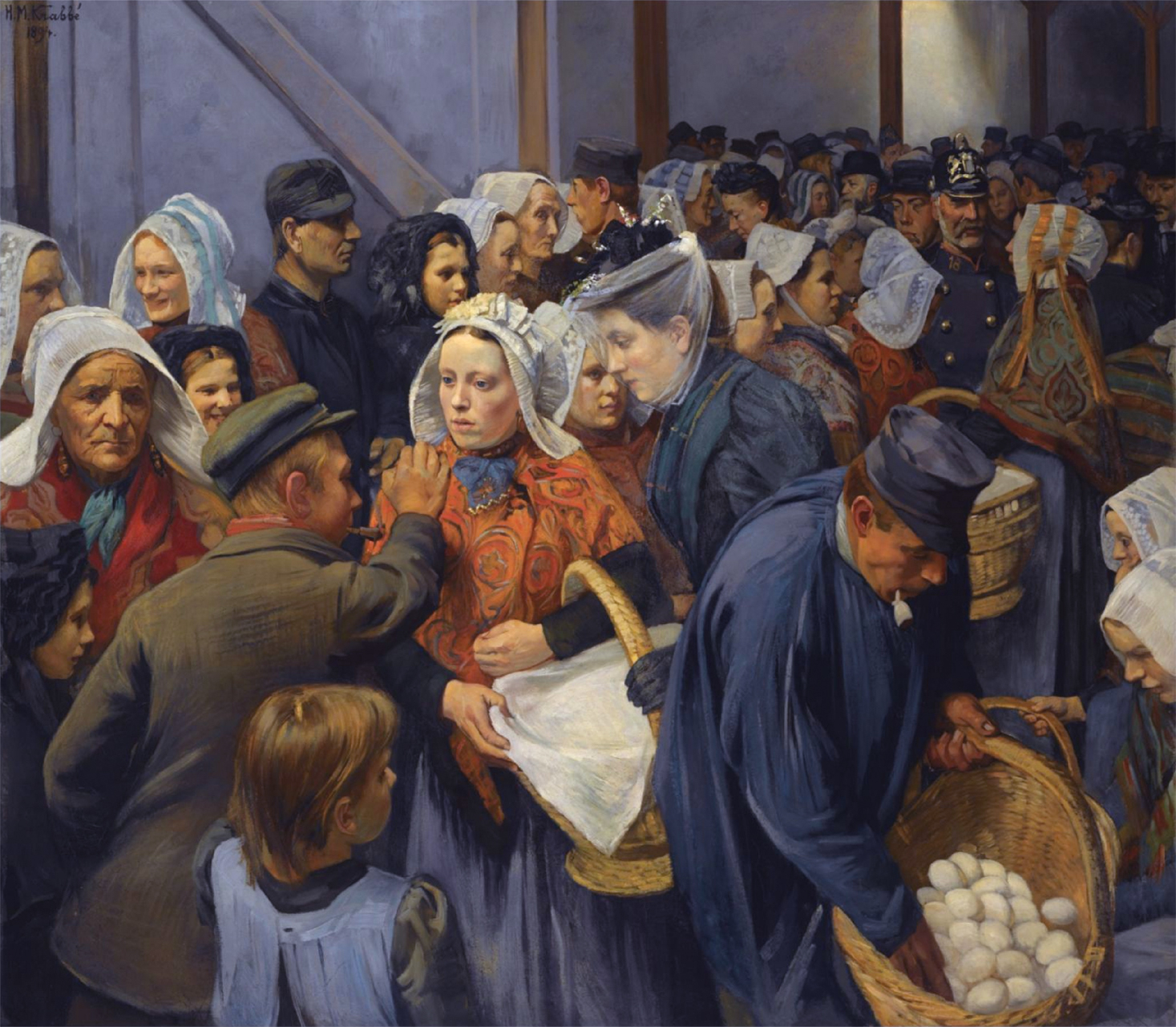
At the Market in Brabant

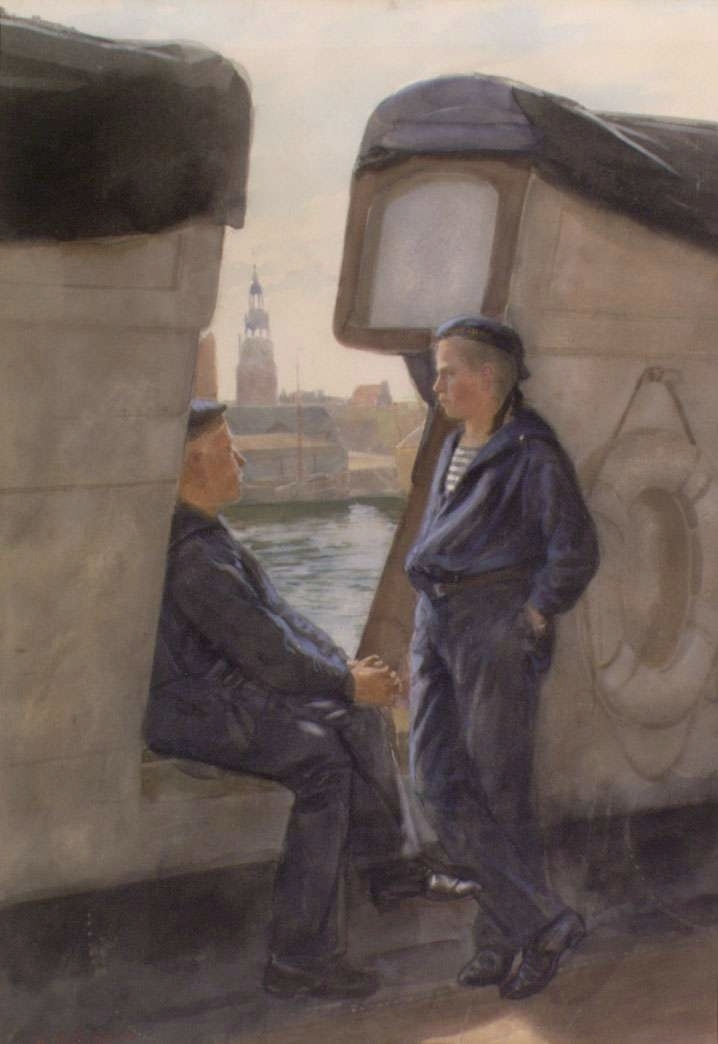
Two Sailors

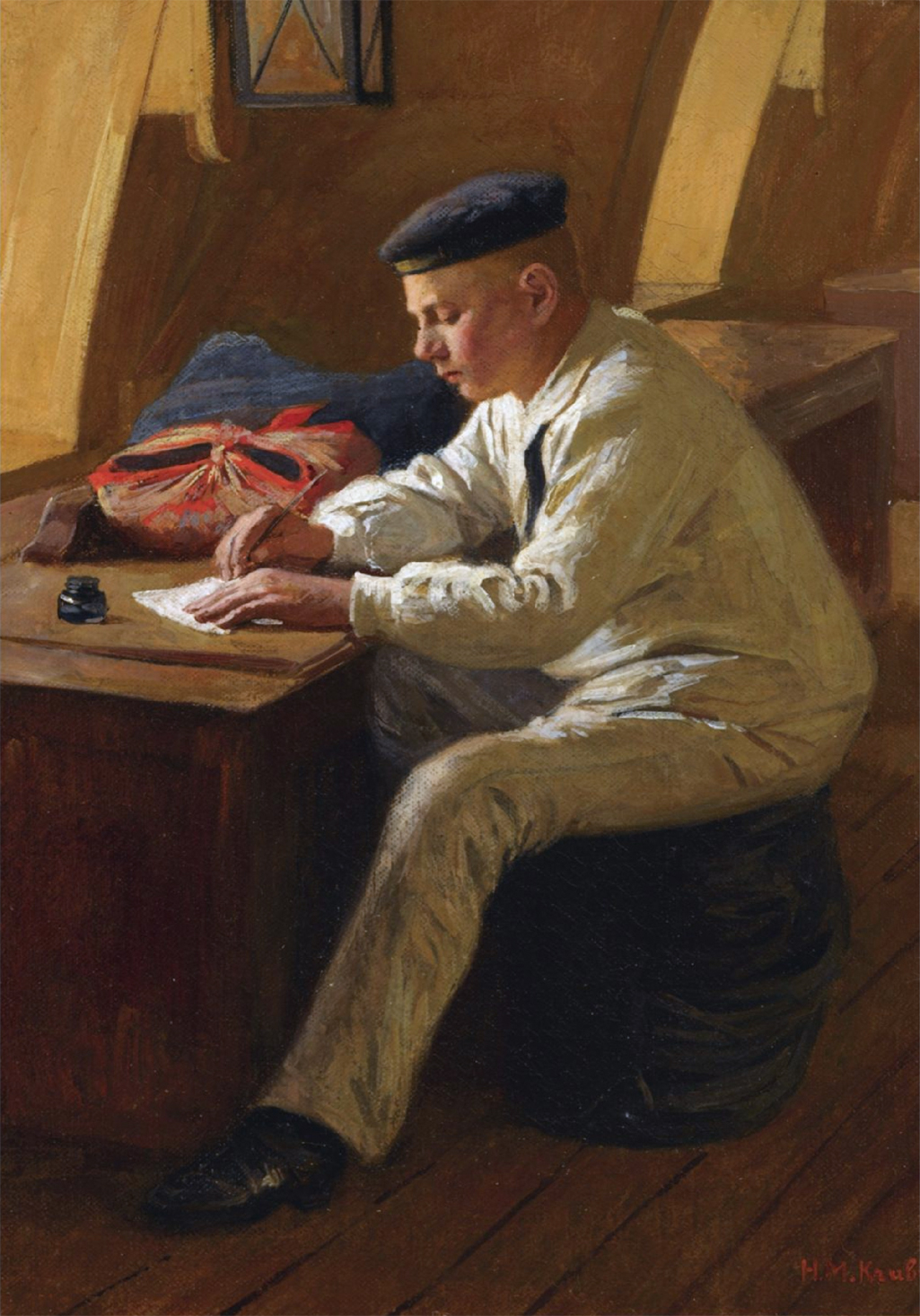
The Letter Home

== Writings ==
- Handleiding voor het teekenen en schilderen, Van Holkema & Warendorff, 1903
