= Carl Friedman =

Dutch writer and columnist (1952–2020)

- Born: Carolina Klop; 29 April 1952; Eindhoven, Netherlands
- Died: 27 March 2020 (aged 67); Amsterdam, Netherlands
- Occupation: Author

Carl Friedman, pseudonym of Carolina Klop (29 April 1952 – 27 March 2020) was a Dutch author.

== Biography ==
Friedman grew up in Eindhoven, in a catholic family. She became interested in World War II from a young age. She began collecting war documents at 15. Her interest may have been driven by the fact that her father was a resistance fighter and interned at Sachsenhausen concentration camp prior to liberation.

After her secondary studies, Friedman began working as a translator and interpreter. She moved to Breda, and worked at a daily newspaper called De Stem. She began her writing career in 1991 with the novel Nightfather, which became a success and was adapted for television in 1995. It has been translated into many languages.

== Books ==
- Nightfather (1991)
- The Shovel and the Loom (1993)
  - Of this book was made the film: Left Luggage directed by Jeroen Krabbé.
- The Gray Lover (2003)
- Wie heeft de meeste joden (2004)
