= Maarten Krabbé =

Dutch painter and art educator

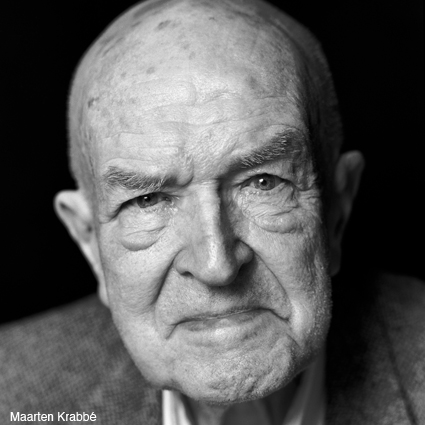
- Born: 22 February 1908; Laren, Netherlands
- Died: 18 February 2005 (aged 96); Amsterdam, Netherlands
- Known for: Painting

Maarten Krabbé (22 February 1908 – 18 February 2005) was a Dutch painter and art educator.

== Early life ==
Krabbé is the son of painter Hendrik Maarten Krabbé (1868–1931) and singer Miep Rust (1874–1956). His sisters were Henny Eskens-Krabbé (who was a resistance fighter in World War II) and Lies van Buren-Krabbé.

Krabbé grew up in the Gooi, greatly enjoying being surrounded by nature. This would manifest itself in his art work later on in life. In 1913 he moved with his family to Bussum and in 1922 to Zandvoort.

After three years in high school (HBS) in Haarlem, his father gave him his blessing to become a painter. He then enrolled at the National Academy for the Visual Arts (Rijksacademie voor Beeldende Kunsten) in Amsterdam from 1926–1930.

In his youth Krabbé studied the Face Book (Gelatenboek) by Petrus Camper (1780) and found his inspiration as a painter in Cubism, children's drawings, René Gockinga (1893–1962) and Aubrey Beardsley. When still quite young he discovered the experimental technique of automatic drawing – finding shapes in accidental lines. He was also very sensitive to the power of words, corresponding with writers and poets including Frederik van Eeden, Dulac, Dr. Paul Gachet who was physician to Vincent van Gogh, Simon Carmiggelt, and fellow-painter Melle Oldeboerrigter.

== Style and works ==
As a mature artist, Krabbé explores styles and compositions of well-known colleagues. He produces paintings, etchings, drawings, gouaches in the styles of Cézanne, Matisse, Géricault, Picasso, Doré, Vuillard and Klee, but made with a style of liveliness that characterizes all of his work. Krabbé painted portraits by commission, among which is one of the family members of Vincent van Gogh. In the war years of 1940–1945, the now famous series of etchings was created on the subject of Miguel de Cervantes' early 17th century novel Don Quixote. After the war, these 18 etchings found their way to the Museo Casa Natal de Cervantes in Spain and just before his death eight masterly oil paintings on the same subject went to the same museum. In 1949 he created drawings and gouaches for the Bible. In the 1970s he painted a series of 72 gouaches on themes from One Thousand and One Nights. His later paintings, such as the Gardens intend to create a powerful atmosphere of color and optimism, reminiscent of a younger painter.

== Educator ==
Krabbé developed into an important art educator, an innovator of drawing education for children. His thesis was that one should take the children's own poetry as point of departure. By way of exploring techniques as an adventure and with his own poetic stories he created an unlimited space of fantasy for children from which they could create. For example:

"There are trees that dream of undertaking faraway journeys. Therefore they stand very straight and tall, hoping they will be selected to be the mast of a ship. On the other hand there are trees that are thoroughly content with the little plot of land they grow on. They bend and bow in every direction to see as much as possible of what happens on their little plot. They are bent and gnarled. Other trees look like they are shouting; 'Hooray!' They stretch their arms up to the sun, the clouds and the heavens…”

He wrote many publications on art education for children in elementary school and high school, as well as for students of the teachers' colleges. His lectures throughout the Netherlands generated great enthusiasm because of his open, creative approach concerning art and children. Among others, he taught at the Kohnstamm School and the Adult Education Centre of Amsterdam. In the mid-1950s Krabbé had a TV programme in which he taught children how to draw.

== Selected exhibitions ==
- Gallerie Tswin, Zwijndrecht (1968)
- De Hoogovens, IJmuiden (1968)
- Singer Museum. Laren. 'Drie generaties Krabbé' (1985)
- Pictura, Dordrecht (1993)
- Krakeling, Amsterdam 'Eye Love Books' (1997)
- Voerman Museum, Hattem, 'Familieverbanden' (2000)
- Museum Casa Natal de Cervantes, Alcala de Henares, Spanje (2004)
- Museum Jan van der Togt, Amstelveen (2008)

== Selected collections ==
- Don Quichote (1947). Series of etchings (18 sheets acquired by the Biblioteca Nacional de Madrid and currently in possession of the Casa Natal de Cervantes in Alcala de Henares, Spain
- Stedelijk Museum, Amsterdam
- Rijksmuseum, Amsterdam
- Joods Historisch Museum Amsterdam (Jewish Historical Museum)
- Koninklijke Bibliotheek, Den Haag (Royal Library)

== Selected writings ==
- Education and Art, Kroniek van Kunst en Kultuur18e jaargang, no.6, 1955 (Unesco)
- Muizen en bokken houden veel van Papier ("Mice and Billy goats very much like paper") (Proost, Amsterdam, 1955)
- Het Schema, Parnas, tijdschrift over de Vormgeving (Journal of Design) no.2 1956
- Verborgen Mogelijkheden (8 delen), uitbeeldingsmogelijkheden voor jonge handen (Sijthoff, Leiden 1961)
- Het Venster Open, ("The Open Window") Kompasreeks, 2e serie, no. 5 (Samson, 1963)
- Beeld in, Beeld uit, Bouwstenen voor creatieve expressie en muzische vorming ("Image in, Image out" building blocks for creative expression and artistic education) Redactie P. Dijkstra (Gottmer, Haarlem 1970)

== Selected illustrations ==
- De Artapappa's door J.B. Schuil (1936)
- Honderd vertellingen uit de Bijbel, naverteld door Anne de Vries ("A Hundred stories from the Bible") (Van Goor, Den Haag, 1949)

== Selected publications ==
- Het Bevrijdende Beeld; genezende en scheppende werking der Expressie. ("The Liberating Image; the healing and creative effects of expression") Trouw, 20 October 1955.
- Leerlingen geven kleur en fleur aan de Rembrandtschool. ("Pupils bring color and cheer to the Rembrandt school") Haagse Courant, 15 June 1959.
- Drie generaties Krabbé. ("Three Krabbé Generations") Bibeb en Frans Keijsper (Van Holkema & Warendorp, Weesp, 1985)
- Krabbé in Drievoud. ("Krabbé in triplicate") Panorama, 18 April 1985.
- Catalogue Museo Casa Natal de Cervantes, Alcala de Henares, Spain, 2003.
- De vrije expressie op school. ("Free expression in school. An obituary") In memory of Maartje den Breejen. Het Parool, 26 February 2005.

== Personal life ==
Krabbé married Margreet Reiss, a writer and translator. They had two sons: Tim, a published author, cyclist and chess player; and Jeroen, a film actor, director and painter. In the mid-1950s, they were divorced and in 1959 he married his second wife, Helena Verschuur. They had a son, designer and painter, Mirko.

== Cultural influence ==
Filmmaker Louis van Gasteren used Maarten Krabbé's works on Don Quixote in 2008 and poet Frank Starik wrote a memorial poem.
