= Left Luggage (film) =

1998 Dutch drama film

- DVD cover
- Directed by: Jeroen Krabbé
- Written by: Edwin de Vries
- Based on: The Shovel and the Loom by Carl Friedman
- Produced by: Ate de Jong; Hans Pos; Dave Schram
- Starring: Isabella Rossellini; Laura Fraser; Adam Monty; Jeroen Krabbé
- Cinematography: Walther Vanden Ende
- Edited by: Edgar Burcksen
- Music by: Henny Vrienten
- Production companies: Shooting Star Filmcompany; Flying Dutchman Productions; VARA
- Distributed by: PolyGram Filmed Entertainment
- Release date: 30 March 1998
- Running time: 100 minutes
- Country: Netherlands
- Languages: English, Hebrew, Yiddish

Left Luggage is a 1998 Dutch drama film directed by Jeroen Krabbé.

== Plot ==
While escaping Nazis during World War II, a Jewish man buries in the ground two suitcases full of things dear to his heart. The war deprived him of his family and afterwards he endlessly turns over the soil of Antwerp to find the suitcases. It's an obsessive compulsion. He keeps checking old maps and keeps digging, trying to find what he lost. His daughter Chaya is a beautiful, modern girl looking for a part-time job. She finds a place as a nanny in a strictly observant Hasidic family with many children, although her secular manners clearly fly in the face of their beliefs. One of the reasons she is accepted is that the mother of the family is absolutely overburdened by the household, so Chaya stays despite the resistance of the father, who is normally the indisputable authority in the family.

She develops a special bond with the youngest of the boys, four-year-old Simcha, who seems incapable of speaking. While walking in the park she encourages him to speak and it appears that, after some coaching from Chaya (who needs coaching herself), during the upcoming Passover Seder Simcha will be able to chant the section of the Haggadah usually reserved for the youngest speaking participant—the Four Questions.

At first, Simcha's nerves prevent him from chanting, and his brothers begin to chant instead. Simcha finally lifts his voice. The entire family, including Chaya, applauds his efforts, but his judgmental father does not recognize this great step but, instead, criticizes the boy for a mistake. Chaya confronts the father and, in the process, discovers his own pain as a Holocaust survivor and begins to understand her own parents' grief.

The antisemitic superintendent of the building is a constant problem for the entire family and now for Chaya. However, as opposed to the observant Jews, she refuses to be a victim and does not put up with his antisemitic tricks. She fights him, thus exciting the children's admiration and father's wrath.

Unfortunately, walks with Simcha end in a tragedy: after sneaking to the park, he drowns in the pond while chasing the ducks he loved so much. Some in the community hold Chaya responsible for his death. However, in a scene where Chaya goes to the family's mourning service, the mother feels compassion for Chaya and realizes that Chaya felt a deep connection with Simcha. As an act of acceptance, his mother rips Chaya's shirt, which is a sign of a mourner (a sibling, parent, child or spouse of the deceased) in Jewish tradition.

The boy's father finally, albeit silently, acknowledges Chaya's connection with Simcha when she observes the graveside service.

Chaya's experience allows her to finally accept her parents' past and to embrace her own Jewishness.

The film is a commentary not only on external (gentile) antisemitism, but also on the lack of connection and self-acceptance of assimilated Jews.

== Cast ==
- Laura Fraser as Chaya Silberschmidt
- Adam Monty as Simcha Kalman
- Isabella Rossellini as Mrs. Kalman
- Jeroen Krabbé as Mr. Kalman
- Chaim Topol as Yacov Apfelschnitt
- Marianne Sägebrecht as Mrs. Silberschmidt
- Maximilian Schell as Mr. Silberschmidt
  - Koen De Bouw as Mr. Silberschmidt (at age of 20)
- David Bradley - Concierge
- Heather Weeks as Sofie
- Miriam Margolyes as Mrs. Goldman
- Lex Goudsmit as Mr. Goldman

== Awards ==
The film was entered into the 48th Berlin International Film Festival, where the film won the Blue Angel Award and Isabella Rossellini won an Honourable Mention.

== See also ==
- List of Holocaust films
