= The Vanishing (1993 film) =

- Theatrical release poster
- Directed by: George Sluizer
- Screenplay by: Todd Graff
- Based on: Het Gouden Ei; 1984 novel by Tim Krabbé
- Produced by: Larry Brezner; Pieter Jan Brugge
- Starring: Jeff Bridges; Kiefer Sutherland; Nancy Travis; Sandra Bullock
- Cinematography: Peter Suschitzky
- Edited by: Bruce Green
- Music by: Jerry Goldsmith
- Distributed by: 20th Century Fox
- Release date: February 5, 1993
- Running time: 109 minutes
- Country: United States
- Language: English
- Budget: $20 million
- Box office: $14,543,394

The Vanishing is a 1993 American psychological thriller horror film directed by George Sluizer and starring Jeff Bridges, Kiefer Sutherland, Nancy Travis, and Sandra Bullock. It is a remake of Sluizer's 1988 French-Dutch film of the same name.

== Plot ==
The film begins with chemistry professor Barney Cousins at his cabin, seemingly perfecting methods to conduct a kidnapping. He is so dedicated to his work that his wife Helene and his daughter Denise suspect he is having an affair.

Jeff Harriman goes on vacation with his girlfriend Diane Shaver, who vanishes at a gas station. Three years later, Jeff has become obsessed with finding out what happened, posting fliers and following leads. Exhausted, he stops at a diner and meets a waitress named Rita who sympathizes with his plight and looks after him. A year later, the two are a couple and have settled in an apartment in Seattle. Jeff, who is attempting to write a novel, meets with a publisher who suggests that he write a book about the disappearance. Knowing this will upset Rita, he hides his project, buys a used military uniform, and uses army reserve drills as a cover to continue his search. One weekend, Rita accesses Jeff's computerized rough draft of a book and discovers it's about Diane's disappearance. Rita tracks Jeff to his motel room and angrily confronts him. Jeff finally tells the truth about how Diane disappeared. Following Rita's ultimatum, he abandons his search for Diane.

Some months later, Barney is on campus and discovers Diane's missing posters covered with other fliers. He surmises that Jeff has given up his quest and baits him by sending him a letter to meet him at a country club to learn the truth about Diane, which Jeff does. While Barney secretly watches, Rita confronts Jeff again and tells him they are done. She records an outgoing answering machine message at their home, indicating that she has broken up with Jeff. When Jeff returns, he changes the message without Rita knowing. Barney arrives at Jeff's door and admits that he was responsible for Diane's disappearance. He promises to show Jeff what happened to Diane if he agrees to go through exactly the same thing she did. Barney explains about his past and how he once saved a girl from drowning. This experience led him to an epiphany: With capability of great good also, could there come capability of great evil? The kidnapping of Diane was an attempt to answer that hypothesis.

In flashbacks, the build-up to the crime is shown: when Diane was in the gas station purchasing drinks, she compliments a bracelet that Barney is wearing. He claims to sell them and invites her to his car so she can buy one. In his car, Barney uses chloroform to subdue and kidnap her. Then Jeff is taken to the gas station where Diane went missing and is told that if he drinks a cup of drugged coffee, he will discover her fate by experiencing it. He does and wakes up buried in a coffin.

Rita calls home and listens to the changed outgoing message on the answering machine, which had incidentally recorded Barney's voice when he confronted Jeff. Realizing that Jeff is in danger, she talks with a neighbor who witnessed the attack. She learns of Barney's identity, goes to his home, and meets his daughter Denise. Not knowing the circumstances, Denise rides with Rita and gives her directions to her father's cabin. When Rita arrives, a violent fight ensues with Barney gaining the upper hand. He offers Rita the same deal that he offers Jeff, but Rita lies that she has kidnapped Denise. She gets Barney to drink drugged coffee but does not realize that the drug takes 15 minutes to take effect. She goes in search of Jeff and finds a fresh mound of dirt. She digs him out but is thwarted at the last minute by Barney. Jeff climbs out of the grave, kills Barney with the shovel, and embraces Rita. He sees another grave and finally accepts Diane's death. Jeff and Rita reunite as a couple and sell the story as a novel to a publishing company.

== Cast ==
- Jeff Bridges as Barney Cousins
- Kiefer Sutherland as Jeff Harriman, a man who's trying to find what happened to his girlfriend, Diane
- Nancy Travis as Rita Baker, Jeff's new girlfriend after Diane vanishes
- Sandra Bullock as Diane Shaver, Jeff's girlfriend who vanishes without a trace
- Park Overall as Lynn
- Maggie Linderman as Denise Cousins, Barney's daughter
- Lisa Eichhorn as Helene Cousins, Barney's wife
- George Hearn as Arthur Bernard
- Lynn Hamilton as Miss Carmichael

== Production ==
Principal photography began on April 6, 1992. Initial filming took place in a studio located in Los Angeles before moving to location shooting in Seattle and Mt. St. Helens, WA. Barney's cabin was in actuality a cabin in Snohomish, WA owned by Boy Scouts of America and the Mini-Mart was located in North Bend, WA which was also the filming location of many exteriors for Twin Peaks.

== Release ==
The Vanishing was released in theatres on February 5, 1993, in 1,656 theatres. For its opening weekend, it landed at #4 at the box office grossing $5.0 million. It grossed $6.2 million in its first week. For the second weekend, it dropped to #7, grossing $3.5 million. Finally in its third weekend, it dropped out of the top-ten charts to #14, grossing $1.4 million. After three weeks in theatres, the film eventually made $12.3 million, giving a total of $14.5 million. It was considered to be a box office bomb, and failed to earn back its $20 million budget.

== Reception ==
This remake received a mixed reaction and was frequently compared poorly to the original, particularly for its happy ending. Variety called it "schematic and unconvincing", and Time Out's Nigel Floyd called it "a misjudged, lobotomized Hollywood remake." Mark Kermode summarized: "The original was about the banality of evil, but the remake became about the evil of banality. It was a mess." The Washington Post called it "a case study in how Hollywood can make a complete mess out of what was previously a marvelous film." Roger Ebert gave the film 1 star out of 4, writing, "The movie methodically rewrote all that was good in the earlier version, turning its cold logic into trashy commercialism. The first movie was existential in its merciless unfolding. This one turns into a slasher movie with a cheap joke at the end." Desson Howe called the film "an inept, quasi-formulaic rehash of everything."

Salon named the film as the worst remake of all time.

On Rotten Tomatoes the film holds a 49% rating based on 37 reviews, with an average rating of 5.20/10. The consensus summarizes: "The Vanishing copies the form of its pulse-pounding predecessor but loses much of its thrilling function along the way, leaving American audiences with one more rote remake." On Metacritic, the film has a weighted average score of 49 out of 100 based on 17 critics, indicating "mixed or average reviews".

== See also ==
- Ted Bundy – a serial killer wearing an arm sling and plaster cast, driving a European car
