= Rudolf Stang =

German engraver and etcher (1831-1927)

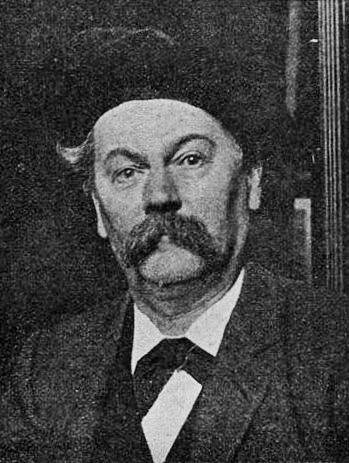
- Born: 26 November 1831
- Died: 2 January 1927 (aged 95)
- Occupation: Engraver

Rudolf Stang (26 November 1831, Düsseldorf - 2 January 1927, Boppard), was a German engraver and etcher associated with the Düsseldorfer Malerschule.

== Life and work ==
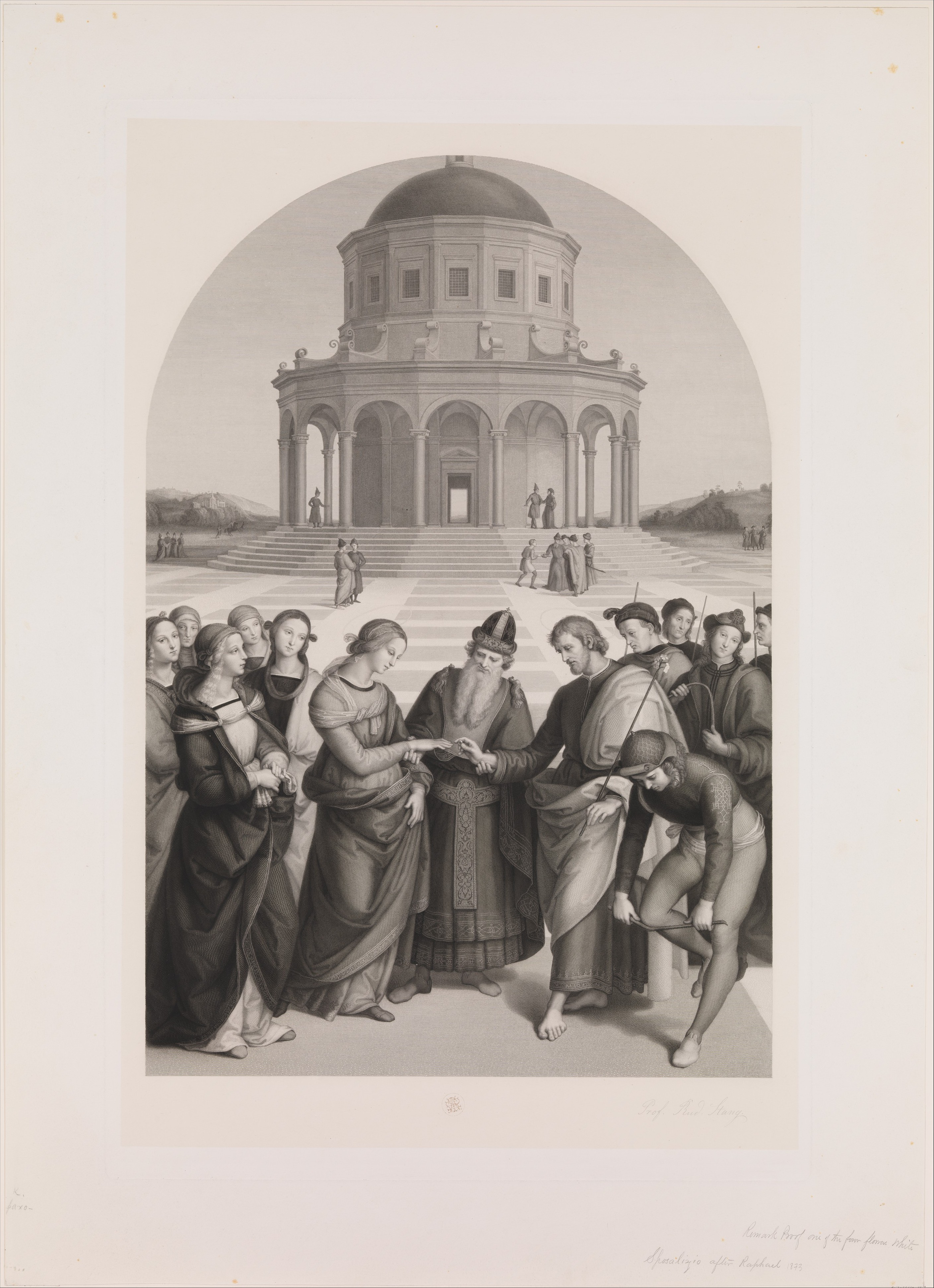
The Marriage of the Virgin

He was the son of Jakob Stang, a former teacher who became a winemaker and bar owner, and his wife, Franziska née Denz. The bar, "Zum Drachenfels", was a meeting place for the local artistic community, including the composer brothers, Friedrich and Norbert Burgmüller, and the poets, Christian Dietrich Grabbe and Karl Immermann. His father died when he was only nine. After renting rooms in their home for six years, his mother was forced to sell it at an auction.

He was initially trained to be a stonemason but, in 1845, began attending the Kunstakademie Düsseldorf, where his primary instructor was the copper engraver, Joseph von Keller. After two years, he began making plates for small andachtsbilder (devotional images), on behalf of the Association for the Dissemination of Religious Images. His first full engraving of his own was one of the Annunciation, based on a work by Ernst Deger, at Stolzenfels Castle. He graduated from the Kunstakademie in 1857.

Shortly after, he became a member of the progressive artists' association, Malkasten, and began taking private students; notably Andreas Pickel. Through his sister, Maria, he became the brother-in-law of the engraver Nikolaus Barthelmess and the uncle of Rudolf Barthelmess, who would later be a portrait painter.

From 1865 to 1874, he made several trips to Italy. The academies in Berlin, Munich, and Brussels named him a member, for his engraving, "The Marriage of the Virgin", after a work by Raphael, which he made following a visit to Milan in 1873. The following year, he did an engraving of "The Last Supper", by Leonardo da Vinci.

In 1881, he was appointed Professor of copper engraving at the Rijksakademie in Amsterdam. His best-known students there included Hendrik Maarten Krabbé, Thérèse Schwartze and Willem Witsen. In 1898 and 1899, he designed two stamps for PTT Nederland (the Dutch post office), one of which was in honor of young Queen Wilhelmina, who had recently come of age to rule independently. He retired in 1901 and went to live in Boppard, where he became a painter, as his eyes had weakened too much to do engraving. He died there in 1927, aged ninety-five.

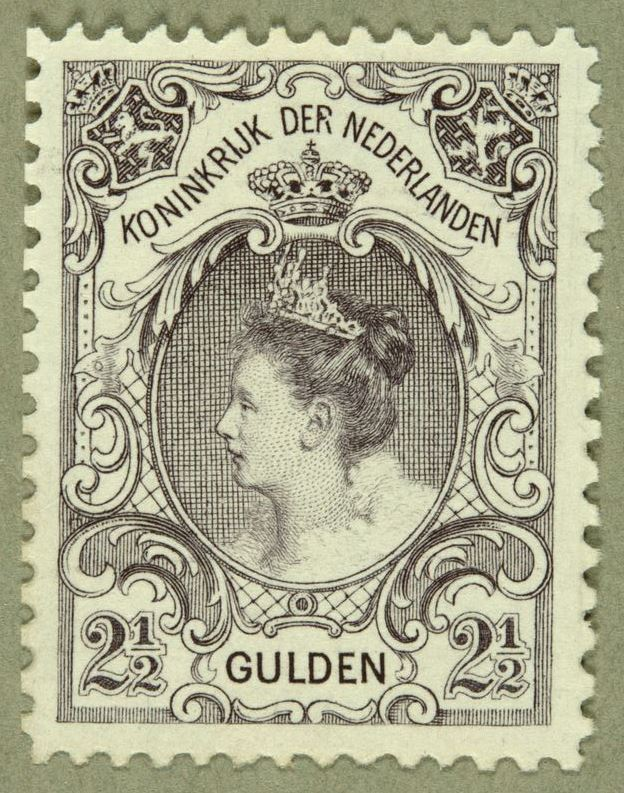
Queen Wilhelmina stamp (1898)
