= The Vanishing (1988 film) =

Dutch film by George Sluzier

- Dutch theatrical release poster
- Directed by: George Sluizer
- Screenplay by: George Sluizer; Tim Krabbé
- Based on: The Vanishing by Tim Krabbé
- Produced by: Anne Lordon; George Sluizer
- Starring: Bernard-Pierre Donnadieu; Gene Bervoets; Johanna ter Steege; Gwen Eckhaus
- Cinematography: Toni Kuhn
- Edited by: George Sluizer; Lin Friedman
- Music by: Henny Vrienten
- Production companies: Golden Egg Films; Ingrid Productions; MGS Film
- Distributed by: The Movies/Meteor Film (Netherlands); Argos Films (France)
- Release dates: 27 October 1988 (Netherlands); 20 December 1989 (France)
- Running time: 106 minutes
- Countries: Netherlands; France
- Languages: Dutch; French; English
- Budget: US$165,000

The Vanishing (Dutch: Spoorloos, literally: "Without a Trace" or "Traceless"; French: L'homme qui voulait savoir, literally: "The Man Who Wanted to Know") is a 1988 psychological thriller film co-written and directed by George Sluizer, and starring Bernard-Pierre Donnadieu, Gene Bervoets, and Johanna ter Steege in her feature film debut. The film recounts a man's obsessive years-long search for his girlfriend after she mysteriously disappears from a rest area in the French countryside. The screenplay was adapted by Sluizer and Tim Krabbé from Krabbé's 1984 novella.

A co-production between the Netherlands and France, The Vanishing was filmed mostly on location in Nîmes.

The film was theatrically released in the Netherlands on 27 October 1988, with a French release following on 20 December 1989. It received positive reviews from film critics, with praise for its tension, performances, and psychological horror elements. The film was particularly well-received in the United States, where it was named the Top Foreign Film of the Year by the National Board of Review, as well as receiving nominations from the National Society of Film Critics and New York Film Critics Circle. The film was selected as the Dutch submission for the Academy Award for Best Foreign Language Film in 1988, but was disqualified after the Academy of Motion Picture Arts and Sciences determined it featured too much French dialogue for it to adequately represent the Netherlands.

Sluizer remade the film in English in 1993.

== Plot ==
A young Dutch couple, Rex and Saskia, are on holiday in France. As they drive, Saskia shares a recurring dream in which she is drifting through space in a golden egg. In the most recent dream, another egg containing another person appeared; she feels the collision of the two eggs would signify the end of something.

Their car runs out of petrol and they stop at a rest area. Rex promises to never abandon Saskia, and they bury two coins at the base of a tree as a symbol of their romance and commitment. Saskia enters the petrol station to buy drinks and does not return. Rex frantically searches for her.

Some time earlier, Raymond, a wealthy family man, secretly plots to abduct a woman. He buys an isolated house, experiments with chloroform, and rehearses methods of enticing women into his car. When his initial attempts at abduction fail, he poses as an injured motorist in need of assistance and goes to the rest area out of town, where he will not be recognised.

Three years after Saskia's disappearance, Rex is still searching for her. He has received several postcards inviting him to meet the kidnapper at a cafe in Nîmes, but the kidnapper never comes. Unknown to Rex, the cafe is directly opposite Raymond's apartment, where he watches Rex wait. Rex's new girlfriend, Lieneke, reluctantly helps him search for Saskia. One day, Rex has a dream similar to Saskia's in which he is trapped in a golden egg. Unable to endure his obsession, Lieneke leaves him.

Rex makes a public appeal on television, saying he only wants to know the truth about what happened to Saskia. Raymond confronts Rex and admits to the kidnapping; he says he will reveal what happened to her if Rex comes with him. As they drive, Raymond admits to his own psychopathy, saying he has known from a young age that he has no conscience, and is therefore capable of anything. After saving a young girl from drowning, he resolved to commit the worst crime he could imagine in order to test if he was worthy of his daughter's admiration; in his view, one can only be a truly good person if one is capable of doing something evil, but chooses not to do it. Raymond describes how he kidnapped Saskia at the rest stop by posing as a traveling salesman and enticing her into his car, whereby he trapped her.

Late that night, Raymond and Rex arrive at the desolate rest area. Raymond dismisses Rex's threats of police action, saying there is no evidence connecting him to the crime. Pouring them a cup of coffee, Raymond tells Rex the only way to learn what happened to Saskia is to experience it himself. As Raymond waits in the car, Rex rages, unsure of what to do. After digging up the coins he and Saskia buried years earlier, he drinks his coffee, which has been drugged. He awakens some time later, buried alive in a box underground.

Raymond relaxes on the patio of his country home, surrounded by his wife and children. A newspaper sitting in his car features a headline about the double disappearance of Saskia and Rex, with their portraits in two egg-shaped ovals.

== Cast ==
- Bernard-Pierre Donnadieu as Raymond Lemorne
- Gene Bervoets as Rex Hofman
- Johanna ter Steege as Saskia Wagter
- Gwen Eckhaus as Lieneke
- Bernadette Le Saché as Simone Lemorne
- Tania Latarjet as Denise Lemorne
- Lucille Glenn as Gabrielle Lemorne

== Production ==
=== Writing ===
Before working on The Vanishing, Sluizer became familiar with journalist Tim Krabbé through his articles about filmmaking in the United States. These articles eventually became a novel, which Sluizer adapted into his film Red Desert Penitentiary (1985). After Red Desert Penitentiary, Krabbé began writing a novel called Het Gouden Ei (lit. The Golden Egg). As the film was set in France, Krabbé asked Sluizer about names of towns, and Sluizer advised him on town names as well as family names. Sluizer had access to the early manuscripts of the novel, and after reading the first few chapters he stated that he wanted to buy the film rights.

Krabbé initially offered to write the script for Sluizer after he had finished the book. Sluizer described the script's first draft as "not bad, but not good" and wrote the second draft with Krabbé. The two worked on a third draft together, and Sluizer stated they began to have what he described as a "difference of opinion" over what should happen in the film, the placing of scenes, and how to dramatically tell the story. Sluizer stopped working with Krabbé, stating that he had bought the film rights and he would finish the script himself, which angered Krabbé. The completed film accurately portrays the narrative within the novel, apart from two factors: first, the film's narrative is more complicated than that of the novel, making extensive use of flashbacks and gradually revealing personality traits of the central characters; and, second, Rex and Raymond spend more time together following their meeting in the film than they do in the novel.

=== Casting ===
Writer Christina Brennan characterized Sluizer's casting process for The Vanishing as "spontaneous." A casting agent suggested Sluizer see Johanna ter Steege, who was performing in a student play in Amsterdam, for the role of Saskia Wagter. When Sluizer saw that Steege's hair was a similar color to his daughter's, he decided she would be right for the character.

For the role of Rex, there was a choice between two actors: a Dutch actor and Belgian actor Gene Bervoets. Sluizer chose Bervoets because his French was stronger, but later felt unsure he had chosen the right actor, which led him to have a slightly uncomfortable relationship with Bervoets on set.

Jean-Louis Trintignant was Sluizer's initial choice for the role of Raymond Lemorne, but he was unavailable. After thinking about other French actors who could play the part, Sluizer thought of Bernard-Pierre Donnadieu, who had a small role in his film Twice a Woman (1979). Sluizer discovered Donnadieu had worked in television and had leading roles in films since appearing in Twice a Woman and got him signed to play Raymond after one meeting.

=== Filming ===
The Vanishing was filmed largely in Nîmes, France and the Netherlands on a budget of US$165,000. Bervoets commented in a retrospective interview that co-star Donnadieu acted like "a dictator on set", resulting in tensions between the central cast and director Sluizer. Ter Steege commented in a 2014 interview that she also clashed with Donnadieu, whom she felt demeaned her, stating that he worried about her capability as an actress: "I found out later on that he was very afraid that I was not good enough to be opposite of him... On the third or fourth day, the situation became unbearable." According to ter Steege, Donnadieu made repeated jokes about her and refused to speak to her in English, despite her only having a cursory knowledge of French. When ter Steege threatened to drop out of the production, Sluizer confronted Donnadieu, after which tensions calmed.

== Release ==
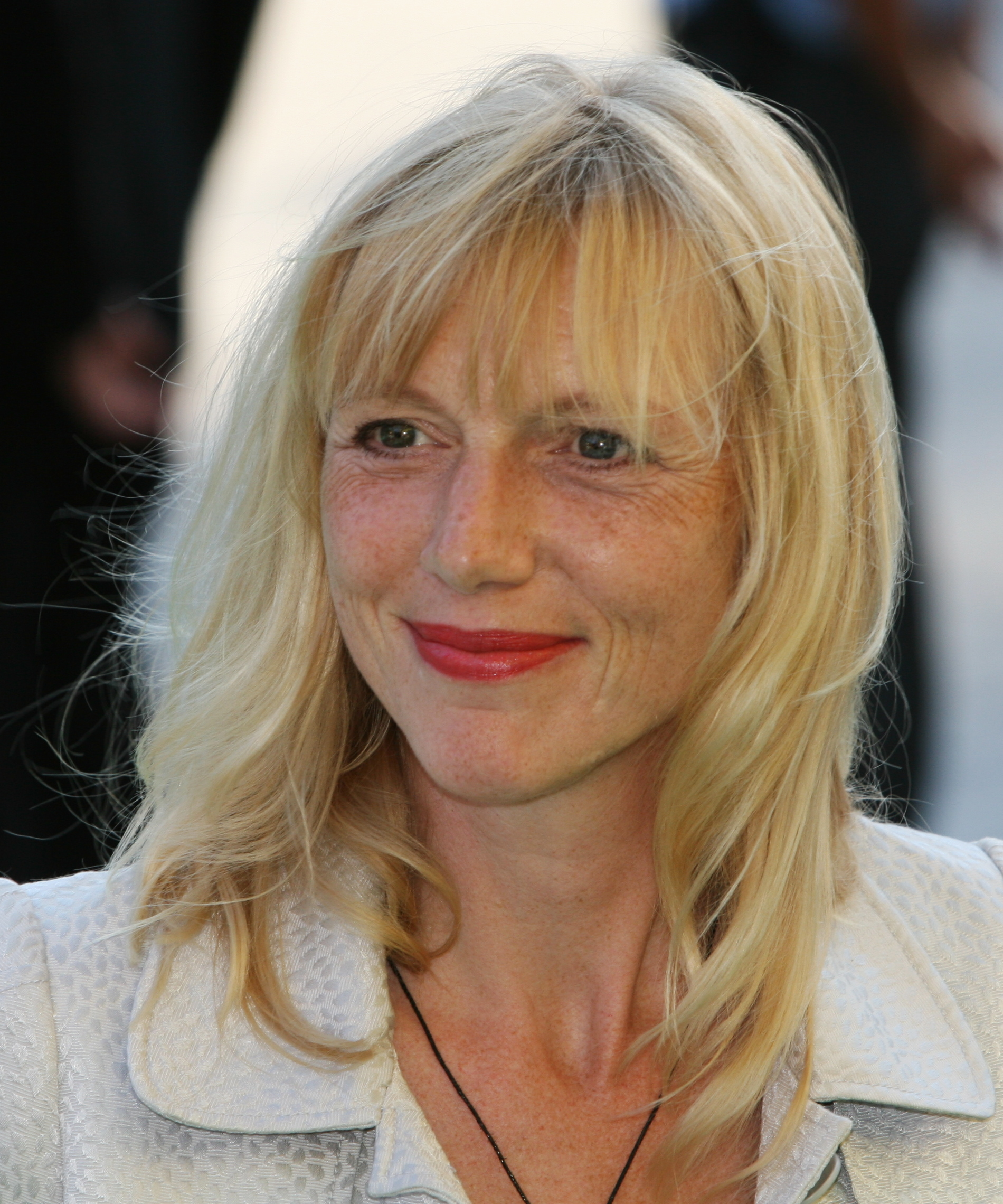
Johanna ter Steege (pictured in 2008) won a European Film Award for Best Supporting Actress for her performance

The Vanishing was released in the Netherlands on 27 October 1988. It was the Dutch submission for the Academy Award for Best Foreign Language Film in 1988, but was disqualified because the Academy of Motion Picture Arts and Sciences determined there was too much French dialogue for it to represent the Netherlands. The Dutch declined to send another film, leaving them unrepresented among the foreign submissions for the first time since 1972.

The film was released in France on 20 December 1989 under the title L'homme qui voulait savoir (lit. 'The Man Who Wanted to Know').

=== Home media ===
The first North American copies of The Vanishing were released on Laserdisc by Image Entertainment on 3 November 1997. It was later released on VHS by Fox Lorber on 11 November 1997, followed by a DVD release on 13 May 1998.

The Criterion Collection released a DVD of the film on 18 September 2001. This release contains the original French trailer and an essay on the film by film critic Kim Newman as supplemental material. Criterion re-released the film on Blu-ray and DVD on 28 October 2014, this time with the original French trailer, interviews with Sluizer and Johanna ter Steege, and an essay by Scott Foundas as supplements.

Under the supervision of EYE Film Institute Netherlands, the film was restored. This version was released on DVD as part of the George Sluizer "Collected Works" in 2019 and online in 2021.

== Reception ==
=== Critical response ===
On the review aggregator website Rotten Tomatoes, 96% of 51 critics' reviews are positive, with an average rating of 8.4/10. The website's consensus reads: "A clinical, maddening descent into the mind of a serial killer and a slowly unraveling hero, culminating with one of the scariest endings of all time."

The Vanishing received international praise at the time of its release. It was released in the United States in 1991 and made the National Board of Review's list of the Top Foreign Films of 1991. Desson Howe of The Washington Post praised the film's avoidance of cliches, noting that it is "refreshingly free of manipulative scenes involving running bath water, jagged-edge cutlery and bunnies in the saucepan". Howe also made note of the unusual move of revealing the kidnapper immediately and spending significant time learning about him.

Roger Ebert wrote in the Chicago Sun Times: "One of the most intriguing things about The Vanishing is the film's unusual structure, which builds suspense even while it seems to be telling us almost everything we want to know." Ted Mahar of The Oregonian described it as an "intellectual horror film... a richly and deeply scary tale, one that works on the mind as much as the emotions." Janet Maslin of The New York Times praised the film's performances and "controlled pacing," adding: "Sluizer is especially effective in bringing together the two halves of this story as Rex and Raymond cross paths three years after Saskia disappears. The influence of Claude Chabrol, for whose work Mr. Sluizer has expressed admiration, is especially noticeable in the film's later stages as quiet malice and fatal curiosity become intertwined."

Stanley Kubrick thought The Vanishing was the most terrifying film he had seen and called Sluizer to discuss editing. "Cadd" of Variety declared the film "the ultimate tribute to Alfred Hitchcock, daring to offer up an ending that goes beyond even the master's memorable climaxes". Dave Kehr, writing in the Chicago Tribune, said "It's a film that functions on curiosity rather than real interest ... yet in the end punishes the audience for wanting to have its questions answered." In 2010, Empire named The Vanishing the 67th-best "world cinema" film.

=== Accolades ===
Award/association	Year	Category	Recipient(s) and nominee(s)	Result	Ref.
Dallas-Fort Worth Film Critics Association	1992	Best Foreign Language Film	The Vanishing	Nominated	
European Film Awards	1988	Best Supporting Actress	Johanna ter Steege	Won	
National Board of Review	1991	Top Foreign Film	The Vanishing	Won	
National Society of Film Critics	1991	Best Foreign Language Film	The Vanishing	Nominated	
Netherlands Film Festival	1988	Best Film	George Sluzier; Anne Lordon	Won	
Netherlands Film Festival	1988	Dutch Film Critics Award	George Sluizer	Won	
New York Film Critics Circle	1991	Best Foreign Language Film	The Vanishing	Nominated	
Warsaw Film Festival	1991	Audience Award – Feature Film	George Sluizer	Nominated	

== Related works ==
=== Remake ===
Sluizer directed an English-language remake of the film for 20th Century Fox starring Jeff Bridges, Kiefer Sutherland, and Sandra Bullock, released in 1993. The remake was filmed and set in Washington in the Pacific Northwest of the United States.

=== Radio play ===
In 2010, the film was adapted for radio by Oliver Emanuel and broadcast on BBC Radio 4 as part of the station's Saturday Drama slot. Directed by Kirsty Williams, it starred Samuel West, Melody Grove and Ruth Gemmell. It has since been repeated on BBC Radio 4 Extra.

== See also ==
- Dutch films of the 1980s
- List of cult films
- List of thriller films of the 1980s
- The Vanishing (1993 film)
- List of submissions to the 61st Academy Awards for Best Foreign Language Film
- List of Dutch submissions for the Academy Award for Best Foreign Language Film

== Sources ==
- Cadd. (1991). Variety's Film Reviews 1987-1988. Vol. 20. R. R. Bowker. There are no page numbers in this book. This entry is found under the header "October 9, 1988". ISBN 0-8352-2667-0.
- Brennan, Christina (2025). The Vanishing (Spoorloos). Devil's Advocates. Liverpool, England: Liverpool University Press. ISBN 978-1-836-24375-5.
- Derry, Charles (2009). Dark Dreams 2.0: A Psychological History of the Modern Horror Film from the 1950s to the 21st Century. Jefferson, North Carolina: McFarland & Company. ISBN 978-0-786-45695-6.
- Grant, John (2006). Noir Movies Facts, Figures & Fun. London, England: Sterling Publishing Company. ISBN 978-1-904-33239-8.
- Mathijs, Ernest (2004). The Cinema of the Low Countries. London, England: Wallflower Press. ISBN 978-1-904-76400-7.
- Sluizer, George (2014). George Sluizer on The Vanishing (Blu-Ray). The Criterion Collection. ISBN 978-1-60465-920-7. CC2405BD.
