= Crimetime =

- Directed by: George Sluizer
- Written by: Brendan Somers
- Produced by: George Sluizer; David Pupkewitz; Phil Alberstat; Barry Barnholtz; Marc Vlessing
- Starring: Stephen Baldwin; Pete Postlethwaite; Sadie Frost; Geraldine Chaplin; Karen Black; Rory Campbell-Wheeler
- Cinematography: Jules van den Steenhoven
- Edited by: Fabienne Fawley
- Music by: David A. Stewart
- Distributed by: First Independent Films
- Release dates: August 1996 (U.S.); 29 November 1996 (UK)
- Running time: 118 minutes
- Country: United Kingdom
- Language: English
- Budget: £4.3 million ($6 million)

Crimetime is a 1996 British thriller film starring Stephen Baldwin, Pete Postlethwaite, Sadie Frost and directed by George Sluizer.

== Plot ==
Set in the near future where the media is nearly omnipotent, Crimetime is a British television series that creates reenactments of recent crimes, sometimes as recent as the previous day. While the programme’s narration urges viewers to come forward with any information related to the cases, the show’s producers are only concerned about ratings, competing with other crime shows for access to the latest and most gruesome crime scenes.

Bobby Mahon, a passionate but volatile American actor struggling to find work, is cast as the killer in a Crimetime episode, where his girlfriend Val is playing the victim. The murder they reenact involves a woman who was stabbed to death and had one of her stockings removed and her left eye cut out. Bobby is privy to the detail about the eye, but it is not mentioned in the episode itself to avoid inspiring copycat killers. Bobby feels that reality tv is beneath him, but still commits to the role, doing his best to understand the killer’s psychology. The murderer, Sidney, remains at large and sees his murder on tv the next day. Dissatisfied with the reenactment, he calls the show’s phone number and leaves a message specifically for Bobby, asking, “Why wasn’t she crying?”.

Bobby’s episode is very well received. When Sidney strikes again, Bobby insists on visiting the crime scene and seeing victim’s body himself. Bobby’s increasing dedication to his role concerns Val. Sidney, who dreams of being a television star himself, begins to live vicariously through Bobby and continues communicating with him through cryptic phone calls. Bobby becomes a breakout star thanks to his portrayal of the mystery killer, and both he and Sidney begin feeding off the actions of the other.

After Sidney injures himself during a murder, his killing spree stops, leaving Bobby out of work and emotionally distressed. Sidney encourages Bobby to take up the role of the real killer for the sake of both of them, but Bobby insists he will never be like Sidney.

Following this phone call with Sidney, Bobby meets a woman at a club and accompanies her to a bus stop, where he then forces her into a dark alcove in an alley. The next day, the woman’s body is discovered, butchered in Sidney’s characteristic manner, and Bobby is called upon to play the mystery killer again. Bobby narrowly avoids suspicion due to his bruised knuckles and meeting a witness on set. After getting his prop and real knife mixed up, he ends up stabbing Val, who is once again playing his victim. Bobby awakes at home in a panic, initially believing the previous night was a bad dream, but then realizes his knuckles are still bruised. He gets a call from Sidney suggesting that they should meet.

Bobby visits Sidney’s house alone, where he insists he did not murder the woman near the bus stop and ended up letting her go. Sidney reveals that he followed Bobby and witnessed the encounter, whereupon Bobby accuses Sidney of killing and butchering the woman. The argument culminates in Sidney insisting that both of them have become one another and impaling himself on the knife Bobby is holding.

The film then cuts to a movie set recreating the scene of Sidney’s death, where Bobby is climbing the stairs, making his way towards Sidney’s wife. Bobby turns to director Sluizer, insisting he did not go upstairs after killing Sidney, but Sluizer hushes him and insists this is the way the murder happens in the movie.

== Reception ==
Crimetime was released to negative critical reaction mainly noting the confusion of the plot. Shlomo Schwartzberg of Boxoffice magazine stated "Crime Time makes little sense at its best of times. At its worst, it's unwatchable." Channel 4 in their review noted that in spite of "a decent cast and the odd stylistic flourish, this psychodrama is dragged down by histrionic plotting, clunky talk and general sense of confusion over what it wants to be."
