= Dying to Go Home =

1996 Dutch-Portuguese film

- Dutch theatrical release poster
- Directed by: Carlos da Silva; George Sluizer
- Written by: Carlos da Silva; Jennifer Field
- Produced by: Carlos da Silva; George Sluizer
- Starring: Diogo Infante; Maria D'Aires; Jack Wouterse; Huub Stapel
- Cinematography: Theo Bierkens
- Edited by: Mario Steenbergen
- Music by: Henny Vrienten
- Production companies: Taiga Films; Katholieke Radio Omroep
- Distributed by: Warner Bros.
- Release date: 18 October 1996
- Running time: 104 minutes
- Countries: Netherlands; Portugal
- Languages: Dutch; Portuguese; English

Dying to Go Home (Portuguese: Mortinho por Chegar a Casa) is a Dutch-Portuguese film released in 1996. It was directed by Carlos da Silva and George Sluizer, starring Diogo Infante (as Manuel Espírito Santo) and Maria d'Aires (as Júlia Espírito Santo). The story takes place in Portugal and the Netherlands. Three languages are used during the movie (Portuguese, Dutch and English).

== Plot ==
Manuel Espírito Santo (whose surname means Holy Spirit), a Portuguese immigrant in the Netherlands suffers an accident and dies. Now a ghost, he discovers that his soul cannot rest unless his body is buried in his home country. He also discovers that he can appear in living people's dreams and thereby talk with them. He appears in his sister's dream and asks her to go to Amsterdam in order to retrieve his body.

== Trivia ==
Portuguese comedian Herman José has a minor role as Vasco da Gama.
