= Bernard-Pierre Donnadieu =

French actor (1949–2010)

- Born: 2 July 1949; Paris, France
- Died: 27 December 2010 (aged 61); Versailles, France
- Occupation: Actor
- Years active: 1974–2010
- Children: Ingrid Donnadieu

Bernard-Pierre Donnadieu (2 July 1949 – 27 December 2010) was a French actor. He made more than 100 appearances in movies and television over his career, as well as in theatrical roles. He was often cast as a villain, criminal or psychopath. Donnadieu was the French voice of many lead roles in English-language movies dubbed into French.

== Education ==
He studied theatre and literature at the Sorbonne Paris III.

== Career ==
Donnadieu's earliest notable film roles came in 1976 with The Tenant by Roman Polanski, and Second Chance (French: Si c'était à refaire, lit. 'If I Had to Do It All Over Again') by Claude Lelouch. The film which earned him wider recognition was Georges Lautner's 1981 action thriller, The Professional in which he had a major role, appearing with Jean-Paul Belmondo. Other notable film roles were the title part in The Return of Martin Guerre by Daniel Vigne, and in George Sluizer's The Vanishing, for which Donnadieu won best acting awards at the 1989 Madrid Film Festival and the 1990 Porto Film Festival. He was nominated for a best supporting actor César Award for his 1984 role as the dangerous criminal gang leader in Rue Barbare ('Barbarian Street'). His final film appearance was in 2008 in Christophe Barratier's Paris 36 (released in France as Faubourg 36).

Donnadieu appeared in many television and theatre productions. He played historical figures such as Hubert-Joseph Henry in the L'Affaire Dreyfus and Roger Salengro, in L'Affaire Salengro, a television film directed by Yves Boisset, with whom he regularly worked. While his appearance and physique seemed to influence directors to cast him as malevolent characters, he also had more sympathetic roles, such as the lead in the drama Faut pas rire du bonheur, in which his character has a romantic involvement with a woman, played by Laura Morante. His work dubbing French dialogue has included voicing characters portrayed by actors such as Kurt Russell, Dennis Hopper and Ron Perlman. In the theatre, he was a frequent collaborator with Georges Wilson who directed him in several productions.

== Death ==
Donnadieu died from cancer on 27 December 2010 at age 61.

== Filmography ==
- Docteur Françoise Gailland (1976)
- The Tenant (1976) – Bar waiter
- If I Had to Do It All Over Again (a.k.a. Second Chance; 1976) – Claude Blame
- Body of My Enemy (1976) – Blond hoodlum
- Mon premier amour (1978) – Café patron
- Judith Therpauve (1978) – Laindreaux
- Coup de tête (1979) – Lucien
- Un si joli village (1979) – Arnoux
- Twice a Woman (1979) – Second Frenchman
- 5% de risque (1980) – Angry driver
- Les Uns et les Autres (1981) – Red Cross representative Le représentant Croix Rouge (UNICEF)
- The Professional (1981) – Inspector Farges
- The Return of Martin Guerre (1982) – Martin Guerre
- L'indic (1983) – Malaggione
- Life Is a Bed of Roses (1983) – School teacher
- Liberty Belle (1983) – Yvon
- The Death of Mario Ricci (1983) – Jacky Vermot
- Rue barbare (1984) – Mathias Hagen, known as 'Matt', leader of the neighborhood gang
- Urgence (1985) – Lucas Schroeder
- Among Wolves (1985) – De Saintes
- Max mon amour (1986) – Archibald
- Flagrant désir (1986) – Robert Barnac
- L'intruse (1986) – Philippe Busard
- In the Shadow of the Wind (1987) – Pastor Nicolas Jones
- La Passion Béatrice (1987) – François, Béatrice's father
- The Vanishing (1988) – Raymond Lemorne
- Christian (1989)
- A Violent Life (1990) – François the First
- Connemara (1990) – Mark
- Marcellino (1991) – The count
- Blanc d'ébène (1991) – L'adjudant-recruteur Mariani
- Szwadron (1992) – Franek Bata
- Shadow of the Wolf (1992) – Brown
- Rosenemil (1993) – Dr. Friedmann
- Justinien Trouvé ou le Bâtard de Dieu (1993) – Martin Coutouly
- Mauvais garçon (1993) – Defendant
- Faut pas rire du bonheur (1994) – Michel
- Caboose (1996) – Larrivée
- Tower of the Firstborn (1998, TV Movie) – Abdurasam
- Druids (2001) – Dumnorix
- Antonio Vivaldi, un prince à Venise (2006) – The French ambassador
- Paris 36 (2008) – Félix Galapiat
- Rose et Noir (2009) – Poveda (voice)
