= Tim Krabbé =

Dutch journalist and novelist

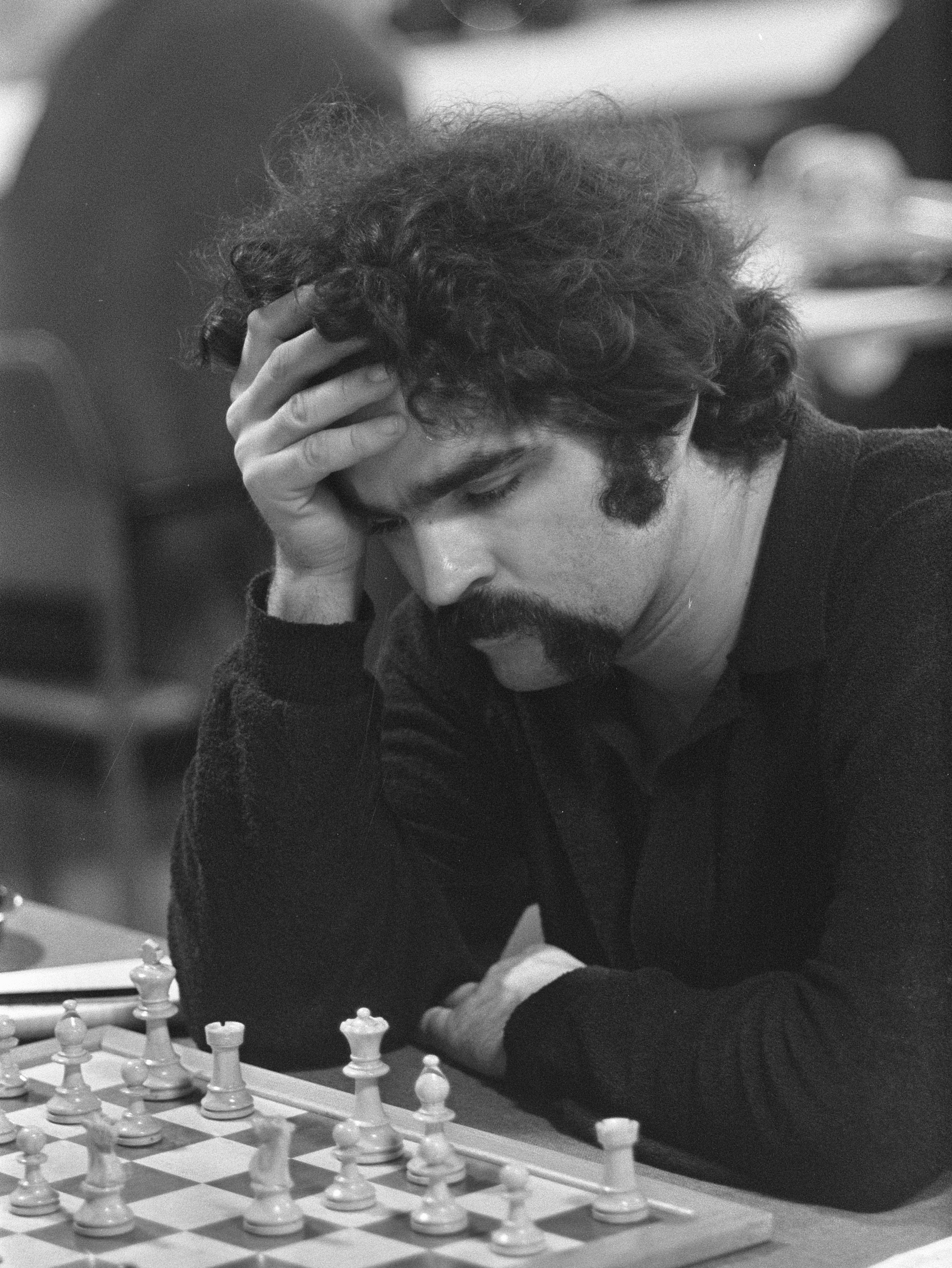
- Krabbé in 1969

Personal information
- Full name: Hans Maarten Timotheus Krabbé
- Born: 13 April 1943 (age 83) Amsterdam, Netherlands

Chess career
- Country: Netherlands
- Peak rating: 2290 (January 1990)
- Peak ranking: 3,800th (January 1990)

Hans Maarten Timotheus "Tim" Krabbé (born 13 April 1943) is a Dutch journalist, novelist and chess player.

Krabbé was born in Amsterdam. His writing has appeared in most major periodicals in the Netherlands. Once a competitive cyclist, he is known to Dutch readers for his novel De Renner (The Rider), first published in 1978 and translated into English in 2002, of which The Guardian's Matt Seaton wrote: "Nothing better is ever likely to be written on the subjective experience of cycle-racing". English readers know him primarily for The Vanishing (Dutch: Spoorloos, literally: "Traceless" or "Without a Trace"), the translation of his 1984 novel Het Gouden Ei (The Golden Egg), which was made into an acclaimed 1988 Dutch film for which Krabbé co-wrote a script. A poorly received American remake was made in 1993. In 1997 he published De grot, translated as The Cave and published in the U.S. in 2000. In 2009, he wrote the "Boekenweekgeschenk", called Een Tafel vol Vlinders.

Krabbé is a strong chess player who competed in two Dutch Chess Championships in 1967 and 1971. He maintains a chess website, and is renowned for his writings on the subject, in particular on chess problems; for instance, one of his publications is devoted to the Babson task. No longer an active player, his peak FIDE rating was 2290.

His father was the painter Maarten Krabbé (1908–2005) and his mother the Jewish film translator Margreet Reiss. He is the brother of actor Jeroen Krabbé and the multimedia artist/designer Mirko Krabbé, and the uncle of Martijn Krabbé, a Dutch media personality.

== Vertical castling ==
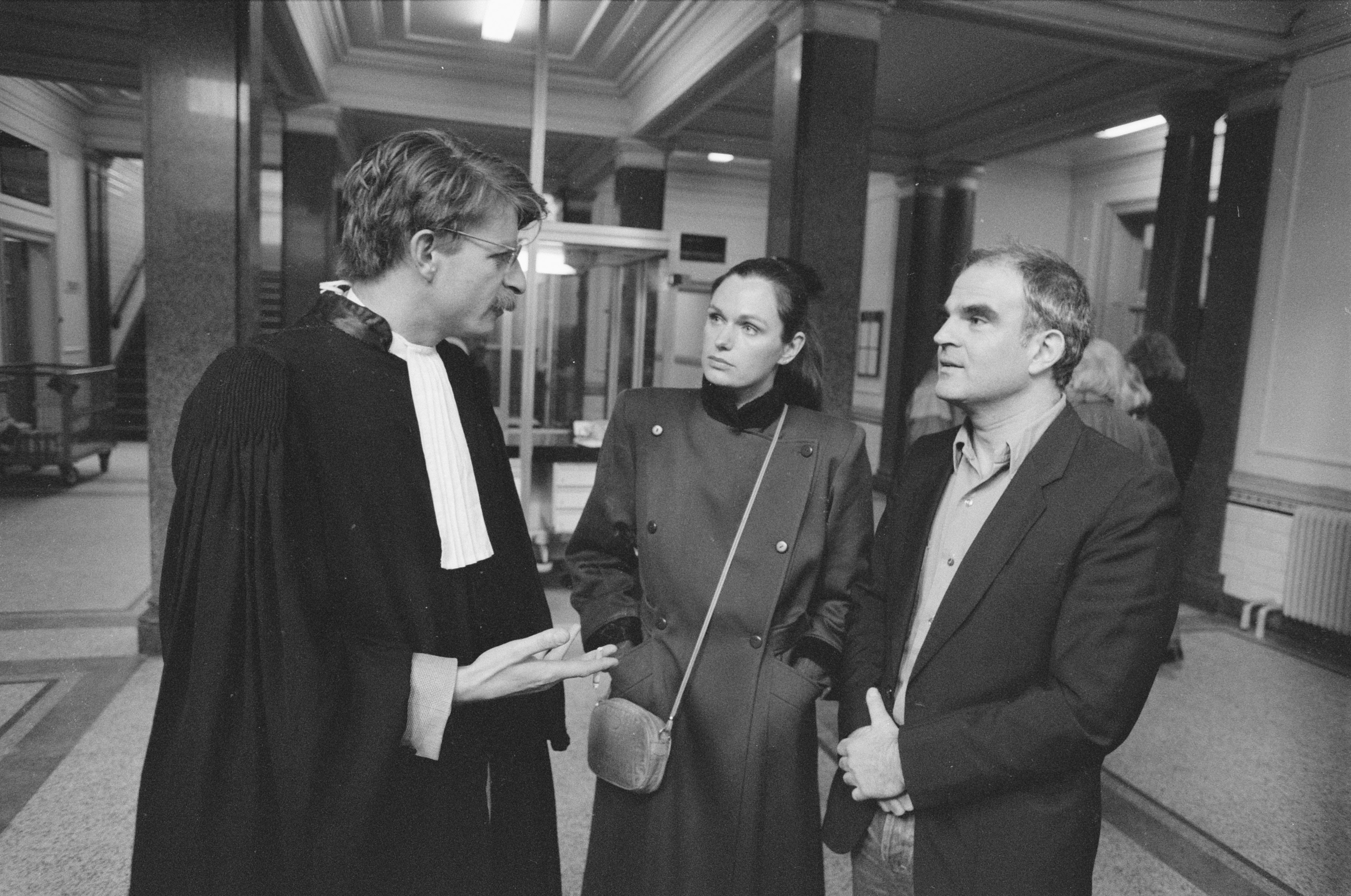
Krabbé in 1988 (right), with lawyer Germ Kemper and actress Liz Snoijink (Snoyink).

A popular story says that in 1972, Krabbé published a chess problem only solvable by a loophole in FIDE's rulebook. By promoting a pawn to a rook, that newly formed rook had not yet moved and so could be used for castling. This problem would have led FIDE to change castling rules and specify king and rook must be on the same rank. That story, however, is likely a hoax. Krabbé published a paper in 1976 referring to a 1971 problem by J. L. Seret based on that idea, and admitting that the rules already required king and rook to be on the same rank. This vertical castling idea was dubbed the Staugaard-Rochade and has examples dating back to 1907, but has been banned by FIDE rules since at least 1930.
