= Johanna ter Steege =

Dutch actress (born 1961)

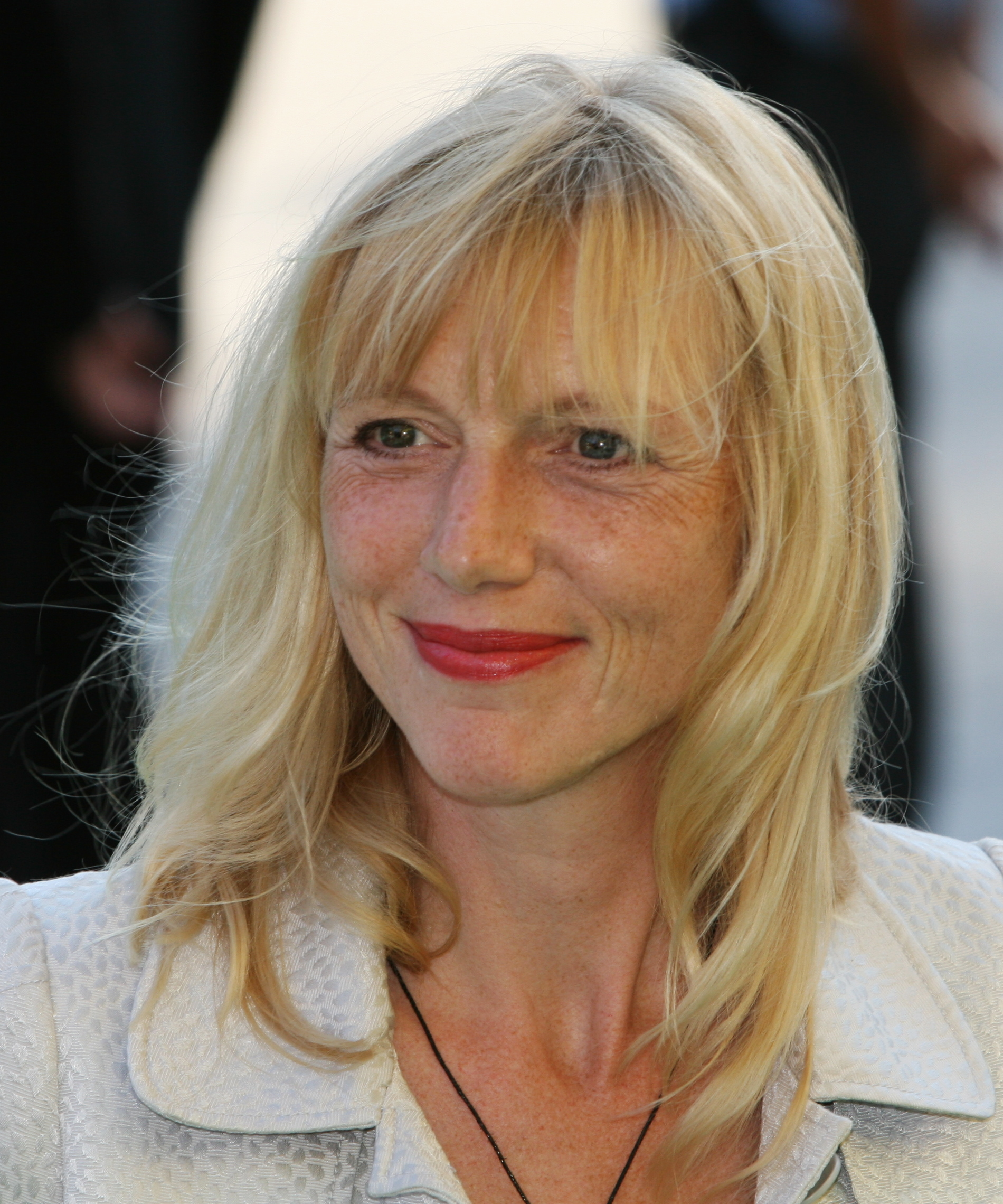
- ter Steege in 2008
- Born: 10 May 1961 (age 65); Wierden, Netherlands
- Occupation: Actress
- Years active: 1988–present

Johanna ter Steege (born 10 May 1961) is a Dutch actress.

== Career ==
She won the European Film Award for Best Supporting Actress for her movie debut in The Vanishing (1988). Among her other films are Robert Altman's Vincent & Theo (1990), István Szabó's Meeting Venus (1991) and Sweet Emma, Dear Böbe (1992), Bernard Rose's Immortal Beloved (1994), and Bruce Beresford's Paradise Road (1997).

In 1993, she was a member of the jury at the 43rd Berlin International Film Festival and was awarded with the Berlinale Camera.

In 1994, after Julia Roberts and Uma Thurman declined, Stanley Kubrick cast her for his adaptation of Louis Begley's novel Wartime Lies. Kubrick abandoned the project after it became clear that Steven Spielberg's Schindler's List would be released first.

== Filmography ==
Year	Title	Role	Notes
1988	The Vanishing	Saskia Wagter	European Film Award for Best Supporting Actress
1990	Vincent & Theo	Jo Bonger	directed by Robert Altman as 4-hour miniseries, released as 138-minute film.
1991	J'entends plus la guitare	Marianne	film won Silver Lion at 48th Venice International Film Festival
1991	Meeting Venus	Monique Angelo	UK/USA/Japan international coproduction filmed in Hungary
1992	Sweet Emma, Dear Böbe	Emma	film won Silver Bear - Special Jury Prize at 42nd Berlin International Film Festival
1993	The Birth of Love	Ulrika	France/Switzerland coproduction
1994	Immortal Beloved	Johanna Reiss	biographical film about Ludwig van Beethoven
1995	Goodbye	Laura	Original title: Tot ziens
1996	Le coeur fantôme	Mona	English title: The Phantom Heart
1997	Paradise Road	Sister Wilhelmina	filmed on location in Sydney, Singapore, Port Douglas and Penang.
1997	Für immer und immer	Susanna Eggers	English title: Forever and Ever
1999	Rembrandt	Saskia Uylenburgh	Germany/France/Netherlands international coproduction
1999	Een vrouw van het noorden	Emilie van Thuile	Dutch-language film made in Italy
2000	Mariken	Gravin	based on Peter van Gestel's children's book Mariken
2001	Passing Future - 3 Solo's	Vera	
2002	The Year of the First Kiss	Tristan's Mother	
2003	Sea of Silence	Ita Werner	
2004	Sergeant Pepper	Anna Singer	
2005	Guernsey	Bobby, Anna's sister	Belgium/Netherlands coproduction
2005	Someone Else's Happiness	Ann	Original title: Een ander zijn geluk
2007	L'été indien	Johanna	
2009	Last Conversation	Anna	
2009	L'insurgée	Madeleine	filmed in Brittany, France; English title: Restless
2010	Tirza	Alma	
2011	Istanbul	Katalin Munk	Hungary/Netherlands/Ireland/Turkey international coproduction, filmed in Budapest
2012	Achtste Groepers Huilen Niet	Moeder Akkie	English title: Cool Kids Don't Cry
2014	To Life	Lili	
2015	Het mooiste wat er is	Mother	
2016	History's Future	therapist	
2018	What Doesn't Kill Us	Sophie	Original title: Was uns nicht umbringt
2018	Hier	Klara	filmed in Morocco
2018	Maya	Johanna	France/Germany coproduction
2020	The Marriage Escape	Gedda	adaptation of 2016 Czech film Tiger Theory; original title: De Beentjes van Sint Hildegard; first cinema film predominantly spoken in Tweants dialect.

== Television ==
Year	Title	Role	Notes
1994	De pianiste	De Pianiste	TV movie
1996	Mama's Proefkonijn	Odille	TV movie
1997	The Broker's Man	Angelika Broeder	BBC series; 2 episodes
2000	De belager	Ellis Pauw	2-part TV movie
2001	The Sound of Drumming	Vera	TV movie
2006	Dalziel and Pascoe	DS Anna Breukink	BBC One series; 2 episodes: "Wrong Time, Wrong Place"
2008	De fuik	Moeder	TV movie
2009	Juliana, prinses van oranje	Greet Hofmans	2 episodes
2012	Lilet Never Happened	Claire	
2017	Brussel	Moniek van Dalen	7 episodes
2017	De mannen van dokter Anne	Ine Visser	5 episodes
