= Jeroen Krabbé =

Dutch actor, film director and painter

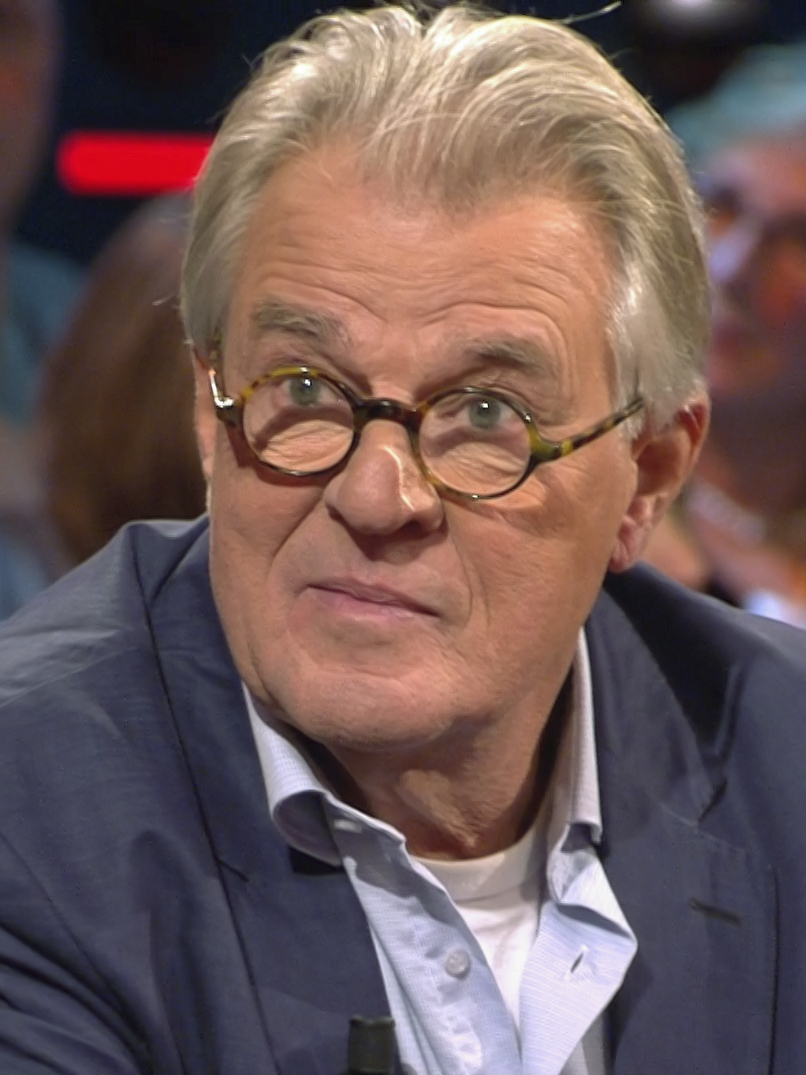
- Krabbé as a guest of the TV show De Wereld Draait Door, 2018
- Born: Jeroen Aart Krabbé; 5 December 1944 (age 81); Amsterdam, Netherlands
- Occupations: Actor; film director
- Years active: 1963–present
- Spouse: Herma Krabbé (after 1964)
- Children: 3, including Martijn Krabbé
- Father: Maarten Krabbé
- Relatives: Tim Krabbé (brother); Hendrik Maarten Krabbé (grandfather)

Jeroen Aart Krabbé (Dutch pronunciation: [jəˈrun ˈaːrt krɑˈbeeː]; born 5 December 1944) is a Dutch actor, film director and painter with a successful career in both Dutch- and English-language films. He is best known to international audiences for his leading roles in the Paul Verhoeven films Soldier of Orange (1977) and The Fourth Man (1983), for playing the villain General Georgi Koskov in the James Bond film The Living Daylights (1987) and his parts in The Prince of Tides (1991), The Fugitive (1993), and Immortal Beloved (1994). His 1998 directorial debut, Left Luggage, was nominated for the Golden Bear at the 49th Berlin International Film Festival.

== Early life ==
Krabbé was born into an artistic family in Amsterdam. Both his father, Maarten Krabbé, and grandfather Hendrik Maarten Krabbé were well-known painters, and his mother Margreet (née Reiss; 1914–2002), was a film translator. His brother, Tim, is a writer and high-level chess player, and his half-brother, Mirko, is an artist. Only later in life did he learn that his mother was Jewish and that her family had been killed during the Holocaust.

== Career ==
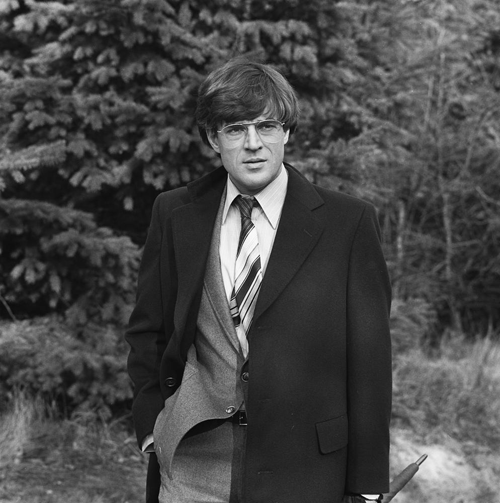
Jeroen Krabbé in 1980

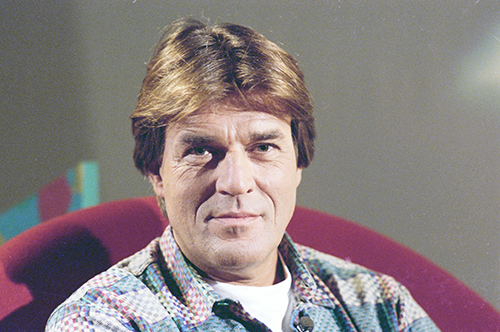
Krabbé in 1992

Internationally, he first came to prominence in fellow Dutchman Paul Verhoeven's films, Soldier of Orange opposite Rutger Hauer and The Fourth Man with Renée Soutendijk. His first big American film was the Whoopi Goldberg comedy, Jumpin' Jack Flash. However, it was his roles as villains in a string of international films from the late 1980s and early 1990s which brought him international stardom, with notable roles such as Losado in No Mercy (1986), General Georgi Koskov in the James Bond film The Living Daylights (1987), Gianni Franco in The Punisher (1989), Herbert Woodruff in The Prince of Tides (1991), and Dr. Charles Nichols in The Fugitive (1993). He appeared in numerous TV productions, and as Satan in the TV production Jesus.

He was both director and producer of a 1998 film about Orthodox Jews during the 1970s in Antwerp, Belgium, co-starring Isabella Rossellini and Maximilian Schell called Left Luggage, as well as the Harry Mulisch novel adapted into film The Discovery of Heaven. Left Luggage was entered into the 48th Berlin International Film Festival. The following year, he was a member of the jury at the 49th Berlin International Film Festival.

His television work included playing an uncanny psychic in the Midsomer Murders series 11 episode "Talking to the Dead". Krabbé had an exhibition of his paintings in Museum de Fundatie (Zwolle), in 2008. He began working on documentaries for Dutch television about his favorite painters. In 2015 the first series was about Van Gogh, followed in 2017 by a series about Picasso, in 2018 about Gauguin and in 2020, about Chagall and in August 2022, about Frida Kahlo. In November 2024 a series about Matisse was broadcast.

== Personal life ==
Krabbé married Herma van Gemert in 1964. Together they have three sons – Martijn (who is a radio and television presenter), Jasper and Jacob.

Apart from acting and directing, he is an accomplished artist (his paintings have appeared on Dutch postage stamps), and has co-authored a Dutch cookbook. In November 2004, he released the book Schilder, which is an overview of his paintings.

== Selected filmography ==
=== Actor ===
- Fietsen naar de Maan (1963) as decoration trainee
- Professor Columbus (1968) as Jan
- The Little Ark (1972) as first man
- Alicia (1974) as pilot
- Soldaat van Oranje (1977) as Guus LeJeune
- Martijn en de magiër (1979) as regisseur
- Een pak slaag (1979) as Dries Barns
- Spetters (1980) as Frans Henkhof
- Een Vlucht Regenwulpen (1981) as Maarten (alter ego)
- World War III (1982, TV Miniseries) as Colonel Alexander Vorashin
- Het verleden (1982) as Harry Heyblom
- The Fourth Man (1983) as Gerard Reve
- Het Dagboek van Anne Frank (1985, TV movie) as Otto Frank
- Turtle Diary (1985) as Mr. Sandor (the slob)
- In de schaduw van de overwinning (1986) as Peter van Dijk
- Jumpin' Jack Flash (1986) as Mark Van Meter
- No Mercy (1986) as Losado
- Code Name Dancer (1987) as Malarin
- Miami Vice (1987, "Heroes of the Revolution") as Klaus Herzog
- The Living Daylights (1987) as General Georgi Koskov
- A World Apart (1988) as Gus Roth
- Crossing Delancey (1988) as Anton Maes
- Shadow Man (1988) as Theo
- Jan Cox A Painter's Odyssey (1988) as Narrator (voice)
- Scandal (1989) as Eugene Ivanov
- Melancholia (1989) as David Keller
- The Punisher (1989) as Gianni Franco
- Till There Was You (1990) as Robert "Viv" Vivaldi
- Robin Hood (1991) as Baron Roger Daguerre
- Sahara Sandwich (1991)
- Kafka (1991) as Bizzlebek
- The Prince of Tides (1991) as Herbert Woodruff
- Dynasty: The Reunion (1991, TV Series) as Jeremy Van Dorn
- For a Lost Soldier (1992) as Jeroen Boman (old)
- Stalin (1992) as Nikolai Bukharin
- King of the Hill (1993) as Mr. Kurlander
- Oeroeg (1993) as Hendrik Ten Berghe
- The Fugitive (1993) as Dr. Charles Nichols
- Farinelli (1994) as George Frideric Handel
- Immortal Beloved (1994) as Anton Schindler
- The Disappearance of Garcia Lorca (1996) as Colonel Aguirre
- The Odyssey (1997) as King Alcinous of Phaeacia
- Left Luggage (1998) as Mr. Kalman
- Dangerous Beauty (1998) as Pietro Venier
- Ever After (1998) as Auguste de Barbarac
- An Ideal Husband (1999) as Baron Arnheim
- Jesus (1999) as Satan
- Il Cielo Cade (The Sky is Falling) (2000) as Wilhelm
- The Discovery of Heaven (2001) as Gabriel
- Fogbound (2002) as Dr. Duff
- Ocean's Twelve (2004) as Van der Woude
- Off Screen (2005) as Gerard Wesselinck
- Deuce Bigalow: European Gigolo (2005) as Gaspar Voorsboch
- Snuff-Movie (2005) as Boris Arkadin (Mr. Maezel)
- Life! (2005) as Hugo
- Dalziel and Pascoe (2006, "Wrong Time, Wrong Place") as Det Supt Wim de Kuiper
- Midsomer Murders (2008, "Talking to the Dead") as Cyrus LeVanu
- Transporter 3 (2008) as Leonid Tomilenko
- Yankee Go Home (2009) as Minister
- Albert Schweitzer (2009) as Albert Schweitzer
- Rico's Wings (2009)
- Alleen maar nette mensen (2011) as Bram Samuels
- Tula: The Revolt (2013) as Gouverneur De Veer
- Gangster Kittens (2016) as Pierre
- Amerikali Kiz (2018)
- De Liefhebbers (2019) as Jan
- The Host (2020) as Vera's father
- Bosrandgeluk (2020) (short)
- Het Kamp (2022) (short)
- Neem me mee (2023) as Joep

=== Director ===
- Het Dagboek van Anne Frank (TV movie 1985)
- Left Luggage (1998)
- The Discovery of Heaven (2001)

== Bibliography ==
- Alles bleef zoals het niet was / J. H. van Geemert gedichten; Jeroen Krabbé tekeningen – Amsterdam : De Beuk, 1992. 29 p. ISBN 90-6975-224-7. Opl. van 60 genummerde en gesigneerde ex. losbl. in cassette, ISBN 90-6975-223-9
- Bezuinigingskookboek : kookboek voor de jaren 80 / Marjan Berk and Jeroen Krabbé – Amsterdam : Tiebosch, 1980. 189 p. ISBN 90-6278-509-3. 2e dr. (1985) zonder ondertitel: [illustration Jan van Wessum] – Haarlem : Gottmer, 1985. 183 p. ISBN 90-257-1917-1
- Het eenvoudige kookboek / Marian "Marjan" Berk, Jeroen Krabbé; [illustration Pam Pollack et al.] – Amsterdam: Atlas, 1993. 207 p. ISBN 90-254-0446-4. Herz. versie van: Bezuinigingskookboek.
