= George Sluizer =

Dutch filmmaker

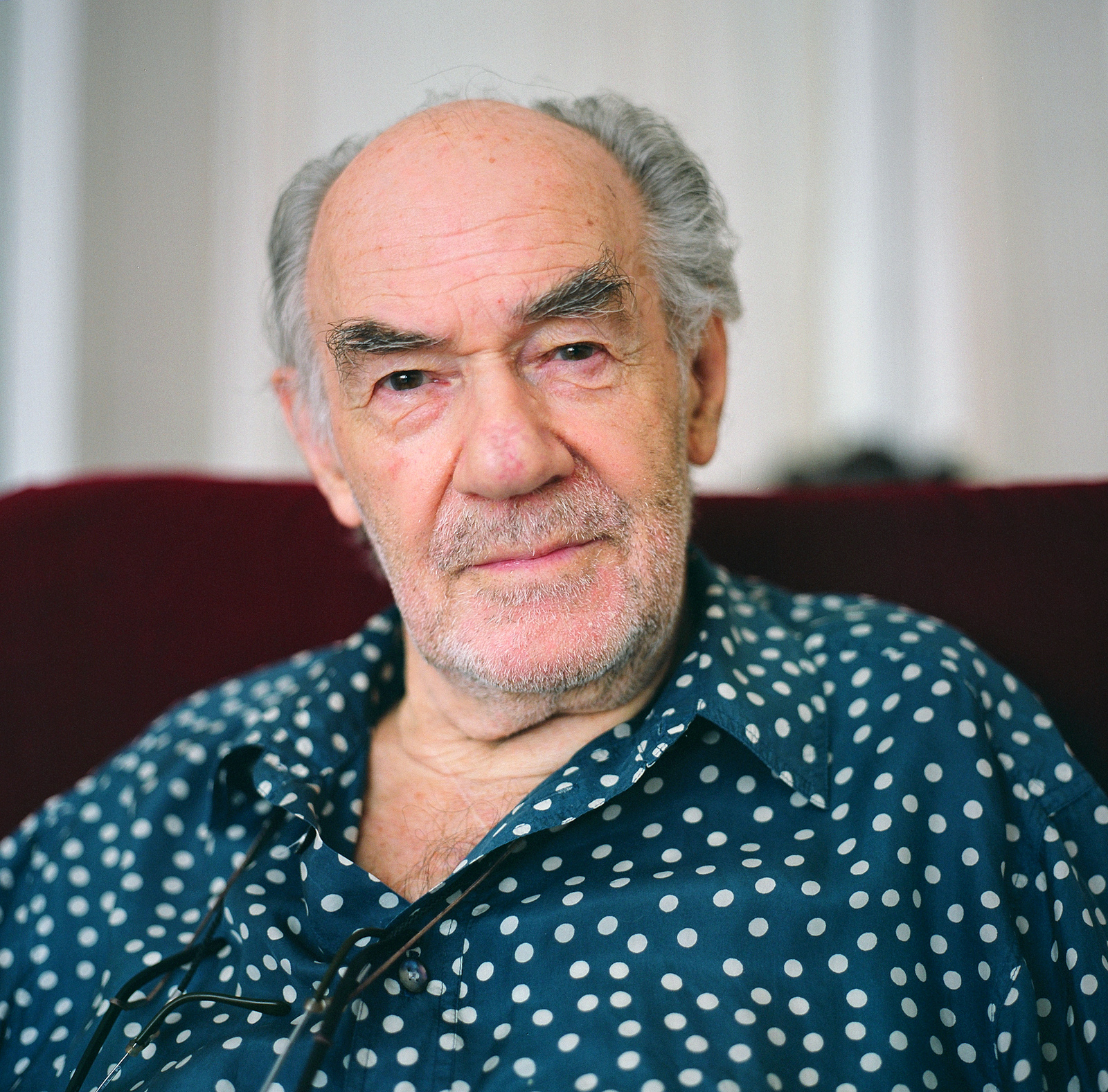
- Sluizer in 2012
- Born: 25 June 1932; Paris, France
- Died: 20 September 2014 (aged 82); Amsterdam, Netherlands
- Occupations: Film director; producer; screenwriter; film editor; author
- Years active: 1961–2014
- Notable work: The Vanishing; Utz; Dark Blood

George Sluizer (25 June 1932 – 20 September 2014) was a Dutch filmmaker whose credits included features as well as documentary films.

== Career ==
Sluizer was born on 25 June 1932 in Paris, France. He was best known for directing two versions of The Vanishing, a 1988 Dutch-language release, originally titled Spoorloos, and the 1993 American version. Other feature films directed by Sluizer included Utz (1992) for producer John Goldschmidt, Crimetime (1995), and Dark Blood, which was discontinued after the death of its lead actor River Phoenix, but later completed and premiered at the Netherlands Film Festival in 2012.

From 2012 until 2014 he was part of the film jury for ShortCutz Amsterdam.

Director Dennis Alink made a documentary called Sluizer Speaks during the final years of Sluizer's life. It premiered two months after his death at the IDFA in Amsterdam.

== Accusations against Ariel Sharon ==
Sluizer claimed that he had witnessed then-Israeli Defense Minister, Ariel Sharon, personally shooting two Palestinian children from close range near the Sabra-Shatilla refugee camp in November 1982, after the Sabra and Shatila massacre. Sluizer was accused by Israeli officials of a 'modern blood libel' for his claims – which in 2010 achieved front page level publicity in Israel.

== Death ==
Sluizer suffered from arterial disease in his later life, and in 2007 experienced a near-fatal aortic dissection. Sluizer died in Amsterdam on 20 September 2014, aged 82, after suffering a "long illness."

== Filmography ==
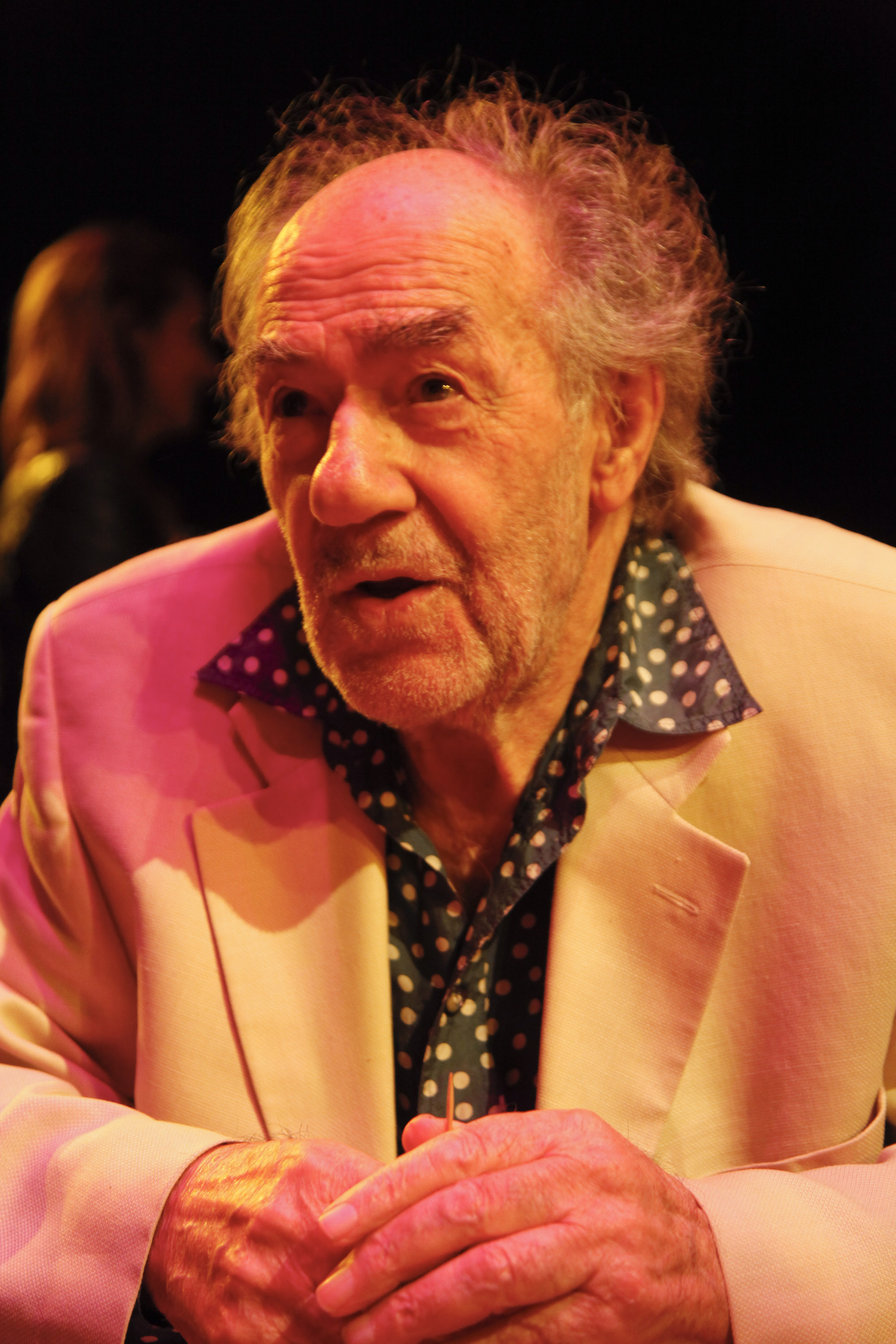
Sluizer at the Miami International Film Festival premiere of Dark Blood in 2013

=== As director ===
Year	Title	English title	Notes
1961	De lage landen	Hold Back the Sea	
1967	Yankee Sails Across Europe		National Geographic Special
1968	The Lonely Dorymen		National Geographic Special. Documentary about Portuguese fishermen
1969	Siberia: The Lost Horizon		National Geographic Special
1971	Stamping Ground		Directed with Hansjürgen Pohland
1972	João en het mes	João and the Knife	Entered into the 22nd Berlin International Film Festival
1979	Twee vrouwen	Twice a Woman	
1982	Tepito Si		Short film
1983	Adios Beirut		
1985	Red Desert Penitentiary	Red Desert Penitentiary	
1988	Spoorloos	The Vanishing	
1992	Utz	Utz	Entered into the 42nd Berlin International Film Festival
1993	The Vanishing		Remake of Spoorloos
1996	Crimetime	Crimetime	
1996	Mortinho por Chegar a Casa	Dying to Go Home	Directed with Carlos da Silva
1998	The Commissioner	The Commissioner	Entered into the 48th Berlin International Film Festival
2002	La balsa de piedra	The Stone Raft	
2009	The Chosen One	The Chosen One	
2010	Homeland	Homeland	
2012	Dark Blood	Dark Blood	Originally filmed in 1993 and technically unfinished. Entered into the 32nd Netherlands Film Festival

== Awards and nominations ==
- 1988 - Golden Calf Best Film, Nederlands Film Festival, for Spoorloos
- 1997 - Nomination Crystal Star, Brussels International Film Festival, for Mortinho por Chegar a Casa
- 1998 - Nomination Golden Bear, Berlinale, for The Commissioner
- 2002 - Nomination Golden Calf Best Film & Beste Director, Nederlands Film Festival, for La balsa de piedra
- 2002 - Juryprize, Nederlands Film Festival, for La balsa de piedra
- 2013 - ShortCutz Amsterdam Career Award
