= List of Dutch films of the 1980s =

This is a list of films produced in the Netherlands during the 1980s. The films are produced in the Dutch language.

Title	Year	Director	Cast	Genre	Notes
1980
Spetters	1980	Paul Verhoeven	Renée Soutendijk		
Dirty Picture		Pim de la Parra	Pim de la Parra	Docufilm	
Het Teken van het Beest		Pieter Verhoeff	Gerard Thoolen, Marja Kok	Drama	
De Bende van Hiernaast					
Laat de Dokter maar Schuiven		Nikolai van der Heyde	Jo de Meyere; Piet Bambergen	Komedie	
Lieve Jongens		Paul de Lussanet	Hugo Metsers, Hans Dagelet	Drama	
Bekende Gezichten, Gemengde Gevoelens		Ate de Jong	Hans Dagelet, Carol van Herwijnen	Drama	
Het Verdronken Land				Docufilm	

Title	Year	Director	Cast	Genre	Notes
1981
Een vlucht regenwulpen	1981	Ate de Jong	Jeroen Krabbe	Drama	
Het Verboden Bacchanaal		Wim Verstappen	Rijk Gooyer, Geert de Jong		
ik ben Joep Meloen		Guus Verstraete jr	André van Duyn, Corry van Gorp	Komedie	
Het meisje met het rode haar		Ben Verbong	Renée Soutendijk, Peter Tuinman	Drama; Oorlog	Entered into the 32nd Berlin International Film Festival
Hoge Hakken, Echte Liefde		Dimitri Frenkel Frank	Monique van de Ven, Rijk de Gooyer	Drama; Komedie	
Charlotte		Frans Weisz	Birgit Doll, Derek Jacobi	Drama	
Twee vorstinnen en een vorst		Otto Jongerius	Kitty Courbois, Linda van Dyck	Drama	
Te Gek om Los te Lopen		Guido Pieters	Peter Faber, Jaap Stobbe		
De Pretenders		Jos Stelling	Evert Holtzers	Drama	Entered into the 12th Moscow International Film Festival
GekkenBriefje					
1982
Allemaal tuig!	1982	Ben Sombogaart			
Breathless		Mady Saks			Entered into the 13th Moscow International Film Festival
De Boezemvriend		Dimitri Frenkel Frank	André van Duin, Jerome Reehuis	Komedie	
Van de koele meren des doods		Nouchka van Brakel	Renée Soutendijk, Derek de Lint	Drama	
Luger		Theo van Gogh	Thom Hoffman	Thriller	
De Stilte Rond Christine M		Marleen Gorris	Edda Barendse, Henriette Tol	Drama	
Een Zwoele Zomeravond		Shireen Strooker, Frans Weisz	Marja Kok, Gerard Thoolen	Komedie	
Het Verleden		Bas van der Lecq, Bram van Erkel	Jeroen Krabbe, Elja Pelgrom	Drama	
De smaak van water		Orlow Seunke	Gerard Thoolen, Dorijn curvers	Drama	Entered into the 39th Venice International Film Festival
Het Dak van de Walvis		Raúl Ruiz			
Pruimenbloesem		Willem van Batenburg	Diane de Koning	Erotiek	
Menuet		Lily Rademakers-Veenman	Kris van Dale, Akkemay Marijnissen (Elderenbos)		
Sprong naar de Liefde		Bas van der Lecq	Manouk van der Meulen, Kees Prins	Romantiek	
1983
Als je begrijpt wat ik bedoel				Animatie	
De Anna					
An Bloem					
Brandende liefde					
The Fourth Man		Paul Verhoeven	Jeroen Krabbé, Renée Soutendijk	Thriller	
The Illusionist					
De Lift		Dick Maas	Huub Stapel	Horror; Thriller	
De Mannetjesmaker					
Pim					
'n Schot in de Roos	1983	Willem van Batenburg	Frank Blaaders, Diana De Koning, Mark de Poorter, Wilma de Winter	Erotiek	
Vroeger kon je Lachen					
De Zwarte Ruiter					
Een Zaak van Leven of Dood					
1984
Ciske de Rat		Guido Pieters	Danny de Munk, Willeke van Ammelrooy, Peter Faber, Linda van Dyck		
Schatjes!		Ruud van Hemert	Peter Faber, Geert de Jong, Akkemay Marijnissen (Elderenbos), Frank Schaafsma		
Een dagje naar het strand		Theo van Gogh			
Moord in Extase		Hans Scheepmaker	Joop Doderer; Ron Brandsteder	Misdaad	
De Witte Waan					
De stille Oceaan	Digna Sinke				Entered into the 34th Berlin International Film Festival
Bastille					
De grens		Leon de Winter			Screened at the 1984 Cannes Film Festival
De weg naar Bresson		Leo De Boer, Jurriën Rood		Documentary	Screened at the 1984 Cannes Film Festival
Gebroken Spiegels					
De Schorpioen					
Het Licht van Cadiz					
Overvallers in de Dierentuin				Jeugd	
1985
Het Bittere Kruid	1985			Oorlog	
Wildschut		Bobby Eerhart	Hidde Maas	Thriller; Misdaad	Belgische co-productie
Mama is Boos		Ruud van Hemert			
Pervola, sporen in de sneeuw		Orlow Seunke		Drama	Entered into the 42nd Venice International Film Festival
De Prooi			Rijk de Gooyer	Thriller	
De IJssalon		Dimitri Frenkel Frank	Renée Soutendijk	Drama; Oorlog	Entered into the 14th Moscow International Film Festival
Soldaten zonder Geweren					
De Deur van het Huis					
1986
Op hoop van zegen	1986	Guido Pieters	Kitty Courbois, Danny de Munk	Vissersdrama	
De Wisselwachter		Jos Stelling			
In de schaduw van de overwinning					
Flodder		Dick Maas	Huub Stapel, Nelly Frijda	Komedie	
De Aanslag		Fons Rademakers	Derek de Lint	Oorlog	Won een Oscar
Abel		Alex van Warmerdam			
Charley					
Het Gezin van Paemel					
Als in een Roes					
Field of Honor		Dae-hie Kim, Hans Scheepmaker	Everett McGill, Ron Brandsteder; Bart Römer	Oorlog	
1987
Terug naar Oegstgeest	1987	Theo van Gogh	Tom Jansen, Hidde Kuiper	Drama; Komedie	
Een Maand Later		Noucka van Brakel	Renée Soutendijk, Monique van de Ven	Komedie; Drama	
Iris		Mady Saks	Monique van de Ven, John Kraaykamp	Drama; Thriller	
Havinck		Frans Weisz	Willem Nijholt	Drama	Screened at the 1988 Cannes Film Festival
Blonde Dolly		Gerrit van Elst	Hilde van Mieghem, Peter Tuinman	Drama	
Van geluk gesproken		Pieter Verhoeff	Mirjam Sternheim, Gerard Thoolen		
Grijpstra en de Gier 2: De Ratelrat		Wim Verstappen	Rijk de Gooyer, Peter Faber	Misdaad	
Zoeken naar Eileen W.		Rudolf van den Berg	Thom Hoffman, Lysette Anthony	Drama	
Dagboek van een Oude Dwaas		Lily Rademakers	Ralph Micheal, Beatie Edney	Drama	
Vroeger is Dood		Ine Schenkan	Jasperine de Jong, Max Croiset	Drama	
1988
Honneponnetje	1988	Ruud van Hemert	Nada van Nie	Komedie	
Donna Donna		Hans & Luc van Beek	René van 't Hof, Simone Walraven	Komedie; Drama	
Amsterdamned		Dick Maas	Huub Stapel, Monique van de Ven	Thriller	
De Avonden		Rudolf van den Berg	Thom Hoffman, Rijk de Gooyer	Drama	
Rituelen		Herbert Curiel	Derek de Lint, Thom Hoffman	Drama	
Hersenschimmen		Heddy Hodigmann	Joop Admiraal, Marja Kok	Drama	
Theo en Thea en de ontmaskering van het tenenkaasimperium			Tosca Niterink, Arjan Ederveen	Komedie	
The Vanishing	1988	George Sluizer	Bernard-Pierre Donnadieu, Gene Bervoets, Johanna ter Steege	Thriller	Dutch-French co-production
1989
Jan Rap en zijn maat	1989	Ine Schenkan	Paul de Leeuw, Jasperina de Jong	Drama	
Loos		Theo van Gogh	Tom Jansen, Renée Fokker	Drama	
Mijn Vader woont in Rio					
De Kassière		Ben Verbong	Marion van Thijn, Thom Hoffman		
Lost in Amsterdam		Pim de la Parra	Kenneth Hardegein, Manouk van der Meulen	Drama	
Wilde Harten		Jindra Markus	Alexandra van Marken, Han Oldigs		
Leedvermaak		Frans Weisz	Catherine ten ruggecate, Pierre Bokma	Drama	aka Polonaise
Ongedaan Gedaan					
Zwerfsters					
