= 42nd Venice International Film Festival =

1985 film festival in Italy

- Festival poster
- Location: Venice, Italy
- Founded: 1932
- Awards: Golden Lion: Vagabond
- Festival date: 26 August – 6 September 1985
- Website: Website

Venice Film Festival chronology
- 43rd 41st

The 42nd annual Venice International Film Festival was held on 26 August to 6 September 1985.

Polish filmmaker Krzysztof Zanussi was the Jury President of the main competition. The Golden Lion winner was Vagabond directed by Agnès Varda.

== Jury ==
The following people comprised the 1985 jury:

- Krzysztof Zanussi, Polish filmmaker and producer - Jury President
- Guido Aristarco, Italian film critic and author
- Gaspare Barbiellini Amidei, Italian sociologist
- Ricardo Bofill, Spanish architect
- Frank Capra, Italian-American filmmaker
- Jean d'Ormesson, French novelist
- Odysseas Elytis, Greek poet and art critic
- Kon Ichikawa, Japanese filmmaker
- Eugène Ionesco, Romanian-French playwright
- Elem Klimov, Soviet filmmaker
- Lino Miccichè, Italian film critic
- Zoran Mušič, Yugoslav painter
- John Schlesinger, British director
- Renzo Vespignani, Italian painter

== Official Sections ==
The following films were selected to be screened:

=== In Competition ===
English title	Original title	Director(s)	Production country
Dust		Marion Hänsel	Belgium, France
The Empty Table	食卓のない家	Masaki Kobayashi	Japan
The Feather Fairy	Perinbaba	Juraj Jakubisko	Czechoslovakia, West Germany
Forget Mozart	Vergeßt Mozart	Miloslav Luther	West Germany, Czechoslovakia
Glissando		Mircea Daneliuc	Romania
The Guardian	Bekçi	Ali Özgentürk	Turkey, West Germany
Legend		Ridley Scott	United States
Life Is Beautiful	Zivot je lep	Boro Draskovic	Yugoslavia
The Lightship		Jerzy Skolimowski	United States
Mother Ebe	Mamma Ebe	Carlo Lizzani	Italy
No Man's Land		Alain Tanner	Switzerland, France, West Germany, United Kingdom
Planet Parade	Парад планет	Vadim Abdrashitov	Soviet Union
The Lost Paradise	Los paraísos perdidos	Basilio Martín Patino	Spain
Police		Maurice Pialat	France
Prizzi's Honor		John Huston	United States
Requiem for a Spanish Peasant	Réquiem por un campesino español	Francesc Betriu	Spain
The Satin Slipper	O Sapato de Cetim	Manoel de Oliveira	Portugal, France
Stone Years	Petrina hronia	Pantelis Voulgaris	Greece
The Tango of Our Childhood	Մեր մանկության տանգոն / Танго нашего детства	Albert Mkrtchyan	Soviet Union
Tangos, the Exile of Gardel	Tangos, el exilio de Gardel	Fernando Solanas	Argentina, France
Tracks in the Snow	Pervola, sporen in de sneeuw	Orlow Seunke	Netherlands, Norway
Vagabond	Sans toit ni loi	Agnès Varda	France
Woman of Wonders	La donna delle meraviglie	Alberto Bevilacqua	Italy

=== Out of Competition ===
English title	Original title	Director(s)	Production country
Orfeo		Claude Goretta	Italy, Switzerland, Canada, France
Orpheus and Eurydice	Orfeusz és Euridike	István Gaál	Hungary
A Passage to India		David Lean	United Kingdom

=== Venezia Giovani ===
English title	Original title	Director(s)	Production country
Back to the Future		Robert Zemeckis	United States
Cocoon		Ron Howard	United States
Echo Park		Robert Dornhelm	United States
Flesh and Blood		Paul Verhoeven	United States, Netherlands, Spain
Fletch		Michael Ritchie	United States
Karnabal		Carles Mira	Spain
Letter to Brezhnev		Chris Bernard	United Kingdom
Mad Max Beyond Thunderdome		George Miller	Australia
Running Out of Luck		Julien Temple	United States
Silverado		Lawrence Kasdan	United States
Tex and the Lord of the Deep	Tex e il signore degli abissi	Duccio Tessari	Italy

=== Special Events ===
English title	Original title	Director(s)	Production country
Adultery Tree	자녀목	Jung Jin-woo	South Korea
Beethoven's Nephew	Le neveu de Beethoven	Paul Morrissey	France
Come and See	Иди и смотри	Elem Klimov	Soviet Union
Death of a Salesman		Volker Schlöndorff	United States
Frida Still Life	Frida, naturaleza viva	Paul Leduc	Mexico
George Stevens: A Filmmaker's Journey		George Stevens Jr.	United States
Mi hijo el Che - Un retrato de familia de don Ernesto Guevara		Fernando Birri	Cuba
Power of Evil	Le pouvoir du mal	Krzysztof Zanussi	France, West Germany, Italy
Signé Renart		Michel Soutter	France, Switzerland
The Runner	Davandeh	Amir Naderi	Iran
Queen Kelly (1929)		Erich von Stroheim	United States
Shanghai Blues	上海之夜	Hark Tsui	Hong Kong

== Independent Sections ==
=== Venice International Film Critics' Week ===
The following feature films were selected to be screened as In Competition for this section:

English title	Original title	Director(s)	Production country
Ain't Nothin' Without You	Nicht nichts ohne Dich	Pia Frankenberg	West Germany
The Disciples	A tanítványok	Géza Bereményi	Hungary
Fandango		Kevin Reynolds	United States
The Record	Der Rekord	Daniel Helfer	West Germany, Switzerland
A Strange Love Affair		Eric de Kuyper, Paul Verstraten	Netherlands
Yesterday		Radosław Piwowarski	Poland
Wanderers of the Desert	El Haimoune	Nacer Khemir	Tunisia, France

== Official Awards ==
=== Main Competition ===
- Golden Lion: Vagabond by Agnès Varda
- Grand Special Jury Prize: Tangos, the Exile of Gardel by Fernando Solanas
- Special Jury Prize: The Lightship by Jerzy Skolimowski
- Silver Lion: Dust by Marion Hänsel
- Volpi Cup for Best Actor: Gérard Depardieu for Police
- Volpi Cup for Best Actress: NOT ASSIGNED. (The jury deemed the best performances to be Sandrine Bonnaire (Vagabond) and Jane Birkin (Dust), but decided against awarding the prize as both films won major awards)
  - Volpi Cup Special mentions:
    - Sonja Savić for Life Is Beautiful
    - Galya Novents for The Tango of Our Childhood
    - Themis Bazaka for Stone Years

=== Career Golden Lion ===
- Federico Fellini

=== Special Lion ===
- John Huston
- Manoel de Oliveira

== Independent Awards ==
=== Sergio Trasatti Awards ===
- Manoel de Oliveira for The Satin Slipper
  - Special Mention: Juraj Jakubisko for The Feather Fairy
