= Nostos: The Return =

1989 film by Franco Piavoli

- Film poster
- Directed by: Franco Piavoli
- Screenplay by: Franco Piavoli
- Based on: the Odyssey by Homer
- Produced by: Franco Piavoli; Giannandrea Pecorelli
- Starring: Luigi Mezzanotte; Branca De Camargo
- Cinematography: Franco Piavoli
- Edited by: Franco Piavoli
- Music by: Luca Tessadrelli; Giuseppe Mazzucca
- Production companies: Zefiro Film; Immagininazione
- Distributed by: Mikado Film
- Release dates: 6 August 1989 (Locarno); 26 May 1990 (Italy)
- Running time: 87 minutes
- Country: Italy
- Languages: Fictional (inspired by ancient Greek, Sanskrit, and Latin)

Nostos: The Return (Italian: Nostos: Il ritorno) is a 1989 Italian adventure drama film directed by Franco Piavoli, based on Homer's Odyssey. Starring Luigi Mezzanotte and Branca De Camargo, it follows Odysseus' homeward journey across the Mediterranean Sea following the Trojan War, and his struggles against natural obstacles and inner torments.

Exploring themes of homecoming, memory of war, time, and man's relationship with nature; it relies on visual storytelling and the portrayal of nature rather than a conventional narrative. Dialogue is minimal, without subtitles, and spoken in an imaginary Mediterranean language (inspired by ancient Greek, Sanskrit, and Latin).

Nostos: The Return was Piavoli's first feature-length fiction film, even though he began his filmmaking career in the 1950s. Piavoli was in control of most of the creative process, which included casting actors with little acting experience. The pre-production, filming, and editing, took one year each to complete.

The film premiered at the 42nd Locarno Film Festival on 6 August 1989, and received a limited release in Italy by Mikado Film in 26 May 1990. Reception has been largely positive, with critics describing the film's depiction of nature as beautiful. The story has been interpreted as a lyrical version of Homer's epic poem, as a simplified retelling, and as an original narrative.

== Plot ==
Odysseus, (Note: The character is never named in the film. Piavoli has referred to him as both Odysseus (Italian: Ulisse) and Nostos.) who is exhausted, is on a ship together with a crew of several men. He has flashbacks of his childhood, which are followed by a vision of dead bodies in the sea and memories of brutal scenes from the Trojan War in which he encounters suffering civilians. The ship docks and Odysseus goes ashore alone to explore a cave. He hears strange singing and calls out for his mother. (Note: According to Lapeña Marchena, this segment recalls Odysseus' visit to Hades and his meeting with his mother Anticlea.) Returning from the cave, he finds his crew missing and goes to explore the inland. Odysseus walks through a rocky dwelling place that is populated by nude men and women who are seemingly unable to move. He finds a woman who silently opens a large seashell and lets him embrace her. (Note: Carlorosi identifies the woman with the shell as Circe.) He wakes up in a cave where several people, including his crew, are sleeping; he wakes up his crew and sets off with them.

During the voyage, the sea is calm for a period but singing is heard, a female figure briefly appears in the water, and a sudden storm wrecks the ship. Odysseus wakes up alone on a beach; he watches clothes and helmets that have floated ashore and cries out in torment. Wandering for a while, he observes the rich flora and fauna of the location and then meets a woman who lets him seduce her. (Note: Piavoli has referred to the woman as Calypso. According to Lapeña Marchena, she is a mix of the Odyssey's Calypso, Circe, and Nausicaa.) He stays with her, enjoying their time together, but is affected by memories of his childhood and homeland.

Odysseus sets off alone on a simple raft that soon falls apart; while swimming in the sea at night, he has auditory hallucinations of warfare. The sounds go away and Odysseus focuses on the moon. He has a vision in which he walks through a somber landscape with ruins; he reaches his palace but the building is a dark underground passage in which he finds human skulls. He runs toward the light at the end of the passage and appears to fall into the sea.

Waking up on a beach again, Odysseus walks across the land, which this time is full of animals and greenery, and reaches his palace. The entrance is the same as in the earlier vision and the sun is shining. In the building's atrium, a girl is rolling a hoop, mirroring a recurring scene from Odysseus' childhood memories. Through a window, he sees the shadow of a woman as she puts flowers in a vase and he quietly says the name Penelope. In the final shot, a woman folds a piece of fabric and places it in a chest.

== Themes and analysis ==
=== Nostos ===
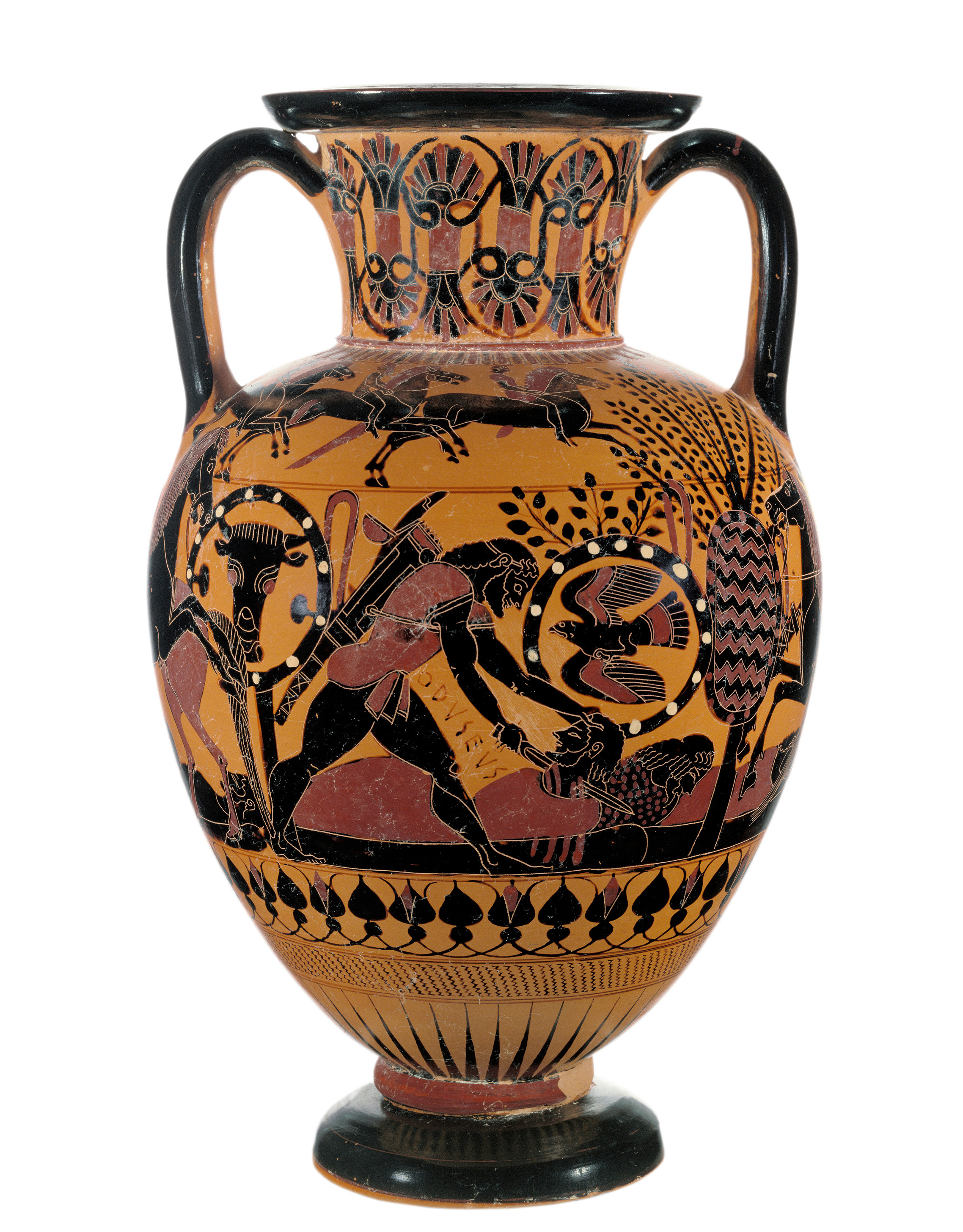
The film portrays the journey home after the experience of war. This amphora dated to c. 540 BC shows Odysseus killing an enemy.

Central to Nostos: The Return is the theme of homecoming—known as nostos in Homer's Odyssey—which is illustrated throughout the film by images of childhood. Piavoli describes the film's main concern as the conflict between man's drive to explore and his need to have a steady point of reference. Running in parallel with this is a theme of aggression and reconsideration. Piavoli says he thinks the story of Odysseus speaks to modern people because it expresses the timeless human needs for discovery, knowledge, and adventure. He thinks ancient stories remain relevant because new myths are linked to the myths of the ancient world.

The return of Odysseus to his palace contains a theme of regained identity, birthright, and social position. In Nostos: The Return, this is treated in a discreet and non-violent way, omitting the slaughter of the suitors from the original poem. The film's treatment of memory also differs from Homer's; in Nostos: The Return, the main character's memories of his homeland, childhood, and wartime experience appear to be intrinsic to his journey whereas, in the Odyssey, Odysseus continuously struggles against the risk of forgetting. According to the historian Óscar Lapeña Marchena, the journey in the film can be understood as an attempt to escape from the memory of war and destruction. This is illustrated by the flashback scenes from Troy, where there are no Trojan warriors but only civilians who are killed as they try to flee; at one point, the Greek soldiers appear to realize this and look horrified. Aldo Lastella of La Repubblica described the film's story as "a circular journey, a continuous return" that begins in childhood, goes through the experience of war and violence and ends in childhood. (Note: Original quotation: "è un viaggio circolare, un ritorno continuo.")

=== Language and symbols ===
As is typical in the films of the director Franco Piavoli, Nostos: The Return is driven by images and natural sounds rather than dialogue. Spoken dialogue is scarce and, as described in the opening credits, is "inspired by sounds of ancient Mediterranean languages". (Note: Original quotation: "I dialoghi del film sono ispirati a suoni di antiche lingue mediterranee.") Words and sounds are drawn from the Thessaly dialect of ancient Greek, Sanskrit, and Latin. No subtitles are provided for this invented language; Piavoli says he wants the viewers to lose themselves in the film through "the pleasure of the purely phonetic value of words". (Note: Original quotation: "Il piacere del valore puramente fonetico delle parole") The film uses single-word utterances that audiences may understand, such as mater ("mother"), which Odysseus says in the cave early in the film, and oikós ("home"), which he says while delirious in the sea. According to Lapeña Marchena, the approach to language suggests a view of the Mediterranean Sea as the originator of several cultures and an ambition to use language as "primary, pure sounds" that are recognizable for these cultures. The Italian studies scholar Silvia Carlorosi likens the film's language to the way babies communicate with their mothers. She connects the film's language and imagery to the influence of Giambattista Vico, a philosopher who regarded poetry and metaphors as the original form of human communication and had both a cyclical and progressive view of history.

According to Piavoli, the child playing with a hoop is a "symbol of time seen as an element that turns in on itself. A child pushing a circle expresses the conception of time as seen by scientists, something circular and linear ... time as a succession of points in an infinite line that runs from the past to the future." (Note: Original quotation: "è il simbolo del tempo visto come elemento che gira su se stesso. Il cerchio fatto girare da un bambino esprime entrambe le concezioni del tempo espresso dagli scienziati, quella circolare e quella lineare ... tempo come successione di punti su una linea infinita che corre dal passato al futuro") The water in the film symbolizes life and the ability to bring memories and emotions to the surface. The moon occurs throughout Piavoli's filmography as something imposing that brings calm and tranquility. In one scene, Odysseus is seen from above as he swims toward the reflection of the moon in the water, which Piavoli says looks like a sperm moving toward an egg; the search for something steadfast is portrayed as a yearning to return to the embryonic stage. Other visual symbols include the scene in which a woman gives Odysseus a seashell, representing sex, and pomegranates and a dove at the end, symbolizing enduring life and newfound peace. The pomegranate is a traditional symbol for fertility and is used as such in several of Piavoli's films.

Colour and light are used to convey meaning and moods. The early part of the film uses gloomy reds and yellows to evoke the fire of battles and the despair of war. As the main character regains harmony with the world, the colours of blooming fruits and greenery become prominent against a backdrop of dark blue and green mountains.

=== Nature ===
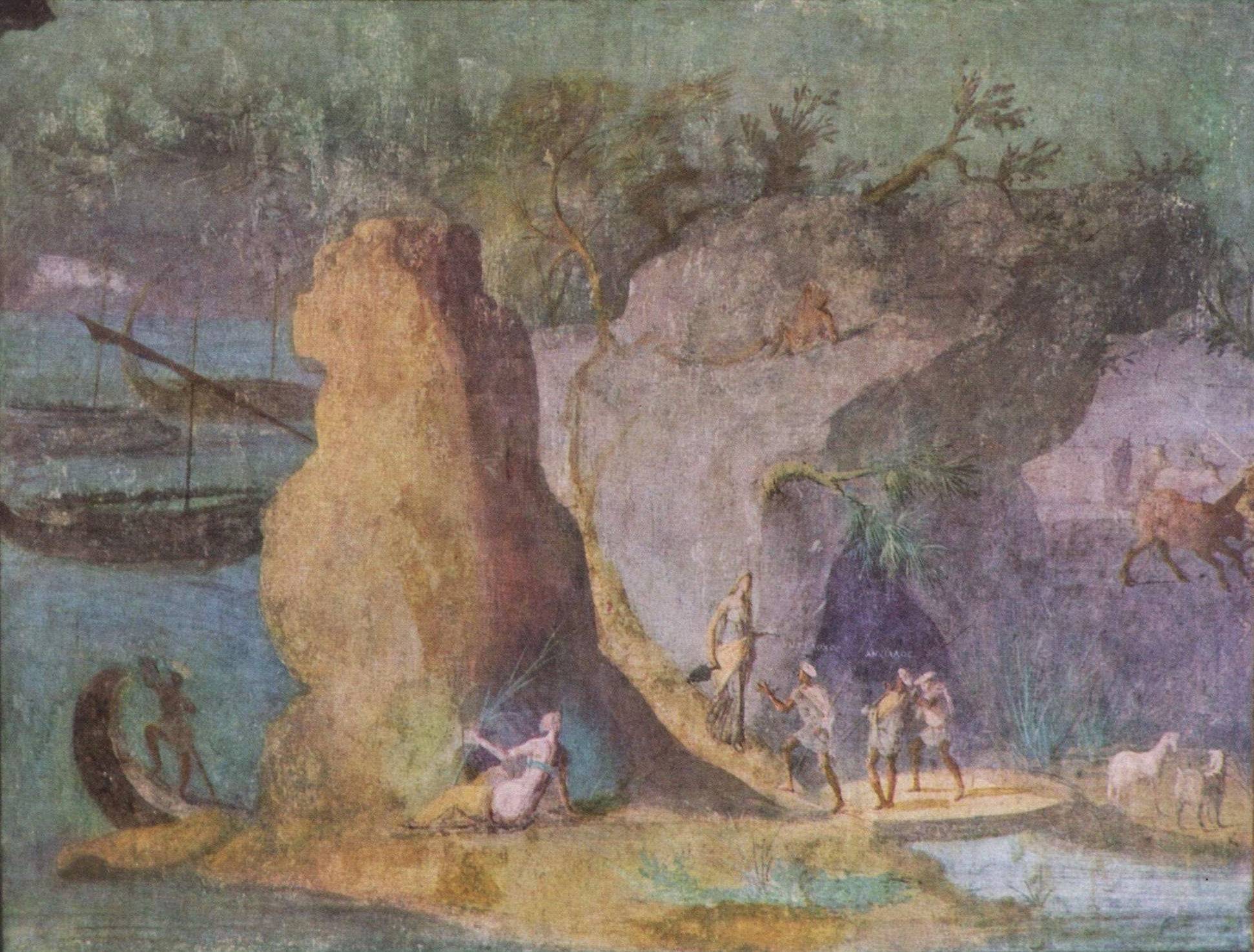
Scene from the Odyssey on a Roman landscape painting from the first century BC, found in the domus of via Graziosa in Rome

Nostos: The Return puts a significant focus on the movements and visual appearances of nature, which makes the human hero of the story relatively anonymous. The main character appears as a generic human who makes an emotional discovery of the natural world. The motif of homecoming co-exists with a theme of man's union with nature; the main character's journey and the presence of the sea, earth, flowers, and the moon suggest a desire for a primitive harmony in which humans and nature are one. Piavoli has said his approach to nature is inspired by the poetry of Giacomo Leopardi, who he said portrayed nature with literary equivalents of cinematic close-ups, wide shots, and sound. According to Piavoli, Leopardi used the interplay of these techniques to create a sense of the eternal. Piavoli has highlighted the film's love scenes, in which the portrayal of human love among the images and sounds of nature was inspired by Leopardi.

Lapeña Marchena writes that Piavoli's ambition may have been to go to the source of the Odysseus myth, located in the nature of the pre-Homeric Mediterranean world, which may explain why no gods appear as on-screen characters. The gods, who in Homer's poem rule over men, animals, and plants, may be seen as manifest in nature. According to the film historian Gian Piero Brunetta, Piavoli seems to search for the roots of Mediterranean mythology and thereby the origin of Western civilization. Brunetta also writes that Piavoli, from his earliest films, has taken an interest in the pre-Socratic roots of Western thought, Darwinism, and the ability to evoke a deep sense of meaning through the portrayal of nature.

== Production ==
=== Development ===
Piavoli (born 1933) was interested in poetry, painting, and music from an early age, and he studied law at the University of Pavia. He began to make short films in the 1950s and in the early-to-mid 1960s, his series of short films received positive attention from critics. After this, he settled in his hometown Pozzolengo, Brescia, and did not release more films until 1982, when his first feature-length documentary film Blue Planet became a critical success. His next major film project and his first full-length fiction film was Nostos: The Return. As he had done with Blue Planet, he envisioned it as a symphonic film, a form he says differs from theatrical cinema in the same way symphonic music differs from opera and other forms of theatrical music.

The basic story material in Nostos: The Return comes from the ancient Greek epic poem the Odyssey by Homer. Piavoli was especially inspired by book XXIII, which narrates Odysseus' need to convince his wife Penelope of his identity after he returns to his kingdom in Ithaca. The approach to the source material is intentionally ambiguous; elements of the film were also inspired by Apollonius of Rhodes' Argonautica and Virgil's Aeneid.

Nostos: The Return was produced by Piavoli and Giannandrea Pecorelli through the companies Zefiro Film and Immagininazione. It received financial support from Italy's Ministry of Tourism and Entertainment. The lead actors Luigi Mezzanotte (Odysseus) and Branca De Camargo (Calypso) were among the few cast members with previous experience of film and television. Some of the other cast members were theatre actors from the Laboratorio Teatro Settimo in Turin and some were non-professionals. The actors who are credited by name are Mezzanotte, De Camargo, Alex Carozzo, Paola Agosti, Giuseppe Marcoli, and Mariella Fabbris. The costumes were created by Ferruccio Bolognesi.

=== Filming and post-production ===
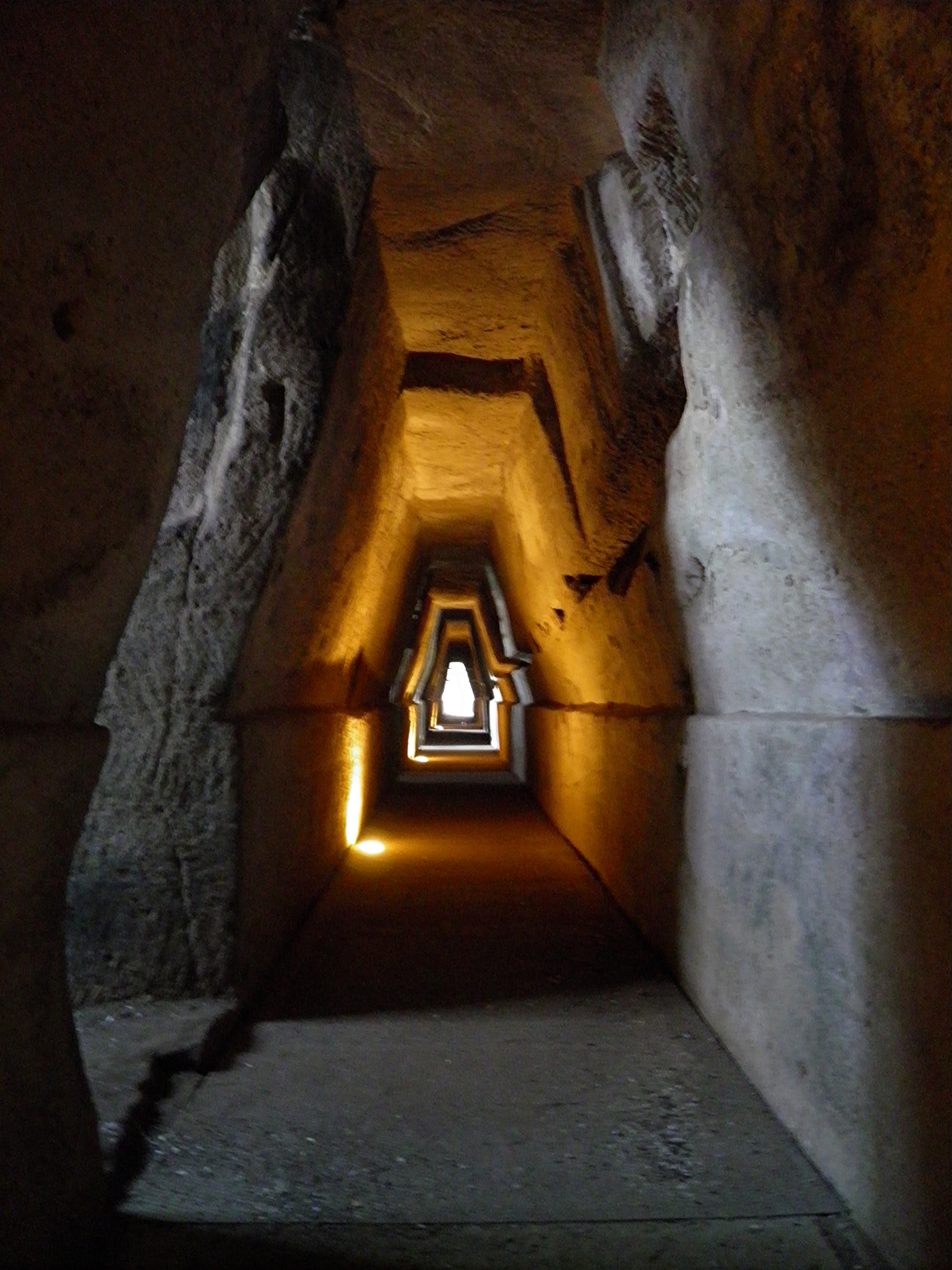
The Cave of the Sibyl in Cumae

After one year of preparation, Nostos: The Return took one year to film. Much of the filming was done at Piavoli's house and in the vicinity of Pozzolengo. Other locations include Lake Garda, the Brenta Dolomites and the Roman ruins in Sirmione, and places in Sardinia, Veneto, Etruria and Lazio. Scenes from Odysseus' palace were shot at the 16th-century Villa Della Torre in the Province of Verona. The Cave of the Sibyl in Cumae was used to portray the absence of light. The ship's sail was soaked in petrol to make it look old and worn. Piavoli did not set out to imitate a particular visual artist but the marine paintings of Francesco Guardi became a reference point in the depiction of disorientation at sea.

As with all of his films, Piavoli had nearly complete control over the production and is credited as writer, producer, director, cinematographer, editor, and sound editor. His wife Neria Poli is credited for "artistic collaboration". Piavoli had his own film laboratory and Moviola in his house. Editing took one year; there was enough recorded material to make nine films. The soundtrack features original music by Luca Tessadrelli and Giuseppe Mazzucca, as well as music by the composers Gianandrea Gazzola, Luciano Berio, Alexander Borodin, Rudolf Maros, and Claudio Monteverdi. The last section from Monteverdi's Vespro della Beata Vergine is heard during the film's final scene.

== Release ==
Nostos: The Return premiered on 6 August 1989 outside of competition at the Locarno Festival. Other festival screenings included the 1990 Mill Valley Film Festival and the Moscow International Film Festival. Mikado Film released the film in Italian cinemas on 26 May 1990. The release was limited to a few locations in the major cities, in part because few cinemas were open. Italian cinemas usually close for a period in the summer and in 1990, many operators closed almost a month earlier than usual due to the 1990 FIFA World Cup, which was held in Italy and provided tough competition in the entertainment business.

Medusa Home Entertainment released Nostos: The Return in Italy on DVD in 2008. Another DVD edition was released in 2015 by CG Entertainment. In 2017, the French company Potemkine collaborated with the festival Cinéma du Réel to release a double DVD containing Blue Planet and Nostos: The Return.

== Reception ==
After the first screening of Nostos: The Return in Locarno, Sauro Borelli of the newspaper L'Unità called the film a masterpiece. Writing he could understand objections that it relies too much on Baroque aesthetics, he nevertheless called it "simply beautiful". (Note: Original quotation: "Per noi il nuovo film di Piavoli è semplicemente bellissimo.") Upon the Italian release, the same critic called the film sublime in its portrayal of a dialectic between nature and culture. La Repubblica's Paolo D'Agostini wrote the use of symbols is powerful, the editing captures the rhythms of nature and the film should be able to affect also those who are sceptical of the variety of cinema it belongs to. He compared it to Soviet avant-garde cinema from the 1920s and Joris Ivens' last film, A Tale of the Wind. Alberto Pesce of the Rivista del cinematografo wrote he was impressed by the visuals and sound alike, and that the film's components blend into a beautiful and concrete whole. Pesce was one of several Italian critics who approached the film as a lyrical version of the Odyssey; other approaches have included those of the film critic Massimo Maisetti, who in a 2006 text interpreted it as an original story with references to Homer, and the sociologists Maurizio Ambrosini and Camilla Bartolini, who in a 2012 book viewed it as a simplified but successful retelling of the Odyssey.

In his book of film reviews Il Mereghetti, Paolo Mereghetti gives Nostos: The Return a rating of two and a half stars out of four. He calls the cinematography beautiful and the film fascinating for people who enjoy poetic cinema but writes the film can be disconcerting and boring and suffers when viewed on a television screen. In 2008, Mary Hanlon of The Brooklyn Rail wrote that the film contains unintentional humour that stems from the performances and erotic symbols, but also some of "the most incredible, fluid, and abstract visual sequences I've ever seen". In 2020, Ross McDonnell wrote in a feature article for Sight & Sound's website that Nostos: The Return stands out in Piavoli's filmography because of its level of ambition and its relatively conventional dramatic storytelling. McDonnell wrote the film "surrealistically decentres its human protagonist by placing him amidst a dangerous, unforgiving and unfathomable force of nature", subverting the sense of wonder found in Piavoli's earlier Blue Planet.

Nostos: The Return received the OPL Moti Ibrahim award at the 1990 Djerba Festival in Tunisia and the 1990 Premio AIACE from the Turin-based Associazione Italiana Amici del Cinema d'Essai.

== See also ==
- List of films based on Greco-Roman mythology
