= Toronto International Film Festival International Critics' Prizes =

Annual Canadian film award

The Toronto International Film Festival International Critics' Prizes, currently known as the FIPRESCI Prizes, are film awards presented by the International Federation of Film Critics (FIPRESCI) to films screening at the Toronto International Film Festival.

== History ==
First presented in 1982 as the CFTO International Critics' Prize, the award was voted by all media attending the festival, and could be presented annually to one film, two films or one film with an honorable mention. In 1992, FIPRESCI launched an award at the festival to honour the best film by a first-time director, as selected by an appointed jury of eight international film critics, while the original International Critics' Prize was renamed the Metro Media Award, and continued to be voted on by all accredited media who were not on the FIPRESCI jury.

The Metro Media Award was discontinued after 1998, and replaced with the Discovery Award, which continued to be voted on by all accredited media. In 2008, the awards were modified to present two FIPRESCI awards, one each for films in the festival's Discovery and Special Presentations streams; a media-voted Discovery award was still presented that year alongside the FIPRESCI Discovery award, but was discontinued thereafter.

Since 2020, only a single FIPRESCI Prize winner has been named each year.

== Winners ==
=== International Critics' Prize ===
Year	Film	Director(s)	Ref
1982	Veronika Voss	Rainer Werner Fassbinder	
1982	The Taste of Water (De smaak van water)	Orlow Seunke	
1983	The Fourth Man	Paul Verhoeven	
1984	Choose Me	Alan Rudolph	
1985	My American Cousin	Sandy Wilson	
1985	No Surrender	Alan Bleasdale	
1986	Man Facing Southeast	Eliseo Subiela	
1987	Night Zoo (Un zoo la nuit)	Jean-Claude Lauzon	
1988	Distant Voices, Still Lives	Terence Davies	
1989	Jesus of Montreal (Jésus de Montréal)	Denys Arcand	
1990	An Angel at My Table	Jane Campion	
1991	My Own Private Idaho	Gus Van Sant	

=== Metro Media Award ===
Year	Film	Director(s)	Ref
1992	Man Bites Dog	Benoît Poelvoorde, Rémy Belvaux, André Bonzel	
1993	Naked	Mike Leigh	
1994	Heavenly Creatures	Peter Jackson	
1995	La Cérémonie	Claude Chabrol	
1996	Shine	Scott Hicks	
1997	Boogie Nights	Paul Thomas Anderson	
1997	L.A. Confidential	Curtis Hanson	
1998	Happiness	Todd Solondz	

=== Discovery Award ===
Year	Film	Director(s)	Ref
1999	Goat on Fire and Smiling Fish	Kevin Jordan	
2000	George Washington	David Gordon Green	
2000	101 Reykjavík	Baltasar Kormákur	
2001	Chicken Rice War	Chee Kong Cheah	
2002	The Magdalene Sisters	Peter Mullan	
2003	Rhinoceros Eyes	Aaron Woodley	
2004	Omagh	Pete Travis	
2005	Look Both Ways	Sarah Watt	
2006	Reprise	Joachim Trier	
2007	Cochochi	Israel Cárdenas, Laura Amelia Guzmán	
2008	Hunger	Steve McQueen	

=== FIPRESCI Prize ===
Year	Film	Director(s)	Category	Ref
1992	Reservoir Dogs	Quentin Tarantino	Winner	
1993	Strapped	Forest Whitaker	Winner	
1994	The Silences of the Palace	Moufida Tlatli	Winner	
1994	Fate (Verhängnis)	Fred Kelemen	Honorable mention	
1995	Desolation Angels	Tim McCann	Winner	
1995	Eggs	Bent Hamer	Winner	
1996	Life	Lawrence Johnston	Winner	
1996	The Daytrippers	Greg Mottola	Honorable mention	
1997	Under the Skin	Carine Adler	Winner	
1998	West Beirut	Ziad Doueiri	Winner	
1998	Praise	John Curran	Winner	
1999	Shower	Zhang Yang	Winner	
2000	Bangkok Dangerous	Pang Fat & Oxide Pang Chun	Winner	
2001	Inch'Allah Dimanche	Yamina Benguigui	Winner	
2001	Be My Star (Mein Stern)	Valeska Grisebach	Honorable mention	
2001	Khaled	Asghar Massombagi	Honorable mention	
2002	Under Another Sky (Les chemins de l'oued)	Gaël Morel	Winner	
2002	Open Hearts	Susanne Bier	Honorable mention	
2003	Noviembre	Achero Mañas	Winner	
2004	In My Father's Den	Brad McGann	Winner	
2005	Sa-kwa	Kang Yi-kwan	Winner	
2006	Death of a President	Gabriel Range	Winner	
2007	La Zona	Rodrigo Plá	Winner	
2008	Disgrace	Steve Jacobs	Special Presentations	
2008	Lymelife	Derick Martini	Discovery	
2009	Hadewijch	Bruno Dumont	Special Presentations	
2009	The Man Beyond the Bridge	Laxmikant Shetgaonkar	Discovery	
2010	L'Amour fou	Pierre Thoretton	Special Presentations	
2010	Beautiful Boy	Shawn Ku	Discovery	
2011	The First Man	Gianni Amelio	Special Presentations	
2011	Avalon	Axel Petersén	Discovery	
2012	In the House	François Ozon	Special Presentations	
2012	Call Girl	Mikael Marcimain	Discovery	
2013	Ida	Paweł Pawlikowski	Special Presentations	
2013	The Amazing Catfish	Claudia Sainte-Luce	Discovery	
2014	Time Out of Mind	Oren Moverman	Special Presentations	
2014	May Allah Bless France!	Abd al Malik	Discovery	
2015	Desierto	Jonás Cuarón	Special Presentations	
2015	Eva Nová	Marko Skop	Discovery	
2016	I Am Not Madame Bovary	Feng Xiaogang	Special Presentations	
2016	Kati Kati	Mbithi Masya	Discovery	
2017	The Motive	Manuel Martín Cuenca	Special Presentations	
2017	Ava	Sadaf Foroughi	Discovery	
2018	Skin	Guy Nattiv	Special Presentations, Winner	
2018	A Faithful Man	Louis Garrel	Special Presentations, Honorable Mention	
2018	Float Like a Butterfly	Carmel Winters	Discovery, Winner	
2018	Twin Flower	Laura Luchetti	Discovery, Honorable Mention	
2019	How to Build a Girl	Coky Giedroyc	Special Presentations	
2019	Murmur	Heather Young	Discovery	
2020	Beginning (Dasatskisi)	Dea Kulumbegashvili	Winner	
2021	Anatolian Leopard (Anadolu Leoparı)	Emre Kayiş	Winner	
2022	A Gaza Weekend	Basil Khalil	Winner	
2023	Seagrass	Meredith Hama-Brown	Winner	
2024	Mother Mother	K'naan Warsame	Winner	
2025	Forastera	Lucía Aleñar Iglesias	Winner	
2026	Ancestors	David Turpin	Winner	
