= Franco Piavoli =

Italian film director

- Born: June 21, 1933 (age 92); Pozzolengo, Lombardy, Kingdom of Italy
- Occupations: Film director, screenwriter, producer
- Spouse: Neria Poli

Franco Piavoli (born 21 June 1933) is an Italian film director, screenwriter, and producer.

== Biography ==
Piavoli studied law at the University of Pavia in Lombardy. Throughout the 1950s and 1960s he made a number of short films: Uccellanda (1953), Ambulatorio (1954), Incidente (1955), La stagioni (1960), Domenica sera (1962), Emigranti (1963), and Evasi (1964).

Nearly 20 years later, Piavoli released his first feature film Blue Planet in 1982, which competed at the 39th Venice International Film Festival. Piavoli directed Nostos: The Return in 1989, a film inspired by Ulysses' return to Ithaca in the Odyssey, and contains only sparse dialogue that imitates "sounds of ancient Mediterranean languages". Piavoli then released his third feature film Voices Through Time in 1996, first screening at the 53rd Venice International Film Festival.

In 2009, Piavoli worked with Ermanno Olmi on Olmi's documentary about food production Terra Madre.

== Filmography ==
Feature films

- Blue Planet (1982)
- Nostos: The Return (1989)
- Voices Through Time (1996)
- At the First Breath of Wind (2002)
- Tender Presence (2004)
- Feast (2016)

Short films

- Surgery (1954)
- Sul lago di Garda (1959)
- The Seasons (1961)
- Sunday Evening (1962)
- Emigrants (1963)
- Convicts (1964)
- Lucid Deceptions (1986)
- Il parco del Mincio (1987)
- Landscapes and Figures (2002)
- Lo zebù e la stella (2007)
- The Flora Garden (2009)
- Là dove scorre il Mincio (2011)
- Fragments (2012)
- Untitled segment in Venice 70: Future Reloaded (2013)
