= Voices Through Time =

- Film poster
- Directed by: Franco Piavoli
- Screenplay by: Franco Piavoli
- Produced by: Franco Piavoli; Laura Cafierov; Giannandrea Pecorelli
- Cinematography: Franco Piavoli
- Edited by: Franco Piavoli
- Music by: Alfredo Catalini; Franco Ghigini; Johann Pachelbel
- Production companies: Zefiro Film; Immagininazione; RAI Uno
- Distributed by: Mikado Film
- Release dates: 1 September 1996 (Venice Film Festival); 12 November 1997 (France)
- Running time: 86 minutes
- Country: Italy
- Language: Italian

Voices Through Time (Italian: Voci nel tempo) (Note: Sometimes called Voices in Time) is a 1996 Italian documentary and drama film directed by Franco Piavoli. Filmed in the Lombardy village of Castellaro Lagusello, it depicts scenes of daily life and nature over the course of a year, structured around the four seasons.

== Plot ==
Voices Through Time is a film exploring the stages of life, from the carefree games of childhood to the complex emotions of adolescence. It explores the spirit of nature, the highs and lows of dating, love, marriage, and health, whilst reflecting on the inevitable nostalgia for youth in the prime or later years of adulthood.

The film is divided into four seasonal segments, each associated with a distinct colour. Spring shows newborns and children at play. Summer focuses on early experiences of romance, such as teenagers gathering around a village well. Autumn depicts older residents listening to an opera aria at the same location. As Winter sets in, scenes of melancholy unfold, with an elderly man in poor health or on his deathbed. The film concludes with a grandfather and grandson walking through the countryside, amidst other young children playing on the ice. These select scenes are interspersed with depictions of everyday village activities and the surrounding ever-changing natural environment.

== Production ==
Voices Through Time was filmed in Castellaro Lagusello, a small village in the province of Mantua, Lombardy. The cast consists of non-professional actors who are residents of the village. Piavoli served as director, cinematographer, editor, and sound designer. Foley artist Paolo Frati contributed to the recreation of nature sounds used in the film’s soundtrack.

The film is Piavoli's third feature-film. Unlike his 1982 debut, Blue Planet, which has a stronger focus on nature, Voices Through Time places an increased emphasis on the human element.

== Release ==
The film premiered on 1 September 1996 at the 53rd Venice International Film Festival and was released theatrically in France on 12 November 1997.

== Reception ==
At the Venice festival, Piavoli won the FEDIC Award and was nominated for Best Cinematography at both the Silver Ribbon Awards and the Golden Goblets.

Critical reception has been positive. James Lattimer of Cinema Scope rated it 5 out of 5 stars, calling it 'a catalogue of gazes like yearning, joyous, inquisitive, impassive, that equally functions as a cartography of the visage over time.' Italian critic Giorgio Sedona described it as 'a lyrical and realistic symphony,' and 'poetry without a poet,' praising Piavoli’s focus on cyclical human and natural processes. Writing in Variety, David Stratton characterised the work as 'a poetic vision of life in a picturesque Italo village,' with 'placid beauty,' but noted its expected limited commercial and critical potential outside Italy.
