= Summer Lovers =

1982 film by Randal Kleiser

- Theatrical release poster
- Directed by: Randal Kleiser
- Written by: Randal Kleiser
- Produced by: Mike Moder
- Starring: Peter Gallagher; Daryl Hannah; Valérie Quennessen; Barbara Rush; Carole Cook
- Cinematography: Timothy Galfas
- Edited by: Robert Gordon
- Music by: Basil Poledouris
- Production company: Research Corporation
- Distributed by: Filmways
- Release date: July 16, 1982
- Running time: 98 minutes
- Country: United States
- Language: English
- Box office: $5 million (US)

Summer Lovers is a 1982 American romantic comedy-drama film written and directed by Randal Kleiser and starring Peter Gallagher, Daryl Hannah, and Valerie Quennessen. It was filmed on location on the island of Santorini, Greece. The original music score is composed by Basil Poledouris. Summer Lovers features the songs "Hard to Say I'm Sorry", a number-one single for Chicago, and "I'm So Excited" by the Pointer Sisters.

The film received generally negative reviews from critics.

== Plot ==
Recent college graduates and high school sweethearts Michael Pappas and Cathy Featherstone, a young American couple, spend their summer vacation at a rented hillside villa on the Greek island of Santorini. When they visit a nude beach crowded with other young tourists, Michael explores a nearby cave and notices a young woman sunbathing topless, with whom he exchanges glances. The next day, using binoculars, he spots the same woman standing outside a villa across the hill. Later, on his way to buy groceries, Michael runs into the woman and proceeds to follow her around town.

Meanwhile, Cathy takes up photography and builds a darkroom in the bathroom. Despite being widely perceived as a "goody two-shoes", Cathy shares her sexual fantasies with Michael. Guided by a book of sexual techniques, she ties him to the bed and drips candle wax on his chest. While driving alone in town, Michael encounters the mysterious woman—Lina, a French archaeologist on temporary assignment at the nearby Akrotiri excavation. The two take a bus to the beach, where they skinny-dip before having sex in a secluded cave.

Overcome with guilt, Michael admits his infidelity to Cathy but insists that he loves her. Upset, Cathy storms off after telling him to "get it out of his system", which he takes as permission to return to Lina. That night, while Michael and Lina resume their affair, Cathy goes to a local bar intending to sleep with another man as revenge for Michael's indiscretion. She meets a young Greek man who takes her to his house, but she flees as he attempts to kiss her. When Michael comes home in the morning, Cathy is still angry at him.

Cathy goes to Lina's villa to confront her, but Lina assures Cathy that she does not intend to steal Michael away from her, while explaining that she has come to Greece to escape her complicated life. As the three of them start spending time together, Cathy is initially jealous seeing Michael and Lina together, but soon grows closer to Lina and agrees to take photographs of her excavation. The women confide in each other about their conservative parents, as well as Lina's past relationships, and Lina encourages Cathy to take more risks in her life.

One evening, Cathy encourages Michael to kiss Lina in front of her, and the three subsequently spend the night together. As Lina moves in with Michael and Cathy, they embark on a three-way relationship. Michael and Cathy throw a surprise birthday party for Lina, who tearfully laments the imminent end of their relationship once her American lovers return home. The next morning, Cathy's mother Jean and her friend Barbara arrive for a surprise visit and later take the trio to dinner. Although Jean struggles to understand the trio's relationship, Cathy assures her mother that she has never been happier in her life.

Uncertain about her future with Michael and Cathy, and afraid of getting hurt, Lina distances herself from them and begins dating Jan Tolin, a young man she met at the beach. As Lina disappears, Michael and Cathy search for her but eventually conclude that she does not want to be found. Unable to enjoy their time on the island, they pack up to return home three weeks earlier than scheduled.

Having had a change of heart, Lina rushes over to Michael and Cathy's villa, only to discover they have already left. She rides a motorcycle to the airport and intercepts them just as they are about to board the plane. Overjoyed at seeing Lina again, Michael and Cathy return to spend the last three weeks of their vacation with her.

== Cast ==
- Peter Gallagher as Michael Pappas
- Daryl Hannah as Cathy Featherstone
- Valérie Quennessen as Lina
- Barbara Rush as Jean Featherstone
- Carole Cook as Barbara Foster
- Hans van Tongeren as Jan Tolin
- Lydia Lenosi as Aspa
- Vladimiros Kyriakidis (credited as Vladimiros Kiriakos) as Yorghos
- Carlos Rodriguez Ramos as Cosmo
- Rika Dialina as Monica
- Andreas Filipidis as Andreas
- Henri Béhar as a movie director
- Hilary Shepard (credited as Hillary Shapiro) as a camp fire girl

== Production ==
Summer Lovers with the screenplay by director Randal Kleiser was filmed from August to October 1981 primarily on the Greek island of Santorini. Scenes were also filmed on the islands of Crete, Delos, and Mykonos.

The production secured permission to film at Akrotiri an archaeological site. In an area of the site selected for its light and production values, Quennessen, under the supervision and instruction of an archaeologist, began work before the cameras. In November 2023, the Tampa Bay Times, citing IMDb, reported that, during the filming of the film, Valérie Quennessen, who played Lina, an archaeologist, discovered pottery at the Akrotiri site that was circa 3,500 years old.

Dutch actor Hans van Tongeren was visiting the area as a tourist when Daryl Hannah spotted him in the crowd. She arranged a meeting with the director and, subsequently, Van Tongeren was added to the cast as Jan. In a scene, actor Christopher Atkins was in a photograph published in a Greek magazine. Atkins had recently starred in The Blue Lagoon (1980) for director Randal Kleiser. Daryl Hannah's character remarks, "I used to dream I was a mermaid." Two years later, Daryl Hannah starred as a mermaid in Splash (1984).

Summer Lovers is the final theatrically released film of actress Valérie Quennessen, who played a working archaeologist. She retired from acting shortly after to raise her children and died in a car accident in 1989 at the age of 31. It was also the last film released by Filmways as it was already a new acquisition for Orion Pictures; on August 31, 1982, it was renamed with its parent's name, marking the end of the Filmways name.

== Soundtrack ==
Summer Lovers (Original Sound Track from the Filmways Motion Picture) was released in 1982.

Side 1
No.	Title	Artist	Length
1.	"Summer Lovers"	Michael Sembello	3:59
2.	"Just Can't Get Enough"	Depeche Mode	3:37
3.	"If Love Takes You Away"	Stephen Bishop	3:42
4.	"Johnny and Mary"	Tina Turner	4:13
5.	"Sea Cave"	Basil Poledouris	2:20

Side 2
No.	Title	Artist	Length
1.	"Do What Ya Wanna Do"	The Cage	3:30
2.	"Play to Win"	Heaven 17	3:34
3.	"Take Me Down to the Ocean"	Elton John	4:08
4.	"Crazy in the Night"	Tina Turner	3:53
5.	"Hard to Say I'm Sorry"	Chicago	3:50
6.	"Search for Lina"	Basil Poledouris	2:41

=== Charts ===
Chart (1983)	Peak position
Australia (Kent Music Report)	73

== Distribution ==
The film was shot flat (1.85:1), but all home video editions are in 1.33:1 (4:3) pan & scan ratio. Summer Lovers is erroneously listed as a scope (2.35:1) production in Leonard Maltin's movie guide, as well as the IMDb. In fact, the film's original press kit confirms that the film was shot in the 1.85:1 aspect ratio. Occasionally on the MGM HD network, the film is shown in 1:85.1 aspect ratio (16:9) in 1080i high definition. The film was available on Blu-ray on August 11, 2015 (limited edition to 3000). There are scenes in the film's trailer that do not appear in the final cut. German TV has shown a wider screen version than the DVD/Blu-ray releases, but with reduced vertical picture.

== Reception ==
Summer Lovers was poorly received by critics. On the review aggregator website Rotten Tomatoes, the film holds an approval rating of 25% based on eight reviews, with an average rating of 4.2/10.

Roger Ebert reviewed the film with two of four stars and noted that the film's central core was as a "beach film" but that the director's vision was confusing. "His problem, then, is that his insights keep interrupting the sex, and the sex keeps undermining the insights. The result is a movie that doesn't really work as semi-erotic romance, and never quite gets itself together as a character study." According to Ebert, it is "sort of fun, in a silly way", for which the engaging lead actors have to receive much of the credit.

When asked by David Letterman to give a recent example of bad taste, director John Waters said he loved the film because it was "about being young, rich, stupid and nude."

In 2015, Jim Hemphill wrote that "under Kleiser's relaxed but precise direction, their romantic adventures are incredibly erotic without ever coming across as 'dirty' or smarmy. Indeed, one of the most appealing aspects of Summer Lovers is the innocence both its protagonists and the film itself project – arriving between the sexual revolution and AIDS, the film has a wistful, lighthearted quality that would have been unthinkable a few years earlier or later. Gloriously photographed in a palette of tan skin against white sand and blue water (...)".

"He's pushing his luck this time. Presumably, he figured that if he increased the skin-in-the-sun atmosphere and added a titillating twist, the box-office returns would be even greater. But he forgot to add a story ..."

== Legacy ==
The villa that the Michael and Cathy characters stayed at was purchased by a couple in 1987 and made into a gift shop named "Summer Lovers".

The film is now considered a Cult Classic amongst Daryl Hannah fans and for increasing popularity and tourism to the country.
