= 39th Venice International Film Festival =

1982 film festival in Italy

- Festival poster
- Location: Venice, Italy
- Founded: 1932
- Awards: Golden Lion: The State of Things
- Festival date: 28 August – 2 September 1982
- Website: Website

Venice Film Festival chronology
- 40th 38th

The 39th annual Venice International Film Festival was held from 28 August to 2 September 1982.

French filmmaker Marcel Carné was the Jury President of the main competition. The Golden Lion winner was The State of Things directed by Wim Wenders.

== Jury ==
The following people comprised the 1982 jury:

- Marcel Carné, French filmmaker - Jury President
- Luis García Berlanga, Spanish filmmaker
- Mario Monicelli, Italian filmmaker
- Gillo Pontecorvo, Italian filmmaker
- Satyajit Ray, Indian filmmaker
- Andrei Tarkovsky, Soviet filmmaker
- Valerio Zurlini, Italian filmmaker

== Official Sections ==
The following films were selected to be screened:

=== In Competition ===
English title	Original title	Director(s)	Production country
Apprehension	Die Beunruhigung	Lothar Warneke	East Germany
The Big Brother	Le grand frère	Francis Girod	France
Blow to the Heart	Colpire al cuore	Gianni Amelio	Italy, France
Blue Planet	Il pianeta azzurro	Franco Piavoli	Italy
Chopin	Sciopèn	Luciano Odorisio	Italy
Crossroads	Grihajuddha	Buddhadev Dasgupta	India
The Dam	To fragma	Dimitris Makris	Greece
The Draughtsman's Contract		Peter Greenaway	United Kingdom
An Egyptian Story	حدوتة مصرية	Youssef Chahine	Egypt
Estoy en crisis		Fernando Colomo	Spain
The Eyes, the Mouth	Gli occhi, la bocca	Marco Bellocchio	Italy
Flight of the Eagle	Ingenjör Andrées luftfärd	Jan Troell	Sweden, West Germany, Norway
The Foreigner	A Estrangeira	João Mário Grilo	Portugal
A Good Marriage	Le Beau Mariage	Éric Rohmer	France
The Good Soldier	Il buon soldato	Franco Brusati	France
Grog		Francesco Laudadio	Italy
Guernica		Ferenc Kósa	West Germany, Hungary
Hero		Barney Platts-Mills	United Kingdom
The Hes Case	De smaak van water	Orlow Seunke	Netherlands
Imperative	Imperativ	Krzysztof Zanussi	Poland
Last Five Days	Fünf letzte Tage	Percy Adlon	West Germany
Private Life	Частная жизнь	Yuli Raizman	Soviet Union
Querelle		Rainer Werner Fassbinder	France
What Are We Waiting for to Be Happy!	Qu'est-ce qu'on attend pour être heureux!	Coline Serreau	France
The State of Things	Der Stand der Dinge	Wim Wenders	West Germany
Tempest		Paul Mazursky	United States
The Trout	La Truite	Joseph Losey	France
The Voice	Golos	Ilya Averbakh	Soviet Union

=== Out of Competition ===
English title	Original title	Director(s)	Production country
Agony	Агония	Elem Klimov	Soviet Union
Blade Runner		Ridley Scott	United States
A Midsummer Night's Sex Comedy		Woody Allen	United States

=== Mezzogiorno-Mezzanotte ===
A section devoted to spectacular films, remakes or eccentrics.

English title	Original title	Director(s)	Production country
36 Chowringhee Lane		Aparna Sen	India
Ana		Margarida Cordeiro, António Reis	Portugal
Boy (1969)	少年	Nagisa Ôshima	Japan
Come Back to the Five and Dime, Jimmy Dean, Jimmy Dean		Robert Altman	United States
Di padre in figlio		Vittorio Gassman, Alessandro Gassmann	Italy
East 103rd Street		Chris Menges	United Kingdom
E.T. the Extra-Terrestrial		Steve Spielberg	United States
Gasoline (1970)		Piero Bargellini	Italy
Gestures and Fragments: An Essay on the Military and Power	Gestos e Fragmentos	Alberto Seixas Santos	Portugal
Heaven's Gate (1980)		Michael Cimino	United States
Kagero-za		Seijun Suzuki	Japan
A Letter to Freddy Buache	Lettre à Freddy Buache	Jean-Luc Godard	France
Let's Spend the Night Together		Hal Ashby	United States
La notte dell'ultimo giorno		Adimaro Sala	Italy
On Top of the Whale	Het dak van de Walvis	Raoul Ruiz	Netherlands
Le Pont du Nord		Jacques Rivette	France
Naissance		Robert Kramer	France
Poltergeist		Tobe Hooper	United States
Les Sacrifiés		Okacha Touita	France
Sadgati		Satyajit Ray	India
The Spirit Moves: A History of Black Social Dance on Film		Mura Dehn	United States
Toute une nuit		Chantal Akerman	Belgium
The Valiant Ones (1975)	忠烈圖	King Hu	Taiwan, Hong Kong
Veronika Voss	Die Sehnsucht der Veronika Voss	Rainer Werner Fassbinder	West Germany
Une villa aux environs de New York		Benoît Jacquot	France
Victor/Victoria		Blake Edwards	United States

=== Venezia De Sica ===
English title	Original title	Director(s)	Production country
Beyond the Door	Oltre la porta	Liliana Cavani	Italy
Canto d'amore		Elda Tattoli	Italy
Catherine's Wedding	Il matrimonio di Caterina	Luigi Comencini	Italy
Core mio		Stefano Calanchi	Italy
Ehrengard		Emidio Greco	Italy
Giocare d'azzardo		Cinzia Th. Torrini	Italy
I Know That You Know That I Know	Io so che tu sai che io so	Alberto Sordi	Italy
Malamore		Eriprando Visconti	Italy
Sconcerto Rock		Luciano Manuzzi	Italy
Storia d'amore e d'amicizia		Franco Rossi	Italy
Tomorrow We Dance	Domani si balla!	Maurizio Nichetti	Italy
Vatican Conspiracy	Morte in Vaticano	Marcello Aliprandi	Italy
La voce		Brunello Rondi	Italy
What a Ghostly Silence There Is Tonight	Madonna che silenzio c'è stasera	Maurizio Ponzi	Italy

== Official Awards ==
The following awards were presented at the 39th edition:

=== In Competition ===
- Golden Lion: The State of Things by Wim Wenders
- Special Jury Prize: Imperative by Krzysztof Zanussi
- Silver Lion for Best First Work:
  - Sciopèn by Luciano Odorisio
  - The Hes Case by Orlow Seunke

=== Career Golden Lion ===
- Marcel Carné, Alessandro Blasetti, Luis Buñuel, Frank Capra, George Cukor, Jean-Luc Godard, Sergei Yutkevich, Alexander Kluge, Akira Kurosawa, Michael Powell, Satyajit Ray, King Vidor and Cesare Zavattini.

== Independent Awards ==
=== FIPRESCI Prize ===
- Agony by Elem Klimov
- The State of Things by Wim Wenders

=== OCIC Award ===
- Fünf letzte Tage by Percy Adlon
  - Honorable Mention: Imperative by Krzysztof Zanussi

=== UNICEF Award ===
- De smaak van water by Orlow Seunke

=== Pasinetti Award ===
- Best Film: Imperative by Krzysztof Zanussi
- Best Actor: Max von Sydow for Flight of the Eagle
- Best Actress: Susan Sarandon by Tempest

=== Pietro Bianchi Award ===
- Renato Castellani

=== Best Artistic Collaboration ===
- Mikhail Ulyanov for Private Life

=== Golden Phoenix ===
- Best Actor: Robert Powell for Imperative
- Best Actress: Béatrice Romand for Le Beau Mariage
