= Spetters =

1980 Dutch film

- Theatrical release poster
- Directed by: Paul Verhoeven
- Written by: Gerard Soeteman
- Produced by: Joop van den Ende
- Starring: Hans van Tongeren; Renée Soutendijk; Toon Agterberg; Maarten Spanjer; Marianne Boyer; Rutger Hauer; Jeroen Krabbé; Hugo Mesters
- Cinematography: Jost Vacano
- Edited by: Ine Schenkkan
- Music by: Kayak
- Distributed by: Tuschinski Film Distribution
- Release date: 25 February 1980
- Running time: 120 minutes
- Country: Netherlands
- Language: Dutch

Spetters (English translation: Splashes) is a 1980 Dutch erotic drama film directed by Paul Verhoeven. The film follows the lives of three young men who have little in common but their love for dirt-bike racing. Set on the outskirts of Rotterdam, the film depicts three characters who are hoping to escape a dead-end, working-class existence.

The film was a small success in the United States, and it helped launch the Hollywood careers of Verhoeven and some of the actors, including Jeroen Krabbé, Rutger Hauer and Renee Soutendijk.

== Plot ==
Rien and Hans are best friends who are aspiring motocross racers who hope to go pro one day. Their best friend is Eef, their mechanic. After a welcome home to national champion Gerrit Witkamp, the boys join Rien's girlfriend Maya, Truus, and Annette at a local disco, where Eef shows off his disco moves and Hans gets ridiculed after unsuccessfully seducing a woman. As they leave, Eef sees a gay man and decides to beat him up with the help of Hans and Rien. The six head to an abandoned building where Hans and Annette do nothing, Truus and Eef fake orgasm noises due to Eef's temporary impotence, and Rien and Maya have sex.

A few days pass and Rien, hailed as a hometown hero, enters a motocross race with Hans. There, a local biker gang member begins to act like a jerk towards the new food truck and its French fry slinger, Fientje. Jaap, Fientje's brother, stands up to the biker, who proceeds to leave. Rien, Hans, and Eef all see Fientje and instantly become attracted to her. When Rien has an argument with Maya, he ends up having a tryst with Fientje. However, when Hans and Rien go for a leisurely ride one day, the driver of a nearby car tosses a bag of oranges out of the window. The bag hits Rien, who loses control and goes off the road, hitting his back on a stump, paralyzing him from the waist down.

Fientje sees a now disabled Rien and realizes that since his career is over, she has no use for him. Despite going through physical therapy, Rien ends up heartbroken and depressed. Even his return home to the locals welcoming home doesn't seem to help. Meanwhile, Fientje attempts to seduce Eef, but to no avail. Eef's habit of following gay men, watching them, and then beating them up catches up to him one night when Jaap and a group of men sexually assault him in an abandoned train station. Jaap apologizes but tells Eef he should be able to come to terms with the truth. Eef ends up having a relationship with Jaap and comes out to his religious father, resulting in his disownment.

Fientje and Hans have sex in the back of the food truck one day and she realizes Hans could be her ticket to start a new life. When Hans has a chance to ride with Gerrit Witkamp, he gets too confident and begins to make blunders. This leads to Witkamp and TV reporter Franz Henkhof to make a video just of Hans' errors as a racer. The video is shown that night at the bar run by Rien's father. Meanwhile, Rien, totally depressed, decides to roll towards the highway and stops in front of a moving truck, which fatally hits him. Hans' embarrassing video leads to an all-out brawl that results in the bar being completely destroyed. As the police investigate the brawl, Rien's father gets the devastating news of his son and is heartbroken.

Hans and Fientje go to the destroyed bar a few days later and Hans tells Fientje that with money he had saved up, Rien's father has sold him the bar. Hans has the idea to create a new local bar and restaurant. Fientje accepts and ends up in a relationship with Hans. Jaap decides to leave town and offers Eef a chance to go with him. Eef sees his father, who is still ignoring him, and politely decline Jaap's offer with the hopes to reconcile with his dad someday. As Jaap sees Fientje and Hans work on their new business, he gives his sister the "thumbs up". As Jaap heads towards the highway, Maya is seen heading to a bus to go to work.

== Cast ==
- Hans van Tongeren as Rien
- Renée Soutendijk as Fientje
- Toon Agterberg as Eef
- Maarten Spanjer as Hans
- Marianne Boyer as Maya
- Peter Tuinman as Jaap
- Saskia van Basten-Batenburg (credited as Saskia Ten Batenburg) as Truus
- Yvonne Valkenburg as Annette
- Ab Abspoel (credited as Albert Abspoel) as Rien's Father
- Rudi Falkenhagen as Hans' Father
- Hans Veerman as Eef's Father
- Ben Aerden as Elderly Homosexual
- Kitty Courbois as Doctor
- Margot Keune as Girl On Moped
- Jonna Koster as Gerrit's Wife
- Gees Linnebank as Homosexual
- Hugo Metsers as a Hell's Angel
- Peter Oosthoek as Priest
- Jeroen Krabbé as Frans Henkhof
- Rutger Hauer as Gerrit Witkamp
- Bruni Heinke as Mother In Car
- Herman Vinck as Driver

== Background ==
The film led to protests about how Verhoeven portrayed gays, Christians, the police, and the press. Although Verhoeven made one more film in the Netherlands, the response to Spetters led him to leave for Hollywood. Despite the large amount of controversy surrounding it, the film proved to be popular, with 1,124,162 admissions in the Netherlands alone. The town of Maassluis was the setting for the movie.

== Reception ==
On the review aggregator website Rotten Tomatoes, 86% of 14 critics' reviews are positive, with an average rating of 6.7/10. Anton Bitel from Little White Lies wrote that "in these young men's stories, as they become caught up in a collision of older and newer values, you can also see the painful emergence of the Dutch nation from its own Calvinist, homophobic, colonialist past."

Nicholas Royle of Time Out opined you should "imagine a Mike Leigh film set in Holland with motorbike stunts, packed with authentic action sequences and sexual frankness, including an eye-popping cock-measuring contest." Film critic Vincent Canby commented that "Verhoeven attempts to jazz things up with a number of soft-core pornographic sequences, which make the movie look even more old-fashioned; all of the performers stand head and shoulders above the material."

Critic Michael Bronski stated "for all of its outspokenness and sexual frankness Spetters is a nice movie about three boys growing up; the middle class disenchantment that we have grown used to in Hollywood films is totally absent here; except for the gay boy whose father is a religious fanatic, all the young people and their parents seem to get along fine." The Stranger wrote "the film never condones the antics but condemns the sort of masculinity and conservatism fomented in Dutch culture; still, it's tough and shocking."

== Home media ==
The film was released on DVD and Blu-ray by Lumiere Home Entertainment on 8 May 2012.

== See also ==
- Cinema of the Netherlands
- List of Dutch actors
- List of Dutch films of the 1980s
- List of LGBTQ-related films of 1980
