= Tropic of Emerald =

De gordel van smaragd
- Theatrical release poster
- Directed by: Orlow Seunke
- Written by: Mijke de Jong, Orlow Seunke
- Distributed by: PolyGram Filmed Entertainment
- Release date: 2 October 1997
- Running time: 120 minutes
- Country: Netherlands
- Language: Dutch

Tropic of Emerald or De gordel van smaragd is a 1997 Dutch drama film directed by Orlow Seunke.

== Plot ==
From Amsterdam, Netherlands, Theo Staats came to Soekamadjoe near Depok, Dutch East Indies in 1925 to help his Oom on his Oom's rubber plantation in several plots of land. Theo was guided by an Indo mandeur (plantation field manager) named Boon. Theo met Ems, an Indo cafe singer in Soekamadjoe. Ems was Dr. Herman's wife. Theo was involved in illicit love and infidelity with Ems. But Ems could not leave Herman due to her respect to his husband. Yet, the war broke out in Europe 1939. All Dutch citizens anywhere must take military service, including Dutch East Indies which Japan was the biggest threat in Asia-Pacific. During Asia-Pacific theatre, the Dutch East Indies fell into Japanese army in 1942. Herman was killed by the Japanese and Theo was taken to a concentration camp and his Oom's rubber plantation was taken over by the Japanese. Ems attempted to help Theo and asked for the Japanese commandant to give Theo a special protection, but the Japanese commandant promised to release Theo only if Ems let her body to satisfy the commandant's sexual appetite. The war was end when Japan declared surrender unconditionally on 15 August 1945. All Dutch captives raised the Dutch flag in camp and thought their misery finally ended. But the national extremists pro independence of Indonesia called Barisan Pelopor held sweeping which was allegedly a Dutch accomplice. The Pelopor snatched and killed the Dutch and Indo civilians by using sharpened bamboo, ax, machete, and booty firearms from Japanese in everywhere. The Dutch houses and plantations were damaged by Pelopor (some were taken over), as well as some infrastructure buildings and also the camp. Theo and Ems moved around hiding from the Pelopor's brutal anger. This massive chaos was well known as Bersiap (Masa Bersiap / Bersiap-tijd). Theo's Oom and Boon came back to their rubber plantation but the people already took over the place. Oom was killed by people. There were no safe places for Theo and Ems during Bersiap. In 1949, the Netherlands acknowledged Indonesian sovereignty. In order to recovery the situation, both governments gave opportunity for the Dutch and Indo civilians in Indonesia to choose citizenship, a Dutch or an Indonesian. Once they choose, they were never allowed to visit the country one another. Many of Indos chose the Dutch citizenship because they could not feel safe in Indonesia. So this means the Indos had to leave their motherland (Indonesia) to the fatherland (the Netherlands). Theo chose Dutch citizenship, but Ems chose Indonesian citizenship. Theo came home to the Netherlands and left his love Ems in Indonesia.

== Cast ==
- Pierre Bokma ... Theo Staats
- Esmée de la Bretonière ... Ems
- Christine Hakim ... Soeti
- Bram van der Vlugt ... Herman
- Frans Tumbuan ... Boon
- José Rizal Manua ... Amat
- Piet Kamerman ... Oom
- Hiromi Tojo ... Japanese Officer
- Tio Djarot ... Tjipto
- Elske Falkena ... Marijke
- Ivan F. Aldino ... Ondervrager
- H.I.M. Damsyik ... Kleermaker
- Jajang Pamontjak ... Naaister
