= Hans van Tongeren =

Dutch actor (1955–1982)

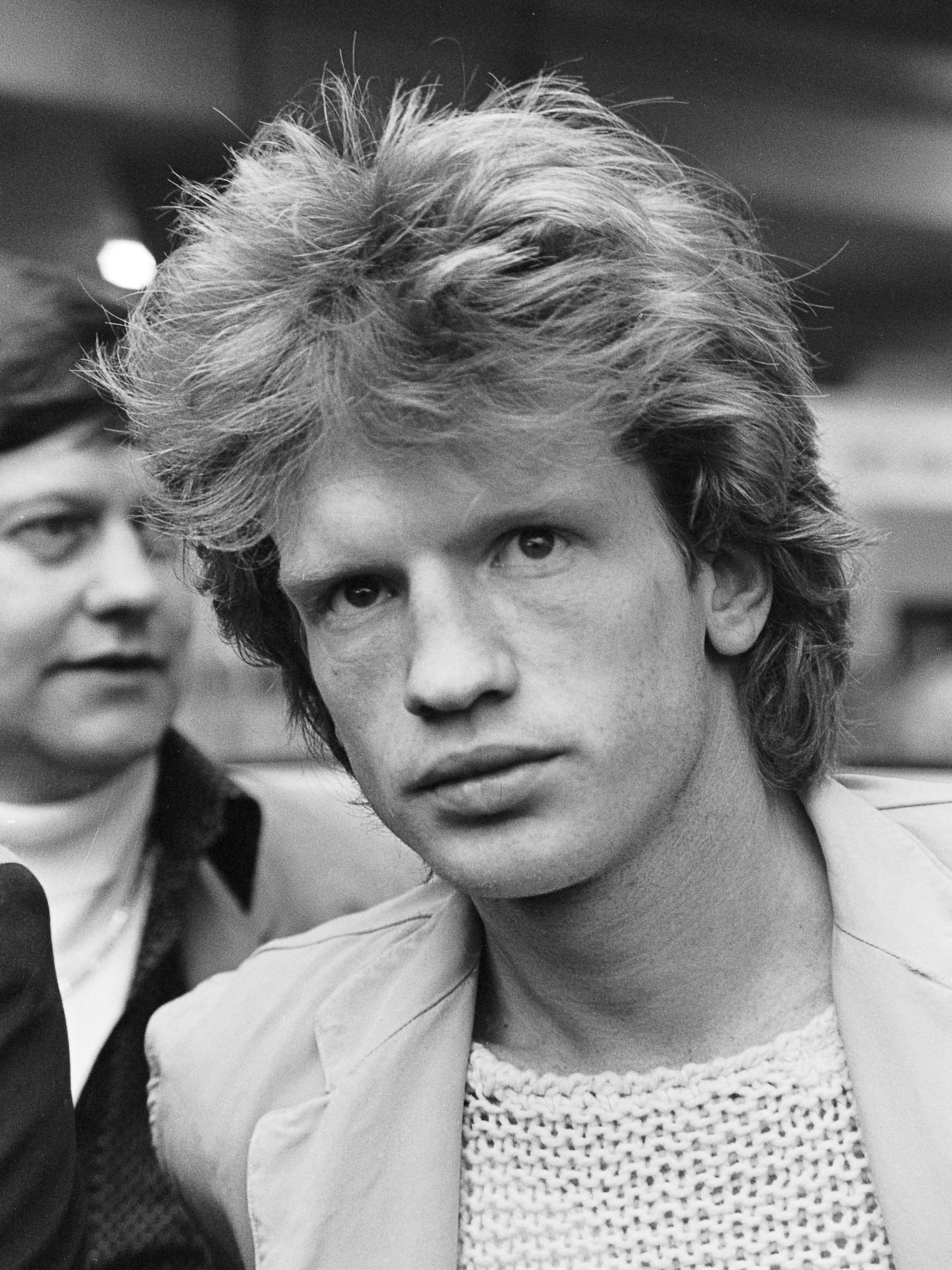
Van Tongeren in 1980

Johannes Adrianus Maria (Hans) van Tongeren (18 January 1955, Breda – 25 August 1982, Amsterdam) was a Dutch actor, who made his debut in the 1980 Paul Verhoeven film Spetters.

== Career ==
Van Tongeren was born in Breda and was recommended to Joop van den Ende for the role of "Rien" in Spetters by casting-director Hans Kemna. The character Rien is a talented motocrosser who is paralyzed in an accident and dies by suicide. Spetters was a very successful film and van Tongeren was cast afterwards for several Dutch films.

In 1982, Van Tongeren played a minor role opposite Peter Gallagher and Daryl Hannah in the American film Summer Lovers. Van Tongeren had been admitted to mental hospitals several times; according to the Dutch media he identified too much with his roles. On 25 August 1982, he died by suicide at age 27, just after having been cast in a Nouchka van Brakel film version of the novel Van de koele meren des doods by Frederik van Eeden, in which he would again have played a person planning to die by suicide.

== Filmography ==
Year	Title	Role	Notes
1980	Spetters	Rien	
1981	Pim	Assistant	TV series
1982	Het Oponthoud	Lex	TV film
1982	Summer Lovers	Jan Tolin	
1982	The Hes Case	Intern	Final film role
