= 1986 National Society of Film Critics Awards =

Annual US film awards ceremony

21st NSFC Awards

January 5, 1987

Best Film:
Blue Velvet

The 21st National Society of Film Critics Awards, given on 5 January 1987, honored the best filmmaking of 1986.

== Winners ==
=== Best Picture ===
1. Blue Velvet
2. Hannah and Her Sisters
3. Platoon

=== Best Director ===
1. David Lynch – Blue Velvet
2. Andrei Tarkovsky – The Sacrifice (Offret)
3. Oliver Stone – Platoon and Salvador

=== Best Actor ===
1. Bob Hoskins – Mona Lisa
2. Jeff Goldblum – The Fly
3. Paul Newman – The Color of Money

=== Best Actress ===
1. Chloe Webb – Sid and Nancy
2. Sandrine Bonnaire – Vagabond (Sans toit ni loi)
2. Kathleen Turner – Peggy Sue Got Married

=== Best Supporting Actor ===
1. Dennis Hopper – Blue Velvet
2. Daniel Day-Lewis – My Beautiful Laundrette and A Room with a View
3. Ray Liotta – Something Wild

=== Best Supporting Actress ===
1. Dianne Wiest – Hannah and Her Sisters
2. Barbara Hershey – Hannah and Her Sisters

=== Best Screenplay ===
1. Hanif Kureishi – My Beautiful Laundrette
2. Woody Allen – Hannah and Her Sisters

=== Best Cinematography ===
1. Frederick Elmes – Blue Velvet
2. Robby Müller – Down by Law
3. Donald McAlpine – Down and Out in Beverly Hills

=== Best Documentary ===
1. Marlene
2. Sherman's March
3. Partisans of Vilna
