= Ponti sul Mincio =

- Comune
- Comune di Ponti sul Mincio
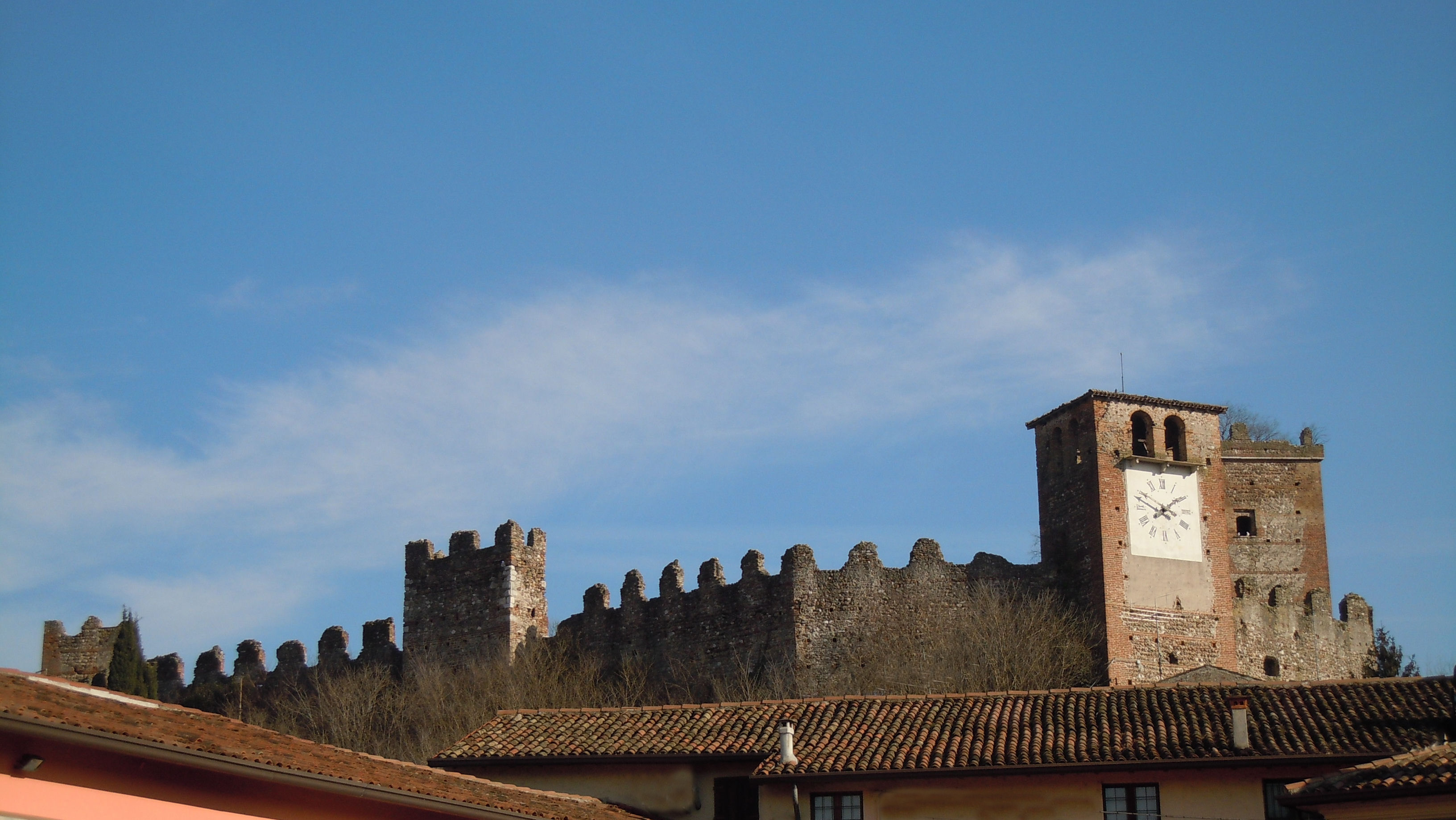
- The Scaliger castle

- Location within Italy Location within Lombardy
- Coordinates: 45°23′N 10°42′E
- Country: Italy
- Region: Lombardy
- Province: Province of Mantua (MN)

Area
  - Total: 11.8 km^{2} (4.6 sq mi)

Population (Dec. 2004)
  - Total: 2,037
  - Density: 173/km^{2} (447/sq mi)
- Time zone: UTC+1 (CET)
  - Summer (DST): UTC+2 (CEST)
- Postal code: 46040
- Dialing code: 0376
- Website: Official website

Ponti sul Mincio (English: Bridges upon Mincio) is a comune (municipality) in the Province of Mantua in the Italian region Lombardy, located about 120 kilometres (75 mi) east of Milan and about 25 kilometres (16 mi) northwest of Mantua. As of 31 December 2004, it had a population of 2,037 and an area of 11.8 square kilometres (4.6 mi^{2}).

Ponti sul Mincio borders the following municipalities: Monzambano, Peschiera del Garda, Pozzolengo, and Valeggio sul Mincio.

== Demographic evolution ==
Historical population

Year	Pop.	±%
1861	?	—
1871	1,210	—
1881	1,282	+6.0%
1901	1,290	+0.6%
1911	1,503	+16.5%

Year	Pop.	±%
1921	1,607	+6.9%
1931	1,597	−0.6%
1936	1,558	−2.4%
1951	1,677	+7.6%
1961	1,426	−15.0%

Year	Pop.	±%
1971	1,480	+3.8%
1981	1,694	+14.5%
1991	1,736	+2.5%
2001	1,912	+10.1%

Source: Data from ISTAT
