= Maarten Spanjer =

Dutch film and television actor (1952–2026)

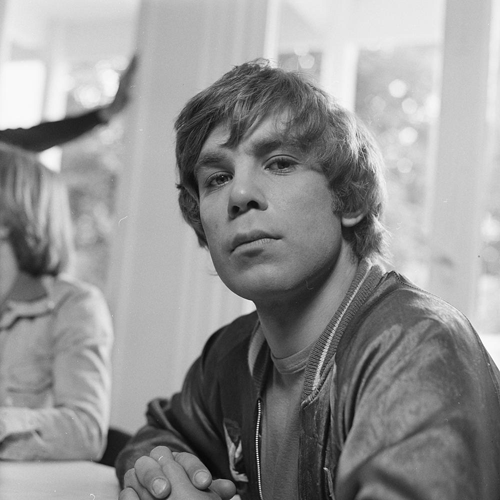
- Spanjer in 1977
- Born: Martinus Raphael Spanjer; 24 October 1952; Amsterdam, Netherlands
- Died: 17 October 2026 (aged 73); Ouderkerk aan de Amstel, Netherlands
- Occupations: Film and television actor

Martinus Raphael Spanjer (24 October 1952 – 17 October 2026) was a Dutch film and television actor. He appeared in over 30 films and television programs between 1975 and 2014, and was best known for playing Hans in the 1980 film Spetters.

Spanjer died in Ouderkerk aan de Amstel on 17 October 2026, at the age of 73.
