= Rudolf Vatinyan =

American cinematographer (1941–2021)

- Born: May 12, 1941; Dilijan, Armenia
- Died: 2 January 2021 (aged 79); Yerevan, Armenia
- Citizenship: Armenia
- Years active: 1970 – 2009

Rudolf Vatinyan (Armenian: Ռուդոլֆ Վաթինյան) (12 May 1941 – 2 January 2021) was an Armenian cinematographer.

He was born in Dilijan, Armenia. In 1969, he graduated from the Gerasimov Institute of Cinematography (VGIK) (B.Volchek's master-class). He worked at Armenfilm studio from 1970 until his death, and had been lecturing in the Department of Culture of Yerevan State Pedagogical Institute since 1980, and since 1994 in the Institute of Cinema and Theatre.

== Filmography ==
- 2009 – Border
- 2000 – A Merry Bas
- 1999 – New Adventures of Kind Ghosts (animation)
- 1997 – Presence (documentary)
- 1996-97 – God Have Mercy
- 1995 – Where Are You Going? (documentary)
- 1995 – Parajanov. The Last Collage (documentary)
- 1993 – Finish
- 1993 – Bust (short)
- 1991 – Hostages
- 1988 – Breath
- 1986 – As Long as We Live…
- 1985 – Where are You Going, Soldier?
- 1985 – Passport of Immortality (documentary)
- 1985 – The Tango of Our Childhood
- 1983 – Fire Sparkling in the Night
- 1982 – Song of the Old Days
- 1982 – A Happening in July (short)
- 1981 – Business Trip to Sanatorium
- 1980 – Automobile on the Roof
- 1979 – Die on the Horse
- 1978 – Five More Days
- 1977 – Cooks Arrived for Competition
- 1976 – August
- 1975 – This Green, Red World
- 1975 – Ginger Plane
- 1974 – Yellow Tonir (short)
- 1973 – Ceaseless Colors (documentary)
- 1972 – From Two to Eight (documentary)
- 1972 – Armenian Murals
- 1970 – Photography (short)
