= Galya Novents =

- Born: Galina Novents; 1 July 1937; Yerevan, Soviet Armenia
- Died: 22 July 2012 (aged 75); Los Angeles, California, U.S.
- Resting place: Yerevan City Pantheon
- Education: Yerevan State Fine Arts and Theater Institute
- Years active: 1965–2012
- Spouse: Yervand Ghazanchyan
- Awards: People's Artist of the Republic of Armenia (2007)

Galya Novents (Armenian: Գալյա Նովենց; 1 July 1937 – 22 July 2012) was a Soviet and Armenian stage and film actress, one of the most prominent Armenian actresses of the 20th century.

== Biography ==
Galya Novents was born on 1 July 1937 in Yerevan. In 1958, she graduated from Yerevan Institute of Fine Arts and Theatre.

The 42nd Venice International Film Festival gave her a special mention for Best Actress for role in The Tango of Our Childhood, which was not awarded.

In 2007, Novents was awarded the title of People's Artist of the Republic of Armenia.

She died on 22 July 2012 in Los Angeles at the age of seventy-five.

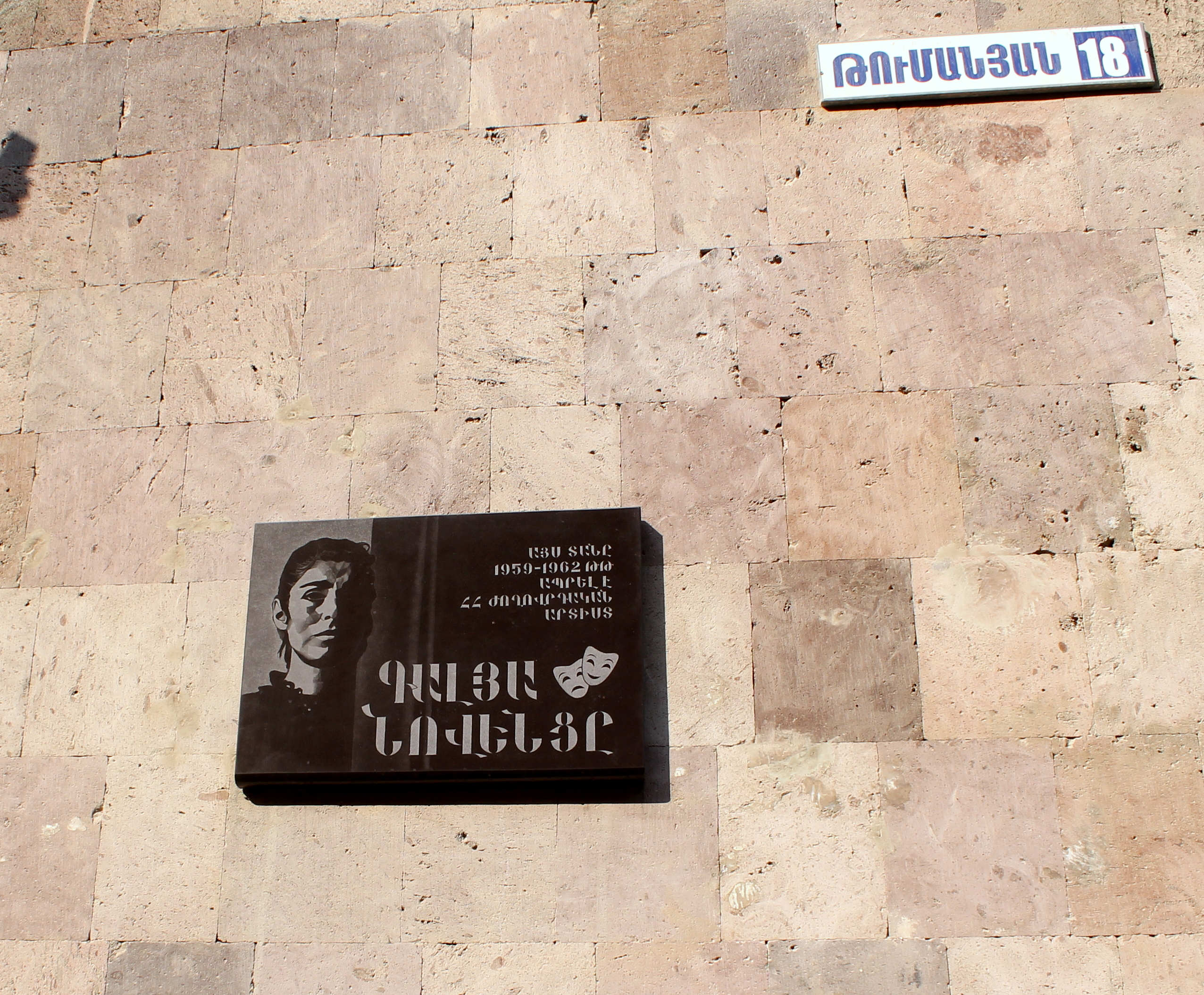
Plaque to Galya Novents in Kapan

== Filmography ==
- 2001 Khent hreshtak
- 1992 Klamek ji bo Beko (as Galina Novenz)
- 1992 Where Have You Been, Man of God? (TV Mini-Series)
- 1991 Blood
- 1990 Yearning
- 1989 Breath
- 1988 Tchanaparh depi Sasuntsi Davit
- 1985 Apple Garden
- 1985 White Dreams
- 1985 The Tango of Our Childhood
- 1983 Cry of a Peacock
- 1982 Gikor
- 1982 The Song of the Old Days
- 1980 A Piece of Sky
- 1977 Nahapet
- 1975 Here, on This Crossroads
- 1974 Sour Grape
- 1971 Heghnar aghbyur
- 1969 We and Our Mountains
- 1966 Barev, yes em
