= Vagabond (1985 film) =

1985 French film

- Theatrical release poster
- Directed by: Agnès Varda
- Written by: Agnès Varda
- Produced by: Oury Milshtein
- Starring: Sandrine Bonnaire; Macha Méril; Stéphane Freiss; Yolande Moreau
- Cinematography: Patrick Blossier
- Edited by: Agnès Varda; Patricia Mazuy
- Music by: Joanna Bruzdowicz
- Distributed by: MK2 Diffusion
- Release dates: September 1985 (Venice); 4 December 1985
- Running time: 105 minutes
- Country: France
- Language: French
- Box office: $8.1 million

Vagabond (French: Sans toit ni loi, literally "without roof or law") is a 1985 French drama film written and directed by Agnès Varda and starring Sandrine Bonnaire. Beginning with the discovery of a young female vagabond in a ditch, the film tells—via flashbacks—the story of her last winter, which she spent wandering around the Languedoc-Roussillon wine country.

The film premiered at the 42nd Venice International Film Festival, where it won the Golden Lion, and was nominated for four César Awards, with Bonnaire winning Best Actress. It was the 36th highest-grossing film of the year in France, with a total of 1,080,143 admissions. The film has been met with critical acclaim and was featured in the 2022 Sight and Sound director and critics' polls of the greatest films of all time.

== Plot ==
On a cold winter morning in the vineyards of a small village in the Gard region of France, the contorted body of a young woman, Mona Bergeron, is discovered in a ditch. The local gendarmes quickly determine she is a vagrant who froze to death, and she is buried in a potter's field.

Mona's last winter is revealed through flashbacks framed by interviews with those who crossed paths with her. She wanders the country alone, hitchhiking, sleeping in a tent, and doing odd jobs to survive. She endures hunger, thirst, cold, and a scarcity of tobacco and cannabis. On her journey, Mona meets a housekeeper, a family of goat farmers, a professor specialising in plane trees, a Tunisian vineyard worker, and a group of homeless youths who spend their time drinking, doing drugs, and committing petty crimes at a railway station. She tells one companion that she left her life as a secretary in Paris to seek freedom and life without responsibility.

Mona's boots fall apart, and after she loses her tent and sleeping bag in a fire at a squat in Nîmes, she is left with only a blanket for warmth. She stumbles across a bizarre harvest festival, where she is daubed with wine dregs by men in strange costumes. After escaping, she wanders into a vineyard, where she falls into a ditch. Tired, cold, wet, and now injured, she does not get up, and succumbs to the elements.

== Cast ==
- Sandrine Bonnaire as Mona Bergeron
- Macha Méril as Madame Landier, a plane tree specialist
- Stéphane Freiss as Jean-Pierre, an agronomist
- Yolande Moreau as Yolande, Lydie's maid
- Patrick Lepcynski as David, "the wandering Jew"
- Yahiaoui Assouna as Assoun, a vine pruner
- Joël Fosse as Paulo, Yolande's boyfriend
- Marthe Jarnias as Lydie, Jean-Pierre's aunt
- Laurence Cortadellas as Eliane, Jean-Pierre's wife
- Patrick Schmit as the truck driver
- Daniel Bos as the demolition worker
- Katy Champaud as the girl at the water pump
- Pierre Imbert as the mechanic
- Richard Imbert as the mechanic's son
- Gabriel Mariani as Aimé Bionnet, Yolande's uncle
- Sylvain and Sabine as the goat farmers
- Emmanuel Protopopoff as the backpacker blood donor
- "Garibaldi" Fernández as the mason with the round hat
- Aimée Chisci as the manager of Assoun's farm
- Christian Chessa as Mac, a homeless youth at the train station
- Setina Arhab as a homeless youth at the train station
- Jacques Berthier as the well-dressed little man at the train station
- Bébert Samcir as the harmonica player

== Title ==
The film's original French title, Sans toit ni loi ("without roof or law"), is word play based on a common French idiom, "sans foi ni loi" ("with neither faith nor law"). It also a pun on sans toi ("without you").

== Style ==
Vagabond combines straightforward narrative scenes, in which we see Mona living her life, with pseudo-documentary sequences in which people who knew Mona turn to the camera and say what they remember about her. Significant events are sometimes left unshown, so that the viewer must piece information together to gain the full picture. It was filmed in the departments of Gard, Hérault, and Bouches-du-Rhône.

== Critical reception ==
On the review aggregator website Rotten Tomatoes, Vagabond has a 100% approval rating based on 26 reviews, with an average rating of 9.1/10.

Roger Ebert gave it four stars out of four, writing: "like so many of the greatest films, it tells us a very specific story, strong and unadorned, about a very particular person".

Peter Bradshaw gave the film a full five stars, writing that film was "enigmatic, possessed of a cool artistry in its structural asymmetries and inconsistencies, and as gripping as any thriller."

In the 2022 Sight and Sound critic's poll, Vagabond placed 101st, tying with The House Is Black and Rio Bravo. In the 2022 Sight and Sound director's poll, it placed 41st.

== Awards and nominations ==
Award	Category	Name	Outcome
César Awards	Best Film	Agnès Varda	Nominated
César Awards	Best Director	Agnès Varda	Nominated
César Awards	Best Actress	Sandrine Bonnaire	Won
César Awards	Best Supporting Actress	Macha Méril	Nominated
French Syndicate of Cinema Critics	Best Film	Agnès Varda	Won
Los Angeles Film Critics Association Awards	Best Foreign Film	Agnès Varda	Won
Los Angeles Film Critics Association Awards	Best Actress	Sandrine Bonnaire	Won
National Society of Film Critics Awards	Best Actress	Sandrine Bonnaire	Nominated
New York Film Critics Circle Awards	Best Foreign Language Film	Agnès Varda	Nominated
Sant Jordi Awards	Best Foreign Actress	Sandrine Bonnaire	Won
Venice Film Festival	Golden Lion	Agnès Varda	Won
Venice Film Festival	Volpi Cup for Best Actress	Sandrine Bonnaire	—N/a (Note: This award was not assigned. The jury deemed the best performances to be Sandrine Bonnaire (Sans toit ni loi) and Jane Birkin (Dust), but decided against awarding the prize, as both films won major awards. They also gave a special mention to three other actresses for their performances.)
Venice Film Festival	FIPRESCI Prize	Agnès Varda	Won
Venice Film Festival	OCIC Award	Agnès Varda	Won
