= 1983 Toronto International Film Festival =

Annual Canadian film festival

- Festival poster
- Opening film: The Big Chill
- Location: Toronto, Ontario, Canada
- Hosted by: Toronto International Film Festival Group
- Festival date: September 9, 1983–September 17, 1983
- Language: English
- Website: tiff.net
- 1984 1982

The 8th Toronto International Film Festival (TIFF) took place in Toronto, Ontario, Canada between September 9 and September 17, 1983. This year, the festival introduced Contemporary World Cinema programme. The festival also shone light on Paul Verhoeven's work. The festival also held a retrospective in honor of David Cronenberg, first time for a Toronto-reared director. The censor board insisted that the censored version of Cronenberg's film The Brood, approved in 1979 be used.

The Big Chill by Lawrence Kasdan was selected as the opening film. It won the People's Choice Award at the festival, and later got nominated for Academy Awards, BAFTAs and the Golden Globes.

== Awards ==
Award	Film	Director
People's Choice Award	The Big Chill	Lawrence Kasdan
International Critics' Award	The Fourth Man	Paul Verhoeven

== Programme ==
=== Gala Presentations ===
- The Big Chill by Lawrence Kasdan
- Carmen by Prosper Mérimée
- Educating Rita by Lewis Gilbert
- Entre Nous by Diane Kurys
- Heart Like a Wheel by Jonathan Kaplan
- Merry Christmas, Mr. Lawrence by Nagisa Ōshima
- Moon in the Gutter by Jean-Jacques Beineix
- Streamers by Robert Altman
- The Tin Flute by Claude Fournier
- Vertigo (1983 reissue) by Alfred Hitchcock

=== Contemporary World Cinema ===
- Alsino and the Condor by Miguel Littín
- Angelo My Love by Robert Duvall
- L'Argent by Robert Bresson
- Au clair de la lune by André Forcier
- La Balance by Bob Swaim
- The Ballad of Narayama by Shōhei Imamura
- Bella Donna by Peter Keglevic
- Beyond Forty by Anne Claire Poirier
- Can She Bake a Cherry Pie? by Henry Jaglom
- Danton by Andrzej Wajda
- Le Dernier Combat by Luc Besson
- Deserters by Jack Darcus
- Enormous Changes at the Last Minute by Mirra Bank, Ellen Hovde and Muffie Meyer
- Eréndira by Ruy Guerra
- Experience Preferred... But Not Essential by Peter Duffell
- The Eyes, the Mouth by Marco Bellocchio
- Fists in the Pocket by Marco Bellocchio
- The Fourth Man by Paul Verhoeven
- The Go Masters by Junya Sato and Jishun Duan
- The Leopard by Luchino Visconti
- My Brother's Wedding by Charles Burnett
- The South by Víctor Erice
- The State of Things by Wim Wenders
- Strangers Kiss by Matthew Chapman

=== Documentaries ===
- Comfort and Indifference by Denys Arcand
- Falasha: Exile of the Black Jews by Simcha Jacobovici
- Return Engagement by Alan Rudolph
- The Shimmering Beast by Pierre Perrault
- To the Rhythm of My Heart by Jean Pierre Lefebvre
- We're Not the Jet Set by Robert Duvall

=== David Cronenberg retrospective ===
- Stereo (1969)
- Crimes of the Future (1970)
- Shivers (1975)
- Rabid (1977)
- Fast Company (1979)
- The Brood (1979)
- Scanners (1981)
- Videodrome (1983)
