= The Good Soldier (1982 film) =

1982 drama film

- Directed by: Franco Brusati
- Screenplay by: Franco Brusati; Ennio De Concini
- Produced by: Mario Gallo
- Starring: Mariangela Melato
- Cinematography: Romano Albani
- Edited by: Roberto Perpignani
- Music by: Maurizio Fabrizio
- Release date: 1982
- Language: Italian

The Good Soldier (Italian: Il buon soldato, French: Le Bon Soldat) is a 1982 Italian-French romantic drama film co-written and directed by Franco Brusati. It premiered at the 39th edition of the Venice Film Festival.

== Cast ==
- Mariangela Melato as Marta
- Gérard Darier as Tommaso
- Giampaolo De Angelis as Tommasino
- Bruno Zanin as Marco
- Carla Bizzarri as Aunt Adele
- Toni Barpi as Uncle Pietro
- Jean-François Balmer as the Lawyer
- Gérard Lartigau as Luca
- Siria Betti as Marta's Mother
- Carlo Monni as Giovanotto Torretta
- Clara Colosimo as Friend
- Diana Dei as Friend

== Production ==
Brusati drew inspiration for the script from a true story that occurred in Livorno.

== Release ==
The film had its world premiere at the 39th Venice International Film Festival, in the main competition section. Following its mixed reception, Brusati assembled a new, shorter cut of the film, which was released in Italian cinemas in February 1983.

== Reception ==
Corriere della Sera's film critic Giovanni Grazzini noted that while the Venice cut was marred by "the continuous oscillation between realism and surrealism [...] where images and voices were often way over-the-top", the new theatrical version "by cutting out some of the unpleasantness and giving the whole more compactness, [...] remedies to a good extent the failures of the screenplay".

Paolo Mereghetti noted that even with the new cut the film remains "indefensible", characterized by "subtle conformism", "over-the-top grotesqueness", and a "discordant poetic tone".
