= 1982 Toronto International Film Festival =

Annual Canadian film festival

- Festival poster
- Location: Toronto, Ontario, Canada
- Hosted by: Toronto International Film Festival Group
- Festival date: September 9, 1982–September 18, 1982
- Language: English
- Website: tiff.net
- 1983 1981

The 7th Toronto International Film Festival (TIFF) took place in Toronto, Ontario, Canada between September 9 and September 18, 1982. The festival paid tribute to Martin Scorsese, who attended along with Robert De Niro, Robert Duvall and Harvey Keitel. Scorsese also participated in Q&A at the festival, with Roger Ebert and Gene Siskel.

Atom Egoyan and Bruce McDonald screened their short films Open House and Let Me See respectively outside University theatre, which was the main theatre of the festival, after their films were rejected from 1982 festival.

The film The Executioner's Song had been slated to premiere at the festival, but had to be pulled due to an unresolved dispute between the film's producers and the Screen Actors Guild. The festival was also unable to secure screenings of the high-profile Canadian films The Grey Fox and The Wars, with the producers of both films asserting that in the unstable economic climate of the time, festival premieres would damage their prospects for securing commercial distribution.

== Awards ==
Award	Film	Director
People's Choice	Tempest	Paul Mazursky
CFTO International Critics' Award	Veronika Voss	Rainer Werner Fassbinder
CFTO International Critics' Award	The Hes Case	Orlow Seunke

== Programme ==
=== Gala Presentation ===
- Angel by Neil Jordan
- Bad Blood by Mike Newell
- Hammett by Wim Wenders
- The Hes Case by Orlow Seunke
- Identification of a Woman by Michelangelo Antonioni
- Moonlighting by Jerzy Skolimowski
- Pinkel by Dick Rijneke
- A Question of Silence by Marleen Gorris
- Starstruck by Gillian Armstrong
- Sweet Lies and Loving Oaths (Doux aveux) by Fernand Dansereau
- Tempest by Paul Mazursky
- Toute une nuit by Chantal Akerman
- Veronika Voss by Rainer Werner Fassbinder
- We of the Never Never by Igor Auzins

=== Canadian cinema ===
- Big Meat Eater by Chris Windsor
- Hank Williams: The Show He Never Gave by David Acomba
- Scissere by Peter Mettler
- Wild Flowers by Jean Pierre Lefebvre
