= The Hes Case =

1982 film by Orlow Seunke

- Directed by: Orlow Seunke
- Written by: Orlow Seunke; Dirk Ayelt Kooiman
- Starring: Gerard Thoolen
- Cinematography: Albert van der Wildt
- Music by: Maarten Koopman
- Release date: 1982
- Country: Netherlands

The Hes Case (Dutch: De smaak van water, also known as The Taste of Water) is a 1982 Dutch drama film written and directed by Orlow Seunke, at his feature film debut.

The film premiered at the 39th edition of the Venice Film Festival in which it won the Silver Lion for Best First Work, and which later was the recipient of several other accolades including the International Critics' Award at the Toronto Film Festival and the Bronze Hugo Award at the Chicago International Film Festival. The film is loosely based on the novel The Case Worker (a.k.a. The Visitor) by György Konrád; originally intended as a faithful adaptation of the novel, during the four years of scriptwriting process the screenplay underwent various changes, notably going to include some Seunke's autobiographical events.

== Cast ==
- Gerard Thoolen - Hes
- Dorijn Curvers - Anna
- Joop Admiraal - Schram
- Hans van Tongeren - Intern
- Olga Zuiderhoek - Hes' wife
- Moniek Toebosch - Prostitute
- Standa Bares - Neighbour
- René Groothof - Man in café
- Ab Abspoel - Doorman
- Bram van der Vlugt - Furnishing director
- Peer Mascini - Supervisor
