= The Tango of Our Childhood =

1984 Soviet-Armenian tragicomedy

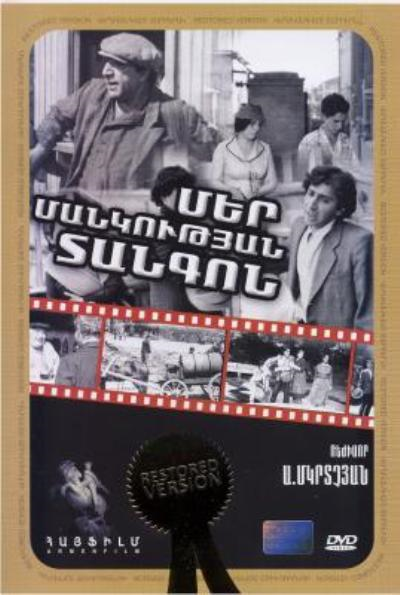
- Մեր մանկության տանգոն
- Directed by: Albert Mkrtchyan
- Written by: Albert Mkrtchyan
- Starring: Frunzik Mkrtchyan; Galya Novents
- Cinematography: Rudolf Vatinyan
- Music by: Tigran Mansuryan
- Distributed by: Armenfilm
- Release date: October 1984
- Running time: 89 min
- Country: Soviet Union
- Languages: Armenian; Russian

The Tango of Our Childhood (Armenian: Մեր մանկության տանգոն, Russian: Танго нашего детства) is a 1984 Soviet-Armenian tragicomedy film written and directed by Albert Mkrtchyan and starring Frunzik Mkrtchyan (his brother) and Galya Novents. Novents' performance as a mother who struggles to raise her children during post-World War II Armenia was awarded Special Mention at the Venice Film Festival. Mkrtchyan dedicated the autobiographical story to his hometown of Gyumri. The filming locations highlighted the historic buildings of Gyumri which were marked for preservation as the Kumayri Reserve in 1980. The New York Times described Novents' performance as that of "a kind of Anna Magnani earth mother who acts at the top of her lungs."

== Plot ==
The film is set in Leninakan (now Gyumri) in the aftermath of World War II. Novents portrays a wife whose husband has left her and their three children for his wife's best friend.

== Cast ==
- Galya Novents as Siranush
- Frunzik Mkrtchyan as Ruben
- Elina Agamyan as Vardush
- Azat Gasparyan as Mesrop
- Narine Bagdasaryan as Ruzan
- Samvel Sarkisyan as Armen
- Ashot Gevorkyan as Gagik
- Artashes Nalbandyan as Ashot
- Artashes Gedikyan as Serob
- Margarita Karapetyan as Arpenik
- Nona Petrosyan as Knar
- Ruben Mkrtchyan as Yeghish
- V. Movsisyan as Svasyan
- Aleksandr Oganesyan as Zarzand
- Vrezh Hakobyan as Melkonyan
- Kadzhik Barsegyan as investigator
