= Boro Drašković =

Serbian performing arts professional

- Боро Драшковић
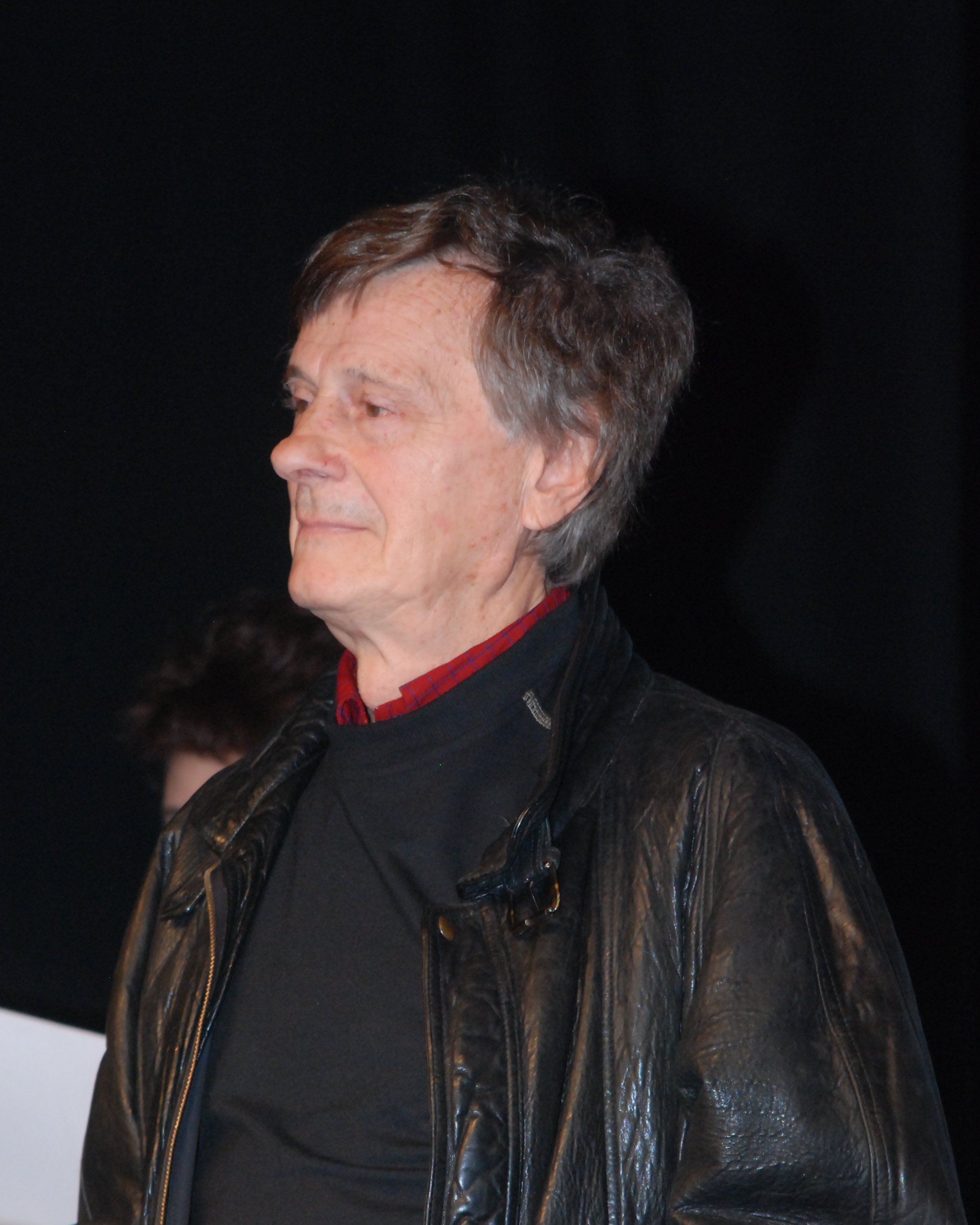
- Drašković in 2011
- Born: 29 May 1935 (age 91); Sarajevo, Kingdom of Yugoslavia
- Occupations: Director, playwright, screenwriter

Boro Drašković (Serbian Cyrillic: Боро Драшковић; born 29 May 1935) is a Serbian director, playwright and screenwriter.

== Biography ==
Boro Drašković graduated from Belgrade's Academy of Theater, Film, Radio, and Television in 1959. He entered the film industry as an assistant to Polish director Andrzej Wajda in 1962 and afterwards became an assistant to Jerzy Kawalerowicz. Drašković sold his first screenplay in 1964. Horoskop (Horoscope), released in 1969, was Drašković's first feature film. Three more feature films followed, which he also co-scripted. Drašković has directed documentaries and worked in television and radio; he has also written several books on cinema and theater.

He received a doctorate honoris causa from the École supérieure de réalisation audiovisuelle in 2010.

== Filmography ==
=== Television ===
Table featuring television directed by Boro Drašković
Year	Title	Director	Writer	Notes	Ref.
1968	Prljave ruke	No	Yes	TV movie	
1973	Paradoks o sahu	Yes	Yes	TV documentary	
1973	Intervju sa Laxnessom	Yes	Yes	TV documentary	
1973	Nedeljno popodne na Grenlandu	Yes	Yes	TV documentary	
1973	Pohvala Islandu	Yes	Yes	TV documentary	
1973	Intervju sa predsednikom Islanda	Yes	Yes	TV documentary	
1973	Peta kolona	Yes	No	TV movie	
1974	Obesenjak	Yes	No	TV movie	
1976	Kuhinja	Yes	Yes	TV movie	
1976	Poslednje nazdravlje	No	Yes	TV movie; adaptation	
1976	Murtalov slucaj	No	Yes	TV movie	
1976	Marija	No	Yes	TV movie; adaptation	
1976	Beogradska deca	No	Yes	TV movie	
1976	Andjelov udes	No	Yes	TV movie; adaptation	
1981	Duvanski put	Yes	Yes	TV mini-series	

=== Film ===
Year	Film	Director	Writer	Awards / Notes
1969	Horoskop	Yes	Yes	Honorable Mention: UNICRIT Award at the Berlin International Film Festival
1979	Usijanje	Yes	Yes	Silver Arena Award for Best Film at the Pula Film Festival
1985	Life Is Beautiful	Yes	Yes	Nominated for Golden Lion Award at the Venice Film Festival
1994	Vukovar, jedna priča	Yes	Yes	Four awards

== Awards and nominations ==
Year	Award	Category	Work	Result	Ref.
1969	Berlin International Film Festival	Honorable Mention: UNICRIT Award	Horoskop	Won	
1979	Pula Film Festival	Silver Arena Award for Best Film	Usijanje	Won	
1985	Venice Film Festival	Golden Lion	Life Is Beautiful	Nominated	
1995	Vukovar, jedna priča	Jerusalem Film Festival	Mediterranean Film Prize for Peace and Tolerance	Won	
1995	Vukovar, jedna priča	Karlovy Vary International Film Festival	Crystal Globe	Nominated	
1995	Vukovar, jedna priča	St. Louis International Film Festival	Best First Feature Award	Won	
1995	Vukovar, jedna priča	Taos Talking Pictures Film Festival	Cineaste Award	Won	
1996	Vukovar, jedna priča	Tromsø International Film Festival	Import Award	Won	
2010	International Film Festival ASTERFEST	TFA Honorary Award	High achievements in film, TV and dramatic arts	Won	

== Books ==
- Promena (Change), 1975.
- Ogledalo (Mirror), Svjelost, Sarajevo, 1985.
- Lavirint (Labyrinth), Sterijino pozorje, Novi Sad, 1980.
- Paradoks o reditelju (The Paradox of the Director), Sterijino pozorje, Novi Sad, 1988.
- Kralj majmuna (Monkey King), Prometheus – Novi Sad, 1996.
- Pogled Prolaznika (A View of Passers), Prometheus – Novi Sad, 2006, ISBN 86-515-0019-X
- Ravnoteža (Balance) Vršac, 2007, ISBN 978-86-7497-128-4
- Fillm o Filmu (A Film about Film), Prometheus – Novi Sad, 2010, ISBN 978-86-515-0551-8
- Krug maslinom (Olive Circle), Novi Sad, Theater Museum of Vojvodina, 2011, ISBN 978-86-85123-55-9
- Drama reditelja (Drama of Director), Vršac, 2011, ISBN 978-86-7497-193-2
- Kamus profesije (Dictionary of the Profession), Knjaževsko-srpski teatar, Kragujevac, 2012, ISBN 978-86-909821-7-2

== See also ==
- List of Serbian submissions for the Academy Award for Best Foreign Language Film
- 1997 Toronto International Film Festival
- Big Golden Arena for Best Film
- Statuette of Joakim Vujić
