= Blue Planet (1982 film) =

1982 documentary film

- Directed by: Franco Piavoli
- Screenplay by: Franco Piavoli; Neria Poli
- Produced by: Silvano Agosti
- Cinematography: Franco Piavoli
- Edited by: Giuliana Zamariola
- Release date: 1982
- Language: Italian

Blue Planet (Italian: Il pianeta azzurro) is a 1982 Italian documentary film directed by Franco Piavoli, in his directorial debut.

The film premiered at the 39th edition of the Venice Film Festival.

== Production ==
Piavoli conceived the film in the early 1960s but was unable to secure financing until the late 1970s, when he began shooting with the support of his wife, Neria Poli, and funding provided by a film cooperative, 11 Marzo Cinematografica. The film was shot between Pozzolengo and its valley. Director's goal was "to explore aspects of nature and humankind that are not immediately evident to the naked eye".

== Release ==
The film had its world premiere at the 39th Venice International Film Festival, in the main competition section, where it won the Banca Cattolica del Veneto prize and the AGIS-BNL award. It had its North-American premiere at the 1983 Mill Valley Film Festival.

== Reception ==
Vadim Rizov from The Village Voice described the film as "a one-of-a-kind nature documentary [...] defiantly formalist, nearly avant-garde". Silvia Carlorosi wrote: "Piavoli clears the way to allowing words and objects speaking entirely for themselves as they are now outside of their conventional codification", "What is most important is that viewers abandon themselves to the multiplicity of the images and sounds and their dialogic meaning, which is, in essence, the poetic element that comprises Piavoli's filmmaking. The film plays intensely with polysemy, with the ambiguous richness of signs and meanings in order to give the spectators the chance to venture inside the characters and enrich them with the variables of their own existence. The distinctive poetry of this film depends on making full use of its complex cinematographic language so as to transmit a composite representation of reality". Italian critic Tullio Kezich described the film as "a film of rare poetic quality, [...] that can leave a deep impression on the sympathetic viewer".

For this film Piavoli won the Nastro d'Argento for Best New Director.

On review aggregator website Rotten Tomatoes, the film holds an approval rating of 83% based on 6 reviews, with an average rating of 6.1/10.
