= Tracks in the Snow (1985 film) =

1985 film by Orlow Seunke

- Directed by: Orlow Seunke
- Written by: Orlow Seunke; Dirk Ayelt Kooiman
- Starring: Gerard Thoolen
- Cinematography: Theo Bierkens
- Music by: Maarten Koopman
- Release date: 1985
- Country: Netherlands

Tracks in the Snow (Dutch: Pervola, sporen in de sneeuw, also known as Pervola) is a 1985 Dutch drama film written and directed by Orlow Seunke. It was entered into the main competition at the 42nd Venice International Film Festival and won the Golden Calf Special Jury Prize at the Netherlands Film Festival.

== Cast ==
- Gerard Thoolen as Simon van Oyen
- Bram van der Vlugt as Hein van Oyen
- Melle van Essen as Aapo
- Jan Willem Hees as vader Van Oyen
- Thom Hoffman as Ron
- Jaap Hoogstra as Olga
- Brigitte Kaandorp as Truusje
