= Allemaal tuig! =

- Directed by: Ben Sombogaart
- Release date: 1981
- Running time: 94 minutes
- Country: Netherlands
- Language: Dutch

Allemaal tuig! is a 1981 Dutch television series directed by Ben Sombogaart.

== Plot ==
A gang of youths is arrested by the police on charges of theft and vandalism. They must all wait at home (as a form of house arrest) to be summoned in court. Through a series of flashbacks the viewer gains insight as to how the gang lost its way.

== Cast ==
- Tonny Tedering - Bart
- Floris Andringa - Monne
- Annemarie van Ginkel - Anja
- Pieter Hessel - Wijnand
- Femy Keuben - Shirley
- Ronald Straub - Leen
- Germaine Groenier - television reporter
