= Tempest (1982 film) =

1982 film by Paul Mazursky

- Theatrical release poster
- Directed by: Paul Mazursky
- Screenplay by: Leon Capetanos; Paul Mazursky
- Based on: The Tempest by Wm. Shakespeare
- Produced by: Paul Mazursky; Steven Bernhardt; Pato Guzman
- Starring: John Cassavetes; Gena Rowlands; Susan Sarandon; Vittorio Gassman; Raúl Juliá; Molly Ringwald
- Cinematography: Donald McAlpine
- Edited by: Donn Cambern
- Music by: Stomu Yamashta
- Production company: Columbia Pictures
- Distributed by: Columbia Pictures
- Release date: August 13, 1982 (United States)
- Running time: 142 minutes
- Country: United States
- Language: English
- Budget: $13 million
- Box office: $5,005,245

Tempest is a 1982 American adventure comedy-drama romance film directed by Paul Mazursky. It is a loose modern-day adaptation of Shakespeare's The Tempest. The picture features John Cassavetes, Gena Rowlands, Susan Sarandon, Raúl Juliá, and Molly Ringwald in her feature film debut.

The film won the People's Choice Award at the 7th Toronto International Film Festival.

== Plot ==
Phillip Dimitrius is a middle-aged New York City architect who is going through a difficult mid-life crisis.

After learning that his wife Antonia has been having an affair with his boss, Alonzo, Phillip leaves New York and travels to Greece with his teenage daughter, Miranda. In Athens, he meets Aretha Tomalin, a singer, and they become lovers. To escape Alonzo and his wife, who also come to Greece, they move to a remote Greek island. Phillip takes a vow of celibacy after they move to the island.

On the island, they encounter Kalibanos, an eccentric hermit, who was previously its only resident.

Phillip finally seems happy, until one day Alonzo, Antonia and others are spotted in a boat approaching the island. A storm, apparently called up by Phillip, shipwrecks the boat and the passengers land on the island. Phillip and Antonia reconcile, and they leave the island together with Miranda.

== Cast ==
- John Cassavetes as Phillip Dimitrius
- Gena Rowlands as Antonia Dimitrius
- Susan Sarandon as Aretha Tomalin
- Vittorio Gassman as Alonzo
- Raúl Juliá as Kalibanos
- Molly Ringwald as Miranda Dimitrius
- Sam Robards as Freddy
- Paul Stewart as Phillip's Father
- Jackie Gayle as Trinc
- Anthony Holland as Sebastian
- Jerry Hardin as Harry Gondorf
- Paul Mazursky as Terry Bloomfield
- Lucianne Buchanan as Dolores
- Vassilis Glezakos as Captain
- Luigi Laezza as Sailor
- Sergio Nicolai as Sailor
- Cookie Mueller as New Year's Eve Party Girl

== Background ==
The picture was filmed on location, including: Alypa Beach on the Mani Peninsula of the Peloponnesus; Athens, Greece; Atlantic City, New Jersey; and New York City, New York. Susan Sarandon's character's last name, Tomalin, is her own maiden name. She took her husband's last name when she married Chris Sarandon. The aerial footage of New York City at the end is accompanied by the song Manhattan, sung by Dinah Washington.

== Distribution ==
The film premiered in the United States on August 13, 1982.

It was screened at various film festivals, including: the Venice Film Festival, Italy; the Toronto International Film Festival, Canada; the Davao City Film Festival, Philippines; and others.

== Reception ==
=== Critical response ===
On Rotten Tomatoes the film has a rotten rating of 55% from 11 reviews, with an average rating of 5.7/10. Vincent Canby, film critic for The New York Times, was harsh in his review. He praised Paul Mazursky for some of his earlier works but Canby did not like this film, and wrote, "Tempest is an overblown, fancified freak of a film. Experiencing it is like watching a 10-ton canary as it attempts to become airborne. It lumbers up and down the runway tirelessly, but never once succeeds in getting both feet off the ground at the same time. The spectacle is amusing in isolated moments but, finally, exhausting." Roger Ebert gave it a negative review, writing: "The movie is an ambitious experiment, but a long and tedious one, and our revels end long before Mazursky's."

=== Box office ===
The film was a box office flop, only making $5,005,245 against a budget of 13 million.

=== Accolades ===
Wins

- Toronto International Film Festival: People's Choice Award, Paul Mazursky; 1982.
- Venice Film Festival: Pasinetti Award - Best Actress, Susan Sarandon; 1982.

Nominations

- Golden Globe Awards: Golden Globe; Best Actor in a Supporting Role, Raul Julia; New Star of the Year in a Motion Picture - Female, Molly Ringwald; 1983.
- Young Artist Awards: Best Young Supporting Actor in a Motion Picture, Sam Robards; Best Young Supporting Actress in a Motion Picture, Molly Ringwald; 1983.

== See also ==
- List of William Shakespeare film adaptations
