= Gekkenbriefje =

- Directed by: Olga Madsen
- Music by: Jakob Klaase
- Release date: 10 September 1981
- Running time: 84 minutes
- Country: Netherlands
- Language: Dutch

Gekkenbriefje (Alternatively: Crazy Going) is a 1981 Dutch film directed by Olga Madsen. It is based upon the book "Zorg dat je een gekkenbriefje krijgt" by Ger Verrips. It was the first movie directed by Olga Madsen. The film's premiere was on 10 September 1981, but it had previously premiered on television a year prior on 22 September 1980.

== Plot ==
In 1947, the Netherlands is engaged in the Indonesian War of Independence to protect its rule from the local population, which unilaterally declared independence in 1945 following the Japanese occupation. Willem, a young Dutchman who wants to become a physical education teacher, volunteers for military service, eager to fight for his country with the German occupation still fresh in his memory. However, he doubts whether he also wants to fight in Indonesia, and whether the struggle there is justified. When he is called up, he receives his basic training. The training is extremely tough, and Willem is treated particularly harshly by the sergeant at the training center, who considers Willem soft and constantly humiliates him. Willem comes under severe psychological pressure and begins to look for a way out. Someone tells him that a "gekkenbriefje" (a note declaring someone unfit for military service) is the way to get out of the army. If the army concludes that you are mentally unstable, you receive a note confirming this status and be discharged.

Willem begins to behave strangely and eventually strikes a high-ranking officer. He is arrested and examined in a military psychiatric institution. Here, he is one again confronted with the uprising in Indonesia. After various examinations, he is finally declared mentally unstable. He receives his "gekkenbriefje" and is allowed to go home. When Willem arrives at an overcrowded train, he hits an officer again and shows his "gekkenbriefje" to avoid consequences. Subsequently, he ends up traveling home in style, with an empty compartment all to himself.

== Cast ==
- Esgo Heil as Willem
- Porgy Franssen as Chris
- Hans Veerman as Engineer
- John Smit as KNIL-sergeant
- Marijke Conijn as Doctor's assistant
- Wim Dröge as Student from Leiden
- Paul Gieske as Baret
- Rietje Konings as Ward nurse
- Moniek Kramer as Canteen worker
- Gijs de Lange as Shooter
- Cor Witschge as Book trader
- Cor van den Brink as Doctor

== Reception ==
De Volkskrant wrote a generally positive review, noting the film proved Olga Madsen's capabilities in filmmaking, but criticised its length. De Telegraaf praised Gekkenbriefje as "a guy film" and Madsen's portrayal of a typically masculine subject with a largely male cast as "a remarkable feat for a woman". Frank Zaagsma in Het Parool observed a lack of political messaging in the film, and called the film "a missed chance" to deal with the legacy of the Dutch colonial empire. The Algemeen Dagblad lauded the film as "a compelling project".

Trouw called the film shallow and criticised Esgo Heil's acting, but praised the visual work of cinematographer Marc Felperlaan. Het Vrije Volk called the film as "a glimmer of hope for TV dramas", praising its focus on the internal psychology of war, thus going beyond traditional war films, but noted a lack of attention for the psychological background of the lead character. De Waarheid praised its portrayal of the feelings of isolation from which many political dissidents suffered during the 1950s and 1960s.
