= The Eyes, the Mouth =

- Film poster
- Directed by: Marco Bellocchio
- Written by: Marco Bellocchio; Vincenzo Cerami; Catherine Breillat
- Produced by: Enzo Porcelli
- Starring: Lou Castel
- Cinematography: Giuseppe Lanci
- Edited by: Sergio Nuti
- Music by: Nicola Piovani
- Production companies: Odyssia; RAI; Gaumont
- Distributed by: Gaumont Distribution
- Release dates: 1982 (Italy); 1984 (France)
- Running time: 93/101 minutes
- Countries: Italy; France
- Language: Italian

The Eyes, the Mouth (Italian: Gli occhi, la bocca, French: Les yeux, la bouche) is a 1982 Italian–French drama film directed by Marco Bellocchio.

== Plot ==
After the suicide of his twin brother Pippo, Giovanni, an actor past his prime, returns to his provincial hometown in Emilia-Romagna. Giovanni's brother Agostino and his uncle try to convince the mother that the death of her son was not self-inflicted but accidental. To the family's consternation, Pippo's former lover Wanda, a South American immigrant who lives in an apartment which he paid for her, shows no sign of grief. Giovanni learns that Pippo lamented that Wanda didn't love him and that she regularly meets with a young doctor. Although he blames her for his brother's death, Giovanni starts an affair with her.

== Cast ==
- Lou Castel as Giovanni (Italian voice: Sergio Castellitto)
- Ángela Molina as Wanda
- Emmanuelle Riva as the mother (Italian voice: Anna Maria Gherardi)
- Michel Piccoli as Uncle Nigi (Italian voice: Giulio Brogi)
- Antonio Piovanelli as Wanda's father
- Viviana Toniolo as Adele, Giovanni's sister
- Giampaolo Saccarola as Agostino, Giovanni's brother (as Gianpaolo Saccarola)
- Antonio Petrocelli as the doctor
- Maria Romagnoli
- Paolo Bacchi
- Osanna Borsari
- Daniele Mondini
- Giada Mondini

== Background ==
Like many of Bellocchio's films, The Eyes, the Mouth contains autobiographical parallels to the director's life, here the death of his twin brother who committed suicide in 1968.

== Release ==
The Eyes, the Mouth was shown in competition at the 39th Venice International Film Festival. The film was set to be screened on opening night, but was aborted due to its disobedience with a new censorship law, being delayed by a few days due to approval of an official visa from the regulators.

== Legacy ==
A restored version of the film was screened at the Museum of Modern Art, New York, in 2014.
