= Life Is Beautiful (1985 film) =

Life is Beautiful
- Directed by: Boro Drašković
- Starring: Rade Šerbedžija; Dragan Nikolić
- Edited by: Andrija Zafranovic
- Release date: 3 June 1985
- Running time: 1h 44min
- Country: Yugoslavia
- Language: Serbo-Croatian

Life is Beautiful (Život je lep) is a 1985 Yugoslav drama film directed by Boro Drašković.

== Cast ==
- Rade Šerbedžija - Vito
- Dragan Nikolić - Gara
- Sonja Savić - Singer
- Pavle Vuisić - Kruscic
- Ljubiša Samardžić - Valentino
- Predrag Laković - Masinovodja
- Ivan Bekjarev - Guitarist
- Tihomir Pleskonjić - Trumpeter
- Milan Puzić - Gospodin
- Milan Erak - Chauffeur
- Stevan Gardinovački - Koljac peradi
- Snežana Savić - Konobarica
- Bata Živojinović - Visoko pozicionirani drug
