= Orlow Seunke =

Dutch director and screenwriter

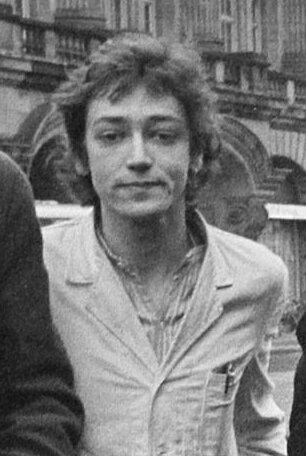
- Seunke in 1976
- Born: 22 September 1952 (age 73); Amsterdam, Netherlands
- Occupations: Filmmaker screenwriter

Orlow Seunke (born 22 September 1952) is a Dutch director, screenwriter and producer.

== Life and career ==
Born in Amsterdam, Seunke studied at the Dutch Film Academy, graduating in 1975.

After directing several shorts and TV works, Seunke made his feature film debut in 1982 with the critically-acclaimed The Hes Case at the 39th edition of the Venice Film Festival. It won the Silver Lion for Best First Work, and later was the recipient of several other accolades, including the Critics' Award at the Toronto Film Festival and the Bronze Hugo Award at the Chicago International Film Festival. His second work, Tracks in the Snow, was entered into the main competition at the 42nd Venice International Film Festival and won the Golden Calf Special Jury Prize at the Netherlands Film Festival.

In 2002 Seunke left the Netherlands and moved to Indonesia. Between 2003 and 2006 he was the artistic director of the Jakarta International Film Festival.

== Selected filmography ==
- 1982 - The Hes Case
- 1985 - Tracks in the Snow
- 1991 - Oh Boy!
- 1997 - Tropic of Emerald
