= Henri Béhar =

French-American film critic, journalist and subtitler

- Born: Cairo, Egypt
- Occupations: Subtitler; Film critic; Journalist
- Employer: Le Monde (North American correspondent)
- Known for: Subtitling over 100 French- and English-language films; regular participation in the Cannes Film Festival
- Notable work: Subtitling for directors including Woody Allen, Atom Egoyan, and Gus Van Sant

Henri Béhar is a subtitler, film critic and journalist who is best known for his regular participation in the Cannes Film Festival and for his subtitling of many well-known films.

== Life and career ==
Béhar was born to Jewish parents in Cairo and educated in Paris. He has been North American correspondent for the French newspaper Le Monde. He was familiar with Arabic, French, English and Italian from childhood and later learned German and Spanish.

He first worked as a subtitler for Woody Allen on Zelig in 1983. He went on to subtitle more than 100 films from French and English. He worked extensively with Woody Allen, Atom Egoyan, Todd Field and Gus van Sant. He has frequently chaired events at the Cannes Film Festival.

Béhar has been widely interviewed about his subtitling practice. He has referred to subtitling as "playing 3-D Scrabble in two languages". As a professional subtitler he sees subtitling as "a form of cultural ventriloquism, [...] the focus must remain on the puppet, not the puppeteer. Our task as subtitlers is to create subliminal subtitles so in sync with the mood and rhythm of the movie that the audience isn’t even aware it is reading. We want not to be noticed. If a subtitle is inadequate, clumsy, or distracting, it makes everyone look bad, but first and foremost the actors and the filmmakers. It can impact the film’s potential career."

== Films subtitled ==
Béhar has subtitled more than a hundred French- and English-language films.

- Zelig (Woody Allen, 1983)
- Plenty (Fred Schepisi, 1985)
- Thérèse (Alain Cavalier, 1986) (from French into English)
- Bull Durham (Ron Shelton, 1988)
- Crimes and Misdemeanors (Woody Allen, 1989)
- Drugstore Cowboy (Gus van Sant, 1989)
- Boyz n the Hood (John Singleton, 1991)
- Menace II Society (The Hughes Brothers, 1993)
- Strapped (Forest Whitaker, 1993)
- Exotica (Atom Egoyan, 1994)
- American Buffalo (Michael Corrente, 1996)
- Marvin's Room (Jerry Zaks, 1996)
- The Apostle (Robert Duvall, 1997)
- Good Will Hunting (Gus van Sant, 1997)
- Jackie Brown (Quentin Tarantino, 1997)
- The Sweet Hereafter (Atom Egoyan, 1997)
- Rounders (John Dahl, 1998)
- Shakespeare in Love (John Madden, 1998)
- In the Bedroom (Todd Field, 2001)
- Chicago (Rob Marshall, 2002)
- The Hours (Stephen Daldry, 2002)
- Little Children (Todd Field, 2006)
- Chloe (Atom Egoyan, 2009)
- Laurence Anyways (Xavier Dolan, 2012) (from Quebecois French to European French as well as English)
- Once Upon a Time in Hollywood (Quentin Tarantino, 2019)
