= Pozzolengo =

Pozzolengo Posolengh
- Comune
- Comune di Pozzolengo
- Location within Italy Location within Lombardy
- Coordinates: 45°24′N 10°38′E
- Country: Italy
- Region: Lombardy
- Province: Brescia (BS)
- Frazioni: Cavriana (MN), Desenzano del Garda, Lonato del Garda, Monzambano (MN), Peschiera del Garda (VR), Ponti sul Mincio (MN)

Area
  - Total: 21.40 km^{2} (8.26 sq mi)
- Elevation: 135 m (443 ft)

Population (2011)
  - Total: 3,455
  - Density: 161.4/km^{2} (418.1/sq mi)
- Demonym: Pozzolenghesi
- Time zone: UTC+1 (CET)
  - Summer (DST): UTC+2 (CEST)
- Postal code: 25010
- Dialing code: 030
- ISTAT code: 017151
- Patron saint: San Lorenzo
- Saint day: 10 August
- Website: Official website

Pozzolengo (Brescian: Posolengh) is an Italian municipality (comune) of 3,557 inhabitants in the province of Brescia, in Lombardy.

== Geography ==
Pozzolengo is located in northern Italy on the hills in the south of Lake Garda. Though in the province of Brescia (Lombardy), it borders two provinces (Mantua and Verona) and another region (Veneto).

Since it finds itself in a wet land and there used to be many wells, legend has it that the name Pozzolengo derives from the word well (pozzo in Italian).

The town has the following hamlets: Ballino, Belvedere, Bosco, Ceresa, Pirenei, Ponte del Cantone, Rondotto.

== History ==
The town was inhabited starting from Prehistory and saw different peoples.

Around 1000 the castle was built upon mount Fluno and in 1510 the church was built.

In the 19th century the territory of Pozzolengo was the scene of the battles for the Unification of Italy.

== Main sights ==
- Church of S.Lorenzo Martire
- Castle of Pozzolengo
- Monumental cemetery, built in 1881 by Giovanni Faini
- Mantelli Bog

== Cuisine ==
- Salame Morenico of Pozzolengo, awarded with the De.CO recognition
- Traditional biscuit of Pozzolengo, baked with using spelt flour
- Saffron of Pozzolengo
- Lugana white wine
