= Jean-Luc Bideau =

Swiss actor (born 1940)

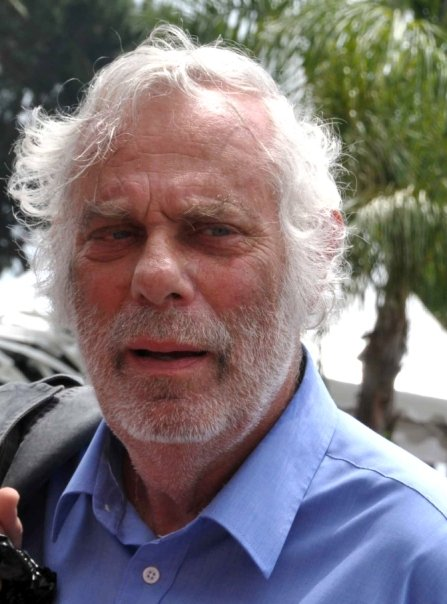
- Bideau at the 2009 Cannes Film Festival
- Born: 1 October 1940 (age 85); Geneva, Switzerland
- Occupation: Actor
- Years active: 1963–present
- Spouse: Marcela Salivarova (1979–present)
- Children: 2

Jean-Luc Bideau (born 1 October 1940) is a Swiss film actor.

== Personal life ==
Jean-Luc Bideau is married to Marcela Salivarova, a director of Czechoslovak origin. Together, they have two children: Nicolas, head of Presence Switzerland, and Martine, a doctor.

== Theater ==
Year	Title	Author	Director	Notes
1963	Bohemian Lights	Ramón del Valle-Inclán	Georges Wilson	Théâtre national de Chaillot
1963	Serjeant Musgrave's Dance	John Arden	Peter Brook	Théâtre de l'Athénée
1963	The Deputy	Rolf Hochhuth	François Darbon	Théâtre de l'Athénée
1964	Lorenzaccio	Alfred de Musset	Raymond Rouleau	Théâtre Sarah Bernhardt
1965	The Condemned of Altona	Jean-Paul Sartre	François Périer	Théâtre de l'Athénée
1965	The Birds	Aristophanes	Raymond Rouleau (2)	Théâtre national de Chaillot
1965	Le Hasard du coin du feu	Claude Prosper Jolyot de Crébillon	Jean Vilar	Théâtre de l'Athénée
1965	Le Dragon	Evguéni Schwartz	Pierre Debauche	Festival de Nanterre
1966	The Three Musketeers	Alexandre Dumas	Roger Planchon	Tour
1966	L'Auberge des Adrets	Benjamin Antier	Jean-Baptiste Thierrée	Théâtre de la Porte Saint-Martin
1967	The Ghost Sonata	August Strindberg	Jean Gillibert	Théâtre de l'Alliance française
1968	Capitaine Caragheuz	Louis Gaulis	Philippe Mentha	Théâtre de Saint-Gervais
1969	Les Anabaptistes	Friedrich Dürrenmatt	Jorge Lavelli	Grand Théâtre de Genève
1970	Carlotta	Miguel Mihura	William Jacques	Tour
1974	Le Creux	Michel Viala	François Rochaix	Théâtre de Carouge
1975	Miss Julie	August Strindberg	Catherine Eger	Comédie de Genève
1975	C’est beau	Nathalie Sarraute	Claude Régy	Théâtre d'Orsay
1976	The Resistible Rise of Arturo Ui	Bertolt Brecht	François Rochaix (2)	Théâtre de Carouge
1977-78	Travesties	Tom Stoppard	André Steiger	Odéon-Théâtre de l'Europe
1978	Cher Menteur	Jerome Kilty & Jean Cocteau	André Steiger (2)	Comédie de Genève
1978	Les gens déraisonnables sont en voie de disparition	Peter Handke	Claude Régy (2)	Théâtre Nanterre-Amandiers
1978	Le Jour et la nuit	Élie Pressmann	Pierre Boutron	Odéon-Théâtre de l'Europe
1980-82	Stratégie pour deux jambons	Raymond Cousse	Marcela Salivarova Bideau	Théâtre de Saint-Gervais
1983	Rhinoceros	Eugène Ionesco	Richard Vachoux	Nouveau Théâtre de Poche Genève
1984	The Elocution of Benjamin Franklin	Steve J. Spears	Marcela Salivarova Bideau (2)	Salle communale Plainpalais Genève
1984	La Dédicace	Botho Strauß	Joël Jouanneau	Théâtre Gérard Philipe
1986	Gospel of Marcion	Marcion of Sinope	Marcela Salivarova Bideau (3)	Palexpo
1988	La Cagnotte	Eugène Labiche	Jean-Michel Ribes	Comédie-Française
1988	Il faut passer par les nuages	François Billetdoux	Lucian Pintilie	Théâtre de la Ville
1989	The Marriage of Figaro	Pierre Beaumarchais	Antoine Vitez	Comédie-Française
1989	Aurora's Motive	Erich Hackl	Marcela Salivarova Bideau (4)	Odéon-Théâtre de l'Europe
1991	La Comtesse d'Escarbagnas	Molière	Jacques Lassalle	Comédie-Française
1991-93	The Imaginary Invalid	Molière	Gildas Bourdet	Comédie-Française
1992	Tales from the Vienna Woods	Ödön von Horváth	André Engel	MC93 Bobigny
1994	The Metamorphosis	Franz Kafka	Marcela Salivarova Bideau (5)	MC93 Bobigny
1994	Naïves Hirondelles	Roland Dubillard	Pierre Vial	Théâtre du Vieux-Colombier
1995	Intrigue and Love	Friedrich Schiller	Marcel Bluwal	Comédie-Française
1997	In the Company of Men	Edward Bond	Alain Françon	Théâtre national de la Colline
1998	Le Ping-Pong	Arthur Adamov	Gilles Chavassieux	Théâtre du Vieux-Colombier
1999	Les Huissiers	Michel Vinaver	Alain Françon (2)	Théâtre national de la Colline
2000-01	Lear	Edward Bond	Christophe Perton	Théâtre de la Ville
2003	Patate	Marcel Achard	Maurice Risch	Théâtre de la Ville
2008	Klapzuba's Eleven	Eduard Bass	Marcela Salivarova Bideau (6)	Théâtre de Saint-Gervais

== Filmography ==
Year	Title	Role	Director	Notes
1965	How to Keep the Red Lamp Burning	Swiss customer	Gilles Grangier & Georges Lautner	
1967	The Thief of Paris	Process server	Louis Malle	
1968	Mouche		Jacques Antoine	TV movie
1969	Mr. Freedom	A fighter	William Klein	
1969	Charles, Dead or Alive	Ambulance Driver	Alain Tanner	
1970	James ou pas	Hector	Michel Soutter	
1970	Le fou	Jean-Luc	Claude Goretta	
1971	The Salamander	Pierre	Alain Tanner (2)	
1972	Last Tango in Paris	Barge Captain	Bernardo Bertolucci	
1972	State of Siege	Este	Costa-Gavras	
1972	The Surveyors	Léon	Michel Soutter (2)	
1972	Le petit poucet	The king	Michel Boisrond	
1972	Les nénuphars		Michel Soutter (3)	TV movie
1972	Les dernières volontés de Richard Lagrange	The driver	Roger Burckhardt	TV series (1 episode)
1973	Belle	Mathieu Grégoire	André Delvaux	
1973	The Invitation	Maurice	Claude Goretta (2)	
1973	Projection privée	Denis Mallet	François Leterrier	
1973	La fille au violoncelle	Daniel	Yvan Butler	
1973	Salut, voleurs !	Swiss	Frank Cassenti	
1973	Les vilaines manières	Jean-Pierre Bouttier	Simon Edelstein	
1973	Evarella	Dr. Blank	Werner Grassmann	TV Short
1974	Voyage en Grande Tartarie	Alexis	Jean-Charles Tacchella	
1974	La puissance de l'homme	The man	Daniel Jouanisson	Short
1975	Serious as Pleasure	Man on the Road	Robert Benayoun	
1975	La traque	Philippe Mansart	Serge Leroy	
1975	L'homme du fleuve	Joseph Bertin	Jean-Pierre Prévost	
1976	Golden Night	Henri Fournier	Serge Moati	
1976	Jonah Who Will Be 25 in the Year 2000	Max	Alain Tanner (3)	
1976	Adios	Jérôme	André Michel	TV mini-series
1976	Cinéma 16	Gilles	Bernard Bouthier	TV series (1 episode)
1977	Sorcerer	Pascal	William Friedkin	
1977	Le jour de noces	Fotograf	Claude Goretta (3)	
1977	Une femme, un jour...	The dentist	Léonard Keigel	
1978	La barricade du Point du Jour	Bouillon	René Richon	
1978	Le coeur évanoui	André	Christian Gastaud	Short
1978	L'homme à la rhubarbe	The man	Jean-Yves Carrée	Short
1979	Ashanti	Marcel	Richard Fleischer	
1979	Instinct de Femme	Marthe's Brother	Claude Othnin-Girard	
1979	Et la tendresse? ... Bordel !	François	Patrick Schulmann	
1979	Melancoly Baby	Claude	Clarisse Gabus	
1979	Le point douloureux	T.	Marc Bourgeois	
1979	Destins parallèles		Jean-Yves Carrée (2)	
1980	Tout dépend des filles...	Jean-Luc	Pierre Fabre	
1980	Odo-Toum, d'autres rythmes	Alex	Costa Haralambis	
1980	Rendez-moi ma peau...	Krishmoon	Patrick Schulmann (2)	
1980	La sourde oreille	Bigout	Michel Polac	TV movie
1980	L'embrumé		Josée Dayan	TV movie
1981	Le rat	Johan	Elisabeth Huppert	Short
1981	Le bidule	Hochard	Régina Martial	TV movie
1981	Ce fleuve qui nous charrie	Simon	Raymond Vouillamoz	TV movie
1981	La meute	Pierre	Yvan Butler (2)	TV movie
1981	Caméra une première	Christian Miller	Jean-Pierre Bastid	TV series (1 episode)
1981	Le petit théâtre d'Antenne 2	The man	Antoine-Léonard Maestrati	TV series (1 episode)
1981	Cinéma 16	François	Josée Dayan (2)	TV series (1 episode)
1982	All Fired Up	Raoul Sarazin	Jean-Paul Rappeneau	
1982	Y a-t-il un Français dans la salle ?	Inspector Maurice Serruti	Jean-Pierre Mocky	
1982	Cinéma 16	Henri	Paul Seban	TV series (1 episode)
1983	Flirt	Giovanni Landini	Roberto Russo	
1983	Rock 'n Torah	Angel Gabriel	Marc-André Grynbaum	
1983	Panique au montage	The man	Olivier Esmein	Short
1983	Pauvre Eros	Julien Passerot	Georges Régnier	TV movie
1983	La chambre	Blumacher	Yvan Butler (3)	TV movie
1983	Le petit théâtre d'Antenne 2	The man	Philippe Ronce	TV series (1 episode)
1984	Le chien	Georges	Jean-François Gallotte	
1984	La combine de la girafe	The man	Thomas Gilou	Short
1984	Les malheurs de Malou	Wittenstein	Jeanne Barbillon	TV movie
1984	Le rat	Johan	Elisabeth Huppert (2)	TV movie
1984	Série noire	André Letellier	Raymond Vouillamoz (2)	TV series (1 episode)
1985	Drôle de samedi	Georges	Tunç Okan	
1985	L'amour propre ne le reste jamais très longtemps	Roussel	Martin Veyron	
1985	Eines Freundes guter Traum	The man	Burkhard Steger	
1985	L'enfant bleu	Laurent	Yvan Butler (4)	TV movie
1986	Inspecteur Lavardin	Max Charnet	Claude Chabrol	
1986	Les roses de Matmata	Henry Van Damme	José Pinheiro	
1986	Le bonheur a encore frappé	Achille Pinglard	Jean-Luc Trotignon	
1986	Dans la fosse aux ours	Willi	Erwin Keusch	TV movie
1986	Quando arriva il giudice	Il Giudice	Giulio Questi	TV mini-series
1986	Cinéma 16	Danton Layol	Philippe Condroyer	TV series (1 episode)
1987	Carnaval	Monnier	Ronny Coutteure	
1987	Les oreilles entre les dents	Jean-Paul Blido	Patrick Schulmann (3)	
1987	Florence ou La vie de château	Hector	Serge Korber	TV series (6 episodes)
1988	Mangeclous	Michael	Moshé Mizrahi	
1988	Les saisons du plaisir	Paul	Jean-Pierre Mocky (2)	
1988	Corps z'a corps	The obsessed reader	André Halimi	
1988	Una donna spezzata		Marco Leto	TV movie
1988	Silvia è sola	The man	Silvio Maestranzi	TV movie
1989	La piovra	Davide Faeti	Luigi Perelli	TV mini-series
1990	Mademoiselle Ardel	Éric Guichard	Michael Braun	TV movie
1991	Niklaus und Sammy		Alain Bloch	
1991	Pas une seconde à perdre	Constant Kovalsky	Jean-Claude Sussfeld	TV movie
1991	Felipe ha gli occhi azzurri		Gianfranco Albano & Felice Farina	TV mini-series
1991	Myster Mocky présente	Robert	Jean-Pierre Mocky (3)	TV series (1 episode)
1992	A Heart in Winter	Ostende	Claude Sautet	
1992	Ultime Printemps	Louis Vauthier	Magali Negroni	Short
1993	Pas d'amour sans amour !	François	Evelyne Dress	
1993	Liberate mio figlio	Fabio Fabri	Roberto Malenotti	TV movie
1993	Légendes de la forêt viennoise	Roimage	André Engel	TV movie
1994	Revenge of the Musketeers	Athos	Bertrand Tavernier	
1994	Fado majeur et mineur	Pierre	Raúl Ruiz	
1994	Coup de chien	Georges	Christian Faure	TV movie
1995	El techo del mundo	Pierre	Felipe Vega	
1995	Architruc	The man	Gérard Mordillat	TV movie
1996	Fourbi	Cameo	Alain Tanner (4)	
1996	Fantôme avec chauffeur	Édouard Martigues	Gérard Oury	
1996	Les Bidochon	The sexologist	Serge Korber (2)	
1996	Ricky	Brodsky	Philippe Setbon	TV movie
1996	Le bourgeois se rebiffe	Hubert Bellancourt de Lestaque	Jean-Pierre Alessandri	TV movie
1997	Marion	Audrey's Husband	Manuel Poirier	
1997	La montagne muette	Christophe	Frédéric Gonseth	
1997	Les années lycée : Petites	Emilie's Father	Noémie Lvovsky	TV movie
1997	Pardaillan	Honoré de Pardaillan	Édouard Niermans	TV movie
1998	The Red Violin	Georges Poussin	François Girard	
1998	RPM	Inspector LeBlanc	Ian Sharp	
1998	Mer agitée	The man	Jean-Baptiste Mathieu	Short
1998-2002	H	Professor Maximilien Strauss	Charles Nemes, Édouard Molinaro, ...	TV series (66 episodes)
1999	La vie ne me fait pas peur	Emilie's Father	Noémie Lvovsky (2)	
2000	Azzurro	Gaston Broyer	Denis Rabaglia	
2000	Stand-by	The Swiss customer	Roch Stéphanik	
2001	Les portes de la gloire	Paul Beaumont	Christian Merret-Palmair	
2001	Le parisien du village	The customs officer	Philippe Venault	
2002	Haute Pierre	Rowitz	Jean-Yves Pitoun	TV movie
2003	That Day	Raufer	Raúl Ruiz (2)	
2003	Ripoux 3	Bloret	Claude Zidi	
2003	Je t'aime, je t'adore	Norbert	Bruno Bontzolakis	
2003	Rosa la nuit	Maurice	Nicolas Cornut	Short
2003	Macho blues	Doctor Goldman	Jacques Akchoti	TV movie
2003	Maigret	Fumal	Jacques Fansten	TV series (1 episode)
2004	Au large de Bad Ragaz	Meyer	François-Christophe Marzal	
2004	Comme un poisson dans l'eau	M. Fisher	Camille Guillon	Short
2004	Le menteur	André	Philippe de Broca	TV movie
2004	La bonté d'Alice	François Dupré	Daniel Janneau	TV movie
2004	Le proc	Gilles Lebihan	Didier Albert	TV series (1 episode)
2005	Parlez-moi d'amour	Antoine	Lorenzo Gabriele	TV movie
2005	Colomba	General Neuville	Laurent Jaoui	TV movie
2005	La battante	Georges	Didier Albert (2)	TV mini-series
2006	Mon frère se marie	Michel	Jean-Stéphane Bron	Swiss Film Award - Best Performance in a Leading Role
2006	La grande peur dans la montagne	Barthélémy	Claudio Tonetti	TV movie
2006	Fête de famille	Francis Mercier	Lorenzo Gabriele (2)	TV series (6 episodes)
2007	His Majesty Minor	Archeo	Jean-Jacques Annaud	
2007	Pur week-end	M. Chappaz	Olivier Doran	
2008	Das Geheimnis von Murk	Freddy	Sabine Boss	
2008	La troisième partie du monde	The Physics professor	Eric Forestier	
2008	Une lumière dans la nuit	Charles Caron	Olivier Guignard	TV movie
2008	La mort dans l'île	Alain Jardié	Philippe Setbon (2)	TV movie
2009	Ivul	Father Ivul	Andrew Kötting	
2009	La famille Wolberg	Joseph	Axelle Ropert	
2009	Petites vacances à Knokke-le-Zoute	Jean-Claude	Yves Matthey	TV movie
2010	Bacon on the Side	Charles Lacroix	Anne Depétrini	
2010	Sauvage	Bernard	Jean-François Amiguet	
2010	Taxiphone : El Mektoub	Old Coyote	Mohammed Soudani	
2010	Opération Casablanca	Michel	Laurent Nègre	
2010	Qui a envie d'être aimé ?	Antoine's Father	Anne Giafferi	
2010	Un mari de trop	Alfred Lempereur	Louis Choquette	TV movie
2011	Let My People Go !	Maurice Goldberg	Mikael Buch	
2011	Bouquet final	Richard	Josée Dayan (3)	TV movie
2011	Platane	Himself	Denis Imbert & Éric Judor	TV series (1 episode)
2012-15	Ainsi soient-ils	Father Fromenger	Rodolphe Tissot, Elizabeth Marre, ...	TV series (24 episodes)
2013	Win Win	Pierre Theubet	Claudio Tonetti (2)	
2013	Les vieux calibres	Titi Le Pensec	Marcel Bluwal & Serge De Closets	TV movie
2013-14	Détectives	Maxime Roche	Renaud Bertrand, Lorenzo Gabriele (3), ...	TV series (16 episodes)
2015	Enfin en vacances, à la mer	Fabien's Father	Karim Adda & Francis Duquet	TV movie
2015	Scènes de ménages	Fabien's Father	Francis Duquet (2)	TV series (1 episode)
2015	Doc Martin	Docteur Fauvet	Rodolphe Chauvin & Stéphane Kappes	TV series (1 episode)
2015	Peplum	Sertor	Philippe Lefebvre	TV series (3 episodes)
2016	La Loi de la jungle	Rosio	Antonin Peretjatko	
2016	Le goût des choux de bruxelles	Octave	Michael Terraz	Short
2016	Camping paradis	Jean-Claude	Bruno Garcia	TV series (1 episode)
2017	Baby Bump(S)	Debulac	Noémie Saglio	
