= François Simon (actor) =

Swiss actor (1917–1982)

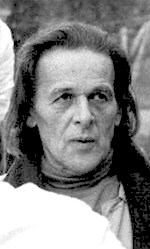
- Born: 16 August 1917; Geneva, Switzerland
- Died: 5 October 1982 (aged 65); Geneva, Switzerland
- Occupation: Actor
- Years active: 1936–1982

François Simon (French pronunciation: [fʁɑ̃swa simɔ̃]; 16 August 1917 – 5 October 1982) was a Swiss stage and film actor. He appeared in more than 30 films between 1936 and 1982. He was the son of actor Michel Simon.

== Filmography ==
Year	Title	Role	Notes
1936	Razumov: Sous les yeux d'occident		Uncredited
1939	Fric-Frac		Uncredited
1939	Extenuating Circumstances	La poupée	
1951	4 Num Jeep		Uncredited
1957	Bäckerei Zürrer	Marcel Piboulot	
1969	Charles, Dead or Alive	Charles Dé	
1970	The Mushroom	Le juge d'instruction Forman	
1970	Le fou	George Plond	
1971	To Die of Love	Monsieur Leguen	
1971	The Salamander	L'homme qui passait par là	
1972	Body of Love	Giacomo the Father	
1973	The Invitation	Emile	
1973	Der Tod des Flohzirkusdirektors	Ottocaro Weiss	
1975	La Chair de l'orchidée	Joszef Berekian	
1975	Pas si méchant que ça		(scenes deleted)
1976	Lumière	Grégoire	
1977	Violanta	Simon	
1977	Le jour de noces	Raymond Ducret	
1978	Alzire oder der neue Kontinent	Voltaire	
1978	The Suspended Vocation	La montagne	
1978	Judith Therpauve	Claude Hirsch-Balland	
1979	Christ Stopped at Eboli	Don Traiella	
1980	The Woman Cop	Docteur Godiveau	
1983	Basileus Quartet	Oscar Guarneri	
1986	François Simon la Présence	Himself	film portrait by Ana Simon and Louis Mouchet
