= Claude Richoz =

Swiss journalist (1929–2001)

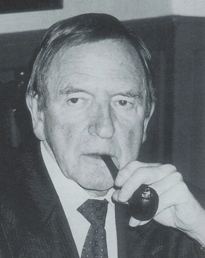
1998

Claude Richoz (25 March 1929 - 7 May 2001) was a Swiss journalist and art critic. Between 1976 and 1985 he served as editor in chief of La Suisse, at that time the leading daily newspaper in the French-speaking western part of the country ("Suisse romande").

== Life ==
Claude Richoz was born in the Les Eaux-Vives quarter of Geneva. His father and mother came from the francophone cantons of Fribourg and Vaud, respectively. He spent his childhood in Geneva's Le Petit-Saconnex quarter, which is where he attended primary school. A close school friend was Alain Tanner who later achieved notability as a film director. Between 1943 and 1948 Richoz wrote a series of poems which would be published in a single volume in 1954 under the title "Serge Henri" for which he won the 1954 Prix Interference.

He began to work as a journalist in 1946 when he teamed up with his friend Jean-Claude Muller to create a small local newspaper, "Farandole". He received his degrees from the Business school ("école de Commerce"). He travelled to Paris and then to Algeria, in 1952 returning to Geneva where he became editor in chief of "Jeunesse", produced under the auspices of the "Unions chrétiennes de jeunes gens" (YMCA). The next year he moved to Moutier, beyond Delémont to the north-east, where he became editor in chief at the Tribune jurassienne (as "Le Petit Jurassien" became known in 1953). Then between 1955 and 1960 he worked on "Vie protestante", also contributing on the fine arts to the Journal de Genève, one of the two principal daily newspapers published in Geneva. In the words of a former colleague, he always "loved books and fine writing" ("... aimé la belle écriture et les livres")

In 1960 he joined the Journal de Genève's main rival, de:La Suisse (Zeitung) La Suisse. He served as the newspaper's editor in chief between 1976 and 1985. He was also, between 1962 and 1965, president of the Geneva Press Association. A source describes him as "an old-fashioned chief editor, an intellectual, a kind of elder sage, generous and affable. And if he was marked by his departure from La Suisse, he never showed it" ("C'était un rédacteur en chef à l'ancienne, un intellectuel, une sorte de vieux sage, affable et généreux, et si son départ de La Suisse l'avait marqué, il n'en avait rien montré.").

After he retired he switched his focus towards social welfare. He became more engaged with "Secours aux réfugiés algériens et tunisiens", a refugee support organisation which he had created back in 1956, and with other Geneva-based support organisations. Shortly afterwards he became a prison visitor at the Champ-Dollon penitentiary on the east side of the city.

== Output (selection) ==
- Serge-Henry, Claude Richoz, Malines : Editions du CELF, 1954. Recueil de poèmes, prix Interference 1954.
- L’œuvre d' Alice Jaquet, A,-M. Burger, A. Berchtold, P.-F Schneeberge, préface de C. Richoz. Édition de la Prévôté, Moutiers, 1977.
- Paul Chaudet ...que nous aimions, Claude Richoz, Vulliens; Editions Mon village Vulliens, 1982, collection Visages et coutumes de ce pays
- Walter Uhl : le rêve capturé, Claude Richoz, Genève; Edition du Vieux-Chêne, 1985
- Raccourcis1, Claude Richoz; Claude Monnier, Lausanne; Paris : Pierre-Marcel Favre, 1986, collection Phalanstère, 185 pages, 17 cm, broché. ISBN 9782828902636
- Raccourcis 2, Claude Richoz, Lausanne; Paris : Pierre-Marcel Favre, 1987, collection Phalanstère, 244 pages, 17 cm, broché. ISBN 9782828903183
- Lorsque ces magasins s'appelaient hauts-bancs : Malbuisson, Galerie centrale, Fusterie, Claude Richoz, Micheline Tripet, Genève; S. Hurter, 1990
- Le Dr Jean-Pierre Othenin-Girard, Claude Richoz, Article Tribune de Genève, 1996 (26.06.1996)
- Hans Erni, grand artiste populaire, Claude Richoz, Article La Suisse, Genève, 1989 (09.02.1989)
