= Marie Dubois =

French actress

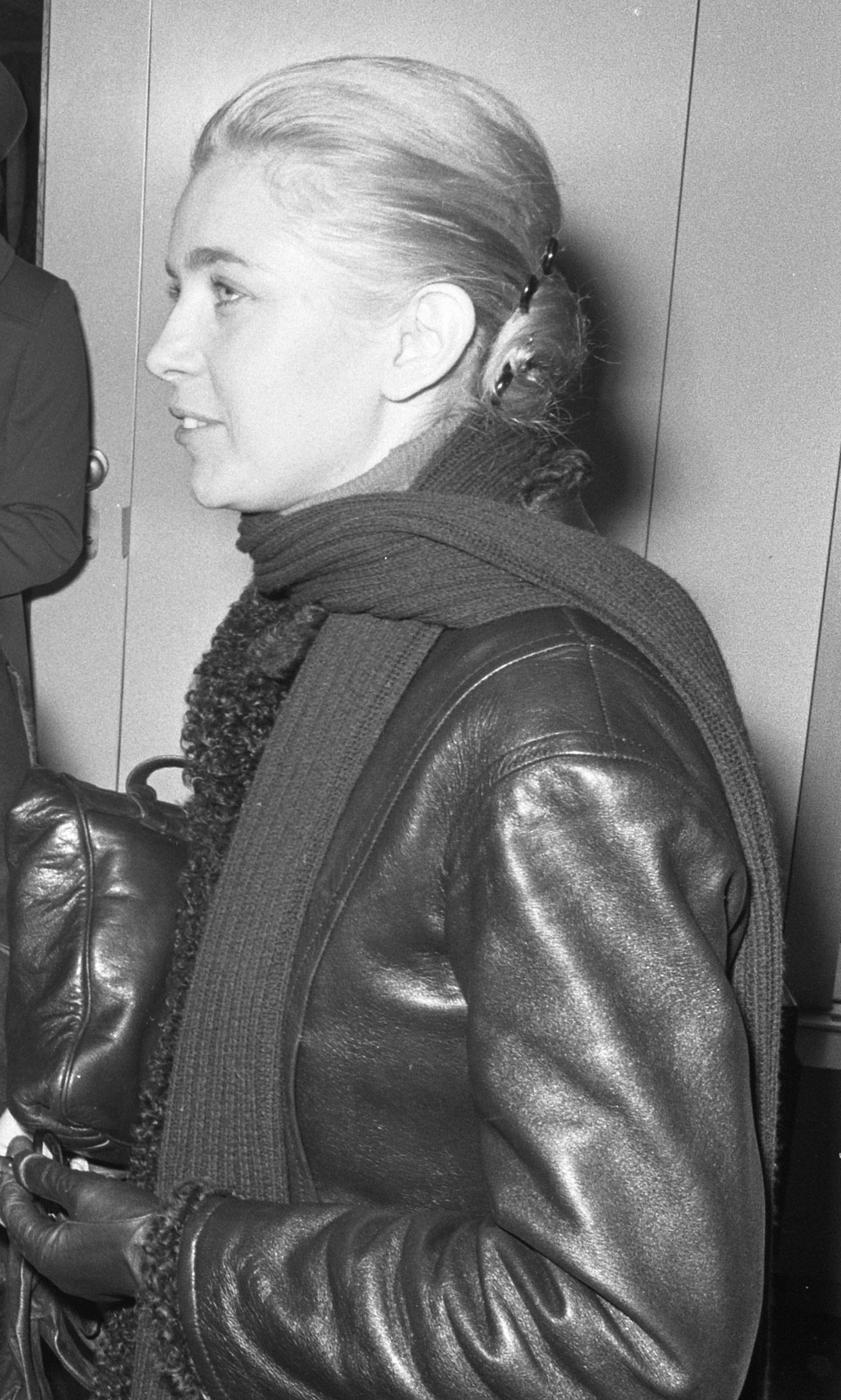
Marie Dubois

Marie Dubois (born Claudine Lucie Pauline Huzé; 12 January 1937 – 15 October 2014) was a French actress, born in Paris.

== Career ==
She studied at l'École de la rue Blanche (ENSATT) and made her film debut in 1959, first gaining notice the next year as Léna in François Truffaut's Shoot the Piano Player. She then played mainly supporting roles. In the 1960s she appeared in New Wave films such as Jules and Jim and The Thief of Paris, thrillers like Hot Line, and comedies like La Ronde, La Grande Vadrouille, and Monte Carlo or Bust. Her role in La Grande Vadrouille in 1966 was when she really gained fame.

Other film appearances by Dubois during the 1970s include L'Innocente, The Surveyors, Vincent, François, Paul et les autres, Night Flight from Moscow and La Menace. In 1978 she won the César Award for Best Supporting Actress for her role as Dominique Montlaur in La Menace. In the 1980s she appeared in Mon oncle d'Amérique, The Little Mermaid, Une femme en fuite, Garçon! and Descente aux enfers (for which she received a second César nomination for Best Supporting Actress in 1987 for her role as Lucette Beulemans).

== Personal life ==
Dubois married French film actor Serge Rousseau in 1961. They remained together until his death in 2007. The couple had a daughter, actress Dominique Rousseau. Marie Dubois died on 15 October 2014, aged 77, in Lescar, following a long battle with multiple sclerosis.

She attended classes at the rue Blanche in Paris and was part of the call of 1958 at the Conservatoire national supérieur d'art dramatique.

== Filmography ==
- 1960: Tirez sur le pianiste (Shoot the Piano Player) (directed by François Truffaut) - Lena
- 1961: Une femme est une femme (A Woman Is a Woman) (directed by Jean-Luc Godard) - Une amie d'Angela (uncredited)
- 1961: Le Monocle noir (directed by Georges Lautner) - Bénédicte de Villemaur
- 1962: Jules and Jim (Jules and Jim) (directed by François Truffaut) - Thérèse
- 1962: Le Signe du lion (directed by Éric Rohmer) - la femme du café (uncredited)
- 1962: La Croix des vivants (directed by Ivan Govar) - Gisèle
- 1962: L'Anglaise (directed by Artur Ramos)
- 1963: Jusqu'au bout du monde (directed by François Villiers)
- 1964: La Chasse à l'homme (directed by Édouard Molinaro) - Sophie
- 1964: La Ronde (Circle of Love) (directed by Roger Vadim) - la fille
- 1964: Week-end à Zuydcoote (Weekend at Dunkirk) (directed by Henri Verneuil) - Hélène
- 1964: That Tender Age (directed by Gilles Grangier) - Marie Malhouin
- 1964: Mata Hari, agent H21 (directed by Jean-Louis Richard) - la jeune fille (uncredited)
- 1965: Les Grandes Gueules (The Wise Guys) (directed by Robert Enrico) - Jackie Keller
- 1965: The Lace Wars (directed by René Clair) - Divine
- 1966: Le Dix-Septième Ciel (directed by Serge Korber) - Marie
- 1966: La Grande Vadrouille (directed by Gérard Oury) - Juliette
- 1967: Le Voleur (The Thief of Paris) (directed by Louis Malle) - Geneviève Delpiels
- 1968: Ce sacré grand-père (directed by Jacques Poitrenaud) - Marie
- 1968: Le Rouble à deux faces (directed by Étienne Périer) - Natasha
- 1968: Le Cascadeur (Stuntman) (directed by Marcello Baldi) - Yvette
- 1969: Monte Carlo or Bust! (directed by Ken Annakin) - Pascale
- 1970: La Maison des bories (directed by Jacques Doniol-Valcroze) - Isabelle Durras
- 1971: Bof… Anatomie d'un livreur (directed by Claude Faraldo)
- 1972: L'Œuf (after Félicien Marceau) (directed by Jean Herman) - Hortense Berthoullet
- 1972: Les Arpenteurs (The Surveyors) (directed by Michel Soutter) - Alice
- 1973: Le Serpent (Night Flight from Moscow) (directed by Henri Verneuil) - Mrs. Walter
- 1973: Antoine and Sebastian (directed by Jean-Marie Périer) - Corinne
- 1974: L'Escapade (directed by Michel Soutter) - Anne
- 1974: Vincent, François, Paul et les autres (directed by Claude Sautet) - Lucie
- 1976: Les Mal Partis (directed by Sébastien Japrisot) - la mère supérieure
- 1976: Du bout des lèvres (directed by Jean-Marie Degèsves) - Catherine
- 1976: The Innocent (directed by Luchino Visconti) - The princess
- 1976: Nuit d'or (Golden Night) (directed by Serge Moati) - Véronique
- 1977: La Menace (directed by Alain Corneau) - Dominique Montlaur
- 1979: Je vous ferai aimer la vie (directed by Serge Korber) - Anielle Doucet
- 1979: Il y a longtemps que je t'aime (directed by Jean-Charles Tacchella) - Brigitte Dupuis
- 1979: Je parle d'amour (directed by Madeleine Hartmann-Clausset) - Marie
- 1980: Mon oncle d'Amérique (directed by Alain Resnais) - Thérèse Ragueneau
- 1980: The Little Mermaid (directed by Roger Andrieux) - Bénédicte Pélissier
- 1982: Une femme en fuite (directed by Maurice Rabinowicz) - Mona
- 1983: L'Ami de Vincent (directed by Pierre Granier-Deferre) - Marion
- 1983: Garçon! (directed by Claude Sautet) - Marie-Pierre
- 1983: Si j'avais mille ans (directed by Monique Enckell)
- 1984: L'Intrus (directed by Irène Jouannet) - Anne
- 1986: Descente aux enfers (directed by Francis Girod) - Lucette Beulemans
- 1987: Grand Guignol (directed by Jean Marbœuf) - Germaine
- 1990: Un jeu d'enfant (directed by Pascal Kané) - Noémie
- 1991: Les Enfants du vent (directed by Krzystof Rogulski) - La femme du maire
- 1991: La Dernière Saison (directed by Pierre Beccu) - Marthe
- 1996: Confidences à un inconnu (directed by Georges Bardawil) - La mère
- 1996: Unpredictable Nature of the River (directed by Bernard Giraudeau) - La vieille Duchesse
- 1997: Rien ne va plus (The Swindle) (directed by Claude Chabrol) - Dedette
- 1999: À vot'service (directed by Eric Bartonio) - Grâce, "la dame-pipi" (segment "Jour de grâce, Le")
