= Fourbi =

1996 film

- Film poster
- Directed by: Alain Tanner
- Written by: Alain Tanner
- Starring: Karin Viard
- Cinematography: Denis Jutzeler
- Edited by: Monika Goux
- Music by: Michel Wintsch
- Production companies: Filmograph SA; Noë Production
- Release date: March 1996
- Running time: 114 minutes
- Countries: Switzerland; France
- Language: French

Fourbi is a 1996 French-Swiss drama film written and directed by Alain Tanner and starring Karin Viard. It follows a woman whose past is used for a television project. A writer and an actress then become involved in her life. The film was screened in the Un Certain Regard section at the 1996 Cannes Film Festival and later shown at festivals including Locarno, Montreal, and Hamburg.

== Synopsis ==
Rosemonde, who eight years earlier killed a man who allegedly tried to rape her, has sold her story to a television production company planning a dramatization of the case. A young writer is hired to develop the screenplay, but when she resists his attempts to revisit the events, a young actress is sent to speak with her instead. Their contact gradually develops into a personal bond.

== Cast ==
The cast includes:

- Karin Viard as Rosemonde
- Jean-Quentin Châtelain as Paul
- Cécile Tanner as Marie
- Antoine Basler as Pierrot
- Robert Bouvier as Kevin
- Jed Curtis as Sponsor
- Maurice Aufair as Paul's father
- Michèle Gleizer as Paul's mother
- André Steiger as theater professor
- Teco Celio as garage owner

== Background ==
Fourbi revisits motifs and characters from Tanner’s 1971 film La Salamandre.

== Reception ==
Pierre Lachat of Cinema 42 called Fourbi Alain Tanner’s best feature film since Dans la ville blanche. Filmbulletin described the film as the first of Tanner’s late works and wrote that it showed a new freshness and contemporary relevance. Variety found that while it had enough material for “a decent little movie,” Tanner “failed to develop any of the characters much beyond their starting positions”.

== Festival screenings ==
The film was screened in the Un Certain Regard section at the 1996 Cannes Film Festival. Later in 1996, it was shown at the 49th Festival internazionale del film Locarno, the 20th Montreal World Film Festival, and the 4th Filmfest Hamburg. It was also screened at the Brussels Film Festival in 1997.
