= Messidor (disambiguation) =

Messidor is a month in the French Republican calendar.

Messidor can also refer to:

- Messidor (opera), 1897 opera by Alfred Bruneau
- Messidor (film), 1979 film directed by Alain Tanner
