= Jean Champion =

French actor (1917–2001)

- Born: 9 March 1917; Chalon-sur-Saône, France
- Died: 23 May 2001 (aged 84); Chalon-sur-Saône, France
- Occupation: Actor
- Years active: 1962-1996

Jean Champion (9 March 1917 – 23 May 2001) was a French film actor. He appeared in 60 films between 1962 and 1996.

== Partial filmography ==
- Cléo from 5 to 7 (1962) - Le patron du café (uncredited)
- The Longest Day (1962) - French Resistance Fighter (uncredited)
- Muriel (1963) - Ernest
- La foire aux cancres (Chronique d'une année scolaire) (1963)
- Le journal d'un fou (1963)
- The Umbrellas of Cherbourg (1964) - Aubin
- Monsieur (1964) - Le patron de l'hôtel
- The Thief of Paris (1967) - Le patron de l' Hôtel de la Biche
- Mise à sac (1967) - Kerini
- La chasse royale (1969) - Metzer
- Le Cercle rouge (1970) - Le garde-barrière
- La Cavale (1971) - Le directeur de la prison
- Mais qui donc m'a fait ce bébé? (1971)
- Les caïds (1972)
- The Invitation (1973) - Alfred
- Day for Night (1973) - Bertrand, le producteur
- The Day of the Jackal (1973) - Detective (uncredited)
- Section spéciale (1975) - L'avocat général Léon Guyenot
- Monsieur Klein (1976) - Le gardien de la morgue
- March or Die (1977) - Minister
- Le Crabe-tambour (1977) - L'homme dans le café
- L'Honorable Société (1978) - Gaston de Marcilly
- Le sucre (1978)
- Félicité (1979) - Le médecin
- Retour en force (1980) - Un membre de l'amicale de la R.A.T.P.
- Une robe noire pour un tueur (1981) - Le père de reynolds
- Viens chez moi, j'habite chez une copine (1981) - Le patron du Taxi-frêt
- The Games of Countess Dolingen (1981) - Un convive
- Le Maître d'école (1981) - L'inspecteur
- Coup de Torchon (1981) - Priest
- Les fantômes du chapelier (1982) - Le sénateur Laude
- The Blood of Others (1984) - Liftier Meurice
- L'amour à mort (1984) - (voice)
- Bernadette (1988) - Un chanoine
- Life and Nothing But (1989) - Lagrange
- I Want to Go Home (1989) - Le chauffeur de taxi / Taxi driver
- Les Anges gardiens (1995) - Grand-père du Père Tarain
