= The Surveyors =

1972 film

- Directed by: Michel Soutter
- Written by: Michel Soutter
- Starring: Jean-Luc Bideau
- Release date: 1972
- Running time: 85 minutes
- Country: Switzerland
- Language: French

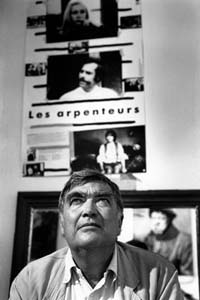
A photograph of Michel Soutter taken in 1990 by Erling Mandelmann.

The Surveyors (French: Les arpenteurs) is a 1972 Swiss drama film written and directed by Michel Soutter. It was entered into the 1972 Cannes Film Festival.

== Cast ==
- Jean-Luc Bideau as Leon
- Michel Cassagne as Max
- Jacques Denis as Lucien
- Marie Dubois as Alice
- Armen Godel as The Lawyer
- Jacqueline Moore as Ann
- Germaine Tournier as Alice's Mother
