= Monte Carlo or Bust! =

1969 film by Ken Annakin

- British theatrical poster
- Directed by: Ken Annakin; Sam Itzkovitch
- Written by: Ken Annakin; Jack Davies
- Produced by: Ken Annakin
- Starring: Bourvil; Lando Buzzanca; Walter Chiari; Peter Cook; Tony Curtis; Mireille Darc; Marie Dubois; Gert Frobe; Susan Hampshire; Jack Hawkins; Nicoletta Machiavelli; Dudley Moore; Peer Schmidt; Eric Sykes; Terry-Thomas
- Cinematography: Bertil Palmgren; Gábor Pogány; Walter Wottitz
- Edited by: Peter Taylor
- Music by: Ron Goodwin
- Production companies: Marianne Productions; Basil Keys Productions; Les Films Concordia; Dino De Laurentiis Cinematografica
- Distributed by: Paramount Pictures
- Release dates: 28 May 1969 (New York); June 1969 (UK); 6 November 1969 (Italy); 28 August 1970 (France)
- Running time: 130 minutes 122 minutes (edited international release version)
- Countries: United Kingdom; France; Italy
- Language: English
- Box office: $1,125,000 (US/ Canada rentals)

Monte Carlo or Bust! is a 1969 epic comedy film, also known by its American title, Those Daring Young Men in Their Jaunty Jalopies. A co-production of the United Kingdom, France and Italy, the story is based on the Monte Carlo Rally – first raced in 1911 – and the film, set in the 1920s, recalls this general era. A lavish all-star film (Paramount put $10 million behind it), it is the story of an epic car rally across Europe that involves a lot of eccentric characters from all over the world who will stop at nothing to win.

The film is a sequel to the 1965 hit Those Magnificent Men in their Flying Machines. Terry-Thomas appeared as Sir Cuthbert Ware-Armitage, the equally dastardly son of Sir Percy Ware-Armitage, whom Thomas had played in the earlier film. Some others of the cast from the first film returned, including Gert Fröbe and Eric Sykes. Like the earlier film, it was written by Ken Annakin and Jack Davies and directed by Annakin, with music by Ron Goodwin. The title tune is performed by Jimmy Durante. The credits sequence animation was the work of Ronald Searle, who was also featured in Annakin's earlier Those Magnificent Men in their Flying Machines. Tony Curtis and Susan Hampshire played other contestants in the race; Curtis also starred in the similar period-piece comedy The Great Race (1965) from Warner Bros.

The film was originally intended to be called Rome or Bust. The American distributors Paramount Pictures re-titled it Those Daring Young Men in Their Jaunty Jalopies to tie it to Annakin's 1965 film; re-editing also meant cuts, up to a half-hour, from the original British release.

Lobby card for Monte Carlo or Bust!

== Plot ==
In the 1920s, the Monte Carlo Rally attracts competitors from all over the world. Rivals from Britain, Italy, France and Germany find that their greatest competition comes from the United States in the form of Chester Schofield, who had won half of an automobile factory in a poker game with Sir Percy, the late father of baronet Sir Cuthbert Ware-Armitage. Ware-Armitage has entered the race in a winner-take-all to exact revenge and win back the lost half of the company.

The international cast of characters appear to mirror their national foibles. British Army officers Maj. Digby Dawlish and Lieut. Kit Barrington, who have entered to preserve the honour of the British Empire, drive an outlandish vehicle festooned with odd inventions. Italian policemen Angelo Pincelli and Marcello Agosti seem to be more interested in chasing three French women, led by Doctor Marie-Claude. The German entry from overbearing Willi Schickel and Otto Schwartz turn out to be convicts, driving with stolen gems on board.

As the race begins, the contestants find that not only are they in a 1,500-mile battle with each other, but dangerous roads and the elements including a massive avalanche, are just as formidable. Chester and his new co-driver, Betty, end up duelling with Sir Cuthbert. Various misfortunes plague each of the contestants, with Cuthbert, poised to win, being disqualified for cheating, the British Army team blowing up, the Germans being arrested and Chester falling asleep at the wheel. In the end, the Italians are declared the winners and share their winnings with the French women's team to help people injured in the snowslide. Chester does eventually cross the finish line, albeit because Betty and some others have pushed his car.

== Cast ==
- Bourvil as Monsieur Dupont
- Lando Buzzanca as Marcelo Agosti
- Walter Chiari as Angelo Pincilli
- Peter Cook as Major Digby Dawlish
- Tony Curtis as Chester Schofield
- Mireille Darc as Marie-Claude
- Marie Dubois as Pascale
- Gert Fröbe as Willi Schickel / Horst Muller
- Susan Hampshire as Betty
- Jack Hawkins as Count Levinovitch
- Nicoletta Machiavelli as Dominique
- Dudley Moore as Lieutenant Kit Barrington
- Peer Schmidt as Otto Schwartz
- Eric Sykes as Perkins
- Terry-Thomas as Sir Cuthbert Ware-Armitage
- Jacques Duby as Policeman
- Hattie Jacques as Journalist
- Derren Nesbitt as Waleska
- Nicholas Phipps as Golfer
- William Rushton as John O'Groats, Race Official
- Michael Trubshawe as German Rally Official
- Richard Wattis as Secretary
- Walter Williams as Customs Official

== Production ==
=== Development ===
Ken Annakin had a huge success with Those Magnificent Men in Their Flying Machines. In September 1965 he announced he would make a follow-up to that film set in the early days of automobile racing. Its working title was The Monte Carlo Rally and All That Jazz. He wrote the script with Jack Davies, with whom he had collaborated on Those Magnificent Men. He wanted to re-use some of the old cast, including Terry-Thomas, Gert Fröbe and Alberto Sordi, plus one American, possibly James Garner. Annakin estimated the film would cost under $6 million.

In March 1968 Annakin announced that Tony Curtis would star. The cast would also include Terry-Thomas, Fröbe, Eric Sykes, Walter Chiari, and Sordi. Finance was provided by Paramount and filming would take over six months in Rome, Monte Carlo and the Italian and French Alps. "I love the international flavor of it", said Annakin.

=== Shooting ===
Besides the studio work at the Dino De Laurentiis Cinematografica Studios, Rome and Lazio, Italy, principal photography took place from 31 March–May 1968 at a large number of locations: England, Paris, France, Monaco, Monte Carlo, Monte Gelato Falls, Treja river, Italy and Åre, Jämtlands län, Sweden. Most of the exotic locations were from the second-unit directors while studio process shots mainly inserted the lead actors into the scenes.

Annakin had difficulties working with American screen idol, Tony Curtis, and considered him, "brittle, self-centered and a bully". Curtis, however, enjoyed his time in Rome, one of the primary filming locations and became romantically linked to his co-star, Susan Hampshire.

An excerpt from composer Ron Goodwin's cue, "The Schickel Shamble" became the theme music for the long-running BBC Radio 4 comedy series I'm Sorry I Haven't a Clue which later featured Willie Rushton as a regular panellist.

=== Automobiles ===
Chester Schofield (Curtis) is driving an Alvis Speed 20 (1932–36) named the "Triple S, Six-Sylinder Special", and Willi Schickel (Fröbe) is in a Mercedes SSK (1928–32). Sir Cuthbert Ware-Armitage (Terry-Thomas)'s car first is a Ware-Armitage, while his official entry is in a "Nifty Nine, Mark II", probably it's a 1929 Austin Heavy 12/4 Burnham. The other British team is in a Lea-Francis, outfitted with an array of ingenious contraptions including the Dawlish Klaxon, the Dawlish Periscope, the Dawlish Snow Stoppers, the Dawlish Snow Melter, bits to turn it into the Dawlish Super Snow Tractor, Dawlish Extending Foglamp and rocket boosters. Marcelo Agosti (Lando Buzzanca) and Angelo Pincilli (Walter Chiari) are in a Lancia Lambda, while Dominique (Nicoletta Machiavelli) drives a Peugeot 201 ... and lurking in the background are a bullnose Morris Oxford (1919–26) and a Blower Bentley (1927–31).

Ex-racer David Watson was in charge of the cars. "The automobiles should give me a good 30 percent of the comedy", said Annakin.

=== Music ===
The music was composed by Ron Goodwin. The title track, (called "Monte Carlo or Bust" despite the US name change to the film) is sung by Jimmy Durante. A piece of music playing during a German prison escape scene, called "The Schickel Shamble", has been used as the theme music for I'm Sorry I Haven't a Clue since its inception in 1972.

== Release ==
The film opened 28 May 1969 at the Astor Theatre and Beekman Theatre in New York City. The film grossed $46,800 in its opening week.

== Reception ==
Monte Carlo or Bust! was favourably received by audiences and critics alike. The comparison to Annakin's earlier work, notwithstanding, The New York Times review noted, "... the picture is lively and often hilarious, as the drivers hang on for dear life and the old cars honk, collide and careen. There is hardly a turn without a bang-up or a mix-up."

In the opinion of the writer Matthew Sweet, Peter Cook as Major Digby Dawlish, and Dudley Moore as Lt. Kit Barrington, are the performers who have the humour in the film that survives best. Cook's Major Dawlish is the creator of a series of fairly ludicrous inventions – the feeling hovers "that it might be all over for Britain." Sweet states that it is a send-up of the British Empire, "which is very 1960s and not far from the sort of thing they would have been doing in The Establishment Club in Soho a few years earlier, where really for the first time, these upper-class stereotypes had been sent up with a vein of cruelty as well as a vein of affection. I think you can see it as a kind of post-Empire film." Cook and Moore play the representatives of Empire:

Major Dawlish (Cook): I think it's pretty clear whose side the Lord is on, Barrington.
Barrington (Moore): England, sir?
Major Dawlish (Cook): Naturally.

More recent reviews have not been as complimentary, with Leonard Maltin characterising it as mid-fare, a movie that has "some funny scenes, but backfires a bit too often."
