= Le Maître d'école =

1981 film

Le maître d'école
- Directed by: Claude Berri
- Written by: Claude Berri; Jules Celma
- Produced by: Pierre Grunstein
- Starring: Coluche; Josiane Balasko; Jacques Debary; Charlotte de Turckheim
- Cinematography: Colin Mounier
- Edited by: Hervé de Luze; Arlette Langmann
- Music by: Claude Engel; Richard Gotainer
- Distributed by: AMLF
- Release date: 28 October 1981
- Running time: 105 minutes
- Country: France
- Language: French
- Box office: $19.6 million

Le maître d'école is a 1981 French comedy film directed by Claude Berri.

== Plot ==
Gérard Barbier was a clothing salesman. Dismissed because he defended a child caught stealing boots, he becomes a teacher. Once at school, he realizes it is not quite the profession as he had seen it.

== Cast ==
- Coluche : Gérard Barbier
- Josiane Balasko : Mrs. Lajoie
- Jacques Debary : Director
- Charlotte de Turckheim : Charlotte
- Roland Giraud : Mr. Meignant
- André Chaumeau : Academic advisor
- Jean Champion : Inspector
- Georges Staquet : Gérard's father
