= The Diary of Lady M =

1993 film

- Directed by: Alain Tanner
- Written by: Myriam Mézières
- Starring: Myriam Mézières; Juanjo Puigcorbé; Félicité Wouassi
- Cinematography: Denis Jutzeler
- Production companies: Filmograph SA; Messidor Films; Les Productions Lazennec
- Release date: 1993
- Running time: 108 minutes
- Countries: Switzerland; Belgium; Spain; France
- Language: French

The Diary of Lady M (French: Le journal de Lady M) is a 1993 Swiss drama film directed by Alain Tanner and written by Myriam Mézières, who also stars. A co-production between Switzerland, Belgium, Spain and France, the film follows a Paris nightclub singer whose affair with a Catalan painter becomes entangled with his marriage. It screened at festivals including Locarno, Montréal, Toronto, London and Istanbul.

== Synopsis ==
Lady M, a nightclub singer in Paris, falls in love with Diego, a Catalan painter. After spending several passionate days with him in Spain, she leaves him when she discovers that he is married. Unable to let go of him, she later invites him to Paris. Diego arrives with his wife and young daughter, leading to a triangular relationship that gradually narrows into a relationship between the two women. This relationship also ends, and the women part ways.

== Cast ==
The cast includes:

- Myriam Mézières as Lady M
- Juanjo Puigcorbé as Diego
- Félicité Wouassi as Nuria
- Antoine Basler as the man from Kismet
- Carlotta Soldevilla as the woman from No. 35

== Production ==
Mézières wrote the screenplay based on her own diary, with the story presented through her first-person narration.

== Reception ==
Variety wrote that the film was “at its best” in its depiction of the backstage world of singers and artists, and praised Mézières’s performance, while finding the later events hurried and the ending improbable. Filmdienst wrote that it concerns desire, possession and devotion, as well as the divide between reason and passion, but found that its naturalistic sex scenes contributed little to those themes. Cinémathèque suisse described the film as a poem about the wounds of love.

== Festival screenings ==
The film was later screened at festivals including the Taormina BNL Film Fest, the 46th Locarno Festival, the 17e Festival des films du monde in Montréal, the Toronto International Film Festival and the BFI London Film Festival in 1993, and the Solothurner Filmtage and the 15th International Istanbul Film Festival in 1996.
