= La provinciale (1981 film) =

French-Swiss drama film

- Directed by: Claude Goretta
- Written by: Claude Goretta; Jacques Kirsner; Rosina Rochette
- Produced by: Yves Peyrot; Raymond Pousaz
- Starring: Nathalie Baye
- Cinematography: Dominique Brenguier
- Edited by: Joële van Effenterre
- Distributed by: Gaumont Distribution
- Release date: 21 January 1981
- Running time: 107 minutes
- Countries: France; Switzerland
- Language: French
- Box office: $2.7 million

La provinciale is a 1981 French-Swiss drama film directed by Claude Goretta. It was entered into the 31st Berlin International Film Festival.

== Cast ==
- Nathalie Baye as Christine
- Angela Winkler as Claire
- Bruno Ganz as Remy
- Patrick Chesnais as Pascal
- Jean Davy as B. de Larive
- Jacques Lalande as the promoter
- Jean Obé as Trabert
- Dominique Paturel as Ralph
- Jean Valmont as Dargeol
- Pierre Vernier as the publisher
- Paul Andrieu as Dangelle
- Jean Bollery as Jacques Legean
- Vincent Grass
