= Jacques Debary =

French actor (1914–2011)

Jacques Debary (25 November 1914 – 9 December 2011) was a French actor.

== Filmography ==
Year	Title	Role	Notes
1957	Les Lavandières du Portugal	Minor Role	Uncredited
1967	The Thief of Paris	Courbassol	
1970	The Time to Die	Le médecin	
1971	Un peu de soleil dans l'eau froide	Fairmont	
1972	Les Camisards	Gédéon Laporte	
1972	Le Tueur	Le commissaire de Marseille	
1972	La Scoumoune	Carl	
1973	Les zozos	Le surveillant général	
1973	The Dominici Affair	Le commissaire divisionnaire	Uncredited
1973	Rude journée pour la reine	Albert	
1974	Black Thursday	Le curé / Priest	
1974	Une baleine qui avait mal aux dents	L'homme au téléphone	
1974	The Phantom of Liberty	Le président du tribunal	
1974	Borsalino & Co.	Le préfet	
1974	Les suspects	Le père de Vauquier	
1974	La merveilleuse visite	Père Léon	
1975	Pas si méchant que ça	Le père de Pierre	
1975	Le mâle du siècle	Le père d'Isabelle	
1975	Aloïse	L'ancien directeur	
1975	The Big Delirium	Georges	
1976	Jarosław Dąbrowski	Bourcier	
1976	La surprise du chef	Le directeur	
1976	Boomerang	Le président Lenoir	
1976	Moi, Pierre Rivière, ayant égorgé ma mère, ma sœur et mon frère...	Le docteur Bouchard	
1977	That Obscure Object of Desire	Un voyageur	
1977	A. Constant	Dictation voice	
1981	Allons z'enfants	Camparois	
1981	Le Maître d'école	Le directeur	
1983	Anna Pavlova	Camille Saint-Saëns	TV movie
