= The Time to Die =

1970 film

- Directed by: André Farwagi
- Starring: Anna Karina
- Cinematography: Willy Kurant
- Release date: 8 July 1970
- Running time: 82 minutes
- Country: France
- Language: French

The Time to Die (French: Le Temps de mourir) is a 1970 French crime film directed by André Farwagi and starring Anna Karina. It was entered into the 20th Berlin International Film Festival.

== Cast ==
- Anna Karina as Young Girl
- Bruno Cremer as Max Topfer
- Jean Rochefort as Hervé Breton
- Billy Kearns as Helmut
- Daniel Moosmann as Marco
- Michel Beaune
- Jacques Debary
- Lara Koski
- Gaëtan Noël
- Georges Ser
- Yanti
- Catherine Rich as Isabelle Breton
