= Golden Night =

1976 film

- Directed by: Serge Moati
- Written by: Serge Moati; Françoise Verny
- Starring: Klaus Kinski
- Cinematography: André Neau
- Edited by: Jacqueline Tarrit
- Music by: Pierre Jansen
- Release date: October 1976
- Running time: 78 minutes
- Countries: France; West Germany
- Language: French

Golden Night (French: Nuit d'or, German: Die Nacht aus Gold) is a 1976 French drama film directed by Serge Moati and starring Klaus Kinski.

== Plot ==
A man who was considered dead returns in order to get back at those enemies who tried to kill him off.

== Cast ==
- Bernard Blier as Commissaire Pidoux
- Klaus Kinski as Michel Fournier
- Marie Dubois as Véronique
- Jean-Luc Bideau as Henri Fournier
- Charles Vanel as Charles Fournier
- Anny Duperey as Andrée
- Elisabeth Flickenschildt as Anna, Michel's mother
- Raymond Bussières as Charron, a gambler
- Valérie Pascale as Catherine, the little girl
- Maurice Ronet as Henry aka Nuit d'or
