= The Invitation (1973 film) =

- Directed by: Claude Goretta
- Written by: Claude Goretta; Michel Viala
- Starring: Jean-Luc Bideau
- Cinematography: Jean Zeller
- Edited by: Joële van Effenterre
- Music by: Patrick Moraz
- Production companies: Planfilm; Citel Films; Groupe 5
- Release date: 1973
- Running time: 100 minutes
- Country: Switzerland
- Language: French

The Invitation (French: L'Invitation) is a 1973 Swiss comedy-drama film directed by Claude Goretta and written by Goretta and Michel Viala. The film follows a group of office workers at a social gathering where tensions begin to surface. It shared the Jury Prize at the 1973 Cannes Film Festival and was nominated for the Academy Award for Best Foreign Language Film at the 46th Academy Awards.

== Synopsis ==
The staff of an office gather for a summer party at a colleague’s new country house. As the event progresses, social restraints begin to loosen and the celebration eventually falls apart.

== Cast ==
The cast includes:

- Jean-Luc Bideau as Maurice Dutoit
- François Simon as Emile
- Jean Champion as Alfred Lamel
- Pierre Collet as Pierre Collard
- Cécile Vassort as Aline Thévoz

== Reception ==
=== Awards and nominations ===
At the 1973 Cannes Film Festival, The Invitation shared the Jury Prize. It was nominated for the Academy Award for Best Foreign Language Film at the 46th Academy Awards, where the award went to Day for Night of France.

=== Critical response ===
The Guardian described The Invitation as a "wry, observant comedy" in which social decorum gradually wears off during a garden party. The Los Angeles Times described the film as a “bittersweet comedy-drama”. The New Yorker called the film “a bewitchingly attentive tale about the blossoming of the mundane”. Filmdienst wrote that Goretta uses the film’s tragicomic social setting to reveal human behaviour in a subtle and never harsh way, without becoming heavy-handed or moralising.

== Festival screenings ==
The film premiered in 1973. It was later shown at festivals including the Festival international du film francophone de Namur and the Entrevues - Festival International du Film de Belfort in 1995, and the 64th Festival del film Locarno in 2011.

== See also ==
- List of submissions to the 46th Academy Awards for Best Foreign Language Film
- List of Swiss submissions for the Academy Award for Best Foreign Language Film
