= Adolphe Appia =

Swiss architect and theorist of stage lighting and décor

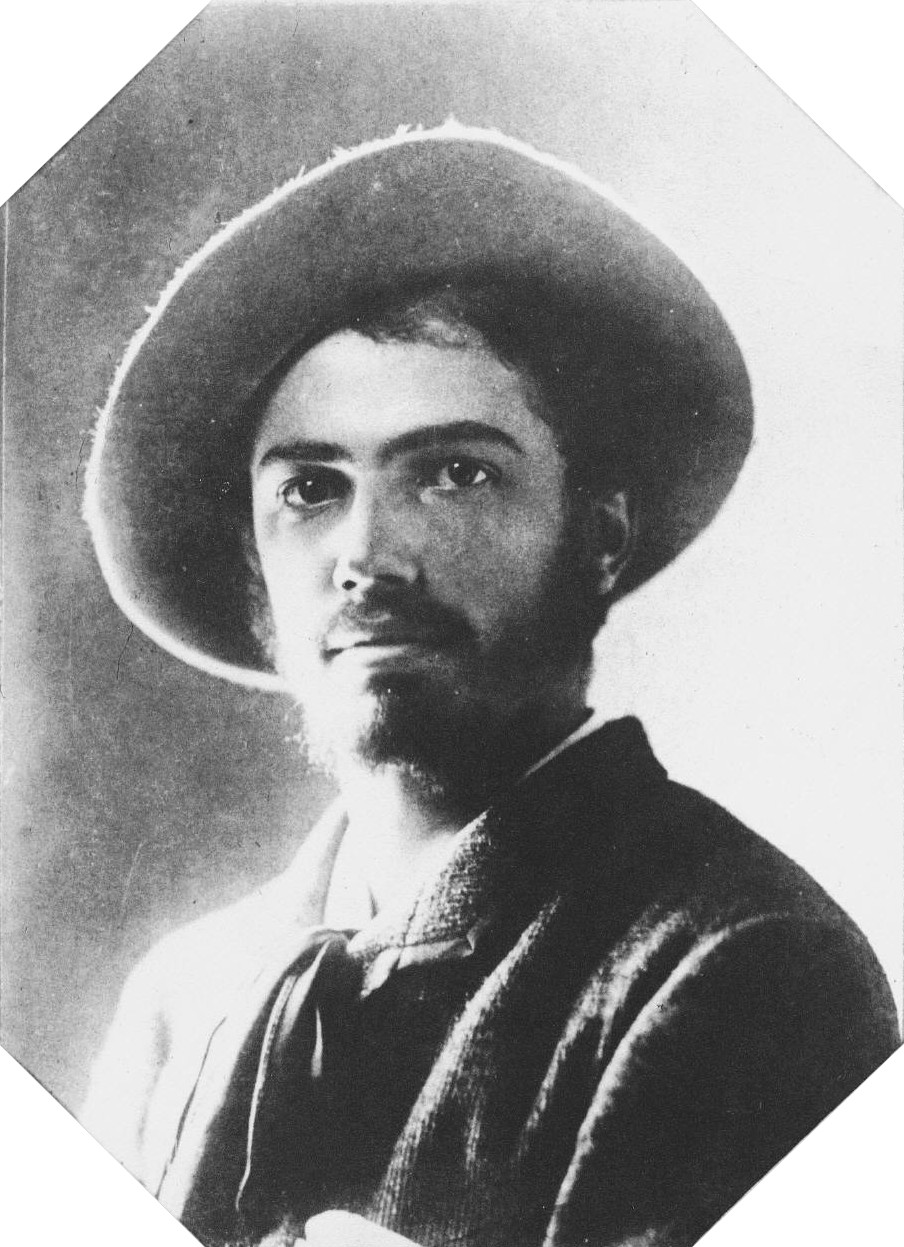
- Adolphe Appia in 1882
- Born: 1 September 1862; Geneva, Switzerland
- Died: 29 February 1928 (aged 65); Nyon, Switzerland
- Occupations: Architect; Set designer Lighting designer

Adolphe Appia (1 September 1862 – 29 February 1928) was a Swiss architect and theorist of stage lighting and décor. He was the son of Red Cross co-founder Louis Appia.

== Early life ==
Adolphe Appia was raised in Geneva, Switzerland, in a "strictly Calvinistic home".^{:7} He attended boarding school at the Collège de Vevey starting in 1873 at the age of 11, where he remained until 1879.^{:7}

He saw his first professional theatre production at the age of 16, when he attended a production of Charles Gounod's Faust.^{:8} He studied music at the Leipzig Conservatory (1882–83) and at a music school in Dresden (1886–90).^{:8}

== Career ==
Appia is best known for his many scenic designs for Wagner’s operas.^{:7} He rejected painted two-dimensional sets for three-dimensional "living" sets because he believed that shade was as necessary as light to form a connection between the actor and the setting of the performance in time and space. Through the use of control of light intensity, colour and manipulation, Appia created a new perspective of scene design and stage lighting.

Directors and designers have both taken great inspiration from the work of Appia, whose design theories and conceptualizations of Wagner's operas have helped to shape modern perceptions of the relationship between the performance space and lighting. One of the reasons for the influence of Appia's work and theories, is that he was working at time when electrical lighting was just evolving. Another is that he was a man of great vision who was able to conceptualize and philosophize about many of his practices and theories.

== Theories ==
The central principle underpinning much of Appia's work is that artistic unity is the primary function of the director and the designer. Appia maintained that two dimensional set painting and the performance dynamics it created, was the major cause of production disunity in his time. He advocated three elements as fundamental to creating a unified and effective mise-en-scène:

1. Dynamic and three dimensional movements by actors;
2. perpendicular scenery;
3. using depth and the horizontal dynamics of the performance space.

Appia saw light, space and the human body as malleable commodities which should be integrated to create a unified mise-en-scène. He advocated synchronicity of sound, light and movement in his productions of Wagner's operas and he tried to integrate corps of actors with the rhythms and moods of the music. Ultimately however, Appia considered light as the primary element which fused together all aspects of a production and he consistently attempted to unify musical and movement elements of the text and score to the more mystical and symbolic aspects of light. He often tried to have actors, singers and dancers start with a strong symbolic gesture or movement and end with another strong symbolic pose or gesture. In his productions, light was ever changing, manipulated from moment to moment, from action to action. Ultimately, Appia sought to unify stage movement and the use of space, stage rhythm and the mise-en-scène.

Appia was one of the first designers to understand the potential of stage lighting to do more than merely illuminate actors and painted scenery. His ideas about the staging of "word-tone drama", together with his own stagings of Tristan und Isolde (Milan, 1923) and parts of the Ring (Basel, 1924–25) have influenced later stagings, especially those of the second half of the 20th century.

For Appia and for his productions, the mise-en-scène and the totality or unity of the performance experience was primary and he believed that these elements drove movement and initiated action more than anything else (Johnston, 1972). Appia's designs and theories went on to inspire many other theatre creators such as Edward Gordon Craig, Jacques Copeau and Wieland Wagner.

== Works ==
- La mise en scéne du théatre Wagnerien (Paris: Léon Chailley, 1895)
- Musique et mise en scéne (Munich: Bruckmann, 1899)
- L’œuvre d’art vivant (Geneva: Atar, 1921)

See also the articles about Appia written by Prince Serge Wolkonsky (in Russian Wiki)

== Filmography ==
- Adolphe Appia, Visionary of Invisible (1988), a film by Louis Mouchet

== Bibliography ==
- Anderson, Ross, The Appian Way (Zurich: Park Books, 2025)
- Anderson, Ross. The Appian Way, AA Files Vol. 75 (December 2017):163-182.
- Bablet Denis, Bablet Marie-Louise. Adolphe Appia. 1862-1928. Actor – Space – Light – Pro Helvetia, Zurich and John Calder (Publishers) Ltd, London/Riverrun Press, New York.1982
- Beacham, R.C. Adolphe Appia: Theatre Artists (Directors in Perspective Series), Cambridge University Press, Cambridge, 1987.
- Brockett, O. History of the Theatre, Allyn and Bacon, Boston, 1994.
- Claire-Lise Dutoit, Music. Movement. Therapy. A Dalcroze Book. London, 1977.
- Wills, R. The Director in a Changing Theatre, Mayfield, Palo Alto, 1976.
- Adolphe Appia, Visionary of Invisible, a film by Louis Mouchet, 1988
- Joël Aguet (2005). "Adolphe Appia". In Andreas Kotte (ed.). Theaterlexikon der Schweiz / Dictionnaire du théâtre en Suisse / Dizionario Teatrale Svizzero / Lexicon da teater svizzer [Theater Dictionary of Switzerland] (in French). Vol. 1. Zürich: Chronos. pp. 59–60. ISBN 978-3-0340-0715-3. LCCN 2007423414. OCLC 62309181.
