= Descent into Hell (film) =

1986 film by Francis Girod

- Theatrical release poster
- French: Descente aux enfers
- Directed by: Francis Girod
- Written by: Jean-Loup Dabadie; Francis Girod
- Based on: The Wounded and the Slain by David Goodis
- Produced by: Ariel Zeitoun
- Starring: Claude Brasseur; Sophie Marceau; Betsy Blair; Hippolyte Girardot; Sidiki Bakaba; Gérard Rinaldi; Marie Dubois
- Cinematography: Charles Van Damme
- Edited by: Genevieve Winding
- Music by: Georges Delerue
- Production companies: Images Investissements; Sofica Créations; Sofima; Investimage
- Distributed by: Acteurs Auteurs Associés
- Release date: 5 November 1986 (France)
- Running time: 88 minutes
- Country: France
- Language: French

Descent into Hell (French: Descente aux enfers) is a 1986 French psychological thriller film directed by Francis Girod from a screenplay he co-wrote with Jean-Loup Dabadie, based on the 1955 novel The Wounded and the Slain by David Goodis. The film stars Claude Brasseur and Sophie Marceau as a married couple—she with a dark secret in her past and he, an author suffering from both writer's block and alcoholism—who undergo experiences which strain their relationship to breaking point while vacationing in Haiti.

== Plot ==
Staying in a luxurious hotel in Port-au-Prince, Haiti, are the beautiful and sensual Lola, aged about 20, and her husband Alan, a pulp writer some 30 years older. The stay was meant to give him the opportunity to start a new book, but he spends much of the time drinking. Frustrated at his behaviour, she starts an affair with a French fellow guest. Drunk in an empty street, Alan is attacked but, defending himself with an empty bottle, leaves his assailant dead. A witness, Théophile, offers to keep quiet for a huge sum in cash, upon which he will return the bottle. Selling her jewels, Lola raises the money and throws the bottle into the sea. Not satisfied that this is the end of the story, Alan confesses to the police, who do not believe him because he can produce no proof of the killing and they have already locked up a suspect. Alan then goes to Théophile to urge him to testify, but the man attacks him and in the ensuing struggle is left nearly dead. The film ends with Alan in hospital and Lola, whose deep bond with him has been renewed, at his bedside.

== Cast ==
- Claude Brasseur as Alan Kolber
- Sophie Marceau as Lola Kolber
- Betsy Blair as Mrs. Burns
- Hippolyte Girardot as Philippe Devignat
- Sidiki Bakaba as Theophile Bijou
- Gérard Rinaldi as Elvis
- Marie Dubois as Lucette Beulemans

Claude Braseur and Sophie Marceau had co-starred in two other films, which had attained great popularity in France: La Boum (1980) and its sequel, La Boum 2—where they played father and daughter. Their pairing in Descente, given their age difference (thirty years) and the nude scenes, led to criticism that Brasseur had no credibility playing Marceau's husband after having played her father.

In an interview with Europe 1, Brasseur said, "Playing Sophie Marceau's father in La Boum... then her lover in ‘Descent into Hell’ four years later, is a choice that cost me dearly. It came not as a surprise but as a schock. When ‘Descent into Hell’ came out, there were a lot of letters sent to Gaumont, Sophie and me. I came close to being accused of incest." Girod commented in 2005, in the film's DVD bonuses, "After I convinced Sophie Marceau to shoot nudity scenes for the film, my wickedness drove me to offer the role of her husband to Claude Brasseur. I found that very amusing because he had made the Boum [films] where he played Sophie's father. Besides, among us on the set, we called ‘Descent into Hell’ ... the X-rated Boum (laughs). [...] This was less amusing to a certain number of Claude Brasseur's groupies who sent him insulting letters when the film was released ('Bastard! Have you no shame?').”)

== Music ==
The CD soundtrack was composed by Georges Delerue.
