= Orfeo (film) =

1985 film

- Directed by: Claude Goretta
- Written by: Claude Goretta; Alessandro Striggio (libretto)
- Starring: Gino Quilico
- Cinematography: Giuseppe Rotunno
- Edited by: Marie-Sophie Dubus
- Music by: Claudio Monteverdi
- Release date: 1985
- Language: Italian

Orfeo is a 1985 opera film co-written and directed by Claude Goretta. A co-production between Switzerland, Italy, France and Canada, it is an adaptation of the opera L'Orfeo by Claudio Monteverdi. It premiered out of competition at the 42nd Venice International Film Festival.

== Cast ==
- Gino Quilico as Orfeo
- Audrey Michael as Euridice / Speranza / Éco
- Carolyn Watkinson as the messenger
- Danielle Borst as Proserpina
- Frangiskos Voutsinis as Plutone / Caronte
- Colette Alliot-Lugaz as Music
- Éric Tappy as Apollo
- François Le Roux as the spirit / a shepherd
- Shelley Whittingham as the nymph
- Guy de Mey as a shepherd
- Henri Ledroit as a shepherd
