= Louis Mouchet =

Swiss independent film maker

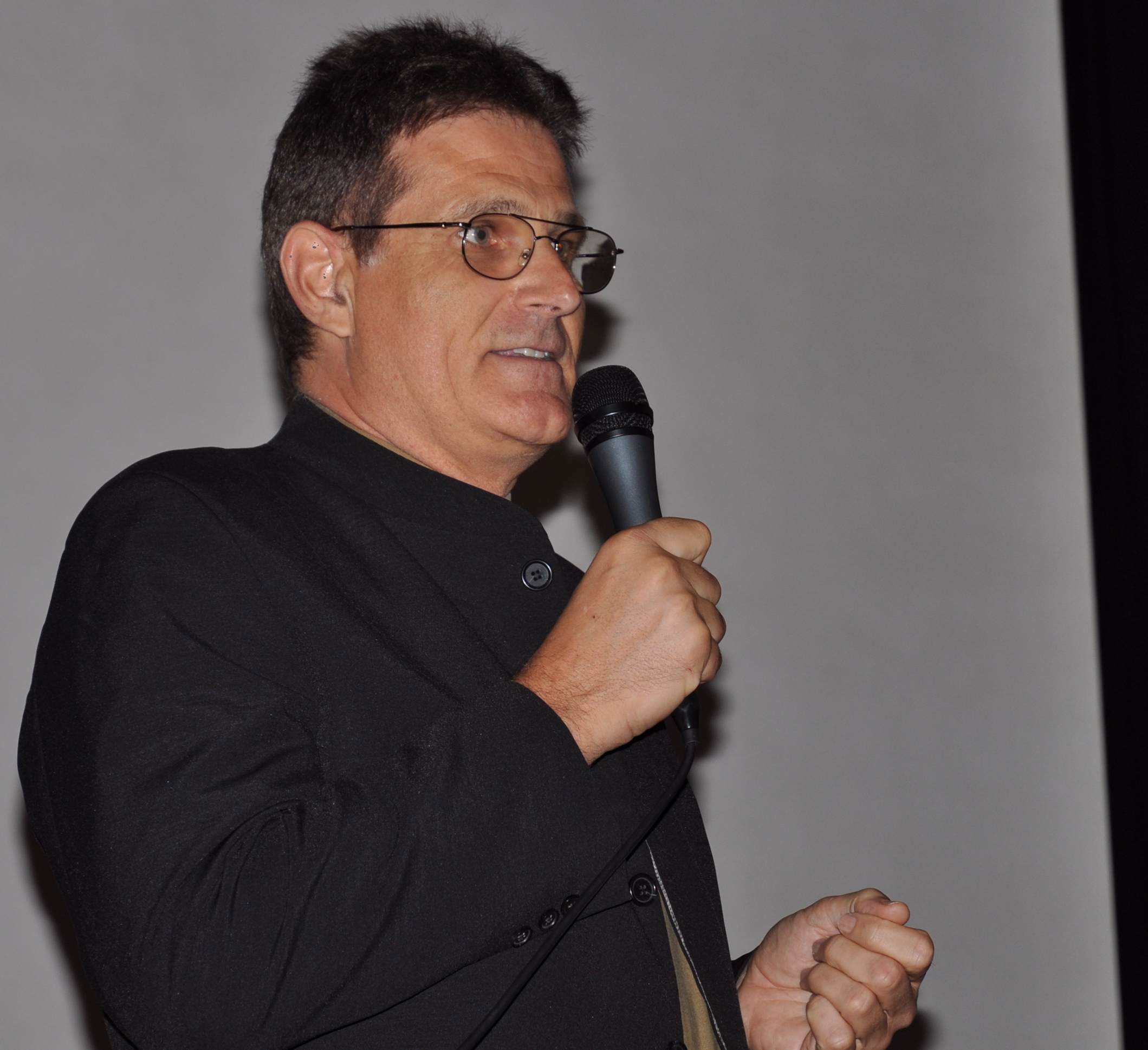
- Louis Mouchet presenting Rromani Soul, October 2009.
- Born: Louis Charles Mouchet; 25 March 1957 (age 69); Geneva, Switzerland
- Occupations: Film director, producer, writer.
- Years active: 1983–present
- Spouse: Dorothy Cox (1986–present)

Louis Mouchet (born 25 March 1957) is a Swiss independent film-maker born in Geneva, Switzerland.

== Biography ==
Louis Mouchet spent his early childhood in Tunisia, where his parents went to teach after the country's independence. "It was and still is a lost paradise."

After studying literature at the University of Geneva, Louis Mouchet graduated from the London International Film School in 1983. His first professional job was an assignment for the Red Cross. This led to a successful collaboration that continues to this day. It has been extended to other humanitarian and international organizations.

His first documentary was the result of a proposal from François Simon's widow to co-direct a film about the legendary actor. This first step led Louis Mouchet to write and direct many film and television documentaries.

== Filmography ==
- François Simon the Presence (with Ana Simon, 1986). Portrait of Swiss actor François Simon, son of Michel Simon. With the participation of Jeanne Moreau, Daniel Schmid and Paco Ibáñez.
- Adolphe Appia the Visionary of Invisible (1989). Portrait of stage designer Adolphe Appia.
- The Jodorowsky Constellation, a portrait of cult film-maker and artist Alejandro Jodorowsky.
  With the participation of Jean Giraud aka Moebius, Peter Gabriel, Fernando Arrabal and Marcel Marceau.
- The Secret of Secret (2000), film about traditional healers in the Alps.
- Blues Road Movie (Au Coeur du Blues, 2001), film retracing the epic of Blues from Mali to New Orleans, and from Mississippi to Chicago.
  With Boubacar Traoré, Corey Harris, Koko Taylor, Willie "Big Eyes" Smith, Super Chikan and Bobby Rush.
- Rromani Soul (2008). Following the "Queen of the Gypsies" Esma Redzepova, The film reveals the true origins of the Romani people, set by linguist Marcel Courthiade in the Indian city of Kannauj, Uttar Pradesh.
- Santa Shakti, the sacred feminine power beyond languages and religions (2017).
- Seeds to Grow (2017-2020), Web Series. Filmed portraits of inspiring personalities: Alvin Queen (jazz drummer), Carla Haddad (humanitarian leader), Patrick Delarive (serial entrepreneur), Anju Rupal, (social entrepreneur).
- The Family Forest (2022). Psychogenealogy and epigenetics through a very personal experience. In this film, Louis Mouchet reveals his own transgenerational therapy that was initiated during the production of The Jodorowsky Constellation.
- Seeds to Grow (2nd season, 2025-2026), filmed portraits of humanitarian leader Sitara Jabeen and tech entrepreneur Serge Huber.
