= Boubacar Traoré (musician) =

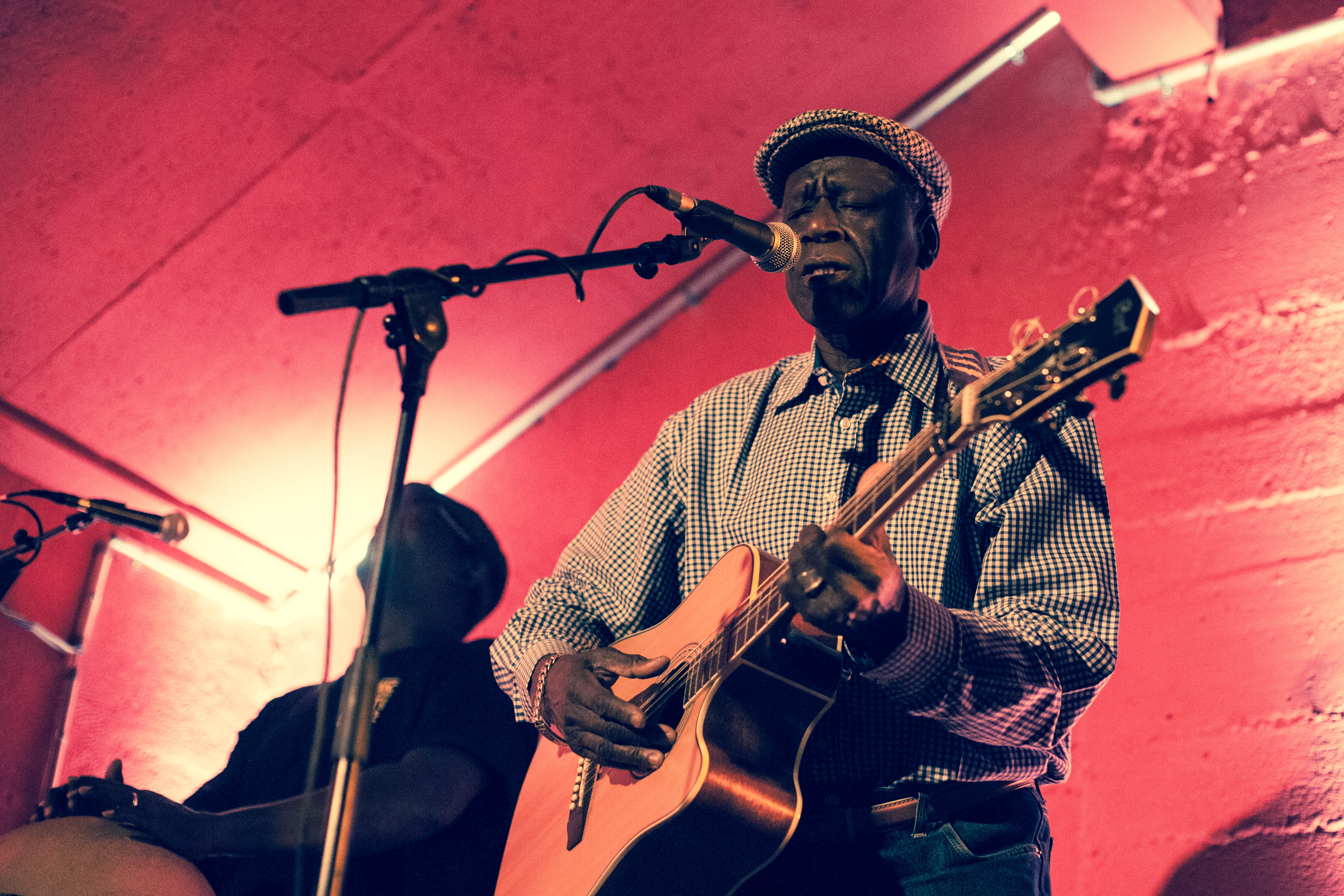
- Boubacar Traoré

Background information
- Also known as: "Kar Kar"
- Born: 1942 (age 83–84); Kayes, Mali
- Genres: Blues; West African Music; World
- Instruments: Vocals, guitar
- Label: Label Bleu/Indigo
- Website: boubacartraore.com

Boubacar Traoré (born 1942 in Kayes, Mali) is a Malian singer, songwriter, and guitarist.

== Biography ==
=== Early life ===
As a child Traoré was a local soccer star getting the nickname "Kar Kar", meaning "dribble dribble". His brother, had been to Cuba to study the guitar, becoming a teacher. At the age of 17, he secretly taught himself the guitar, playing it like the kora, and later being taught by his brother. In the late 1950s he listened to local and Cuban music, gaining access to American music such as Chuck Berry and jazz in the 1960s.

=== Early fame ===
Traoré first came to prominence in the early 1960s, as music opportunities were opened to non-griots by the socialist government. He was a superstar in Mali and a symbol of the newly independent country (see History of Mali). His songs were immensely popular and he enjoyed regular radio play. However, he made no recordings, and since there were no royalties paid to musicians, he was very poor.

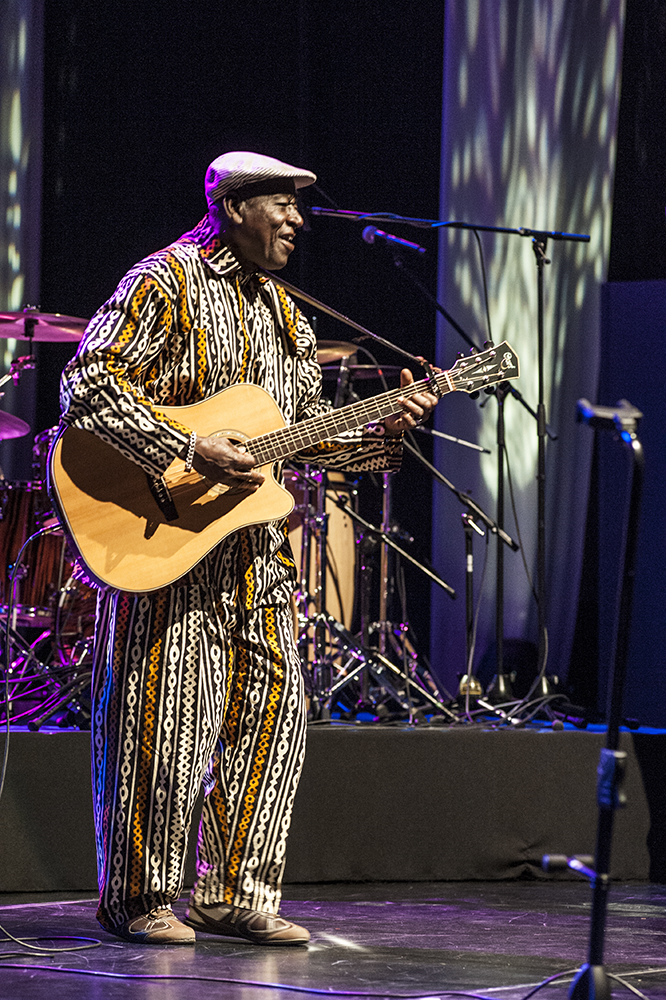
Malian singer and guitarist Boubacar Traore performing at the Cross Culture Festival in Warsaw, Poland - September 2012.

=== Decline and revival ===
In 1968, when Moussa Traoré overthrew Malian president Modibo Keïta, Boubacar Traoré, widely seen as an artist associated with the previous regime, disappeared from the airwaves. After this Traoré did farm work and opened a shop with his brother. During the 1970s Traoré's popularity faded until a surprise television appearance in 1987. Of his eleven children five died in childhood, and soon after this "rediscovery" his wife Pierrette died during childbirth. Grief-stricken, he moved to France and did construction work to support his children. While there, a British record producer of the Sterns record label discovered a leaked tape of one of Traoré's radio performances, and he was finally signed to a record deal. His first album, Mariama, was released in 1990. Since then, Traoré has enjoyed international popularity, touring Europe, North America, and Africa.

Boubacar figures in the book Mali Blues (Lonely Planet, Australia), by Belgian writer Lieve Joris. The book inspired Swiss film director Jacques Sarasin for the 2001 film Je chanterai pour toi ("I'll Sing For You") about Boubacar, released on DVD in 2005.
Along with several blues artists, he appeared in the film Blues Road Movie (Au Coeur du Blues) by Louis Mouchet (2001).

Boubacar then released Kongo Magni (Marabi, 2005), produced by Christian Mousset, director of the Festival Musiques Métisses d'Angoulême (Angoulême Cross-Cultural Music Festival), who would also produce his Mali Denhou (Lusafrica, 2010). Kar Kar made up for lost time with acclaimed live performances around Europe and then the United States and Canada. Mbalimaou (My Brothers) was released in February 2015, followed by Dounia Tabalo in November 2017 and a live album Live! Boubacar Traoré & Vincent Bucher & Jeremie Diarra in 2024.

Despite their shared last name, he is not related to Malian singer/guitarist Rokia Traoré, although they performed a duet together on her 2000 album Wanita.

When Traoré is not touring, he raises sheep and farms vegetables on a plot of land he owns in Bamako.

== Style and influence ==
Traoré has a unique style that blends pentatonic structures found in West Africa's Mande cultural region, American blues music, and Arab music. While Traoré acknowledges that his music has American influences, he says that his music is based in local Malian rhythms and rejects the label of blues. He sings mostly in Bamanankan about various topics raging from love to war.

Traoré has been called the father of desert blues, and Bill Frisell, who has covered Traoré's song Baba Drame, has called him "Elvis of Mali".

== Discography ==
- Mariama (1990)
- Kar Kar (1992)
- Les Enfants de Pierrette (1995)
- Sa Golo (1996)
- Maciré (2000)
- Je chanterai pour toi (2003)
- The Best of Boubacar Traoré: The Bluesman from Mali (2003)
- Kongo Magni (2005)
- Mali Denhou (2011)
- Mbalimaou (2014)
- Dounia Tabalo (2017)
- Live! Boubacar Traoré & Vincent Bucher & Jeremie Diarra (2024)
