= Michel Soutter =

Swiss film director (1932–1991)

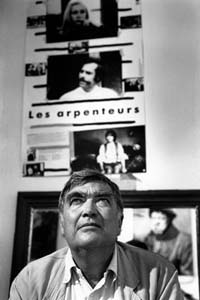
- Soutter in 1990
- Born: 2 June 1932; Geneva, Switzerland
- Died: 9 September 1991 (aged 59); Geneva, Switzerland
- Occupations: Film director Screenwriter
- Years active: 1965–1991

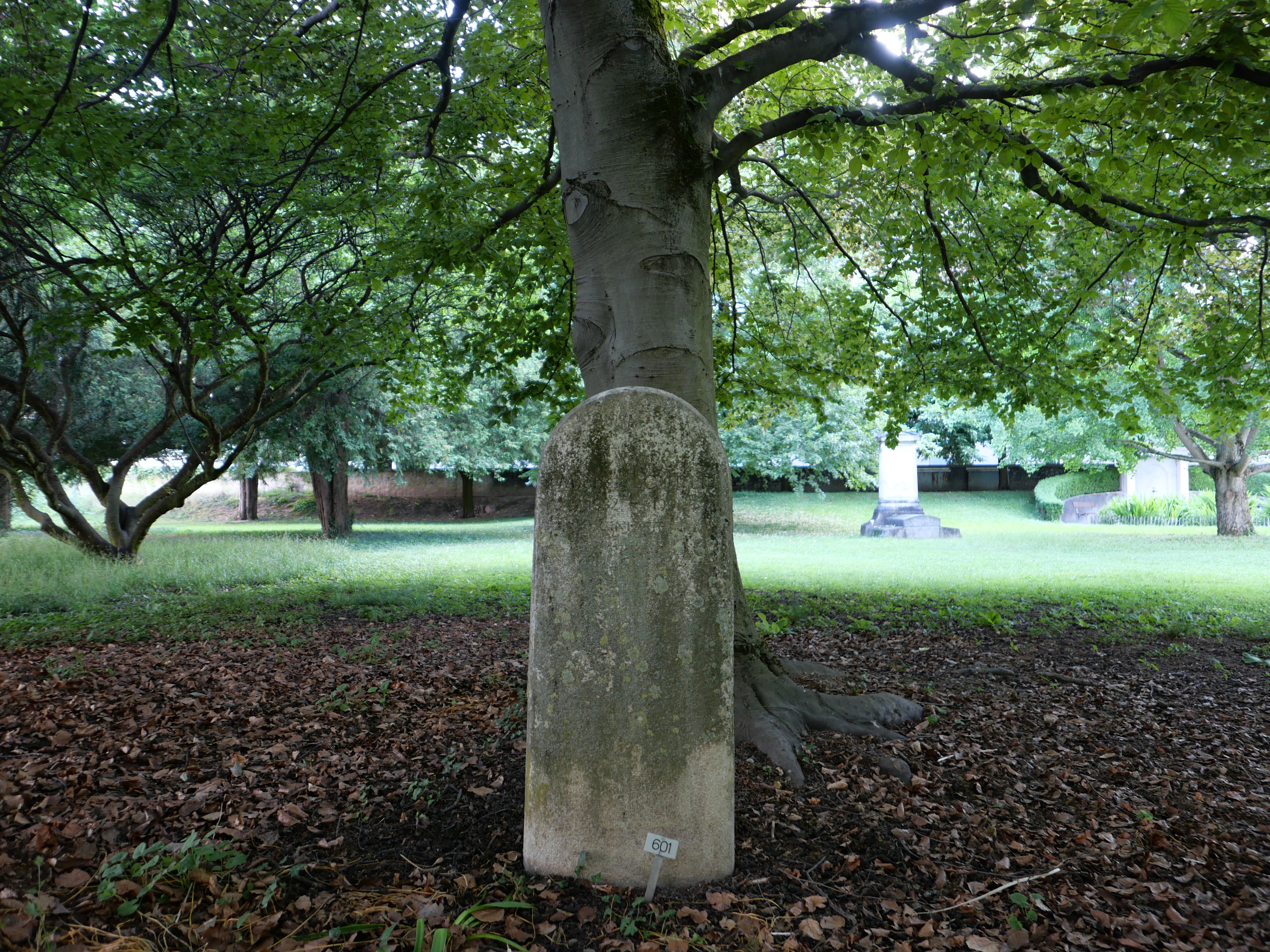
Soutter's grave

Michel Soutter (2 June 1932 – 9 September 1991) was a Swiss film director and screenwriter associated with the New Swiss Cinema. After beginning his career in television, he founded Groupe 5 in 1968 to promote French-language filmmaking in Switzerland. He later served on the Feature Films jury at the 1974 Cannes Film Festival.

== Life and career ==
Michel Soutter was born on 2 June 1932 in Geneva. After leaving Collège Calvin, he spent time in Geneva and Paris, working as a cabaret singer, and decorative painter. He wrote poetry during this period.

A meeting with filmmaker Alain Tanner in 1960 led Soutter into television and cinema. He began working at Télévision Suisse Romande, as an assistant director with Jean-Jacques Lagrange and Claude Goretta, and became a programme director in 1964.

Soutter made television programmes, including biographical profiles and dramas. For television, he later directed a version of Alfred Jarry's Ubu Roi in 1976 and the series Condorcet in 1989.

The French New Wave became an important influence on Soutter's approach to filmmaking. Alongside his television work, he founded Groupe 5 in 1968. The group was intended to promote the production of French-language films in Switzerland.

In 1967, Soutter's first feature film, La Lune avec les dents, was booed at the Locarno Film Festival. Audience members left the screening during the film. The film had been made on a very small budget using methods influenced by documentary and television production, and helped lay the groundwork for New Swiss Cinema.

Soutter's film James ou pas was selected for the Directors' Fortnight at the 1970 Cannes Film Festival. In 1972, Les Arpenteurs represented Switzerland at the Cannes Film Festival and received the Grand Prix at Dinard. In 1974, Soutter served as a member of the Feature Films jury at the Cannes Film Festival. His film L'Escapade (1974) was his first 35 mm colour film. In 1977, he made Repérages, a French-Swiss co-production with a comparatively large budget for his work, starring Jean-Louis Trintignant and Delphine Seyrig.

Soutter died in Geneva on 9 September 1991. In 2004, the documentary Une manière de faire examined Soutter's working methods through film excerpts and interviews with collaborators. A digitally restored version of his 1977 film Repérages was presented at the Locarno Film Festival in 2024 as part of its "Swiss Cinema Rediscovered" programme.

== Selected filmography ==
A selection of Soutter's films as director includes:

- Mick et Arthur (1965)
- La lune avec les dents (1966)
- Haschich (1967)
- La Pomme (1968)
- James ou pas (1970)
- Les Arpenteurs (1971)
- L'Escapade (1974)
- Repérages (1977)
- L'amour des femmes (1981)
- Adam et Eve (1983)
- Signé Renart (1985)
- Condorcet (1989)
- L'homme révolté 1966-1973 (1991)
- Le film du Cinéma Suisse (1991)
