= Messidor (film) =

1979 film

- Directed by: Alain Tanner
- Written by: Alain Tanner
- Starring: Clémentine Amouroux; Catherine Rétoré
- Cinematography: Renato Berta
- Edited by: Brigitte Sousselier
- Distributed by: Gaumont Distribution
- Release date: 1979
- Running time: 130 minutes
- Countries: Switzerland; France
- Language: French

Messidor is a 1979 Swiss-French drama film written and directed by Alain Tanner. It stars Clémentine Amouroux and Catherine Rétoré as two young women travelling across Switzerland. The film premiered in 1979 and was entered in competition at the Berlin International Film Festival. It was later screened at festivals including Solothurn and São Paulo.

== Synopsis ==
Two young women hitchhike across Switzerland. Through the people they encounter along the way, they become increasingly alienated from society and eventually kill a man.

== Cast ==
The cast includes:

- Clémentine Amouroux as Jeanne Salève
- Catherine Rétoré as Marie Corrençon
- Franziskus Abgottspon
- Gerald Battiaz
- René Besson

== Background ==
The film was inspired by travel diaries written by two female hitchhikers during three weeks of wandering in Switzerland. It also grew out of a project initially intended for Maurice Pialat and based on a real French criminal case from the 1970s involving two runaway girls. Tanner took on the project only on the condition that he could rework the original concept around his own concerns, especially the limits of freedom.

== Reception ==
Filmdienst described Messidor as a reflection on futile youth protest and on a society dominated by technology, though it said the story’s broader meaning was weakened by its clichéd distinction between “good” and “bad” characters. SRF wrote that the film was less well received in Switzerland than Tanner’s earlier successes, but described it in retrospect as one of his most radical visions. Swiss Films described it as Tanner’s “most sombre work”, marked by a despair not relieved by his usual humour.

== Festival screenings and restoration ==
Messidor premiered in 1979 and was entered in the main competition at the 29th Berlin International Film Festival. It was later screened at festivals including the Solothurn Film Festival in 1996, the Tofifest International Film Festival in Toruń in 2009, the Cinéma Tous Ecrans festival in Geneva in 2010, the Fünf Seen Film Festival in 2011, and the Mostra Internacional de Cinema de São Paulo in 2017. A 4K digital restoration of the film was screened at the Museum of Modern Art in 2024.
