= Claude Goretta =

Swiss film director and screenwriter (1929–2019)

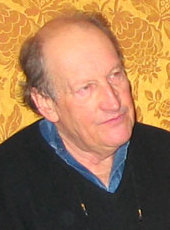
- Born: 23 June 1929; Le Petit-Saconnex, Geneva, Switzerland
- Died: 20 February 2019 (aged 89); Geneva, Switzerland
- Occupations: Film director, screenwriter

Claude Goretta (23 June 1929 – 20 February 2019) was a Swiss film director and screenwriter who was one of the principal figures of the New Swiss Cinema. After co-directing the short film Nice Time (1957) with Alain Tanner, Goretta began working in Swiss television and co-founded Groupe 5 in 1968. His film L’Invitation (1973) won the Jury Prize at the Cannes Film Festival and was nominated for the Academy Award for Best Foreign Language Film. Goretta also worked extensively in television and received lifetime-achievement honours from the Swiss Film Prize in 2010 and the Locarno Film Festival in 2011.

== Biography ==
Claude Goretta was born on 23 June 1929 in Le Petit-Saconnex, now part of Geneva. He studied law at the University of Geneva. In 1952, Goretta joined Alain Tanner in setting up a film club and also worked as a film critic.

Goretta had no formal film training. He spent 1955–56 in London on a placement at the British Film Institute and also worked as an assistant at the National Film Theatre. He also worked in the BFI’s programme planning department. In 1957, Goretta co-directed the short film Nice Time with Tanner. It was made through the BFI Production Board. The film received an award at the Venice Film Festival.

Goretta's collaboration with Tanner on Nice Time has been credited with helping launch the New Swiss Cinema movement. Goretta later said that his time in London and the making of Nice Time shaped his approach to independent filmmaking in French-speaking Switzerland.

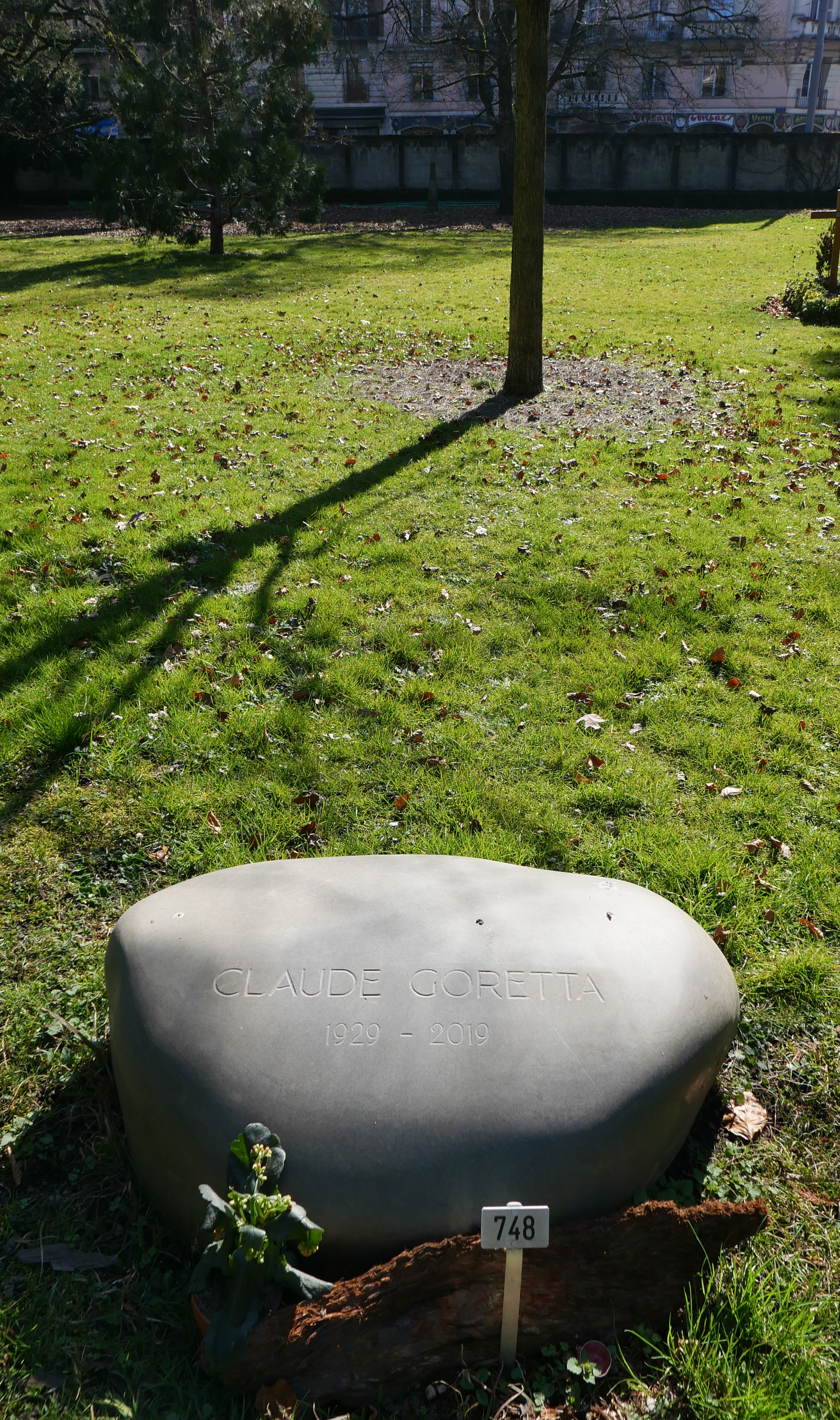
Grave of Claude Goretta at Cimetière des Rois, Geneva

After returning to Switzerland in 1958, Goretta began working as a television producer for French-speaking Swiss television. His early television work included documentaries and reports dealing with social subjects and everyday life.

In 1968, he co-founded Groupe 5 with Alain Tanner, Michel Soutter, Jean-Louis Roy and Jean-Jacques Lagrange. The group developed films in partnership with television. In 1978, Goretta served on the feature-film jury at the Cannes Film Festival. Beginning in 1968, he spent eighteen years based in Paris and also pursued film and television projects in Belgium and Italy. He died in Geneva on 20 February 2019.

== Work ==
Goretta was one of the principal figures of the New Swiss Cinema. His first feature film, Le fou, appeared in 1970. The film failed to secure a distributor, after which Goretta returned to television work. A successful television film, Le Temps d’un Portrait (1972), led him back to cinema. In 1973, L’Invitation won the Jury Prize at the Cannes Film Festival. It was also nominated for the Academy Award for Best Foreign Language Film. The film was based on Michel Viala’s play Les Médiocres, a work that historians and publishers had previously believed to be lost.

Among Goretta's later films shown or honoured at major international festivals, La Dentellière (1977) won the ecumenical jury award at Cannes, while La provinciale (1981) was shown at the Berlin International Film Festival and Si le soleil ne revenait pas (1987) competed at the Venice Film Festival. La Dentellière became Goretta’s biggest audience success and marked an important early stage in Isabelle Huppert’s career. His television work ranged from reportage and documentaries to adaptations and dramatic productions. By the 1990s, he was working mainly for television. His final film was the two-part television production Sartre, l’âge des passions (2006), which combined fiction and documentary.

Goretta often focused on ordinary people and outsiders, especially characters who struggled to communicate or resisted social expectations. In 1998, the Solothurn Film Festival honoured him with a retrospective. His filmography comprised more than fifty cinema, television, documentary and short films. Goretta received the honorary Quartz at the Swiss Film Prize in 2010 and a Leopard at the Locarno Film Festival in 2011 in recognition of his lifetime achievement.

== Selected filmography ==
A selection of Goretta's films as director includes:

- Nice Time (1957), with Alain Tanner
- Jean-Luc persécuté (1966)
- Le fou (1970)
- Le jour des noces (1971)
- The Invitation (1973)
- Le fils prodigue (1974)
- Pas si méchant que ça (1975)
- The Lacemaker (1977)
- La provinciale (1981)
- Les vêpres de la Vierge (1982)
- The Death of Mario Ricci (1983)
- Orfeo (1985)
- Le rapport du gendarme (1986)
- If the Sun Never Returns (1987)
- Les ennemies de la Mafia (1988)
- La fouine (1991)
- Maigret et la grande perche (1991)
- L'Ombre (1992)
- Le Chagrin des Belges (1994)
- Le dernier chant (1996)
- Maigret a peur (1996)
- Le dernier été (1997)
- Vivre avec toi (1997)
- Thérèse et Léon (2001)
- La fuite de Monsieur Monde (2004)
- Sartre, l'âge des passions (2006)
