= Charles, Dead or Alive =

- Directed by: Alain Tanner
- Written by: Alain Tanner
- Starring: François Simon; Marcel Robert; Marie-Claire Dufour
- Cinematography: Renato Berta
- Edited by: Sylvia Bachmann
- Music by: Jacques Olivier
- Production companies: Le Groupe 5 SSR
- Release date: 1969
- Running time: 94 minutes
- Country: Switzerland
- Language: French

Charles, Dead or Alive (French: Charles mort ou vif) is a 1969 Swiss drama film written and directed by Alain Tanner. Starring François Simon, Marcel Robert and Marie-Claire Dufour, it concerns a middle-aged industrialist who tries to break away from his bourgeois life. The film won the Golden Leopard at the 1969 Locarno International Film Festival.

== Synopsis ==
Charles, a 50-year-old industrialist, abandons his comfortable bourgeois way of life to live with a Bohemian couple.

== Cast ==
The cast includes:

- François Simon as Charles Dé
- Marie-Claire Dufour as Adeline
- Marcel Robert as Paul
- André Schmidt as Pierre Dé
- Maya Simon as Marianne Dé

== Production ==
According to Alison Smith, Tanner translated the events of May 1968 in France to a Swiss setting, creating in the film an imagined student revolt in a society that had not experienced the same turmoil or revolutionary possibility.

== Reception ==
=== Awards ===
At the 1969 Locarno International Film Festival, the film won the Golden Leopard.

=== Critical response ===
Filmdienst described the film as a convincing exploration of a life crisis and, at the same time, a bitter portrait of Swiss reality. Variety noted that Tanner’s first feature, Charles, Dead or Alive, won Locarno’s top prize in 1969. Swissinfo wrote that it marked the first time New Swiss Cinema received international attention, and described it as launching “politically shaped Swiss auteur cinema”.

== Festival screenings ==
The film premiered in 1969. In later years, it was screened at festivals including the Ankara International Film Festival in 1998, the Solothurner Filmtage in 2015, the 72nd Locarno Film Festival in 2019, Cineuropa 35 in Santiago de Compostela in 2021, and the 51st Telluride Film Festival in 2024.
