= In the White City =

1983 film

In the White City (Dans la ville blanche)
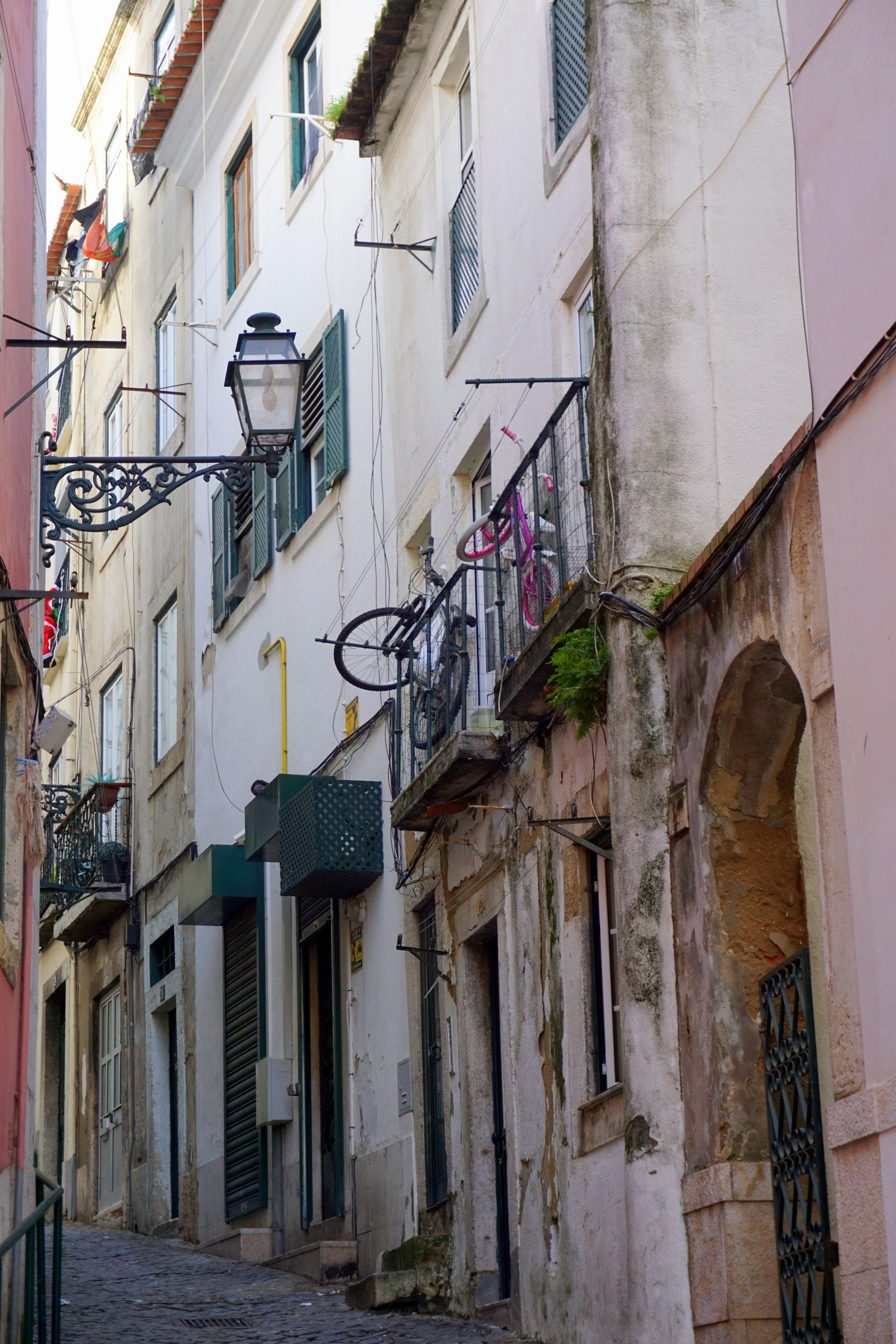
- Narrow street in Old Lisbon
- Directed by: Alain Tanner
- Written by: Alain Tanner
- Produced by: Paulo Branco; Alain Tanner; António Vaz da Silva
- Starring: Bruno Ganz
- Cinematography: Acácio de Almeida
- Edited by: Laurent Uhler
- Release date: 20 April 1983
- Running time: 108 minutes
- Country: Switzerland
- Languages: French; German; Portuguese

In the White City (French: Dans la ville blanche) is a 1983 Swiss drama film directed by Alain Tanner. Focusing on a mariner's disillusion with life at sea, it addresses the problems with dropping out of society, one of the central topics in Tanner's films.

== Synopsis ==
Paul, an engineer on an oil tanker, becomes tired of the noisy engine room, calling the ship "a floating factory of crazy people." During a stopover in Lisbon, he settles in a small bar-hotel; and when the departure date arrives, he opts to jump ship and stay in "the White City". He sends 8 mm films and letters about his travels to his bemused Swiss girlfriend, Élisa, who stays at home. Meanwhile, Paul flirts with Rosa, the hotel's bartender and chambermaid, and they quickly become lovers. Paul continues to write to Élisa describing the whiteness of the city, the solitude and the silence. Though she regards them with ennui, she becomes hurt and angry, and she sends him an ultimatum. Paul merely meanders through Lisbon where his purpose in life appears to become directionless. He eventually loses contact with Rosa, and the film ends with Paul in a state of "nothingness".

== Reception ==
The film was entered into the 33rd Berlin International Film Festival. The film was selected as the Swiss entry for the Best Foreign Language Film at the 56th Academy Awards, but was not accepted as a nominee.

The New York Times critic Vincent Canby writes "It's a very reflective, literary film. Though there isn't much dialogue in it, its concerns are the sort that less frequently turn up on the screen than in written fiction, where interior voyages of discovery can be charted more easily in words than in images, even images as rich as Mr. Tanner's".

Frederic & Mary Ann Brussat describe the film as "a movie about alienation, self-discovery, and time".

== Cast ==
- Bruno Ganz as Paul
- Teresa Madruga as Rosa
- Julia Vonderlinn as Élisa / The Swiss woman
- José Carvalho as Le patron
- Francisco Baião as Le voleur au couteau
- José Wallenstein as L'autre voleur
- Victor Costa as Le garçon du bar
- Lídia Franco as La fille du bar
- Pedro Efe as L'ami dans la taverne
- Cecília Guimarães as La dame du train
- Joana Vicente as La jeune fille du train

== See also ==
- List of submissions to the 56th Academy Awards for Best Foreign Language Film
- List of Swiss submissions for the Academy Award for Best Foreign Language Film
