= The Thief of Paris =

- American poster for The Thief of Paris
- Directed by: Louis Malle
- Written by: Jean-Claude Carrière; Louis Malle
- Produced by: Georges Laurent; J.F. Malle; Alain Quefféléan
- Starring: Jean-Paul Belmondo; Geneviève Bujold
- Cinematography: Henri Lanoë
- Edited by: Jacques Saulnier
- Music by: Henri Lanoë
- Production companies: Nouvelles Éditions de Films; Les Productions Artistes Associés; Compagnia Cinematografica Champion
- Distributed by: Les Artistes Associés
- Release date: 22 February 1967
- Running time: 121 minutes
- Country: France
- Language: French
- Box office: $9.2 million 1,225,555 admissions (France)

The Thief of Paris (Le voleur) is a 1967 French film directed by Louis Malle and starring Jean-Paul Belmondo as a professional thief (Georges Randal) at the turn of the century in Paris. The film, which combines a comedy drama atmosphere with a criminal setting, is based on a book of the same title by Georges Darien.

The story centers on his burglaries as well as his ongoing relationship with his cousin Charlotte (Geneviève Bujold). It also features other well-known French actors including Marie Dubois, Charles Denner and Bernadette Lafont. The film had 1,225,555 admissions in France. It was entered into the 5th Moscow International Film Festival.

== Plot ==
In the opening scene, Georges Randal, the titular thief, breaks into a big house and begins to steal the valuable objects on display. A series of flashbacks (with occasional reversions to the present) then narrates the story of Randal's life. As an orphan, he is raised by his uncle along with his cousin Charlotte, who grows into an attractive young woman with whom he falls in love. When Georges reaches twenty-one and asks for the money his parents left him, he finds that his unscrupulous uncle has misappropriated the money, claiming to have lost it in poor investements. He is rejected as a suitor for Charlotte because he is now poor. She is then betrothed by her social-climbing father to a dim-witted aristocrat. Georges steals her fiance's family jewels. Charlotte intuitively knows the identity of the thief, but says nothing. Her future husband's family having been ruined by the theft, Charlotte's engagement is broken off by her father.

From then on, motivated by a sense of justice and desire for revenge, Randal follows a successful career as a gentleman thief, targeting the haute bourgeoisie. Along the way, he associates with Roger-La-Honte, a more experienced burglar who teaches him the trade, and Abbot La Margelle, a well-connected clergyman who doubles as a con man and criminal mastermind. At the same time, he continues to navigate in bourgeois circles—including an old friend, Mouratet, who has become an assistant to a member of parliament, Courbassol. Mouratet offers to introduce Randal into political circles, unaware that Randal is a criminal and that his own wife is Randal's occasional lover and accomplice.

As his aging uncle spends his time in the company of courtesans, Randal arranges for another of his own mistresses and accomplices, Geneviève, to become the uncle's permanent companion. Randal continues to commit burglaries with Roger, but the latter eventually grows tired of the danger and decides to retire.

Randal travels to Normandy along with Mouratet and Courbassol. There, he is tasked by his accomplices to find Cannonier, a veteran thief who has escaped from jail in Guiana, and warn him against returning to Paris where the police are waiting for him. Randal meets Cannonier, who tells him that in prison he discovered anarchist ideas, and that he wants to take part in the revolutionary struggle. Together, they rob hotel guests. But shortly afterward, Cannonier is recognized and shot dead by a police officer.

Randal's uncle suffers a stroke. As he lies dying, Randal robs him with the Abbot's help and falsifies his will—which was intended to disinherit both him and Charlotte—making them the heirs once again.

At the end of the film, Randal has achieved all his aims: he is married to Charlotte, is living in his uncle's house, and has recovered the money his parents left him, as well as having accumulated a fortune through his crimes. Charlotte says to him, 'You don't need to steal anymore', but he replies, 'You don't understand!'. He has a compulsion to go on, knowing that he will eventually be caught and that, despite Charlotte’s presence, he remains alone. The final scene shows him boarding the train back to Paris with the haul from his latest robbery.

== Cast ==
- Jean-Paul Belmondo as Georges Randal
- Geneviève Bujold as Charlotte Randal
- Christian Lude as Urbain Randal, uncle of Georges and father of Charlotte
- Marie Dubois as Geneviève Delpiels
- Julien Guiomar as Abbot Félix La Margelle
- Paul Le Person as Roger Voisin a.k.a. Roger-La-Honte
- Marlène Jobert as Broussaille, sister of Roger-La-Honte
- Françoise Fabian as Ida
- Bernadette Lafont as Marguerite
- Roger Crouzet as Mouratet
- Martine Sarcey as Renée Mouratet
- Jacques Debary as Courbassol
- Charles Denner as Cannonier
