= The Salamander (1971 film) =

1971 film

- DVD cover
- Directed by: Alain Tanner
- Written by: Alain Tanner; John Berger
- Produced by: Alain Tanner
- Starring: Bulle Ogier; Jean-Luc Bideau
- Cinematography: Sandro Bernardoni; Renato Berta
- Edited by: Marc Blavet; Brigitte Sousselier
- Music by: Patrick Moraz
- Release date: 1971
- Running time: 130 minutes
- Country: Switzerland
- Language: French

The Salamander (French: La Salamandre) is a 1971 Swiss drama film directed by Alain Tanner and written by Tanner and John Berger. It centres on a young woman whose case becomes the basis for a screenplay investigation. Starring Bulle Ogier and Jean-Luc Bideau, it was selected as the Swiss entry for the Best Foreign Language Film at the 45th Academy Awards, and screened at the Cannes Film Festival and the Berlin International Film Festival in 1971.

== Synopsis ==
Rosemonde, known as the Salamander, is a young woman suspected of attempting to kill the uncle with whom she lives. A journalist and a writer are asked to write a screenplay about the case, but fail as Rosemonde resists their efforts to understand her.

== Cast ==
The cast includes:

- Bulle Ogier as Rosemonde
- Jean-Luc Bideau as Pierre
- Jacques Denis as Paul
- Véronique Alain as Suzanne
- Daniel Stuffel as the boss at the shoe shop

== Production ==
Tanner drew on his experience as a journalist and reporter for Swiss television between 1965 and 1968 in developing the film.

== Reception ==
=== Awards and nominations ===
The film was selected as the Swiss entry for the Best Foreign Language Film at the 45th Academy Awards, but was not nominated. It also received an OCIC Award recommendation at the 1971 Berlin International Film Festival, where it was screened in the Forum section.

=== Critical response ===
Filmdienst characterised the film as an intelligent, humorous and poetic exploration of identity and of the relationship between the artist and reality. Swissinfo described the film as playful, humorous and idiosyncratic, and as an enduringly modern film about a free-spirited woman and the art of storytelling. MoMA described the film as a “still underappreciated” work “about ways of seeing and the slipperiness of truth”.

== Festival screenings ==
The film premiered in 1971 and was presented in the Directors’ Fortnight at the 1971 Cannes Film Festival. In later years, it was screened at festivals including the Solothurner Filmtage in 2013, the 68th Locarno Film Festival in 2015, the 41st Mostra Internacional de Cinema de São Paulo in 2017, Festival Lumière 2021 in Lyon, and the 16th Festival du Film Francophone d’Angoulême in 2023. The Museum of Modern Art screened a 4K digital restoration of the film in 2024.

== See also ==
- List of submissions to the 45th Academy Awards for Best Foreign Language Film
- List of Swiss submissions for the Academy Award for Best Foreign Language Film
