= Alain Tanner =

Swiss film director (1929–2022)

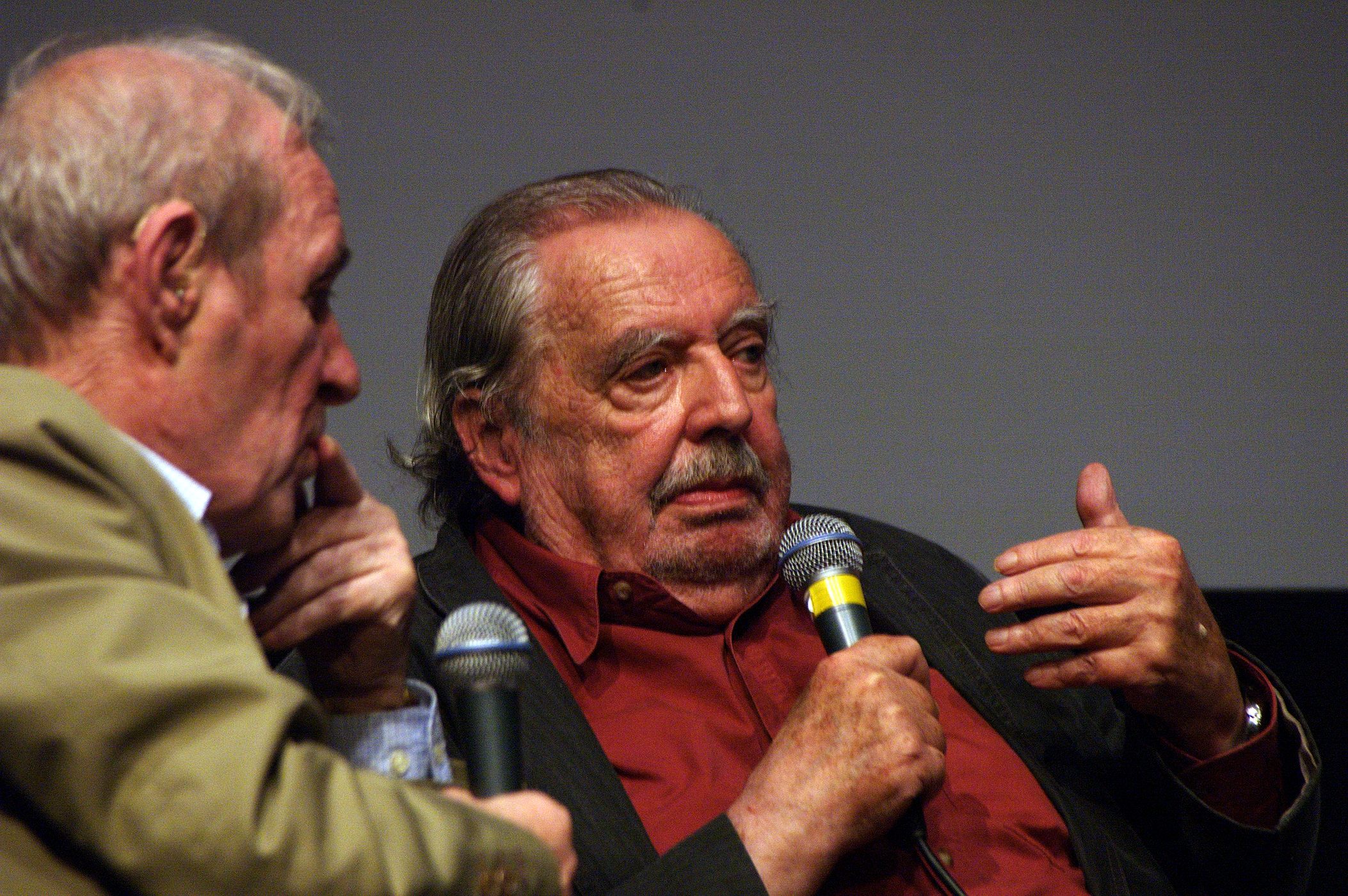
- Born: 6 December 1929; Geneva, Switzerland
- Died: 11 September 2022 (aged 92); Geneva, Switzerland
- Occupation: Filmmaker
- Years active: 1957–2012
- Spouse: Janine
- Children: 2
- Website: alaintanner.ch

Alain Tanner (6 December 1929 – 11 September 2022) was a Swiss film director.

== Early years and education ==
Tanner was born in Geneva, and studied economics at the University of Geneva. In 1951, he joined the film club which Claude Goretta had recently established at the university. After his graduation and a short time working for international shipping companies in London, he continued feeling drawn to film.

== Film career ==
Tanner found work at the British Film Institute in 1955, subtitling, translating, and organizing the archive. His first film, Nice Time (1957), a short documentary film about Piccadilly Circus during weekend evenings, was made with Claude Goretta. Produced by the British Film Institute Experimental Film Fund, it was first shown as part of the third Free Cinema programme at the National Film Theatre in May 1957. The debut film won a prize at the film festival in Venice and much critical praise.

Tanner went to France for a while where he assisted with several commercial films. There, he met some of the most important directors of the French New Wave in Paris as well as Henri Langlois, the director of the Cinémathèque Française. But the atmosphere in the film circles of Paris displeased him; he described it as "cutthroat."

Between 1960 and 1968, Tanner returned to Switzerland, and he made more than 40 films as well as documentaries for French-language television there. In 1962, he became the co-founder of the Swiss young filmmakers' "Groupe Cinque."

His first feature film, Charles, Dead or Alive (1969), won the first prize at the international film festival in Locarno. His next two films, La Salamandre (1971) and Jonah Who Will Be 25 in the Year 2000 (1976), were made in close collaboration with the art critic and novelist John Berger, who had also worked with him, to a lesser degree and without a credit, on the writing of Charles.

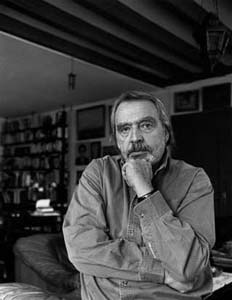
Tanner in 1993

Influenced by his involvement with the British Free Cinema movement in London and with the French New Wave during his years in Paris, Tanner is best known for his movies Jonas qui aura 25 ans en l'an 2000 (Jonah Who Will Be 25 in the Year 2000), Messidor and Dans la ville blanche (In the White City). Dans la ville blanche, starring Bruno Ganz and shot in Lisbon, was entered into the 33rd Berlin International Film Festival.

Light Years Away, his only English language film shot in Ireland, won the Grand Prix Prize at the 1981 Cannes Film Festival.

== Personal life and death ==
Tanner and his wife, Janine, had two children. He died at a hospital in Geneva on 11 September 2022, aged 92.

== Filmography ==
- Nice Time - 1957
- Ramuz, passage d'un poète - 1961
- L'École - 1962
- The Apprentices (Les Apprentis) - 1964
- A City at Chandigarh (Une ville à Chandigarh) - 1966
- Docteur B., médecin de campagne - 1968
- Charles, Dead or Alive (Charles mort ou vif) - 1969
- The Salamander (La Salamandre) - 1971
- Return from Africa (Le Retour d'Afrique) - 1972
- The Middle of the World (Le Milieu du monde) - 1974
- Jonah Who Will Be 25 in the Year 2000 (Jonas qui aura 25 ans en l'an 2000) - 1976
- Messidor - 1979
- Light Years Away (Les Années lumière) - 1981
- In the White City (Dans la ville blanche) - 1983
- No Man's Land - 1985
- A Flame in My Heart (Une flamme dans mon cœur) - 1987
- The Ghost Valley (La vallée fantôme) - 1987
- The Woman from Rose Hill (La Femme de Rose Hill) - 1989
- The Man Who Lost His Shadow (L'Homme qui a perdu son ombre) - 1991
- The Diary of Lady M (Le journal de Lady M) - 1993
- Men of the Port (Les Hommes du port) - 1995
- Fourbi - 1996
- Requiem - 1998
- Jonah and Lila, Till Tomorrow (Jonas et Lila, à demain) - 1999
- Fleurs de sang - 2002
- Paul s'en va - 2004
