= List of compositions by Gerardo Gandini =

A list of compositions by Gerardo Gandini.

== Opera ==
- La ciudad ausente (The Absent City) (1995), libretto by Ricardo Piglia, an opera in two acts, for soprano, coloratura soprano, mezzo-soprano, contralto, baritone, tenor buffo, tenor, bass, baritone, a group of six sopranos and orchestra – (120’)
- Liederkreis (An opera about Schumann) (2000), libretto by Alejandro Tantanian.
- La pasión de Buster Keaton (The Passion of Buster Keaton) (1970/78), libretto by Rafael Alberti, one-act chamber opera for baritone, chamber ensemble, jazz quintet, puppets and tape – (70’)
- Testimonio de María Schumann (Testimonial by María Schumann) (1985), chamber opera for actress (soprano), piano and tape.
- Espejismos II (La muerte y la doncella) (Mirages II (Death and the Maiden)) (1987), chamber opera for two sopranos, two mezzo-sopranos, two dancers and chamber ensemble – (60’)
- La casa sin sosiego (The Restless House) (1992), libretto by Griselda Gambaro, chamber opera in six scenes for two sopranos, two mezzo-sopranos, contralto, tenor, six actors and chamber orchestra – (100’)

== Orchestra ==
- Variations for orchestra (1962), for harp, piano, percussion, timpani, celesta, xylophone, glockenspiel, vibraphone and strings – (16')
- Cadencias II (1967), for harp, piano, percussion, strings – (6')
- Laberynthus Johannes (1973), for orchestra divided in three groups: harpsichord, harp, marimba, piano, xylophone, tenor saxophone, drums, percussion and strings – (15')
- Soria moria (1974), for string orchestra made up of four solo violins, a string quartet and a string trio (viola, violoncello and double bass) – (8')
- ... E sarà (1976), five pieces for orchestra, for english horn, harp, percussion, solo violin and strings – (20')
  - Homenaje a Girolamo Frescobaldi
  - Círculos sobre "L'enharmonique"
  - Planh
  - Sarabande et Double
  - Homenaje a Domenico Scarlatti
- Eusebius (1984-85), five nocturnes for orchestra divided in four groups: Group A: percussion, celesta, harp, strings; Group B: strings s/b.; Group C: strings; and Group D: percussion, piano, strings – (12')
- Música ficción III (1990), three pieces for chamber orchestra, for voice, percussion, piano, celesta, harmonica and strings – (12’)
  - Neobarroco
  - Pasos (en la nieve)
  - Reescritura y continuación de una pieza de Arnold Schoenberg
- Mozartvariationen (1991) for voice, percussion, piano and strings – (15’)
- Estudios para descripción de la luna (Studies for a depiction of the moon) (1993), for chamber orchestra, percussion and piano – (12')

== Soloists and Orchestra ==
- Cadencias I (1966), for violin and chamber orchestra – (15’)
- Contrastes (1968), for 2 pianos and orchestra – (18’)
- Fases (1969), for clarinet and orchestra – (14’)
- Fantaisie - Impromptu (1970) - for piano and orchestra – (15’)
- Tropos (1973), for trombone, choir and orchestra – (18’)
- Los Caprichos (1975-77), for guitar and orchestra – (16’)
- Concert for viola and orchestra (1979) – (20’)
- Concert for piano and Orquesta (1980) – (25’)
- Concierto del Fandango (Boccherini - Gandini) (1973), for guitar and orchestra – (20’)
- Balada (1983), for oboe, violin and 2 string groups – (6’)
- RSCH: Escenas (1984), for piano and orchestra – (20’)
- Concert for flute, guitar and orchestra (1984-86) – (25’)
- Artificios (1986), for piano and string orchestra – (15’)
- Imaginary Landscape (1988), for piano and orchestra – (31’)

== Chamber Music ==
- Concertino (1960), for clarinet and instruments (string trio, piano, celesta and percussion) – (16')
- Concertino III (1963), for harpsichord and instruments (flute, oboe, clarinet, string trio and percussion) – (13')
- Pequeña música para Mauricio (1963), for 15 instruments (flute, oboe, clarinet, trumpet, french horn, trombone, solo piano, percussion and strings) – (6')
- Música nocturna I (1964), for flute, string trio and piano – (5')
- ...hecha sombra y altura (1965), for flute, clarinet, string trio, piano and percussion – (7')
- ...l'adieu (1966), for piano and two percussionists – (6')
- ...fuggevole (1967), for 6 instruments (flute, piccolo, bass clarinet, violin, piano and percussion) – (5')
- Piagne and sospira (1969), for flute, clarinet, violin and piano – (5')
- Il concertino (1971), for flute and instruments (clarinet, violin, double bass, piano, pump organ and percussion) – (20')
- Double (1971), for wind quintet – (5')
- Lamento de Tristano (1975), for one or two pianos and instrumental echo ad lib. – (7')
- Representaciones (1975), for voice and instruments (flute, clarinet, violin, viola, double bass, piano and percussion) – (15')
- A cow in a Mondrian painting (1975), for 2 flutes – (5')
- Música nocturna IV (1977), for guitar and string quartet – (20')
- Trioneiron (1980), for clarinet, viola and piano – (6')
- Dos versiones (1981), for string quartet – (6')
- Soliloquio sobre paisaje triste (1983), for oboe, viola, double bass and piano – (8')
- Los adioses (1983), for piano, percussion and mechanical instruments – (10')
- JSB: Quodlibet (1983), for flute, clarinet, piano and percussion – (10')
- Berceuse (1984), for violin, violoncello and piano – (8')
- RSCH: Testimonios (1984), for voice, piano and tape – (35')
- Espejismos (1985), for voice, flute, string trio, piano and percussion – (18')
- Lunario sentimental (1989), for violin, violoncello and piano – (15')
- Escuchando Pierrot chez Mme Ocampo (1993), for four percussionists.
- In Memoriam Tomás Tichauer (1996), for alto flute, 2 violins, 2 violas, 2 violoncelli, double bass, piano.
- Subtangos (1997), for piano and brass quintet.
- Sobre un canto de Luigi Nono (1997), for piano, clarinet and string quartet – (20’)

== Two Instruments ==
- Fantasía (1967), for clarinet and piano – (6’)
- La serenata interrumpida (1972), for flute and piano – (5’)
- In-Promptu (1975), for flute and piano – (5’)
- Oneiron (1978), for viola and piano – (6’)
- Four pieces (1978), for flute and guitar – (10’)
- Estudios I - V (1990), for violin and piano – (12’)

== Piano ==
- Tres pequeñas elegías (1959) – (4’)
- Cuatro bagatelas (1962) – (4’)
- ... E sarà, five pieces (1974) – (15’)
- Siete preludios (1977) – (14’)
- Música ficción, 3 pieces (1980) – (15’)
- Cuaderno de canciones (1980) – (20’)
- Eusebius, four nocturnes for piano or a nocturne for four pianos (1984) – (8’)
- Berceuse (1984) – (5’)
- RSCH: Elegía (1986) – (6’)
- Diario 1960/87 (1988) – (50’)
- Rondando a la menor (1991), for two pianos – (10’)
- Diario 1987/91 (1991) – (20’)
- Tres tristes (1994) – (6’)
- Diario IV: Verano 1994/95 (1995) – (15’)
- Anatomía de la melancolía – Sonata I (1995/96)
- Anatomía de la melancolía – Sonata II (1998)
- Anatomía de la melancolía – Sonata III (2001)
- Anatomía de la melancolía – Sonata IV (2004)
- Anatomía de la melancolía – Sonata V (2005)
- Anatomía de la melancolía – Sonata VI (2006)

== Solo Instruments ==
- Los caprichos (1975), for guitar and recorded guitar – (15’)
- Seis tientos (1977), for guitar – (12’)
- Sol-Oneiron (1980), for clarinet – (5’)
- Soliloquio (1982), for oboe – (4’)
- Arnold Strikes Again (Estudio para Espejismos) (1985), for flute – (4’)
- Viejos ritos (Estudio para Espejismos) (1985), for percussion – (6’)
- Hani-Ramaprah (I) (1990), for harp – (4’)
- Hani-Ramaprah (II) (1990), for alto flute – (4’)

== Voice and Instruments ==
- Poemas de Quasimodo (1963), for voice, clarinet, viola, harp and celesta – (10’)
- Canciones de Lorca (1976), for voice and guitar – (12’)
- Siete versiones de un canto (1981), for (1) voice, flute, piccolo, viola, guitar, harp and vibraphone, or for (2) voice, flute, clarinet, violin, viola, violoncello and guitar – (18’)
- Tanka (1975-84), for voice and piano – (3’)
- Prespejismos (Estudios para Espejismos) (1985), for voice and piano – (4’)
- Los pequeños cantos (1987), for voice and piano – (7’)
- Los pequeños cantos (1988), for voice, clarinet, violin, violoncello and piano – (8’)
- Pessoa: Tres fragmentos (1997), for baritone, clarinet and piano – (10’)

== Choir ==
- Los proverbios (Choir from La pasión de Buster Keaton) (1973) – (8’)
- Laberinto III (1975) – (15’)

== Film Music ==
- Allá lejos y hace tiempo (Far Away and Long Ago) (1978) dir. Manuel Antin
- La nube (The Cloud) (1998) dir. Pino Solanas
- Vidas privadas (Private Lives) (2001) dir. Fito Páez
- Memoria del saqueo (Social Genocide) (2004) dir. Pino Solanas
- Esas cuatro notas (Those four notes) (2004) dir. Rafael Filippelli
- La dignidad de los nadies (The Dignity of the Nobodies) (2005) dir. Pino Solanas
- Argentina latente (2007) dir. Pino Solanas
- La próxima estación (The Next Station) (2008) dir. Pino Solanas

== Bibliography ==
- Lambertini, Marta. "Gerardo Gandini. Obras", Diccionario de la Música Española e Hispanoamericana (E. Casares ed. Madrid, SGAE, 1999-2000), Vol. V, p. 368. ISBN 8480483083
- Gandini, Gerardo. Catálogo de obras editadas. Buenos Aires, Ricordi, s/f. (not before 1991) Biography (Spanish, English) and List of Works, 9 p.
- Fessel, Pablo. Inventario de manuscritos musicales del Fondo Gerardo Gandini (Biblioteca Nacional) 1a. ed. Buenos Aires: Biblioteca Nacional, 2015. 200 p. ISMN 979-0-9016798-2-5
- Mondolo, Ana María. "Anexo III: Catálogo de obras", in Marta Lambertini: "Gerardo Gandini - Música ficción" (Madrid, SGAE, 2008), pp. 187-224.
