= 1992 Cannes Film Festival =

- Official poster of the 45th Cannes Film Festival, featuring a portrait of German actress Marlene Dietrich by Don English.
- Opening film: Basic Instinct
- Closing film: Far and Away
- Location: Cannes, France
- Founded: 1946
- Awards: Palme d'Or: The Best Intentions
- No. of films: 21 (In Competition)
- Festival date: 7 May 1992 – 18 May 1992
- Website: festival-cannes.com/en

Cannes Film Festival
- 1993 1991

The 45th Cannes Film Festival took place from 7 to 18 May 1992. French actor Gérard Depardieu served as jury president for the main competition.

Swedish filmmaker Bille August won the Palme d'Or, the festival's top prize, for a second time with the drama-film The Best Intentions.

The festival opened with Basic Instinct by Paul Verhoeven, and closed with Far and Away by Ron Howard.

== Juries ==
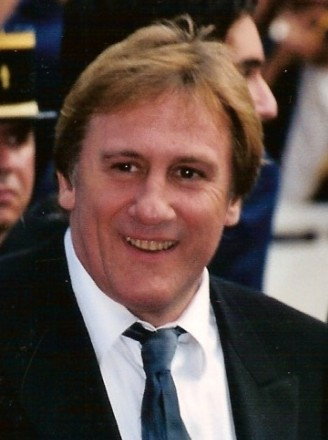
Gérard Depardieu, Jury President

=== Main competition ===
- Gérard Depardieu, French actor - Jury President
- Pedro Almodóvar, Spanish filmmaker
- John Boorman, British filmmaker
- René Cleitman, French
- Jamie Lee Curtis, American actress
- Carlo Di Palma, Italian cinematographer
- Nana Jorjadze, Georgian filmmaker
- Lester James Peries, Sri Lankan filmmaker
- Serge Toubiana, French
- Joële Van Effenterre, French

=== Camera d'Or ===
- André Delvaux, Belgian filmmaker - Jury President
- Olivier Bauer, French actor
- Gian Piero Brunetta, Italian journalist
- Pierre Favre, French film critic
- Richard Hasselmann, French cinephile
- João Lopes, Portuguese journalist
- David Meeker, British foreign delegate
- Gérard Mordillat, French director

== Official selection ==
=== In Competition ===
The following feature films competed for the Palme d'Or:

English title	Original title	Director(s)	Production country
A Stranger Among Us		Sidney Lumet	United States
Basic Instinct (opening film)		Paul Verhoeven	United States, United Kingdom, France
The Best Intentions	Den goda viljan	Bille August	Sweden
Crush		Alison Maclean	New Zealand
Dark at Noon	L'Œil qui ment	Raúl Ruiz	Portugal, France
Dream of Light	El sol del membrillo	Víctor Erice	Spain
In the Country of Juliets	Au pays des Juliets	Mehdi Charef	France
An Independent Life	Самостоятельная жизнь	Vitali Kanevsky	Russia
The Journey	El viaje	Fernando Solanas	Argentina
Howards End		James Ivory	United Kingdom, United States, Japan
Hyenas	Hyènes	Djibril Diop Mambéty	Senegal
The Sentinel	La sentinelle	Arnaud Desplechin	France
The Long Day Closes		Terence Davies	United Kingdom
Luna Park	Луна-парк	Pavel Lungin	France, Russia
Léolo		Jean-Claude Lauzon	Canada
Of Mice and Men		Gary Sinise	United States
The Player		Robert Altman	United States
The Return of Casanova	Le Retour de Casanova	Édouard Niermans	France
Simple Men		Hal Hartley	United States
The Stolen Children	Il ladro di bambini	Gianni Amelio	Italy
Twin Peaks: Fire Walk with Me		David Lynch	France, United States

=== Un Certain Regard ===
The following films were selected for the Un Certain Regard section:

English title	Original title	Director(s)	Production country
American Me		Edward James Olmos	United States
And Life Goes On	زندگی و دیگر هیچ	Abbas Kiarostami	Iran
Apple Trees	Apfelbäume	Helma Sanders-Brahms	Germany
The Arrival of Averill	Averills Ankommen	Michael Schottenberg	Austria
Bad Lieutenant		Abel Ferrara	United States
Being at Home with Claude		Jean Beaudin	Canada
The Blue Eyes of Yonta	Udju Azul di Yonta	Flora Gomes	Portugal, Guinea-Bissau
The Chekist	Чекист	Aleksandr Rogozhkin	France, Russia
Cousin Bobby		Jonathan Demme	United States
Crystal Nights	Κρυστάλλινες νύχτες	Tonia Marketaki	Greece
Happy Days	Счастливые дни	Aleksei Balabanov	Soviet Union
Memory of Water	La memoria del agua	Héctor Fáver	Spain, Argentina
Modern Crimes		Alejandro Agresti	Netherlands, Argentina
Mon Desir		Nicky Marshall	New Zealand
The Ox	Oxen	Sven Nykvist	Sweden
Prague		Ian Sellar	United Kingdom
Strictly Ballroom		Baz Luhrmann	Australia
The Summer Guest	A nyaraló	Can Togay	Hungary
Through an Open Window		Eric Mendelsohn	United States
Wedding Night – End of the Song	Hochzaeitsnuecht	Pol Cruchten	Luxembourg

=== Out of Competition ===
The following films were selected to be screened out of competition:

English title	Original title	Director(s)	Production country
As in Heaven	Svo á jörðu sem á himni	Kristín Jóhannesdóttir	Iceland
Le batteur du Boléro (short)		Patrice Leconte	France
Beauty and the Beast		Gary Trousdale and Kirk Wise	United States
The Boys from St. Petri	Drengene fra Sankt Petri	Søren Kragh-Jacobsen	Denmark
Far and Away (closing film)		Ron Howard	United States
House of Angels	Änglagård	Colin Nutley	Sweden, Denmark, Norway
Map of the Human Heart		Vincent Ward	Australia, Canada, France, United Kingdom
The Oak	Balanța	Lucian Pintilie	Romania
Opening Night (1977)		John Cassavetes	United States
Othello (1951)	The Tragedy of Othello: The Moor of Venice	Orson Welles	Italy, Morocco
Pather Panchali (1955)		Satyajit Ray	India
Patrick Dewaere		Marc Esposito	France
Reservoir Dogs		Quentin Tarantino	United States
Sarafina!		Darrell Roodt	United States, South Africa, United Kingdom, France
The Warrior's Heart	Krigerens hjerte	Leidulv Risan	Norway

=== Short Films Competition ===
The following short films competed for the Short Film Palme d'Or:

- Az út by Nikolai Ivanov Neikov
- Cheating, Inc. by William Lorton
- Daumier's Law by Geoff Dunbar
- L'échange by Vincent Pérez
- Encolure 42 by Willy Kempeneers
- Ghalb by Sa'ied Mojaveri
- Keine besonderen Vorkommnisse by Jürgen Schönhoff
- Le métro by Catherine Montondo
- No Problem by Craig Welch
- Omnibus by Sam Karmann
- A Passion Play by Tony Twigg
- La sensation by Manuel Poutte

== Parallel sections ==
=== International Critics' Week ===
The following films were screened for the 31st International Critics' Week (31e Semaine de la Critique):

Feature film competition

- Adorable Lies (Adorables mentiras) by Gerardo Chijona (Cuba)
- Anmonaito no sasayaki wo kiita by Isao Yamada (Japan)
- Archipiélago by Pablo Perelman (Chile)
- Die flucht by David Rühm (Austria)
- The Grocer’s Wife by John Pozer (Canada)
- Ingalo by Asdis Thorrodsen (Iceland)
- Man Bites Dog (C’est arrivé près de chez vous) by Rémy Belvaux, André Bonzel, Benoît Poelvoorde (Belgium)

Short film competition

- Floating by Richard Heslop (United Kingdom)
- Home Stories by Matthias Müller (Germany)
- Les Marionnettes by Marc Chevrie (France)
- Le Petit chat est mort by Fejria Deliba (France)
- Revolver by Chester Dent (United Kingdom)
- The Room by Jeff Balsmeyer (United States)
- Sprickan by Kristian Petri (Sweden)

=== Directors' Fortnight ===
The following films were screened for the 1992 Directors' Fortnight (Quinzaine des Réalizateurs):

- Am Ende der Nacht by Christoph Schaub
- Le Amiche del cuore by Michele Placido
- Angel of Fire (Angel de fuego) by Dana Rotberg
- Archipel by Pierre Granier-Deferre
- Baduk by Majid Majidi
- Benny’s Video by Michael Haneke
- Bob Roberts by Tim Robbins
- Les contes sauvages by Gérald Calderon, Jean-Charles Cuttoli
- Coupable d’innocence by Marcin Ziębiński
- Don Quijote by Orson Welles, Jesús Franco
- Dust of Angels by Hsu Hsiao-ming
- Eux by Levan Zakareishvili
- Hay Que Zurrar A Los Pobres by Santiago San Miguel
- Love at First Sight by Rudolf Thome
- Love (Lyubov) by Valery Todorovsky
- Mac by John Turturro
- My New Gun by Stacy Cochran
- Otrazheniye v zerkale by Svetlana Proskurina
- Le Petit Prince a dit by Christine Pascal
- Quelque part vers Conakry by Françoise Ebrard
- Sans un cri by Jeanne Labrune
- Vagabond by Ann Le Monnier
- Warszawa. Année 5703 by Janusz Kijowski

Short films

- L’autre Célia by Irène Jouannet
- F.X. Messerschmidt sculpteur (1736-1783) by Marino Vagliano
- Juliette by Didier Bivel
- Le Trou de la corneille by François Hanss
- Léa by Christophe Debuisne
- Pilotes by Olivier Zagar
- Versailles Rive Gauche by Bruno Podalydès
- Voleur d’images by Bruno Victor-Pujebet

== Official Awards ==
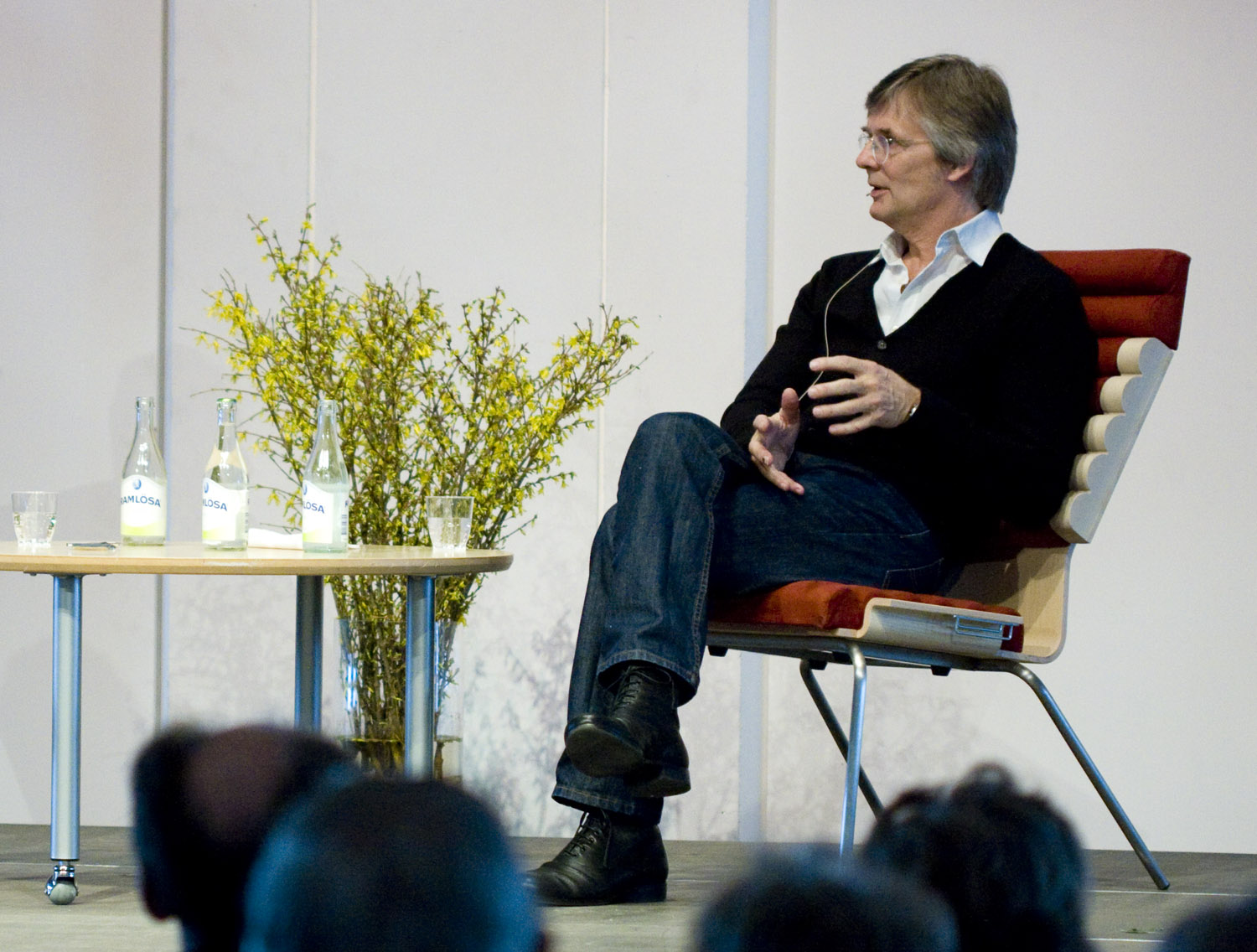
Bille August, Palme d'Or winner

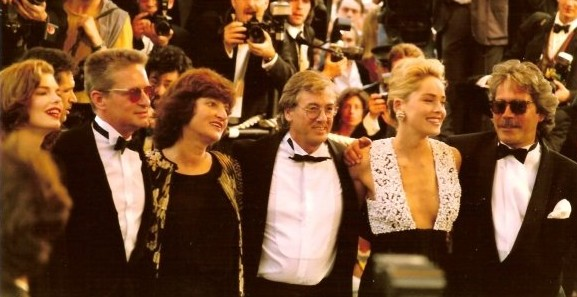
Cast and crew of Basic Instinct, opening film of the 1992 Cannes Film Festival

=== In Competition ===
- Palme d'Or: The Best Intentions by Bille August
- Grand Prize of the Jury: The Stolen Children by Gianni Amelio
- Best Director: Robert Altman for The Player
- Best Actress: Pernilla August for The Best Intentions
- Best Actor: Tim Robbins for The Player
- Jury Prize:
  - Dream of Light by Víctor Erice
  - An Independent Life by Vitali Kanevsky
- 45th Anniversary Prize: Howards End by James Ivory

=== Caméra d'Or ===
- Mac by John Turturro

=== Short Film Palme d'Or ===
- Omnibus by Sam Karmann

== Independent Awards ==
=== FIPRESCI Prize ===
- Dream of Light by Víctor Erice

=== Commission Supérieure Technique ===
- Technical Grand Prize: Fernando Solanas (for technical visual and aural excellence) for The Journey

=== Prize of the Ecumenical Jury ===
- The Stolen Children by Gianni Amelio
  - Special Mention:
    - In the Country of Juliets by Mehdi Charef
    - The Journey by Fernando Solanas

=== Award of the Youth ===
- Foreign Film: Strictly Ballroom by Baz Luhrmann
- French Film: Sans un cri by Jeanne Labrune
- Special Award of the Youth: Man Bites Dog by Rémy Belvaux, André Bonzel, Benoît Poelvoorde

=== International Critics' Week ===
- SACD Award:
  - Best Short: The Room by Jeff Balsmeyer
  - Best Feature: Man Bites Dog by Rémy Belvaux, André Bonzel, Benoît Poelvoorde
- Canal+ Award: Floating by Richard Heslop

== Media ==
- INA: Opening of the 1992 Festival (commentary in French)
