= List of crime films of 1991 =

This is a list of crime films released in 1991.

Title	Director	Cast	Country	Notes
Billy Bathgate	Robert Benton	Dustin Hoffman, Nicole Kidman, Loren Dean, Bruce Willis, Steven Hill	United States	
Bright Angel	Michael Fields	Dermot Mulroney, Lili Taylor, Sam Shepard	United States	Crime drama
Bugsy	Barry Levinson	Warren Beatty, Annette Bening, Harvey Keitel, Ben Kingsley, Joe Mantegna, Elliott Gould	United States	
Cape Fear	Martin Scorsese	Robert De Niro, Nick Nolte, Jessica Lange, Juliette Lewis	United States	
Homicide	David Mamet	Joe Mantegna, William H. Macy, Natalia Nogulich	United States	Crime drama
Hudson Hawk	Michael Lehmann	Bruce Willis, Danny Aiello, Andie MacDowell, Richard E. Grant, Sandra Bernhard, James Coburn, David Caruso	United States	Crime comedy
Johnny Stecchino	Roberto Benigni	Roberto Benigni, Nicoletta Braschi, Paolo Bonacelli	Italy	Crime comedy, gangster film
The Last Boy Scout	Tony Scott	Bruce Willis, Damon Wayans, Chelsea Field, Noble Willingham, Taylor Negron, Danielle Harris, Halle Berry	United States	Crime thriller
Laws of Gravity	Nick Gomez	Peter Greene, Adam Trese, Arabella Field	United States	
Let Him Have It	Peter Medak	Christopher Eccleston, Paul Reynolds	United Kingdom; France	
Man Bites Dog	Remy Belvaux, André Bonzel, Benoît Poelvoorde	Benoît Poelvoorde, Remy Belvaux, André Bonzel	France; Belgium	Crime comedy
Mobsters	Michael Karbelnikoff	Christian Slater, Patrick Dempsey, Richard Grieco, Costas Mandylor, Michael Gambon, Lara Flynn Boyle, F. Murray Abraham, Anthony Quinn	United States	
New Jack City	Mario Van Peebles	Wesley Snipes, Ice-T, Mario Van Peebles, Judd Nelson, Chris Rock	United States	
Once a Thief	John Woo	Chow Yun-fat, Leslie Cheung, Cherie Chung	Hong Kong; China	
One Good Cop	Heywood Gould	Michael Keaton, Rene Russo, Anthony LaPaglia	United States	
Oscar	John Landis	Sylvester Stallone, Ornella Muti, Peter Riegert, Vincent Spano, Marisa Tomei	United States	
Out for Justice	John Flynn	Steven Seagal, William Forsythe, Jerry Orbach	United States	Gangster film
Point Break	Kathryn Bigelow	Patrick Swayze, Keanu Reeves, Gary Busey, Lori Petty, John C. McGinley, James LeGros	United States	
A Rage in Harlem	Bill Duke	Forest Whitaker, Gregory Hines, Robin Givens	United Kingdom; United States	Crime drama
Ricochet	Russell Mulcahy	Denzel Washington, John Lithgow, Ice-T	United States	
