= La Memoria del agua =

La Memoria del agua may refer to:

- Memory of Water (1994 film)
- The Memory of Water (film), 2015 film
