= Eduardo Pavlovsky =

Argentinian author and actor (1933–2015)

Eduardo Alejo Pavlovsky, often nicknamed Tato Pavlovsky, (December 10, 1933 – October 4, 2015) was an Argentine playwright, psychoanalyst, actor, and novelist. His best-known plays included El señor Galindez in 1973, La muerte de Margueritte Duras, and Potestad.

== Biography ==
Pavlovsky was born in Buenos Aires, Argentina, on December 10, 1933. He originally became a doctor, psychoanalyst and therapist. According to the Buenos Aires Herald, Pavlovsky is considered a "pioneer of psychodrama in Latin America." He simultaneously began writing plays, often focusing on social and political issues affecting Argentina during the era. His first major play, El señor Galindez, which debuted in 1973, focused on the a torturer who also holds a separate, day-to-day job while keeping his involvement in torture a secret. His other plays included Potestad, Rojos globos rojos, La muerte de Marguerite Duras, La espera trágica, La mueca, Telarañas, El cardenal, Variaciones Meyerhold, and Sólo brumas.

He fled Argentina during the late 1970s during the National Reorganization Process military dictatorship of Jorge Rafael Videla following a series of threats. He lived in exile in Spain until a democratic government was restored during the late 1980s.

His film credits as an actor included Tangos, the Exile of Gardel in 1986 and The Cloud in 1998, both of which were directed by Fernando Solanas. Pavlovsky also published a novel, "Sentido contrario," in 1997.

Eduardo Pavlovsky died in Buenos Aires on October 4, 2015, at age 81.

His son Federico is an Argentine psychiatrist and journalist.
