= 6th European Film Awards =

1993 film awards ceremony in Germany

- Date: 4 December 1993
- Site: Babelsberg Studio, Potsdam, Germany
- Hosted by: Fanny Ardant
- Organized by: European Film Academy

Highlights
- Best Picture: Close to Eden
- Best Actor: Daniel Auteuil; A Heart in Winter
- Best Actress: Maia Morgenstern; The Oak
- Most nominations: A Heart in Winter (2)

The 6th European Film Awards were presented on 4 December 1993, in Potsdam, Germany. The winners were selected by the members of the European Film Academy.

== Awards ==
=== Best Film ===
| English title | Original title | Director(s) | Country |
|---|---|---|---|
| Close to Eden | Урга — территория любви | Nikita Mikhalkov | Russia |
| Benny's Video | | Michael Haneke | Austria |
| A Heart in Winter | Un cœur en hiver | Claude Sautet | France |
| Man Bites Dog | C'est arrivé près de chez vous | Rémy Belvaux, André Bonzel, Benoît Poelvoorde | Belgium |
| Orlando | | Sally Potter | United Kingdom |
| Antonio's Girlfriend | La petite amie d'Antonio | Manuel Poirier | France |

=== Best Documentary ===
| Result | English title | Original title | Director(s) | Country |
|---|---|---|---|---|
| Winner | Misfits To Yuppies | Det sociala arvet | Stefan Jarl | Sweden |
| Special Mentions | The Man Who Loves Gary Lineker | | Ylli Hasani, Steve Sklair | United Kingdom |
| Special Mentions | 89mm from Europe | 89 mm od Europy | Marcel Łoziński | Poland |

=== Lifetime Achievement Award ===
| Recipient | Occupation |
|---|---|
| (Italy) Michelangelo Antonioni | film director, screenwriter, editor |
