= Luis Cardei =

Argentine singer (1944–2000)

Luis Cardei (1945–2000) was a tango singer and actor known for his performance style.

== Early years ==
Son of Catalina Fontanella -a dressmaker- and Luis Eduardo Cardei -an amateur singer- his health was always very frail due to hemophilia. This condition was diagnosed in him at the age of 8. He underwent surgery several times, to the point that during some years he was not able to walk and, finally, he was able to walk only with a cane. As he could not participate in normal children's activities -soccer, playing outside with friends-, he filled those gaps by listening to the radio, and in particular to tango. He knew all the repertoires and could imitate any singer. Despite all his health issues, he had a very lively personality and, motivated by his friends, he signed up to several tango singing contests in the neighborhoods of Chacarita, La Paternal and Villa Urquiza, but even though he was always very applauded, he never won. He had a handful of jobs, from taking bets -which he did during more than ten years- to salesman, while in parallel he continued to sing tango.

== Discography ==
- De Madrugada (2002)
- Tangos de Ayer

== Filmography ==
- The Cloud (1998)

== Sources ==
- http://www.abctango.com/notas/english/cardeing.html
- Clarín - Tango de Colección 17 - Luis Cardei
