= Isabel Quintanilla =

Spanish painter

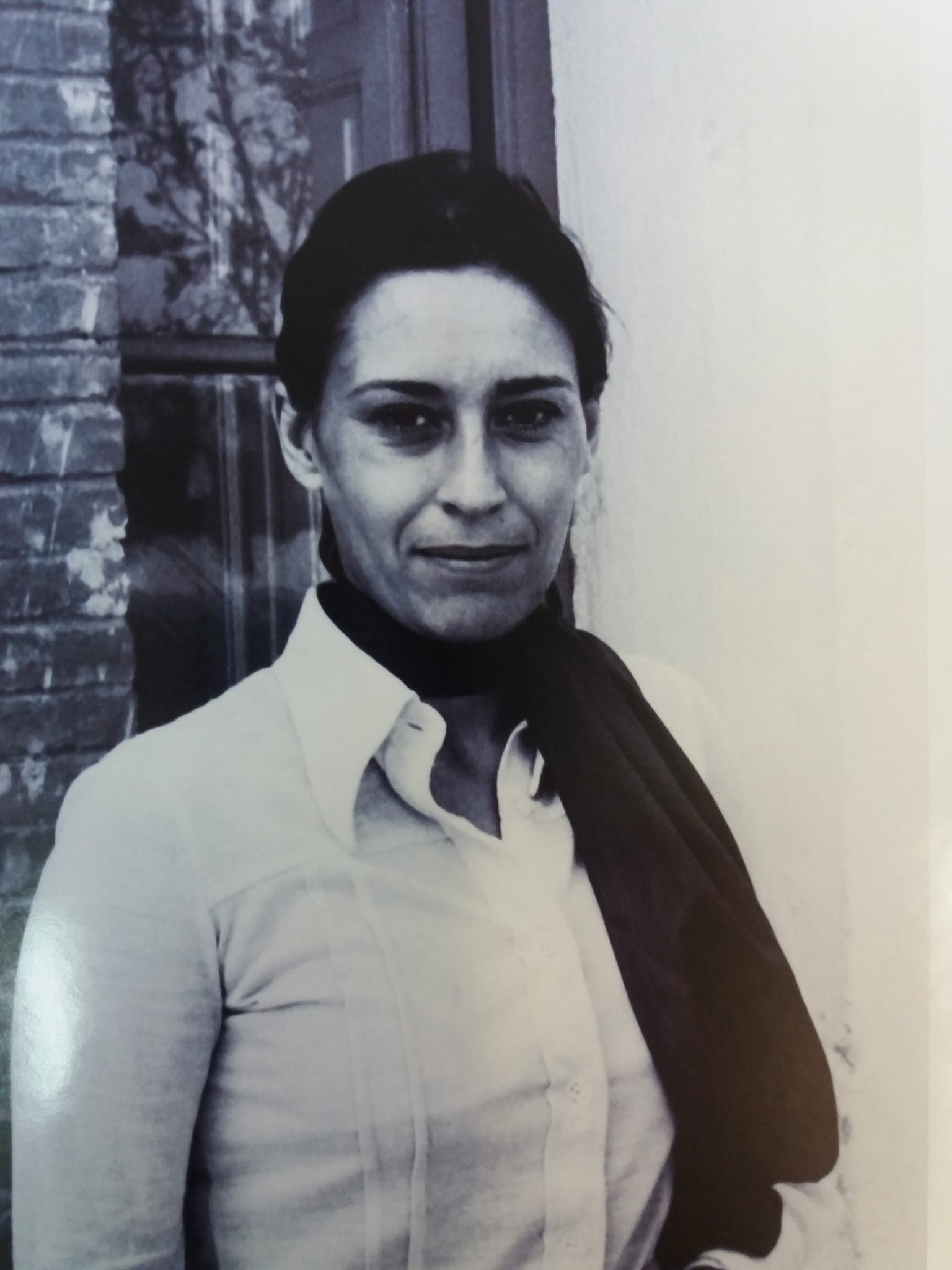
- Born: July 22, 1938; Madrid, Spain
- Died: October 24, 2017 (aged 79); Brunete
- Education: Instituto Beatriz Galindo; Escuela Superior de Bellas Artes
- Movement: Realism
- Spouse: Francisco López Hernández

Isabel Quintanilla (July 22, 1938 – October 24, 2017) was a Spanish visual artist belonging to the new Spanish realism movement. Her paintings usually portray still life, describing simple objects and views from everyday life, as well as landscape paintings.

== Biography ==
Isabel Quintanilla was born in the Pacifico neighborhood of Madrid on July 22, 1938 to José Antonio and María Ascensión. Her father was a mining engineer who became a Spanish Republican commandant during the Spanish Civil War. He was killed in 1941 in a Francoist concentration camp in Burgos, after which her mother worked as a dressmaker to support Quintanilla and her sister.

Quintanilla began studying art at an early age, attending drawing and painting classes in the studios of Maroussia Valero and Manuel Gutiérrez Navas. In 1953, at the age of fifteen, she entered the Escuela Superior de Bellas Artes in San Fernando, where she would meet artists Antonio López García and Francisco López Hernández. She graduated six years afterward in 1959.

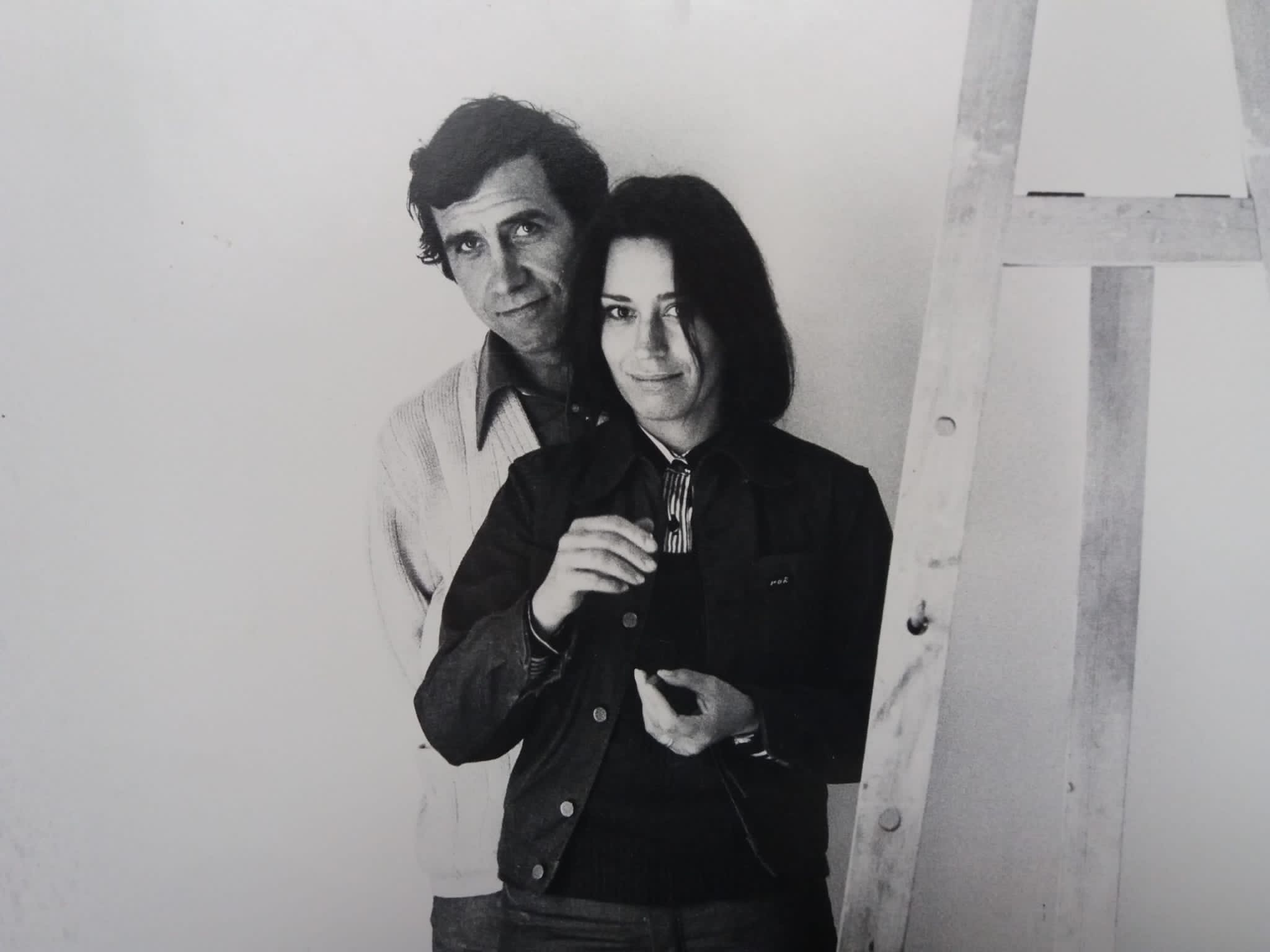
Quintanilla and her husband, Francisco López Hernandez.

In 1960, Quintanilla received a scholarship and became a drawing assistant at Instituto Beatriz Galindo. Soon after that, she married Francisco López Hernández. When he received a scholarship to attend the Escuela de Bellas Artes de España in Rome, she accompanied him while completing an independent study of Pompeian frescos and ancient art. The couple returned to Madrid in 1965 and Quintanilla focused her work on still lives, painting intimate portraits of objects around her house, such as cups, sewing machines, and lamps. The subjects of her paintings evoked domesticity and referenced the users of these objects without depicting them.

Quintanilla's first solo exhibition took place in Caltanissetta in Palermo, Italy. In 1970, Quintanilla met Ernest Wuthenow, a collector and gallerist who helped her exhibit her work across Europe in the 1970s and 1980s. She was particularly successful in Germany, and had solo shows in Frankfurt, Hamburg, and Darmstadt. In 1982, she was granted a Bachelor of Fine Arts by the Universidad Complutense de Madrid.

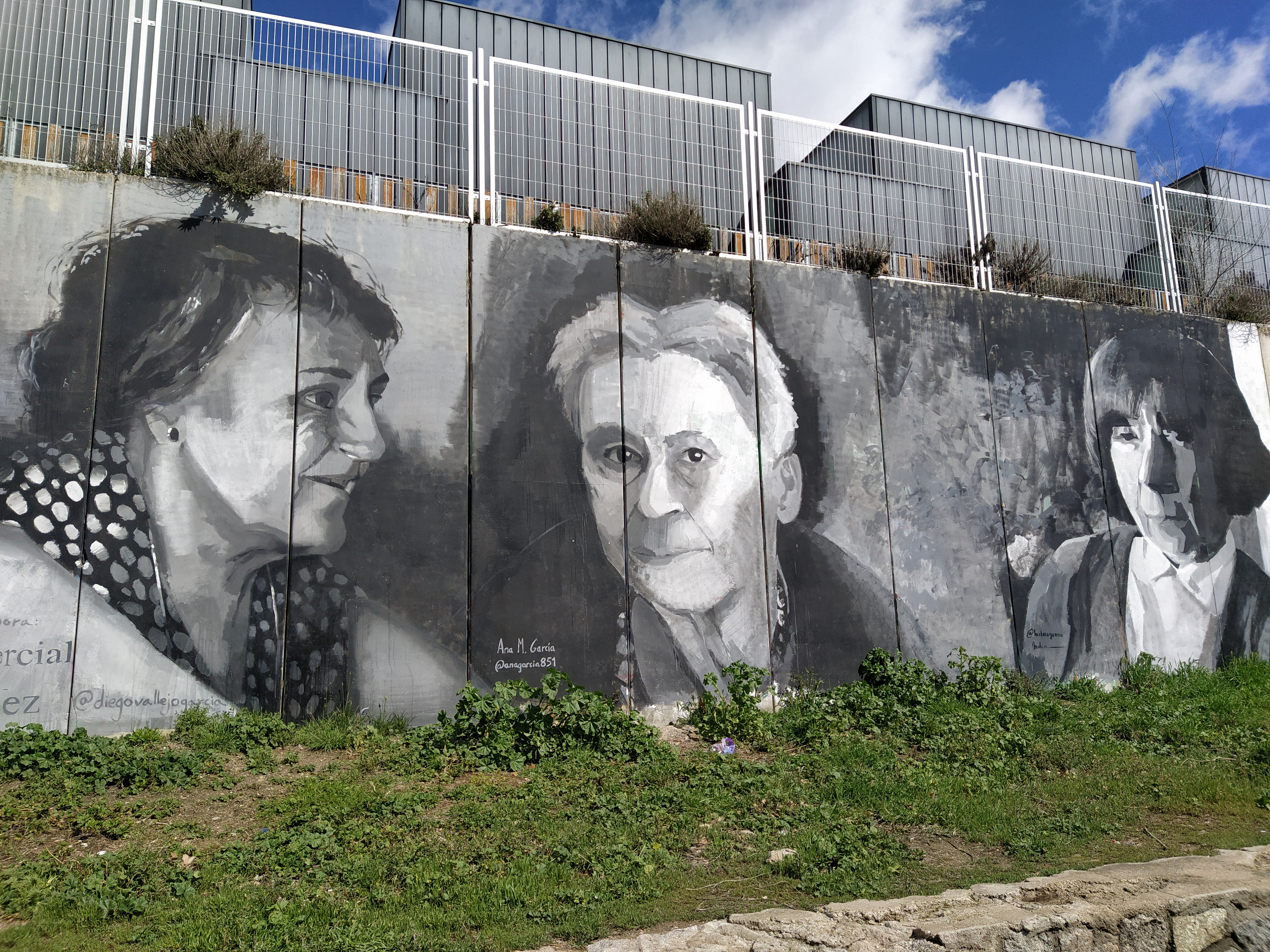
Mural located in Ávila depicting Quintanilla (center), and artists María Moreno and Amalia Avia.

She was a part of a group of artists called the Madrid Realists, who were connected by familial ties and friendship, and included Antonio López García and his wife Maria Moreno López, Amalia Ava, and Esperanza Parada. In 1996, she was the subject of a retrospective at the Centro Cultural Conde Duque in Madrid, as well as a solo exhibition at Galería Leandro Navarro. Quintanilla was also featured in an exhibit on the Madrid Realists at the Thyssen-Bornemisza Museum in 2016.

She died on October 24, 2017 at the age of 79.

== Solo exhibitions ==
- 1966 – Galeria Edurne, Madrid
- 1968 – Galeria La Pasarela, Seville
- 1970 – Galeria Egam, Madrid; Galerie Buchholz, Munich
- 1974 – Galerie Herbert Meyer-Ellinger, Frankfurt
- 1980 – Kunstverein, Braunschweig
- 2024 - Museo Nacional Thyssen-Bornemisza, Madrid
