= Víctor Erice =

Spanish film director (born 1940)

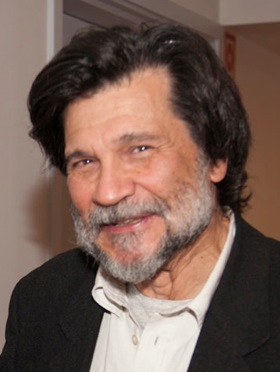
- Erice in 2013
- Born: Víctor Erice Aras; 30 June 1940 (age 86); Karrantza, Biscay, Spain
- Education: University of Madrid
- Occupations: Film director; writer
- Years active: 1961–present

Víctor Erice Aras (Spanish: [ˈbiɣtoɾ eˈɾiθe]; born 30 June 1940) is a Spanish film director. He is best known for his first two feature fiction films, The Spirit of the Beehive (1973), which many regard as one of the greatest Spanish films ever made, and El Sur (1983).

== Early life ==
Erice was born in Karrantza, Biscay. He studied law, political science, and economics at the University of Madrid. He also attended the Escuela Oficial de Cinematografia in 1963 to study film direction.

== Career ==
He wrote film criticism and reviews for the Spanish film journal Nuestro Cine, and made a series of short films before making his first feature film, The Spirit of the Beehive (1973), a critical portrait of the 1940s rural Spain.

Erice was among other filmmakers, such as Luis Buñuel, who lived in “such restricted societies as Franco’s Spain,” to take aim at the authoritarian rule in power. At the time his first film was released in 1973, Francisco Franco was still in power. One of the things The Spirit of the Beehive is known for is its use of symbolism to portray what life was like in Spain under Franco’s rule. Setting the movie in 1940, at the start of Franco’s rule, was a risk for Erice, given that the film “wasn't a propagandist effort in which stalwart Francoists won victories against evil, priest-massacring Republicans.”

Ten years later, Erice wrote and directed El Sur (1983), based on a story from Adelaida García Morales, another highly regarded film, although the producer Elías Querejeta only allowed him to film the first two-thirds of the story. His third movie, The Quince Tree Sun (1992) is a documentary about painter Antonio López García. The film won the Jury Prize and the FIPRESCI Prize at the 1992 Cannes Film Festival.

Erice worked in the development of (and was set to direct) The Shanghai Spell, the adaptation of the Juan Marsé's namesake novel, but producer Andrés Vicente Gómez eventually tasked the project to Fernando Trueba instead. This rejection entailed "a great deal of frustration" for Erice.

He was a member of the jury at the 2010 Cannes Film Festival in May.

At the 2014 Locarno Film Festival, Erice was awarded with a Golden Leopard award for lifetime achievement.

In July 2022, thirty years after his last full-length film, a project for a new Erice film (Cerrar los ojos) supported by Pecado Films, Tándem Films, Nautilus as well as Canal Sur was revealed to be in development. The film premiered in the following year at the 2023 Cannes Film Festival and was met with very positive reviews.

== Appraisal ==
Geoff Andrew, in the Time Out Film Guide, praises Erice's contribution to Ten Minutes Older: The Trumpet (Lifeline) as "quite masterly", adding "it only makes you wish he worked more frequently". Excluding short films, Erice has produced only four major works: The Spirit of the Beehive (1973), the unfinished El Sur (1983), Dream of Light (1992, The Quince Tree Sun), and Close Your Eyes (2023 film). Critic Tony Rayns describes The Spirit of the Beehive as "a haunting mood piece that dispenses with plot and works its spells through intricate patterns of sound and image" and of El Sur it has been said that "Erice creates his film as a canvas, conjuring painterly images of slow dissolves and shafts of light that match Caravaggio in their power to animate a scene of stillness, or freeze one of mad movement".

== Legacy ==
Erice's work would go on to influence filmmakers such as Carla Simón, Carlos Vermut, Alejandro Amenábar, Oliver Laxe, Estibaliz Urresola, and Jaione Camborda. His portrayal of children dreaming and their attraction to fantastic worlds during and around times like the Spanish Civil War inspired Mexican director Guillermo del Toro and his respective films, including The Devil's Backbone, and Pan's Labyrinth.

== Political views ==
In December 2023, alongside 50 other filmmakers, Erice signed an open letter published in Libération demanding a ceasefire and an end to the killing of civilians amid the 2023 Israeli invasion of the Gaza Strip, and for a humanitarian corridor into Gaza to be established for humanitarian aid, and the release of hostages.

== Filmography ==
=== Feature films ===
Year	Film	Credited as			Notes
Year	Film	Director	Writer	Producer	Notes
1967	El próximo otoño	No	Yes	No	
1968	Oscuros sueños de agosto	No	Yes	No	
1973	El espíritu de la colmena	Yes	Yes	No	
1983	El sur	Yes	Yes	No	
1992	El sol del membrillo	Yes	Yes	No	Documentary film
2016	Víctor Erice: Abbas Kiarostami. Correspondencias	Yes	Yes	Yes	Experimental documentary film co-directed with Abbas Kiarostami started as an audiovisual exposition in 2006 and released as a movie in 2016. Also co-cinematographer.
2023	Close Your Eyes	Yes	Yes	Yes	

=== Short films ===
Year	Film	Credited as		Notes
Year	Film	Director	Writer	Notes
1961	Al final de la fiesta subieron a la terraza	Yes	No	Student film
1962	Páginas de un diario perdido	Yes	No	Student film
1962	Entre las vías	Yes	No	Student film
1963	Los días perdidos	Yes	Yes	Student film
1969	Segment 3	Yes	Yes	Segment of the anthology film Los desafíos.
2002	Lifeline	Yes	Yes	Segment of the anthology film Ten Minutes Older: The Trumpet.
2003	Apuntes (1990-2003)	Yes	Yes	Documentary medium-length film about his documentary El sol del membrillo.
2005	Apoyo de la luz	Yes	Yes	Also cinematographer.
2006	La morte rouge	Yes	Yes	Experimental documentary short film Also narrator and San Sebastián photos.
2007	Sea-Mail	Yes	Yes	Also producer, camera operator and main actor.
2012	Ana, Three Minutes	Yes	Yes	Segment of the anthology film 3.11 A Sense of Home Films.
2012	Vidros partidos	Yes	Yes	Segment of the anthology film Centro histórico. Also segment producer.
2018	Plegaría	Yes	No	Short film based on photos taken by him. Also producer.
2019	Piedra y cielo	Yes	No	Video installation based on the work of Jorge Oteiza.

== Awards ==
- Jury Prize, 1992 Cannes Film Festival
- FIRPRESCI Prize, 1992 Cannes Film Festival
- Golden Leopard for lifetime achievement
