= Antonio López García =

Spanish painter and sculptor (born 1936)

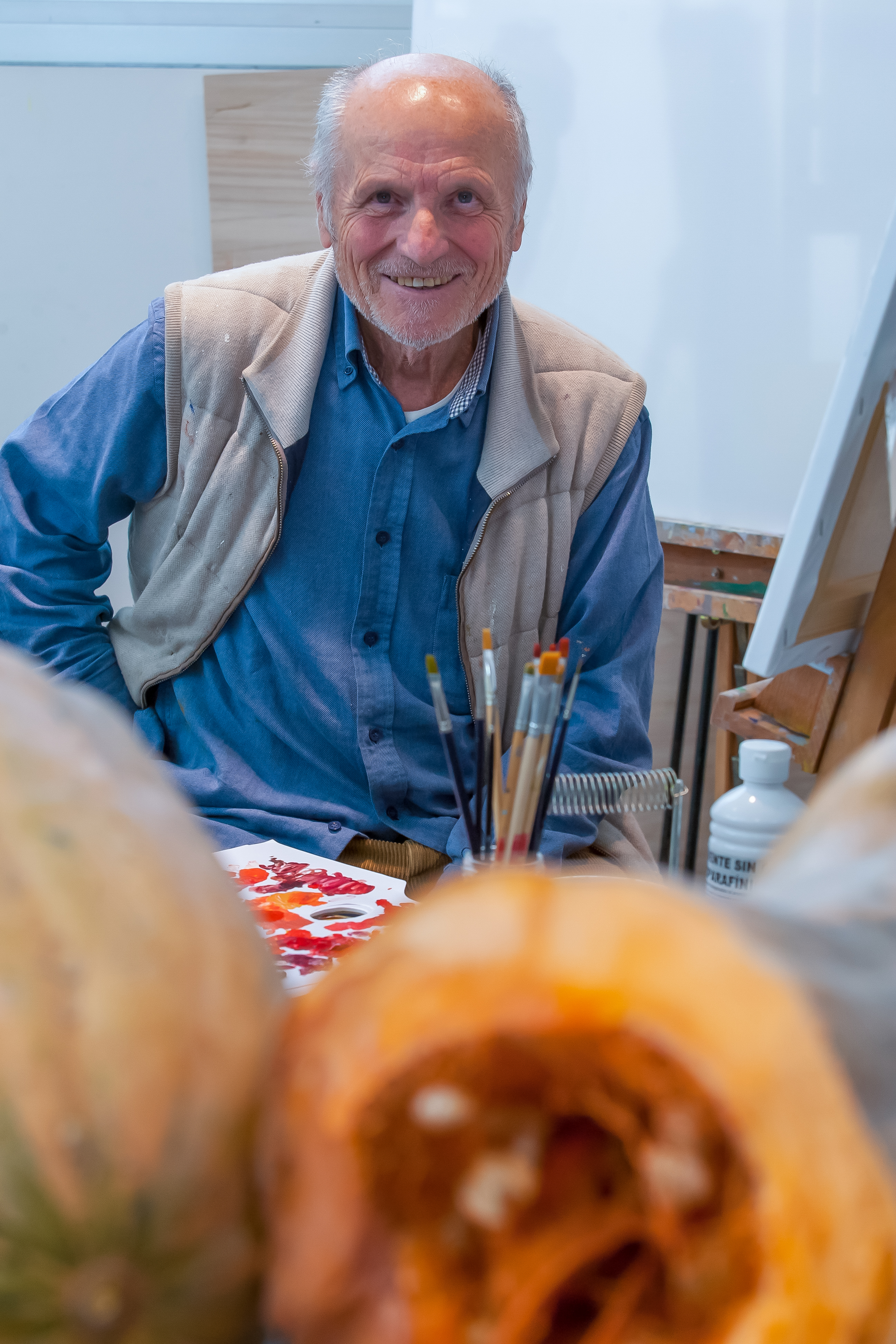
- Antonio López García in a studio, University of Navarre (2018)
- Born: 6 January 1936 (age 90); Tomelloso (Ciudad Real), Spain
- Known for: Painting, Sculpture

Antonio López García (born 6 January 1936) is a Spanish painter and sculptor, known for his realistic style. He has been praised by leading art critics, such as Robert Hughes, who considered him "the greatest realist artist alive" in 1986. His style sometimes is deemed hyperrealistic. His painting was the subject of the film El Sol del Membrillo, by Victor Erice, in 1992.

== Early life ==
Antonio López was born on 6 January 1936 in Tomelloso, Ciudad Real, a few months before the beginning of the Spanish Civil War. It first appeared that Antonio would continue in the family tradition as a farmer, but an early facility for drawing caught the attention of his uncle Antonio López Torres, a local painter of landscapes, who gave him his first lessons. In 1949 he moved to Madrid in order to study for entrance to the competitive Real Academia de Bellas Artes de San Fernando.

== Postwar period ==
Two Backs (Male-Female), pencil on paper, 38cm x 54cm, 1964

Between 1950 and 1955 he studied art at the Real Academia de Bellas Artes de San Fernando, winning a number of prizes. While at the school he developed a friendship with María Moreno—also a painter—whom he would marry in 1961. He also formed friendships with Francisco López Hernández, Amalia Avia, and Isabel Quintanilla. Out of this nucleus a realist group, the New Spanish Realists, was formed in Madrid. López García became friends with Jack Chambers, a Canadian studying in Madrid. Although Chambers did not belong to the New Spanish Realists, parallels to their style can be found in his work created in Canada in the late 1960s.

Madrid of the postwar period was isolated from the international panorama of art and culture. All the information that López García accessed on contemporary art was derived from library books at the school; he gradually became aware of Picasso and other great artists of the period.

In 1955, a scholarship allowed him to travel to Italy with Francisco López and study Italian painting from the Renaissance. During this period he began to reevaluate Spanish painting in the Prado, especially Velázquez, a constant reference.

== Varieties of realism ==
By 1957 his work had registered a certain surreal quality. Figures and objects appear to float in space and his pictures are populated by images removed from their contexts. The fantastic vein remains at least until 1964.

During this period Antonio López shows an increasing interest in the representation of objects, independent of their contained narrative load. Magic Realism continued to inform his work through the mid-1960s, but gradually, as he said, "the physical world gained more prestige in my eyes." In fact he had never abandoned it. The 1959 oil Francisco Carretero and A. López García Talking, like many portraits and townscapes of this period, is devoid of surrealistic devices. So are Autumn (1961) and The Sea (1961–70). Some of his relief sculptures conjure fantastic episodes, such as The Apparition (1963), in which a child hovers mid-air against a wall, gliding toward an open door. There are many affinities with the Tuscan Renaissance in his work in three dimensions. The ethereal Head of Carmencita (1965–68), for example, might at first glance be taken for a quattrocento Florentine bronze by Desiderio da Settignano. García's painting also reverberates with the art of the past. The Grapevine (1960) evokes Tiepolo's sunlight, The Quince Tree (1962) Chardin's dusky murk, and other paintings echo Old Masters from Dürer to Degas.

Woman in the bathtub, oil on canvas, 1968 by Antonio López García

López's perception and understanding of beauty in the objects he portrays can be seen in paintings such as The Sideboard (1965–66), or the atmospheric views of Madrid from the 1970s. Much of López's works are devoted to mundane objects like ordinary people, buildings, plants, and interiors. However, he was able to bring attention to these simple forms, encouraging the viewer to re-examine the presence and beauty of the ordinary objects.

He began to paint panoramic views of Madrid about 1960. His work from this period attracted recognition, first within Spain—in 1961 he had his first solo show in Madrid—and later, in 1965 and 1968, at the Staempfli Gallery in New York. López faithfully adhered to familiar subjects: images of women, anonymous and humble objects of domestic surroundings, desolate spaces, images of his garden and landscape. The pictures are sometimes worked on for more than twenty years, some of them remaining unfinished.

As the artist explains, "the pictorial nucleus begins to grow and you work until the whole surface has an expressive intensity equivalent to what you have before you, converted into a pictorial reality."

== Exhibitions ==
Because he is not prolific, López has had only a handful of one-artist shows. His first individual show was held at the Ateneo de Madrid in 1957. Three have been in New York: two in the 1960s and one, in 1986, at his current representative, the Marlborough Gallery. In 2008 he was featured in a solo exhibition at the Museum of Fine Arts, Boston. The exhibition included the two enormous bronze heads he sculpted of his grandchildren, which were placed on the front lawn of the Museum of Fine Arts. His work is in several major U.S. museum collections.

Street of Santa Rita, oil on canvas, 1961 by Antonio López García

== Recognition and influence ==
During most of his career, Antonio López García worked amidst an artistic culture dominated first by abstraction and later by conceptual currents. In the 1960s and the 1970s, his prestige quietly grew. It is possible to establish links between his work and the new European figurative tendencies or the American hyperrealism. He has been criticized by some modern artists for what they consider neo-academism.

López has won numerous awards. After winning the III National Art Contest in his final year of art school, he was awarded a trip to Italy by the Spanish Ministry of Education, in order to study the works of Renaissance masters. He has also been awarded the Medalla de Oro from Castilla-La Mancha and the Community of Madrid, in 1986 and 1990, respectively. In 2004, López was inducted as an honorary member of the Academy of Arts and Letters in New York, and in 2006 he was awarded the Velázquez Prize for Fine Arts.

== Films ==
López is featured in an award-winning 1992 film, El Sol del Membrillo, directed by Victor Erice and written by both. The film, which portrays López's struggles to paint, and then draw, a small quince tree growing in the backyard of his studio, gives considerable attention to his almost fanatically exacting working methods.

Irises and Roses, oil on canvas, 1977–80 by Antonio López García

== Public collections ==
- Baltimore Museum of Art
- Bilbao Fine Arts Museum
- Cleveland Museum of Art
- Fogg Art Museum, Harvard University, Cambridge, Massachusetts
- Kunsthalle Hamburg
- Musée National d’Art Moderne, Centre Pompidou, Paris
- Museo Nacional Centro de Arte Reina Sofía, Madrid
- Museum of Fine Arts, Boston
- Museum of Modern Art, New York
- Nagasaki Prefectural Art Museum

== See also ==
- Hyperrealism (visual arts)
- Magic Realism

== Bibliography ==
- Nieve, Francisco, Antonio López García, Rizzoli International, 1986
- Rizzoli, Antonio López García, Rizzoli International, 1990
- Brutvan, Cheryl, Antonio Lopez Garcia, MFA Publications, 2008
- Serraller, Francisco Calvo, Antonio López García: Drawings, D.A.P./Distributed Art Publishers, Inc., 2010. ISBN 978-1-935202-25-7.
