= El Sur (film) =

- Directed by: Víctor Erice
- Screenplay by: Víctor Erice
- Based on: El Sur by Adelaida García Morales
- Produced by: Elías Querejeta
- Starring: Omero Antonutti; Sonsoles Aranguren; Icíar Bollaín; Aurore Clément
- Cinematography: José Luis Alcaine
- Edited by: Pablo González del Amo
- Music by: Enrique Granados
- Release date: 19 May 1983
- Running time: 95 minutes
- Country: Spain
- Language: Spanish

El Sur (The South) is a 1983 Spanish drama film directed by Spanish filmmaker Victor Erice, who also wrote the screenplay. The film was produced by Elias Querejeta, and starred Icíar Bollaín as the teenage main character. It is based on Adelaida García Morales' short novel of the same name.

As in the novella, the film takes place solely in the north of Spain. However, the novella picks up where the screenplay leaves off, taking Estrella on a journey to the south of Spain. Elías Querejeta, the film's producer, decided not to allow the filming of the latter 90 minutes, which would have been filmed in the south. Querejeta attributed this to a lack of financing, although neither Erice nor the film's cinematographer, José Luis Alcaine, believed that was the reason. Erice felt the film was incomplete and described it as an "unfinished drama" even though it was well received by critics.

== Plot ==
In 1957, Estrella, a young teen living in northern Spain, awakens to learn her father Agustín has died. Seven years prior, he had worked as a physician and a dowser who finds underground water using a divining rod and pendulum. Estrella spends her days with her mother, a former school teacher, who helps her to read and write, but it is her father who she is most interested in. When he is not in hospital working as a doctor, he is conducting mysterious experiments in the attic. Her father, and his room pique her imagination. She learns that her father had lived in southern Spain—"El Sur"—during his childhood, but left after a dispute with Estrella's grandfather.

Months pass, and Estrella's grandmother Rosario and her friend Milagros arrive to attend Estrella's First Communion. One night before bedtime, Milagros explains that during the Spanish Civil War, her grandfather supported Francisco Franco while Agustín was a Republican. When the Civil War ended, and Franco had assumed power, Agustín vowed to never return to the south again. Estrella proceeds with her communion ceremony and dances with her father at the reception afterwards.

Estrella eventually enters her father's attic space and finds he has scrawled the name Irene Ríos repeatedly and drawn pictures of her on an envelope. After school one day, Estrella sees her father's motorbike outside a cinema. Looking at the film posters, she sees Irene Ríos's name. Uncertain what she looks like, she asks a box office clerk for a program and finds out she is the blonde in the poster. A short time later, she watches her father walking out of the theater and over to a café where he writes a letter to Irene, whose real name is Laura, asking, out of superstition if she is still alive as her character died in the film. Days later, Irene replies curious why he is contacting her after several years. She also details her career struggles and life experiences since they last spoke. Agustín impulsively leaves home in the middle of the night to take a train to the south to reunite with her, but instead of getting on it, he stays in the room in the hotel next to the train station. He returns home the next morning with no one noticing and stops using his pendulum. In frustration at his strange behaviour and disappearances in the night, Estrella hides underneath her bed for several hours, which causes her mother and their maid Casilda to look for her. Julia eventually finds her while Agustín remains isolated.

In 1957, Estrella is a young teenager, being romantically pursued by another teen, nicknamed "El Carioco." He writes 'I love you' on the wall outside her home and frustrates her with phone calls. When she walks past film posters outside the cinema, she looks for Irene's name but never finds it. Unusually, her father invites her to the Grand Hotel for tea where, her father asks her about "El Carioco" and says he admires him that he can express out loud what he feels. Estrella asks her father a question she's harboured for a long time, who is Irene Rios? She tells him of her childhood discovery of his envelope with her name and image, and the night she saw his motorbike and followed him to the theater and café. She leaves, and sometime later, Agustín dies by suicide near a lakeshore. Estrella finds a receipt of a long-distance telephone call among her father's belongings, but decides to tell no one. She becomes ill, and her mother allows her to stay with her grandmother in southern Spain to recuperate.

== Cast ==
- Omero Antonutti - Agustín Arenas
- Sonsoles Aranguren - Estrella, 8 years
- Icíar Bollaín - Estrella, 15 years
- Aurore Clément - Irene Ríos / Laura
- Lola Cardona - Julia, Agustín's wife
- Rafaela Aparicio - Milagros
- Francisco Merino - Irene Ríos's Co-Star
- María Caro - Casilda
- José Vivó - Grand Hotel barman
- Germaine Montero - Doña Rosario
- José Luis Fernández, El Pirri - El Carioco

== Production ==
The film was shot in Ezcaray, La Rioja, Madrid, and Zamora. The exteriors of the Provincial Hospital, where Agustín works, correspond to the Beneficencia building in Logroño—currently home to several departments of the Government of La Rioja as well as the Professional Music Conservatory. The exteriors of the Gran Hotel correspond to the hotel of the same name in Logroño, which is currently occupied by offices. The café where the letters are read corresponds to Café Barbieri, located in the Lavapiés neighborhood of Madrid. Furthermore, the Arcadia Cinema—where the film starring Irene Ríos is screened—is actually a former movie theater, the Cinema Vesa, located in Vitoria; it has since been converted into a shopping arcade that has preserved the distinctive shell-shaped façade featured in Erice’s film.

== Reception ==
Vincent Canby of The New York Times highlighted the performances by Omero Antonutti and Icíar Bollaín, but felt the film lacked "a dominating performance like that of Ana Torrent in [The Spirit of the Beehive]. Everything about El Sur, including the highly theatrical lighting, is so artfully composed that it seems to be more about film making than characters or ideas."

The film was entered into the 1983 Cannes Film Festival. It won the Gold Hugo at the 1983 Chicago International Film Festival. The film won Best Spanish Film at the Sant Jordi Awards and the Best Director award at the Medals of the Film Writers Circle.

El Sur was voted the eighth-best Spanish film by professionals and critics in a 1996 Spanish cinema centenary.

John Patterson, of The Guardian said "This is a simple and moving cinema language, whose serenity belies the rich complexity of its visual construction and its mastery of the themes of childhood, memory and loss. A masterpiece, haunted by itself." and gave the film a 4/5 stars. On the review aggregator website Rotten Tomatoes, 100% of 14 critics' reviews are positive.
