= Cheating, Inc. =

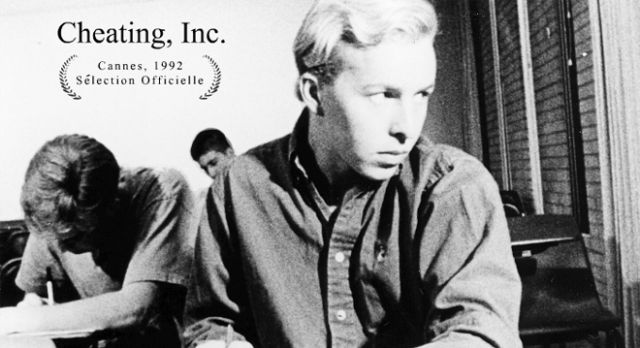
Internet Poster For "Cheating, Inc."

Cheating, Inc. is a 1991 short, non-dialogue comedic silent film about a class of students cheating on their exam. The film was an official selection of the 1992 Cannes Film Festival.

== Crew ==
- William Lorton, Director / Writer / Sound
- Erik Porter, Camera / Editor
- Matthew Peterson, Original Music
- Derek Purcell, Production Design

== Cast ==
- Ken Jones
- Derek Purcell
- Jonathan Fish
- Gregory Bernstein
- Robert Weston
- John Randall
- Todd M. Guyette
- Gary Rubenstein
- Carlos Medrano de Anda
- Jared Bushansky

== Behind the Scenes ==
- The entire film was made at The University of Southern California, Los Angeles, California, campus.
- USC CNTV 310 class, in which the film was made, required students to complete an eight-minute, non-dialogue 16mm black and white project over an eight-week period.
- 16mm / BW / Mono Optical Track / 8min 30 sec / 1.33:1 Academy Ratio

== Articles in the Media ==
- Article: 11 May 1992: "A Taste of the Big Time at Cannes" by Kenneth Turan, Los Angeles Times
- Article: 20 April 1992: "US Comes on Strong at Cannes" by Pia Farrell, The Hollywood Reporter
