= Michael Schottenberg =

Austrian actor

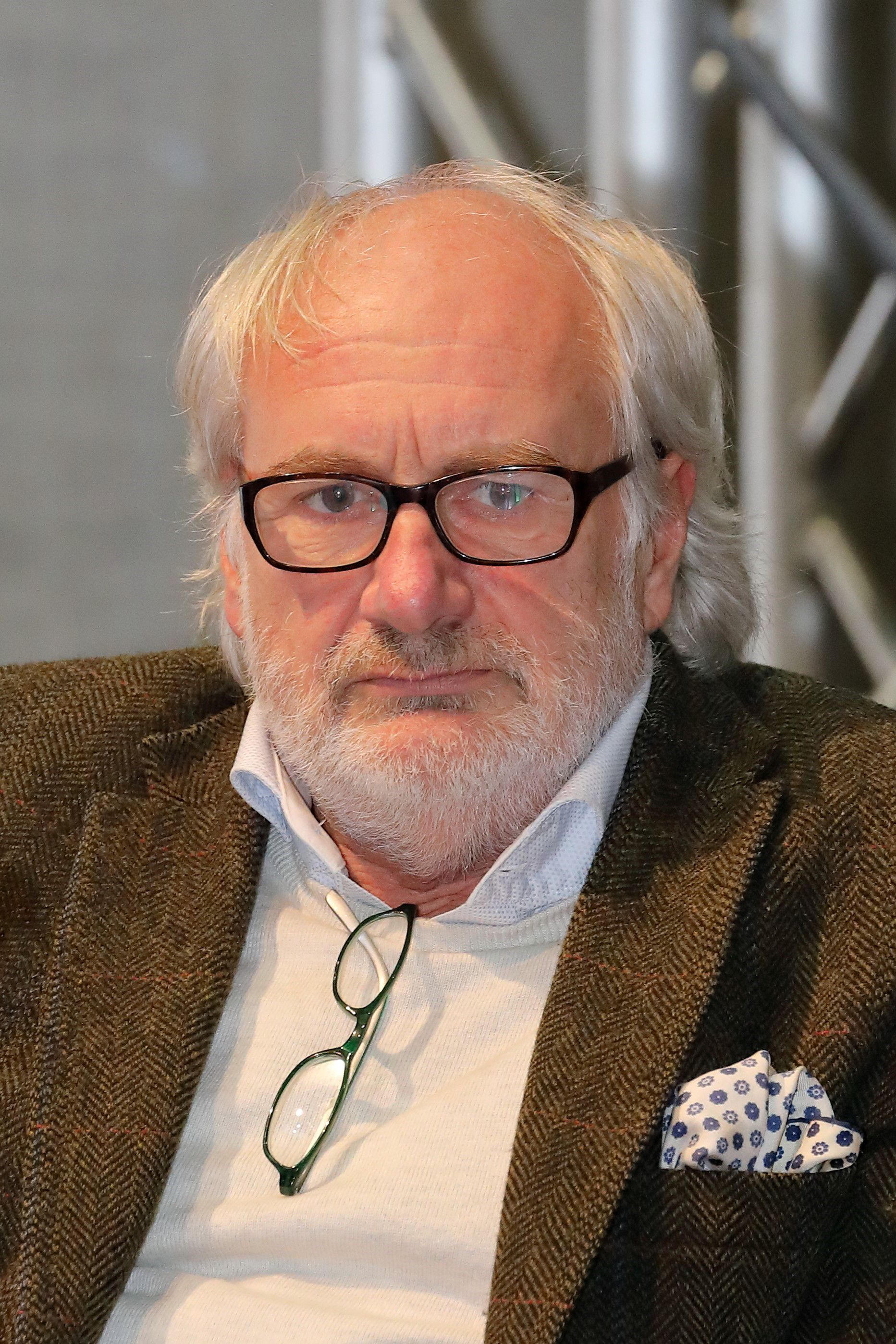
- Born: 10 July 1952 (age 73); Vienna, Austria
- Occupations: Actor, film director, screenwriter
- Years active: 1978–present

Michael Schottenberg (born 10 July 1952) is an Austrian actor, film director and screenwriter. His film The Arrival of Averill was screened in the Un Certain Regard section at the 1992 Cannes Film Festival.

== Selected filmography ==
- The Arrival of Averill (1992)
- The Piano Teacher (2001)
