= Héctor Fáver =

Film producer

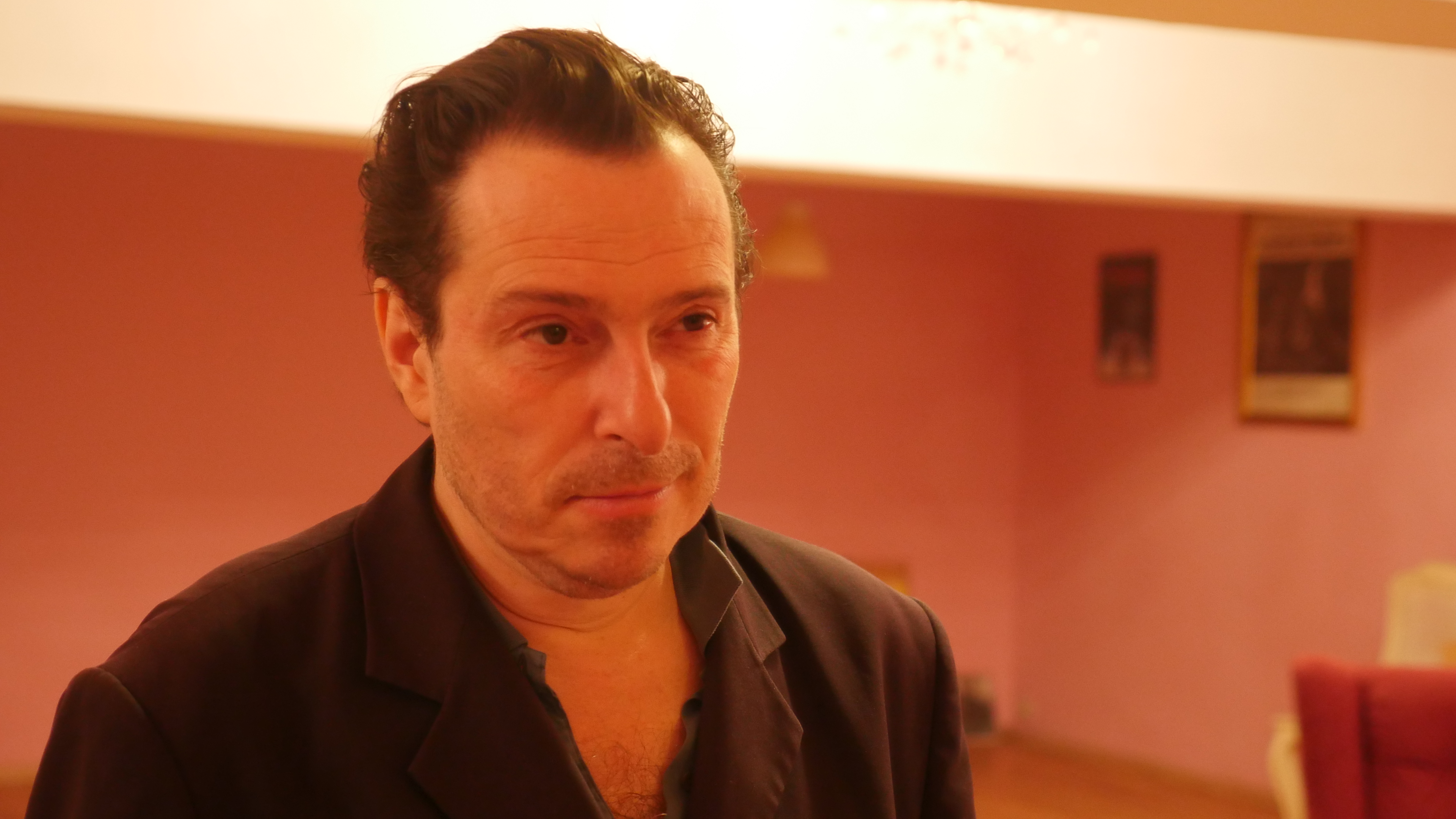
- Fáver in 2016
- Born: 9 September 1960 (age 65); Buenos Aires, Argentina
- Occupations: Film producer Film director
- Years active: 1989–2007

Héctor Fáver (born 9 September 1960) is an Argentine film producer and director. His film Memory of Water was screened in the Un Certain Regard section at the 1992 Cannes Film Festival.

== Selected filmography ==
- Memory of Water (1994)
