= The Journey (1992 film) =

1992 film

- Film poster
- Directed by: Fernando Solanas
- Written by: Fernando Solanas
- Produced by: Fernando Solanas
- Starring: Walter Quiroz
- Cinematography: Félix Monti; Fernando Solanas
- Edited by: Alberto Borello; Jacqueline Meppiel
- Music by: Egberto Gismonti; Astor Piazzolla; Fernando Solanas
- Production companies: Antenne 2 (A2); BIM Distribuzione; Bac Films
- Distributed by: Transmundo Films
- Release date: 30 April 1992
- Running time: 140 minutes
- Country: Argentina
- Language: Spanish

The Journey (Spanish: El viaje) is a 1992 Argentine drama film directed by Fernando Solanas. It was entered into the 1992 Cannes Film Festival.

== Plot summary ==
Martín (Walter Quiroz) is a 17 years old boy from Ushuaia, Argentina. His desire to meet his father, who had abandoned him and his mother, his recent break-up and this tense relationship with his mother, lead him to go travel the world with his only possession, his bicycle.

== Cast ==
- Walter Quiroz - Martin
- Soledad Alfaro - Vidala
- Ricardo Bartis - Monitor
- Christina Becerra - Violeta
- Marc Berman - Nicolas
- Chiquinho Brandão - Paizinho
- Franklin Caicedo - Rower
- Carlos Carella - Tito The Hopegiver
- Ângela Correa - Janaina
- Liliana Flores - Wayta
- Juana Hidalgo - Amalia Nunca
- Justo Martínez - Faustino
- Kiko Mendive - Americo Inconcluso
- Francisco Nápoli - Raul
- Fito Páez - Pablo
- Nathán Pinzón - District Attorney
