= The Arrival of Averill =

1992 film

- Directed by: Michael Schottenberg
- Written by: Michael Schottenberg; Michael Juncker
- Produced by: Peter Pochlatko
- Starring: Claude Aufaure
- Cinematography: Michael Riebl
- Edited by: Ortrun Bauer
- Release date: 1992
- Running time: 95 minutes
- Country: Austria
- Language: German

The Arrival of Averill (German: Averills Ankommen) is a 1992 Austrian drama film directed by Michael Schottenberg. starring Claude Aufaure, Andras Jones, Maria Bill. It was screened in the Un Certain Regard section at the 1992 Cannes Film Festival.

== Cast ==
- Claude Aufaure
- Maria Bill
- Fabio Carfora
- Umberto Conte
- Andras Jones as Averill
- Elisabeth Kaza
- Michael Kroecher
