= Adelaida García Morales =

Spanish writer (1945–2014)

Adelaida García Morales (1945, in Badajoz, Spain – 22 September 2014, in Dos Hermanas, Spain) was a Spanish writer.

== Life and work ==
Born in Badajoz, García Morales moved at the age of 13 to Seville, her parents' home town. She lived there for most of her youth. She went to university in Madrid, obtaining a degree in philosophy and letters in 1970. She also studied screenwriting at the Escuela Oficial de Cine (State School of Cinematography). She then worked as a high school teacher, teaching Spanish and philosophy, and as a model and actress, forming part of the theatre group Esperpento. She also worked for a while as a translator in Algeria.

Her first novel, Archipiélago was published in 1981, but success didn't come until 1985, when she published her acclaimed volume of two novellas: El sur, seguido de Bene. The story El sur was made into a famous film by her then partner Víctor Erice, whom she had first met in 1972. Her next book, El silencio de las sirenas, set in Capileira (a village in the Alpujarras where she had lived for five years in the late 1970s), was her most successful work, winning the Premio Herralde and the Premio Ícaro. The principal theme of the novel: an obsessive, unrequited love, was said to be based on her own obsession with the philosopher Eugenio Trías, whom she had only met once.

García Morales died of heart failure in 2014 in Dos Hermanas, in the province of Seville.

== Publications ==
=== Novels ===
- Archipiélago (1981), shortlisted for Premio Sésamo,1981
- El Sur y Bene (1985, Anagrama) – two novellas in one volume
- El silencio de las sirenas (1985, Anagrama): Premio Herralde 1985 y Premio Ícaro 1985
- La lógica del vampiro (1990, Anagrama)
- Las mujeres de Héctor (1994, Anagrama)
- La tía Águeda (1995, Anagrama)
- Nasmiya (1996, Plaza y Janés)
- El accidente (1997, Anaya)
- La señorita Medina (1997, Plaza y Janés)
- El secreto de Elisa (1999, Debate)
- Una historia perversa (2001, Planeta)
- El testamento de Regina (2001, Debate)

=== Short stories ===
- Mujeres solas (1996, Plaza y Janés)
- La carta. Cuento en Vidas de mujer (1998, Alianza)
- El legado de Amparo. Cuento en Mujeres al alba (1999, Alfaguara)
- La mirada. Cuento en Don Juan. Relatos (2008, 451 Editores)

=== Translations into English ===
- The silence of the sirens, tr. C. Hayter (1989)
- The South & Bene, tr. Sarah Marsh (1992)
- The South & Bene, tr. Thomas G. Deveny (1999)

Her short story El encuentro (A Chance Encounter) was included in Rainy Days - Días de lluvia: Short Stories by Contemporary Spanish Women Writers, an anthology edited by Montserrat Lunati, together with a translation into English.
