= Tangos, the Exile of Gardel =

1985 film

- Film poster
- Directed by: Fernando Solanas
- Produced by: Fernando Solanas
- Edited by: Luis César D'Angiolillo; Jacques Gaillard
- Music by: Ástor Piazzolla, José Luis Castiñeira de Dios, Fernando Solanas
- Release date: March 20, 1986 (Argentina)
- Running time: 119 minutes
- Countries: Argentina; France
- Language: Spanish

Tangos, the Exile of Gardel (Spanish: Tangos, el exilio de Gardel) is an Argentine-French film released on 20 March 1986, directed by Fernando Solanas, starring Marie Laforêt, Miguel Ángel Solá and Philippe Leotard. The film was selected as the Argentine entry for the Best Foreign Language Film at the 59th Academy Awards, but was not accepted as a nominee.

In a survey of the 100 greatest films of Argentine cinema carried out by the Museo del Cine Pablo Ducrós Hicken in 2000, the film reached the 15th position. In a new version of the survey organized in 2022 by the specialized magazines La vida útil, Taipei and La tierra quema, presented at the Mar del Plata International Film Festival, the film reached the 47th position.

== Summary ==
This Tango musical revolves around the lives of a group of Argentinians facing exile in Paris during the National Reorganization Process, the Argentine dictatorship that occurred from 1976 to 1983. The story follows their struggles and attempts to survive in a foreign land. As a tribute to Carlos Gardel, a renowned singer and composer, the group embarks on the creation of a tango ballet.

== Cast ==
- Marie Laforêt (Mariana)
- Miguel Ángel Solá (Juan Dos)
- Philippe Leotard (Pierre)
- Marina Vlady (Florence)
- Georges Wilson (Jean Marie)
- Lautaro Murúa (Gerardo)
- Ana María Picchio (Ana)
- Gabriela Toscano
- Michel Etcheverry (San Martín)
- Claude Melki (El Ángel)
- Gregorio Manzur (Carlos Gardel)
- Leonor Galindo
- Eduardo Pavlovsky
- Jorge Six
- Guillermo Núñez
- Mirtha CaMedeiros
- Guillermo Angelelli
- Fernando Solanas (Enrique Santos Discépolo)

== Awards ==
- 1985, Gran Premio Speciale - Venice Film Festival
- 1985, Gran Coral (First Prize) - Havana Film Festival
- 1986, César Award, France (best music)
- 1987, Silver Condor Award for Best Film - Argentine Film Critics Association

== See also ==
- List of submissions to the 59th Academy Awards for Best Foreign Language Film
- List of Argentine submissions for the Academy Award for Best Foreign Language Film
