= Dream of Light =

- Spanish film poster
- Directed by: Víctor Erice
- Written by: Víctor Erice; Antonio López García
- Produced by: Maria Moreno; Carmen Martinez
- Starring: Antonio López García; Maria Moreno; Enrique Gran
- Cinematography: Ángel Luis Fernández; Javier Aguirresarobe
- Edited by: Juan Ignacio San Mateo
- Music by: Pascal Gaigne
- Distributed by: Facets (U.S. VHS)
- Release dates: 1 October 1992 (NYFF); 30 October 1992 (Spain)
- Running time: 138 minutes
- Country: Spain
- Language: Spanish

Dream of Light (Spanish: El sol del membrillo, lit. "The Sun of the Quince"), also known as The Quince Tree Sun, is a 1992 Spanish narrative/documentary film directed by Victor Erice. The film centers on Spanish painter Antonio López García and his attempt to paint the eponymous quince tree. López struggles to capture a perfect, fleeting moment of beauty on canvas, and the film meticulously chronicles his work.

== Synopsis ==
The film begins by showing Antonio López García as a very meticulous painter. He drives in pegs to mark his stance, hangs a weight and uses strings to determine the symmetry and center of his painting. His first attempt starts out peacefully but he soon encounters problems due to the weather and the size of his canvas. As López and a friend discuss Michelangelo's The Last Judgement, painted when Michelangelo was in his 60s, which López is fast approaching, the film's subject takes shape as the relationship between the artist's work and his own mortality. López's future attempts are much more rushed and frantic as he struggles to compete with the weather, the fleeting sun and the rotting and weighed down fruit in maintaining his vision.

== Participants ==
- Antonio López García
- María Moreno
- Enrique Gran
- María López
- Carmen López
- Elisa Ruiz
- José Carretero
- Amalia Aria
- Lucio Muñoz
- Esperanza Parada
- Julio López Hernández
- Fan Xiao Ming
- Yan Sheng Dong
- Janusz Pietrzkiak
- Marek Domagala

== Reception ==
Janet Maslin wrote that "the purity and breadth of this meticulous study are all the more gratifying in view of its unprepossessing style."

== Awards ==
At the 1992 Cannes Film Festival the film won the Jury Prize and the FIPRESCI Prize.
