= Memory of Water (1994 film) =

1994 film

- Directed by: Héctor Fáver
- Written by: Héctor Fáver; Eugenia Kleber
- Produced by: Jorge Dyszel
- Starring: Isabel Abad
- Cinematography: Gerardo Gormezano
- Edited by: Manel Almiñana
- Release date: 18 August 1994
- Running time: 82 minutes
- Countries: Spain; Argentina
- Language: Spanish

Memory of Water (Spanish: La memoria del agua) is a 1994 Spanish-Argentine drama film directed by Héctor Fáver. It was screened in the Un Certain Regard section at the 1992 Cannes Film Festival.

== Cast ==
- Isabel Abad
- Nicolás Alvarez
- Héctor Fáver
- Ana Llobet
- Cristina Peralta
- Boris Rotenstein
- Jaume Viada
