= Social Genocide =

- Directed by: Fernando Solanas
- Release date: 2004
- Running time: 120 minutes
- Countries: Argentina, France, Switzerland
- Language: Spanish

Social Genocide (Spanish: Memoria del saqueo) is a 2004 Argentine documentary film directed by Fernando Solanas. The film highlights numerous political, financial, social and judicial aspects that mark out Argentina's road to ruin.

== Synopsis ==
After the fall of the military dictatorship in 1983, successive democratic governments launched a series of reforms with the goal of transforming Argentina into the world's most liberal and prosperous economy. However, less than twenty years later, Argentinians found themselves having lost nearly everything due to a regression into statism. Major unprofitable national companies were sold well below their value to foreign corporations, and the proceeds of privatizations were diverted into the pockets of corrupt officials in a country that traditionally exported foodstuffs. Malnutrition became widespread, millions of people were unemployed and sinking into poverty, and their savings disappeared in a final banking collapse.

The film attempts to vividly depict the situation that Argentina experienced, from the military dictatorship that ruled from 1976 until the outbreak of the revolt on December 19 and 20, 2001. These twenty-five years were marked by terrible economic and social problems that were concealed by a period of peace and tranquility in the country. Argentina went from a record period of prosperity to a state of need due to the exorbitant national debt, rampant corruption in the political and financial sectors, and the looting of public assets.

This situation occurred with the complicity of numerous multinational companies and international government agencies. The film aims to expose the mechanisms behind this catastrophe while highlighting the dignity and courage of millions of Argentines who struggled not to sink into poverty. Directed by Fernando E. Solanas, this film conveys the message that "another world is possible" in the face of globalization.
