= The Cloud (1998 film) =

1998 drama film

- Directed by: Fernando Solanas
- Screenplay by: Fernando Solanas; Eduardo Pavlovsky
- Starring: Eduardo Pavlovsky; Laura Novoa; Christophe Malavoy
- Cinematography: Juan Diego Solanas
- Edited by: Luis César D'Angiolillo
- Music by: Gerardo Gandini
- Release date: 1998
- Language: Spanish

The Cloud (Spanish: La nube, French: Le Nuage), also known as Clouds, is a 1998 French-Argentine drama film co-written and directed by Fernando Solanas. It was entered into the main competition at the 55th Venice International Film Festival.

== Cast ==
- Eduardo Pavlovsky as Max
- Laura Novoa as Paula
- Franklin Caicedo as Enrique
- Angela Correa as Fulo
- Favio Posca as Tito
- Christophe Malavoy as Cholo
- Bernard Le Coq as Eduardo
- Luis Cardei as Lucas
- Leonor Manso as Sonia
- Cristina Banegas as Neighbour
- Horacio Peña as Notary

== Production ==
The film got inspiration from the Eduardo Pavlovsky's stage play Rojos globos rojos.

== Release ==
The film entered the main competition at the 55th edition of the Venice Film Festival, in which it won the Golden Osella for Best Score.

== Reception ==
Variety's critic David Stratton called the film "ambitious, visually impressive", "at times, maddeningly obscure", but "certainly a handsome production". Time Out described it as "strong on atmospherics, but skimpy on plot". Stuart Klawans from The Nation referred to it as "wryly expressionistic" and "a film that's close to my heart".

Mariuccia Ciotta from il manifesto praised the film, describing it as a "dark tale that expresses less the anger of transformation than a feeling of inexorable extinction, an inner ending that arrives even before the final curtain." The Argentine cultural magazine Criterio noted: "There are things that today are only said in Solanas' films [...] resist, denounce, keep working despite the lies and the siren songs."
