= Man Bites Dog (film) =

1992 Belgian black comedy crime mockumentary

- French film poster
- Directed by: Rémy Belvaux; André Bonzel; Benoît Poelvoorde
- Screenplay by: Rémy Belvaux; André Bonzel; Benoît Poelvoorde; Vincent Tavier
- Story by: Rémy Belvaux
- Produced by: Rémy Belvaux; André Bonzel; Benoît Poelvoorde
- Starring: Benoît Poelvoorde; Rémy Belvaux; Jenny Drye; Jacqueline Poelvoorde-Pappaert; Malou Madou; André Bonzel
- Cinematography: André Bonzel
- Edited by: Rémy Belvaux; Eric Dardill
- Music by: Jean-Marc Chenut; Laurence Dufrene; Philippe Malempré
- Production company: Les Artistes Anonymes
- Release dates: 11 May 1992 (Cannes); 15 January 1993 (United States)
- Running time: 95 minutes 92 minutes (Edited cut)
- Country: Belgium
- Language: French
- Budget: BEF1 million (USD$33,000)
- Box office: $3.5 million

Man Bites Dog (French: C'est arrivé près de chez vous, literally "It Happened Near Your Home") is a 1992 French-language Belgian black comedy crime mockumentary horror film written, produced and directed by Rémy Belvaux, André Bonzel and Benoît Poelvoorde, who are also the film's co-editor, cinematographer and lead actor respectively.

The film follows a crew of filmmakers following a serial killer, recording his horrific crimes for a documentary they are producing. At first dispassionate observers, they find themselves increasingly caught up in the chaotic and nihilistic violence, eventually becoming accomplices. The film received the André Cavens Award for Best Film by the Belgian Film Critics Association (UCC). Since its release, the picture has become a cult film, and received a rare NC-17 rating for its theatrical release in the U.S.

== Plot ==
Ben is a witty and charismatic, but narcissistic and easily-enraged serial killer who holds forth at length about whatever comes to mind; be it the "craft" of murder, the failings of architecture, his own poetry, or classical music, which he plays with his girlfriend Valérie. A film crew joins him on his sadistic adventures, recording them for a fly on the wall documentary. Ben takes them to meet his family and friends while boasting of murdering many people at random and dumping their bodies in canals and quarries. The viewer witnesses these grisly killings in graphic detail.

Ben ventures into apartment buildings, explaining how it is more cost-effective to attack old people than young couples because the elderly have more cash at home and are easier to kill. In a following scene, he screams wildly at an elderly lady, causing her to have a heart attack. As she lies dying, he casually remarks that this method saved him a bullet.

Ben continues his candid explanations and his rampage, shooting, strangling, and beating his victims to death. His murders often involve robbery and theft. His victims include women, the elderly, immigrants, and postmen (his favorite targets). He enjoys killing a postman at the start of each month because they tend to have parcels with money and other goods he can steal. He also enjoys killing women because he claims they do not fight back as much. However, Ben also kills a real estate developer who rudely evicted one of his friends, and when he kills an immigrant night watchman at a construction site, he expresses concern that the construction company hired the African employee for unscrupulous reasons (before launching into his own racist tirade and requesting the film crew expose the body’s genitals). At the same construction site, Ben points out where he killed and buried two Muslims, and explains that he made sure to entomb their bodies in a wall that faces Mecca. During filming, some of Ben's crew are killed; their deaths are later called "occupational hazards" by a crew member and off-handedly mourned.

The camera crew becomes more and more involved in the murders, starting out as silent accomplices but gradually assisting Ben in his killings. When Ben invades a home and kills an entire family, they help him hold down a young boy and smother him with a pillow, all the while keeping up a casual conversation.

At the abandoned building that Ben uses for a hideout, the crew encounters two Italian criminals or gangsters also hiding out in the building. Ben kills the Italians before discovering that they were actually also being filmed by a competing documentary camera crew. Ben and his camera crew have fun taking turns as they shoot the rival crew members to death and record the whole thing.

After a night of drinking with the film crew, Ben invades a home and interrupts a couple having sex. He then takes the pair hostage, holding the man at gunpoint while he and the crew gang-rape the woman. The following morning, the camera dispassionately records the aftermath: the woman has been butchered with a knife, her entrails spilling out, while the husband had his throat cut. Later, Ben's girlfriend and family receive death threats from the brother of one of the Italian criminals whom Ben had killed earlier. Ben kills an acquaintance in front of his girlfriend and friends during a birthday dinner as it is suggested he had gotten close to her while Ben was in the hospital. Spattered with blood, they act as though nothing horrible has happened, continuing to offer Ben gifts. The film crew disposes of the body for Ben.

After a victim flees before he can be killed, Ben is arrested, but he escapes. At this point, someone, presumably the brother of the dead Italian along with other members of the two dead Italians' criminal organization, starts taking revenge on Ben and his family. Ben discovers that his girlfriend Valérie has been killed: a flutist, she has been murdered in a particularly humiliating manner, with her flute inserted into her anus. He later finds that his parents met the same fate, with his mother, who owns a shop and is "not a musician", being sodomized with the end of a broomstick. This prompts Ben to decide that he must leave. He meets the camera crew to say farewell, but in the middle of reciting a poem, he is abruptly shot dead by an off-camera gunman. The camera crew is then picked off one by one. After the camera falls, it keeps running, and the film ends with the death of the fleeing sound recordist.

== Cast ==
- Benoît Poelvoorde as Ben
- Valérie Parent as Valérie
- Rémy Belvaux as Rémy (Reporter)
- André Bonzel as André (Cameraman)
- Jean-Marc Chenut as Patrick (Sound Man #1)
- Alain Oppezzi as Franco (Sound Man #2)
- Vincent Tavier as Vincent (Sound Man #3)

== Production ==
Man Bites Dog was shot in black and white on 16 mm film and was produced on a shoestring budget by four student filmmakers, led by director Rémy Belvaux. The film's writers, Belvaux, Poelvoorde and Bonzel, all appear in the film using their own first names: Poelvoorde as Ben, the killer; Belvaux as Rémy, the director; and Bonzel as André, the camera operator. The genesis of the idea came from shooting a documentary without any money.

The film's French title, which translates to "It Happened in Your Neighborhood", is taken from a column in the Belgian daily newspaper Le Soir dedicated to trivial local news.

Benoit Poelvoorde's parents and grandparents were portrayed by his real relatives. They thought they were filming a documentary on Benoit, and had no idea that the footage was going to be used in a film in which he is a serial killer.

Ben's cocktail "Petit Grégory" is a reference to an actual murder case in France that involved the killing of the 4-year-old Grégory who was found floating in a river with his hands and legs tied (much like the olive in the cocktail that is tied to a sugar cube).

== Release ==
Man Bites Dog premiered in the International Critics' Week section at the 1992 Cannes Film Festival. Though there was some outrage towards the film for its violence, it won the International Critics' Prize, the SACD award for Best Feature and the Special Award of the Youth for directors Rémy Belvaux, André Bonzel and Benoît Poelvoorde. It went on to play the Toronto International Film Festival on September 12, 1992, as well as the New York Film Festival on October 9.

=== Box office ===
The film grossed $1.2 million in Belgium and more than $2 million in France. In the United States and Canada it grossed $205,569.

=== Controversy ===
The film faced bans in some countries due to its violent content, particularly for a graphic scene involving a gang rape. For this scene, the film was banned in Sweden. During the UK release, British tabloids called for the picture to be banned from UK cinemas, along with the films Reservoir Dogs and Bad Lieutenant. Despite protests, the film was able to secure an 18 certificate and was released uncut to home video by Tartan Films. When asked about the BBFC’s decision for the rating, then-chief executive James Ferman said, "Man Bites Dog was actually passed for film and video last year, before recent concerns about the violence under-age children could be seeing on video", but added, "We did think that as the film was a subtitled, grainy, black-and-white, low-budget student film for adults it would go to self-selected audience. Also the genre is black comedy, where the deliberate excessiveness of the violence is the joke." In 2003, the film was banned in Ireland.

Although it is never shown or suggested in the film itself that Benoit kills a baby, the original poster features an image of a baby's pacifier with spattering blood coming from an unseen target at the end of Benoit's gun. For foreign release posters (not including the Region 4/Australian release), the baby's pacifier was changed to a set of dentures.

In Australia, the uncut version was initially refused classification by the Australian Classification Board for the scene of "sexual violence." After removal of the rape scene, the film was given an R classification. This edited version was released to home video in Australia in late 1993 by 21st Century Films. The uncut version was finally passed in Australia in 2025, for a Blu-ray release by Imprint Films.

In the U.S., Man Bites Dog was given an NC-17 by the Motion Picture Association of America for "strong graphic violence". It played in one theater and was distributed by Roxie Releasing. To ensure availability in video rental store chains which do not stock NC-17 films, cuts were made to the film to secure an unrated rating. The unrated version removes the rape scene and edited other violent scenes to be less graphic.

== Reception ==
=== Critical response ===
On review aggregator Rotten Tomatoes, Man Bites Dog holds an approval rating of 68%, based on 19 reviews, and an average rating of 7.1/10. Metacritic, which uses a weighted average, assigned the film a score of 67 out of 100, based on 22 critics, indicating "generally favorable" reviews.

Kenneth Turan of the Los Angeles Times highly praised the film upon its release, writing, "Man Bites Dog defines audacity. An assured, seductive chamber of horrors, it marries nightmare with humor and then abruptly takes the laughter away. Intentionally disturbing, it is close to the last word about the nature of violence on film, a troubling, often funny vision of what the movies have done to our souls.... The deserving winner of the International Critics Award at Cannes ..." Film critic Rob Gonsalves called the film "[an] original, a stark and (sorry) biting work far more complex, both stylistically and thematically, than first meets the eye." Stephen Holden of The New York Times called the film "a grisly sick joke of a film that some will find funny, others simply appalling." Holden concluded his review by stating that the film "gets carried away with its own cleverness. It makes the audience the butt of a nasty practical joke."

In 2015, Taste of Cinema ranked the film 19th among the "30 Great Psychopath Movies That Are Worth Your Time".

== Honors and awards ==
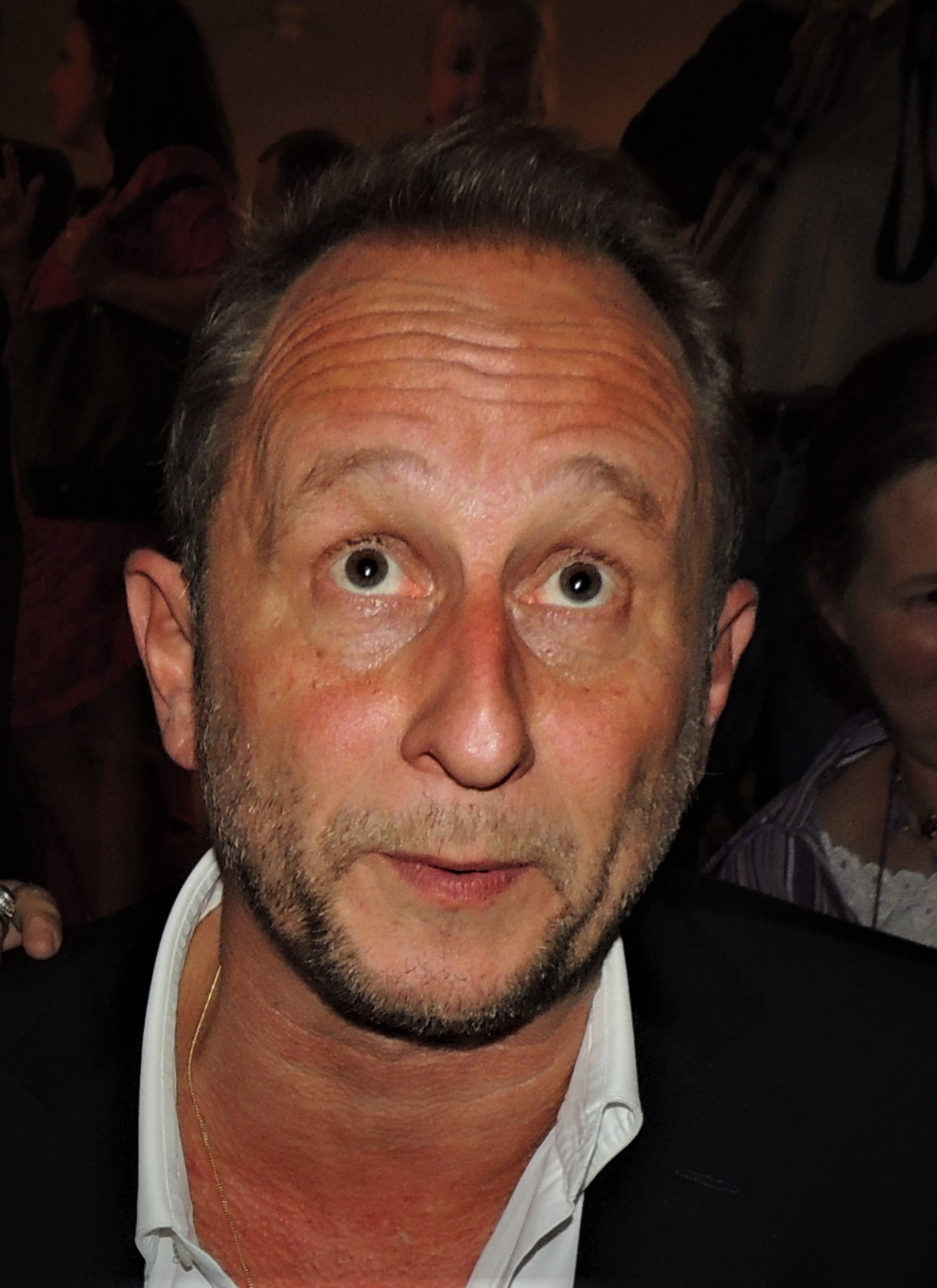
Benoit Poelvoorde (p. 2013) won the Best Actor Award at the 1992 Sitges Film Festival for his role in Man Bites Dog.

=== Awards ===
- 1992 Cannes Film Festival
  - Award of the Youth
  - International Critics' Prize
- 1992 Sitges Film Festival
  - Best Film Award
  - Best Actor Award (Benoit Poelvoorde)
- 1992 André Cavens Award
- 1992 Toronto International Film Festival
  - Metro Media Award
- 1993 European Film Awards
  - Best Film Award nomination
- 1993 Saturn Awards
  - Best Genre Video Release nomination
- 1993 French Syndicate of Cinema Critics
  - Best Foreign Film

== Legacy ==
Among the film's admirers are Steve Buscemi, who named Man Bites Dog as part of his top 10 films in The Criterion Collection, and Quentin Tarantino, who attended the very first screening with Buscemi at the 1992 Cannes Film Festival and "absolutely loved the movie". When Tarantino tried to attend the second screening, he could not get past the security guard. Tarantino took a swing at the guard, whereupon five guards wrestled Tarantino to the floor. The movie was an influence on Tarantino's story for Natural Born Killers, released in 1994, with Tarantino stating the film did "exactly what I was trying to do in the original Natural Born Killers."

The film is included among the "1001 Movies You Must See Before You Die", edited by Steven Jay Schneider.

Writing for MTV, Sacha Howells said, "If anything, the film's comment on how documentaries and reality TV manipulate misery and violence for entertainment value is even more relevant now. Man Bites Dog premiered the same year that the first Real World episodes aired, before the dozens of increasingly extreme shows that have come since…The disturbing film they left behind has more meaning today than it did when it was made, an indictment of a celebrity-obsessed culture that considers anyone in front of a camera to be a star."

Writing about the film for The A.V. Club in 2010, Scott Tobias said, "Five years before Michael Haneke’s even nastier Funny Games, Man Bites Dog also implicates the audience for watching it—a stand that has naturally made both films extremely polarizing. When Rémy talks about never having enough [salacious content], it isn’t just the filmmakers who are guilty of insatiable bloodlust, but the unseen audience that regularly seeks out violence and mayhem as entertainment." He also noted the film "forcefully reveals the lie of documentary 'objectivity,' this false notion that filmmakers can be flies on the wall and record life as it really happens." He concluded, "Though time has made the big shocks in Man Bites Dog seem a little quaint—the careers of Haneke, Gaspar Noé, and Takashi Miike hastened that inevitability—the film looks wiser and more prescient now than it did in 1992. Back then, most of the arguments about the film centered on whether it should even exist; before you could even broach a discussion about themes, you first had to come to terms with the nearly unprecedented horror of the rape scene, or the bleak comedy of bodies piling up without consequence. Today, it doesn’t look like provocation for provocation’s sake; it’s a thoughtful, evergreen thesis on documentary 'reality' and the grotesque distortions of the movie camera. It’s even possible to laugh about it now. Sicko."

For the film's 30th anniversary in 2021, Luiz H.C. of Bloody Disgusting discussed the film's impact, noting its influence on subsequent mockumentaries such as Behind the Mask: The Rise of Leslie Vernon and What We Do in the Shadows. He contended that the film's "horrific subject matter isn’t actually gratuitous" and does serve a narrative purpose, and is "never romanticized or even stylized like you might see in a Slasher flick, with the filmmakers always choosing to depict them as sudden and messy, making the entire experience feel like one excruciatingly long snuff film." He added the film's "gritty photography…helps to hammer home [its] brutal realism, with the hard shadows and lack of color making the Belgian setting look hopeless and dreary as Ben goes about his nihilistic shenanigans."

== Home media ==
The directors' cut of Man Bites Dog was released on LaserDisc in the United States in December 1993. In 2002, Man Bites Dog was released on DVD uncut as a part of The Criterion Collection with spine #165. The Criterion DVD restores scenes that were removed in edited versions and includes English-language interviews with Belvaux, Bonzel, and Poelvoorde.

== See also ==
- List of films featuring psychopaths and sociopaths
- List of cult films
