= André Bonzel =

French film director and screenwriter

André Bonzel (born 31 May 1961) is a French film director, screenwriter and producer. He directed alongside Rémy Belvaux and Benoît Poelvoorde the 1992 black comedy film Man Bites Dog, which was met with high praise from film critics and has soon become a cult film. It received the André Cavens Award for Best Film given by the Belgian Film Critics Association (UCC).
