= Fernando Solanas =

Argentine film director (1936–2020)

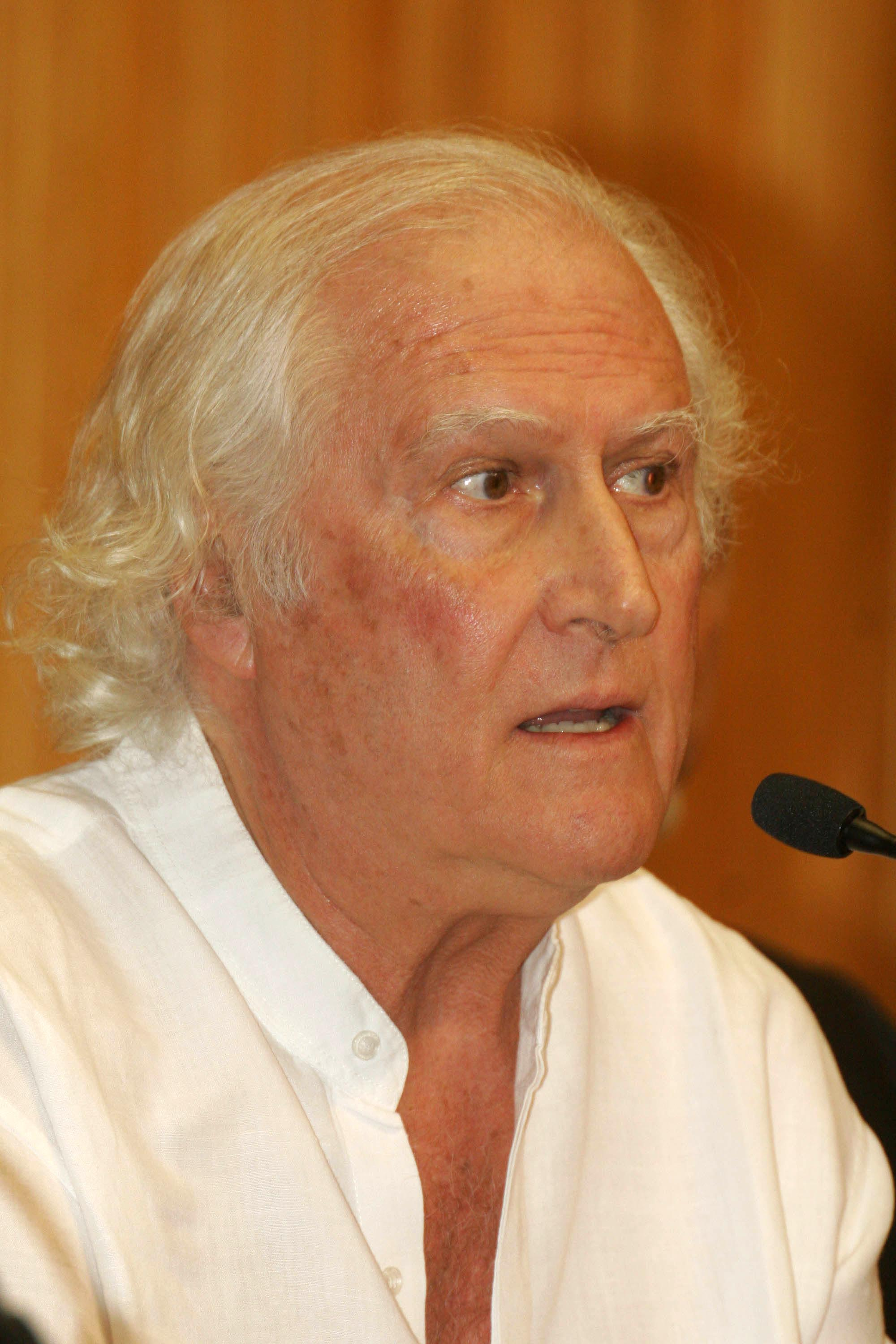
- Solanas at the Guadalajara Film Festival, 2008

Argentine Ambassador to UNESCO
- In office 10 December 2019 – 6 November 2020
- Preceded by: Rodolfo Terragno
- Succeeded by: Marcela Losardo

National Senator
- In office 10 December 2013 – 10 December 2019
- Constituency: City of Buenos Aires

National Deputy
- In office 10 December 2009 – 10 December 2013
- Constituency: City of Buenos Aires

Personal details
- Born: 16 February 1936 Olivos, Buenos Aires, Argentina
- Died: 6 November 2020 (aged 84) Neuilly-sur-Seine, France
- Cause of death: COVID-19
- Party: Broad Front (1993–1994); Proyecto Sur (2007–2020)
- Other political affiliations: South Alliance (1995); Broad Front UNEN (2013–2015); Creo (2017); Frente de Todos (2019–2020)
- Occupation: Film director; screenwriter; politician

Fernando Ezequiel "Pino" Solanas (16 February 1936 – 6 November 2020) was an Argentine film director, screenwriter, score composer and politician. His films include; La hora de los hornos (The Hour of the Furnaces) (1968), Tangos: el exilio de Gardel (1985), Sur (1988), The Journey (1992), The Cloud (1998) and Memoria del saqueo (2004), among many others. He was National Senator representing the Autonomous City of Buenos Aires for six years, from 2013 to 2019.

Solanas studied theatre, music, and law. In 1962, he directed his first short feature Seguir andando and in 1968 he covertly produced and directed his first long feature film La Hora de los Hornos, a documentary on neo-colonialism and violence in Latin America. The film won several international awards and was screened around the world. Solanas won the Grand Jury Prize and the Critics Award at the Venice Film Festival and the Prix de la mise en scène at the Cannes Film Festival. In 1999 he was the president of the jury at the 21st Moscow International Film Festival. He was awarded a special Honorary Golden Bear at the 2004 Berlin Film Festival. He collaborated with tango composer and musician Ástor Piazzolla on the soundtracks for various movies.

== Background ==
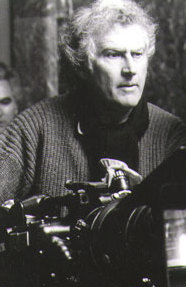
Solanas on the set of Tangos: el exilio de Gardel, 1985.

Solanas was at the forefront of the Grupo Cine Liberación which shook Argentine cinema during the 1970s, developing its social conscience and political voice. He was active in the campaign to support Perón. Threatened by right-wing forces in the 1970s, one of his actors was assassinated and he himself was almost kidnapped.

Together with Octavio Getino, Solanas wrote the manifesto "Toward a Third Cinema". The idea of a political Third Cinema, opposed to Hollywood cinema and European auteur cinema, inspired film makers in many so-called developing countries.

Solanas went into exile in Paris in 1976, only returning to Argentina with the arrival of democracy in 1983.

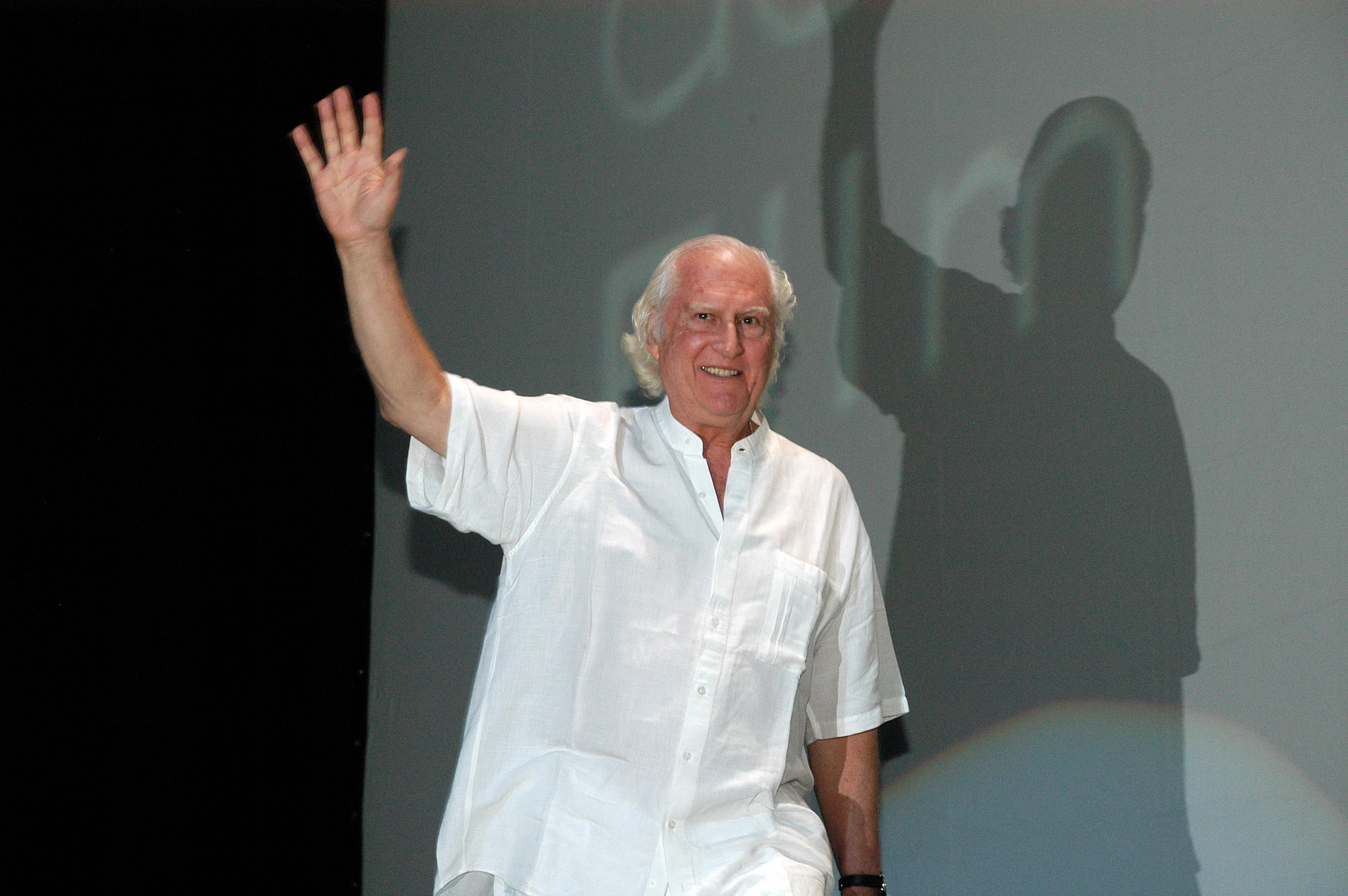
Solanas accepting a Silver Mayahuel award at the Guadalajara Film Festival, 2008.

== Political career ==
Solanas continued to make political films and was an outspoken critic of Carlos Menem, the Argentine President. Three days after such a public criticism, on 21 May 1991, Solanas was shot six times in his legs. Those responsible were never caught but Solanas always thought that Menem was behind it. Despite dealing with the attack and disability, Solanas became even more involved in politics and stood to be a Senator for Buenos Aires, receiving 7% of the vote in 1992. A year later he was elected a National Deputy for the Frente Grande list, although he left the party after a year.

Solanas continued to write and direct, including the 2005 film La Dignidad de los Nadies and the 2008 film La última estación. His son, Juan Solanas, is also a noted film director.

In October 2007, Solanas was presidential candidate in the 2007 Argentine general election for the Authentic Socialist Party. He became the 5th most voted candidate, with 1.58% of the vote.

In 2009, Solanas was elected as a National Deputy for the city of Buenos Aires in the June 28th parliamentary elections, as his party Proyecto Sur attained the second largest political representation in the city by collecting 24.2% of the votes. In 2013, Solanas was elected National Senator, representing Buenos Aires City from 2013 to 2019.

In 2018 Solanas was vehemently for the legalization of abortion, claiming that sexual pleasure is a "fundamental human right".

In 2019, following the end of his term as senator, he was appointed as Argentina's ambassador to UNESCO; he served in the position until his death from COVID-19 in Neuilly-sur-Seine, France, on 6 November 2020, during the COVID-19 pandemic in France.

== Filmography ==
- Seguir andando (1962) (short)
- Reflexión ciudadana (1963) (short)
- La hora de los hornos (The Hour of the Furnaces) (1968)
- Argentina, Mayo de 1969: los caminos de la liberación (1969)
- Perón, la revolución justicialista (1971)
- Perón: actualización política y doctrinaria para la toma del poder (1971)
- Los hijos de fierro (1972)
- La mirada de los otros (1980) Filmed in Paris, France
- El exilio de Gardel (Tangos) (1985)
- Sur (1988)
- The Journey (1992)
- The Cloud (1998)
- Afrodita, el sabor del amor (2001)
- Memoria del saqueo (2004)
- La dignidad de los nadies (2005)
- Argentina latente (2007)
- La próxima estación (2008)
- Tierra Sublevada: Oro Puro (2009)
- Tierra Sublevada: Oro Nego (2011)
- La guerra del fracking (2013)
- El legado estratégico de Juan Perón (2016)
- Viaje a los pueblos fumigados (2018)
- Tres en la deriva del acto creativo (2021)

== Accolades ==
Awards and Nominations
Ceremony	Year	Category	Results
Venice Film Festival	1985	Grand Special Jury Prize	Won
Venice Film Festival	1998	CinemAvvenire Award (Best Film in Competition)	Won
Venice Film Festival	1998	Golden Lion	Nominated
Venice Film Festival	1998	UNESCO Award - Special Mention	Won
Venice Film Festival	2005	Award of the City of Rome (Best Film)	Won
Venice Film Festival	2005	Doc/It Award	Won
Venice Film Festival	2005	Human Rights Film Network Award	Won
Montréal World Film Festival	2001	Grand Prix Special des Amériques	Won
Mar del Plata Film Festival	2004	Best Film	Nominated
Mannheim-Heidelberg International Filmfestival	1968	Interfilm Award	Won
Havana Film Festival	2007	Special Jury Prize (Documentary)	Won
Havana Film Festival	2005	Memoria Documentary Award	Won
Havana Film Festival	2005	Saúl Yelín Award	Won
Havana Film Festival	1998	CARACOL Award	Won
Havana Film Festival	1998	Honorary Award	Won
Havana Film Festival	1998	Saúl Yelín Award	Won
Havana Film Festival	1992	Special Jury Prize	Won
Havana Film Festival	1988	Grand Coral - First Prize	Won
Havana Film Festival	1985	Grand Coral - First Prize	Won
Gramado Film Festival	1992	Golden Kikito (Best Ibero-American Film (Melhor Filme)	Nominated
Cannes Film Festival	1992	Golden Palm	Nominated
Cannes Film Festival	1992	Prize of the Ecumenical Jury - Special Mention	Won
Cannes Film Festival	1992	Technical Grand Prize	Won
Cannes Film Festival	1990	Audience Award	Won
Cannes Film Festival	1989	Audience Award	Won
Cannes Film Festival	1988	Best Director	Won
Cannes Film Festival	1988	Golden Palm	Nominated
British Film Institute Awards	1972	Sutherland Trophy	Won
Berlin International Film Festival	2004	Honorary Golden Berlin Bear	Won
Berlin International Film Festival	1971	FIPRESCI Prize - Special Mention	Won
Argentinean Film Critics Association Awards	2010	Silver Condor (Best Documentary Feature (Mejor Largometraje Documental))	Nominated
Argentinean Film Critics Association Awards	2009	Silver Condor (Best Documentary Feature (Mejor Largometraje Documental))	Nominated
Argentinean Film Critics Association Awards	2009	Silver Condor (Best Editing (Mejor Montaje))	Nominated
Argentinean Film Critics Association Awards	2009	Silver Condor (Best Screenplay, Documentary (Mejor Guión Largometraje Documental))	Nominated
Argentinean Film Critics Association Awards	2008	Silver Condor (Best Documentary Feature (Mejor Largometraje Documental))	Nominated
Argentinean Film Critics Association Awards	2006	Silver Condor (Best Documentary (Mejor Documental))	Nominated
Argentinean Film Critics Association Awards	2006	Silver Condor (Best Screenplay, Documentary (Mejor Guión Documental))	Nominated
Argentinean Film Critics Association Awards	2005	Silver Condor (Best Documentary (Mejor Largometraje Documental)	Nominated
Argentinean Film Critics Association Awards	2005	Silver Condor (Best Screenplay, Feature-Length Documentary (Mejor Guión Largometraje Documental))	Nominated
Argentinean Film Critics Association Awards	1999	Silver Condor (Best Director (Mejor Director))	Nominated
Argentinean Film Critics Association Awards	1987	Silver Condor (Best Director (Mejor Director))	Won
Argentinean Film Critics Association Awards	1987	Silver Condor (Best Music (Mejor Música))	Won
Academy of Motion Picture Arts and Sciences of Argentina	2009	Award of the Argentinean Academy (Best Documentary)	Nominated
Academy of Motion Picture Arts and Sciences of Argentina	2008	Award of the Argentinean Academy (Best Documentary)	Won

== Quotes ==
"The possibility of making a new cinema completely outside the system depends on whether or not filmmakers can transform themselves from 'directors' into total filmmakers. And no one can become a total filmmaker without being a film technician, without being capable of handling the production."

"We realized that the important thing was not the film itself but that which the film provoked."[7]
