= Rémy Belvaux =

Belgian actor and director (1966–2006)

- Born: Rémy Nicolas Lucien Belvaux; 10 November 1966; Namur, Belgium
- Died: 4 September 2006 (aged 39); Orry-la-Ville, France
- Occupations: Director, screenwriter, actor

Rémy Nicolas Lucien Belvaux (10 November 1966 – 4 September 2006) was a Belgian actor, director, producer and screenwriter. He was the brother of Lucas Belvaux, also an actor and film director, and of Bruno Belvaux, a theater director.

In 1992, he was with André Bonzel and Benoît Poelvoorde, director, producer and actor of the feature film Man Bites Dog. This film, which was his most famous movie, and originally titled "C'est arrivé près de chez vous" (translated as: "It happened near your home") (1992), is about a camera crew filming a documentary about the life of a serial killer. Belvaux plays one of the journalists. The film won the Special Jury Prize for Belvaux and Bonzel at the 5th Yubari International Fantastic Film Festival in February 1994 and the André Cavens Award for Best Film.

He died by suicide on 4 September 2006.

== Confrontation with Bill Gates ==
On 4 February 1998 he was in a four-person gang (alongside Noël Godin and Jan Bucquoy), all of whom were fined for throwing a cream pie in the face of the American businessman and Microsoft founder, Bill Gates, who was on a visit to Brussels at the time.
