= 12th César Awards =

1987 French film awards ceremony

- Date: 7 March 1987
- Site: Palais des Congrès, Paris, France
- Hosted by: Michel Drucker and Pierre Tchernia

Highlights
- Best Film: Thérèse
- Best Actor: Daniel Auteuil
- Best Actress: Sabine Azéma

Television coverage
- Network: Antenne 2

The 12th César Awards ceremony, presented by the Académie des Arts et Techniques du Cinéma, honoured the best French films of 1986 and took place on 7 March 1987 at the Palais des Congrès in Paris. The ceremony was chaired by Sean Connery and hosted by Michel Drucker and Pierre Tchernia. Thérèse won the award for Best Film.

== Winners and nominees ==
The winners are highlighted in bold:

- Best Film:
  **Thérèse**, directed by Alain Cavalier
  37°2 le matin, directed by Jean-Jacques Beineix
  Jean de Florette, directed by Claude Berri
  Mélo, directed by Alain Resnais
  Tenue de soirée, directed by Bertrand Blier
- Best Foreign Film:
  **Der Name der Rose**, directed by Jean-Jacques Annaud
  After Hours, directed by Martin Scorsese
  Hannah and Her Sisters, directed by Woody Allen
  The Mission, directed by Roland Joffé
  Out of Africa, directed by Sydney Pollack
- Best First Work:
  **La Femme de ma vie**, directed by Régis Wargnier
  Black Mic Mac, directed by Thomas Gilou
  Je hais les acteurs, directed by Gérard Krawczyk
  Noir et blanc, directed by Claire Devers
- Best Actor:
  **Daniel Auteuil**, for Jean de Florette
  Jean-Hugues Anglade, for 37°2 le matin
  Christophe Malavoy, for La Femme de ma vie
  André Dussollier, for Mélo
  Michel Blanc, for Tenue de soirée
- Best Actress:
  **Sabine Azéma**, for Mélo
  Béatrice Dalle, for 37°2 le matin
  Jane Birkin, for La Femme de ma vie
  Juliette Binoche, for Mauvais sang
  Miou-Miou, for Tenue de soirée
- Best Supporting Actor:
  **Pierre Arditi**, for Mélo
  Gérard Darmon, for 37°2 le matin
  Jean-Louis Trintignant, for La Femme de ma vie
  Jean Carmet, for Les Fugitifs
  Claude Piéplu, for Le Paltoquet
- Best Supporting Actress:
  **Emmanuelle Béart**, for Manon des sources
  Clémentine Célarié, for 37°2 le matin
  Marie Dubois, for Descente aux enfers
  Danielle Darrieux, for Le Lieu du crime
  Jeanne Moreau, for Le Paltoquet
- Most Promising Actor:
  **Isaach De Bankolé**, for Black Mic Mac
  Rémi Martin, for Conseil de famille
  Jean-Philippe Écoffey, for Gardien de la nuit
  Cris Campion, for Pirates
- Most Promising Actress:
  **Catherine Mouchet**, for Thérèse
  Dominique Blanc, for La Femme de ma vie
  Julie Delpy, for Mauvais sang
  Marianne Basler, for Rosa la rose, fille publique
- Best Director:
  **Alain Cavalier**, for Thérèse
  Jean-Jacques Beineix, for 37°2 le matin
  Claude Berri, for Jean de Florette
  Alain Resnais, for Mélo
  Bertrand Blier, for Tenue de soirée
- Best Original Screenplay or Adaptation:
  **Alain Cavalier, Camille de Casabianca**, for Thérèse
  Francis Veber, for Les Fugitifs
  Claude Berri, Gérard Brach, for Jean de Florette
  Bertrand Blier, for Tenue de soirée
- Best Cinematography:
  **Philippe Rousselot**, for Thérèse
  Bruno Nuytten, for Jean de Florette
  Jean-Yves Escoffier, for Mauvais sang
  Charles Van Damme, for Mélo
- Best Costume Design:
  **Anthony Powell**, for Pirates
  Catherine Leterrier, for Mélo
  Yvette Bonnay, for Thérèse
- Best Sound:
  **Bernard Leroux, Claude Villand, Michel Desrois, William Flageollet**, for 'Round Midnight
  Pierre Gamet, Laurent Quaglio, Dominique Hennequin, for Jean de Florette
  Dominique Hennequin, Bernard Bats, for Tenue de soirée
  Alain Lachassagne, Dominique Dalmasso, for Thérèse
- Best Editing:
  **Isabelle Dedieu**, for Thérèse
  Armand Psenny, for Round Midnight
  Monique Prim, for 37°2 le matin
  Claudine Merlin, for Tenue de soirée
- Best Music:
  **Herbie Hancock**, for 'Round Midnight
  Gabriel Yared, for 37°2 le matin
  Jean-Claude Petit, for Jean de Florette
  Serge Gainsbourg, for Tenue de soirée
- Best Production Design:
  **Pierre Guffroy**, for Pirates
  Alexandre Trauner, for 'Round Midnight
  Jacques Saulnier, for Mélo
  Bernard Evein, for Thérèse
- Best Fiction Short Film:
  **La Goula**, directed by Roger Guillot
  Alger la blanche, directed by Cyril Collard
  Les Arcandiers, directed by Manuel Sanchez
  Bel ragazzo, directed by Georges Bensoussan
  Belle de jour, directed by Henri Gruvman
  Bocetta revient de guerre, directed by Jean-Pierre Sinapi
  Le Bridge, directed by Gilles Dagneau
- Honorary César:
  **Etablissement cinématographique des Armées**
  **Yves Allégret** - Posthumously
  **Jean Gabin** - Posthumously
  **Jean-Luc Godard**

== See also ==
- 59th Academy Awards
- 40th British Academy Film Awards
