= Language is a Virus =

Language is a Virus may refer to:

- "Language is a Virus", a song by Laurie Anderson
- a concept in the William S. Burroughs novel The Ticket That Exploded and essay collection, The Electronic Revolution, which is quoted in the Anderson song.

== See also ==
- Memetics, Richard Dawkins' theory suggesting that cultural information is transmitted among people in a virus-like fashion
