= The Electronic Revolution =

1971 book by William S. Burroughs

- 1971 Blackmoor Press paperback edition
- Author: William S. Burroughs
- Language: English
- Genre: Essay collection
- Publisher: Expanded Media Editions
- Publication date: 1970
- Publication place: United Kingdom, West Germany
- Media type: Print (Paperback)

The Electronic Revolution is an essay collection by William S. Burroughs that was first published in 1970 by Expanded Media Editions in West Germany. A second edition, published in 1971 in Cambridge, England, contained additional French translation by Henri Chopin.

The book is available in its entirety in later editions of The Job, a book of interviews conducted by Daniel Odier that elaborate on the topics contained therein, and was also published by online services.

== The book ==
The book is divided into two parts.

Part one, entitled "The Feedback from Watergate to the Garden of Eden", invokes Alfred Korzybski’s views characterising man as "the time binding machine" due to his ability to write. Burroughs sees the significance of a written word as a distinguishing feature of human beings which enables them to transform and convey information to future generations. He proposes the theory of "the unrecognised virus" present in the language, suggesting that, "the word has not been recognised as a virus because it has achieved a state of stable symbiosis with the host."

Part two, "Electronic Revolution", concerns the power of alphabetic non-pictorial languages to control people. It draws attention to the subversive influence of the word virus on humans and dangerous possibilities of using human voice as a weapon. Recording words on tape recorders and employing the Cut-up technique can easily lead to the false news broadcasts or garbled political speeches causing confusion and psychic control over individuals.

The basic idea of language as a virus has been widely used and quoted from several of Burroughs' interviews. Here is a passage from the text:

I suggest that the spoken word as we know it came after the written word. (...) we may forget that a written word is an image and that written words are images in sequence that is to say moving pictures. (...) My basis theory is that the written word was literally a virus that made the spoken word possible. Doktor Kurt Unruh von Steinplatz has put forward an interesting theory as to the origins and history of this word virus. He postulates that the word was a virus of what he calls biologic mutation effecting a biologic change in its host which was then genetically conveyed. One reason that apes cannot talk is because the structure of their inner throats is simply not designed to formulate words. He postulates that alteration in inner throat structure were occasioned by a virus illness ....

The referred German Doktor Kurt Unruh von Steinplatz is another of Burroughs' inventions.

== Influence ==
The book influenced numerous musicians in the industrial music scene of the 1970s. Richard H. Kirk, of Cabaret Voltaire, employed many ideas and methods from the book, saying, "A lot of what we did, especially in the early days, was a direct application of his ideas to sound and music." He described it as "a handbook of how to use tape recorders in a crowd ... to promote a sense of unease or unrest by playback of riot noises cut in with random recordings of the crowd itself."
