= Hors-la-loi =

Hors-la-loi means outlaw in French.

It may refer to:

- Hors-la-loi (Lucky Luke), 6th book in the Lucky Luke comic series
- Hors-la-loi (1985 film), a film by Robin Davis
- Outside the Law (2010 film), a film by Rachid Bouchareb, French title being Hors la loi
