= Mortal Transfer =

2001 film by Jean-Jacques Beineix

Mortel Transfert
- Theatrical release poster
- Directed by: Jean-Jacques Beineix
- Written by: Jean-Jacques Beineix
- Based on: Mortel Transfert by Jean-Pierre Gattégno
- Produced by: Reinhard Kloos
- Starring: Jean-Hugues Anglade; Hélène de Fougerolles
- Cinematography: Benoît Delhomme
- Edited by: Yves Deschamps; Kako Kelber
- Music by: Reinhardt Wagner
- Distributed by: UGC Fox Distribution
- Release date: 10 January 2001
- Running time: 122 minutes
- Countries: France; Germany
- Language: French
- Budget: $8.1 million
- Box office: $2 million

Mortel Transfert (also known as Mortal Transfer) is a 2001 thriller film written and directed by Jean-Jacques Beineix, adapted from the novel of the same name by Jean-Pierre Gattégno. The music was provided by Reinhardt Wagner, the composer of Roselyne and the Lions. It was Beineix's final theatrical film before his death.

== Plot ==
A psychoanalyst is conversing with one of his patients and dozes off while she is talking. When he wakes up, she is lying dead on the couch, forcing him to dispose of her body without getting seen. Moreover, her husband suspects her of stealing money from him.

== Cast ==
- Jean-Hugues Anglade as Michel Durand
- Hélène de Fougerolles as Olga Kubler
- Miki Manojlovic as Erostrate
- Valentina Sauca as Hélène Maier
- Robert Hirsch as Armand Slibovic
- Yves Rénier as Max Kubler
- Catherine Mouchet as The professor of maths
- Denis Podalydès as Commissioner Chapireau
- Riton Liebman as The disc-jockey
- Laurent Bateau as The young depressive man

== Release ==
The film was screened in the Panorama section at the 51st Berlin International Film Festival.

== Reception ==
Benny Crick of Screen International described the film as "a disappointingly minor excursion into black comedy-cum-psycho-thriller territory." He added, "Taken at its most undemanding level of entertainment, the film's macabre farce and its cast of eccentrics are mildly amusing, but Beineix is unable to fuse the story's psychoanalytical trappings and the clunky graveside humour." Lisa Nesselson of Variety stated, "By modern standards, his visual approach no longer seems so fresh and daring, but the level of craft is still unmistakable, and wintry streets with convincing fake snow contribute to the chilly atmosphere."
