= Luc Thuillier =

French film and television actor (born 1964)

- Born: October 24, 1964 (age 60); Villemomble, France
- Occupation: Actor
- Years active: 1985–present

Luc Thuillier (born October 24, 1964, in Villemomble, France) is a French film and television actor.

== Filmography ==
=== Film ===
- 1985 : Hors-la-loi by Robin Davis with Clovis Cornillac
- 1985 : Rouge baiser by Véra Belmont with Lambert Wilson
- 1986 : Cours privé by Pierre Granier-Deferre with Élizabeth Bourgine
- 1988 : Il y a maldonne by John Berry with Clovis Cornillac and Myriam Boyer
- 1988 : Les Années sandwiches by Pierre Boutron with Thomas Langmann
- 1988 : L'Autre nuit by Jean-Pierre Limosin with Julie Delpy
- 1989 : Cher frangin by Gérard Mordillat with Julie Jézéquel
- 1989 : Monsieur Hire by Patrice Leconte, after a novel by Georges Simenon
- 1989 : Un Père et passe by Sébastien Grall with Eddy Mitchell
- 1989 : J'aurais jamais dû croiser son regard de Jean-Marc Longval avec Smaïn
- 1990 : Dédé by Jean-Louis Benoît : Dédé
- 1991 : Toujours seuls by Gérard Mordillat with Annie Girardot
- 1991 : La vieille qui marchait dans la mer by Laurent Heynemann with Jeanne Moreau and Michel Serrault
- 1993 : En Compagnie d'Antonin Artaud by Gérard Mordillat with Sami Frey
- 1996 : Le Jaguar by Francis Veber with Jean Reno and Patrick Bruel
- 1999 : Paddy by Gérard Mordillat with Julie Gayet
- 2005 : La Trahison by Philippe Faucon with Patrick Descamps
- 2006 : Le Passager de l'été by Florence Moncorgé-Gabin with François Berléand and Catherine Frot
- 2006 : A City Is Beautiful at Night by Richard Bohringer with Romane Bohringer
- 2007 : Le Candidat by Niels Arestrup with Yvan Attal
- 2008 : Les Liens du sang

=== Television ===
- 1989 : David Lansky (1 episode)
- 1989 : Pause café (1 episode)
- 1990 : V comme vengeance by Luc Béraud
- 1993 : Léïla née en France by Miguel Courtois
- 1993 : Chambre froide by Sylvain Madigan
- 1994 : L'Instit (1 episode)
- 1994 : La Guerre des privés (3 episodes)
- 1995 : Pour une vie ou deux by Marc Angelo
- 1996 : Maigret (1 episode)
- 1996 : La Guerre des moutons by Rémy Burkel
- 1997 : Aventurier malgré lui by Marc Rivière
- 1998 : De gré ou de force by Fabrice Cazeneuve
- 1999 : Le secret de Saint-Junien by Christiane Spiero
- 1999 : Justice
- 1999 : La petite fille en costume marin by Marc Rivière
- 2000 : Marie-Tempête by Denis Malleval
- 2000 : Sandra et les siens (1 episode)
- 2001 : L'Apprentissage de la ville by Gérard Mordillat
- 2002 : Le juge est une femme (3 episodes)
- 2003 : L'Île atlantique by Gérard Mordillat
- 2003 : Simon le juste by Gérard Mordillat
- 2003 : Central Nuit (1 episode)
- 2003 : Les Cordier, juge et flic (1 episode)
- 2005 : Le Tuteur (1 episode)
- 2005 : Dolmen by Didier Albert
- 2006 : Julie Lescaut (1 episode)
- 2006-2010 : Les Bleus: premiers pas dans la police (22 episodes)
- 2010 : Les Vivants et les morts by Gérard Mordillat
- 2011 : Profilage (1 episode)
