= Roselyne and the Lions =

- Directed by: Jean-Jacques Beineix
- Written by: Jean-Jacques Beineix; Jacques Forgeas; Thierry Le Portier
- Starring: Isabelle Pasco; Gérard Sandoz
- Cinematography: Jean-François Robin
- Edited by: Anick Baly; Marie Castro; Danielle Fillios
- Music by: Reinhardt Wagner
- Production companies: Cargo Films; Gaumont Production
- Distributed by: Gaumont Distribution
- Release date: 12 April 1989 (France)
- Running time: 113 minutes
- Country: France
- Language: French

Roselyne and the Lions (also known as Roselyne et les lions) is a 1989 French film directed by Jean-Jacques Beineix, starring Isabelle Pasco and Gérard Sandoz. It tells the story of a couple of circus workers.

== Plot ==
Thierry does odd jobs in a zoo in Marseille in exchange for lessons from Frazier the lion trainer. He meets Roselyne and they leave together to find work. They are taken on by a circus in Munich and achieve success as lion trainers when the trainer Klint loses his nerve.

== Cast ==
- Isabelle Pasco as Roselyne
- Gérard Sandoz as Thierry
- Gabriel Monnet as Frazier
- Philippe Clévenot as Bracquard
- Günter Meisner as Klint
- Wolf Harnisch as Koenig
- Jacques Le Carpentier as Markovitch
- Carlos Pavlidis as Petit Prince
- Jacques Mathou as Armani
- Dumitru Furdui as Stainer
- Jaroslav Vízner as Gunter
- Patrice Abbou as Ben Jemoul 2
- Silvio Bolino as Touron
- François Boum as Ben Jemoul 1
- Guillaume Briat as Matou

== Release ==
The film was screened at the 1989 Toronto International Film Festival and the 1989 Tokyo International Film Festival.

== Reception ==
Phil Powrie of British Film Institute commented that the film "tried to recapture what made Betty Blue so successful, with two young circus lion tamers in another doomed romance." He added, "Its shiny images seem now almost a parody of the cinéma du look, although the style echoes that of one of Beineix's mentors, Stanley Kubrick."
