= Jacques Mathou =

French actor

Jacques Mathou is a French actor, best known for his appearance in Delicatessen.

== Filmography ==
- 1985 : Tranches de vie
- 1986 : Betty Blue, Bob
- 1987 : L'été en pente douce
- 1987 : Si le soleil ne revenait pas
- 1989 : Roselyne and the Lions, Armani
- 1989 : Dédé, the priest
- 1990 : The Hairdresser's Husband, Mr Chardon
- 1991 : Delicatessen, Roger
- 1994 : Tombés du ciel, Policeman
- 1996 : Les Grands Ducs, Janvier
- 2011 : Voir la mer, Jacky Novion
- 2005 : La vie est à nous !, M. Antoine
- 2006 : My Best Friend, Bruno's father
