= National Society of Film Critics Award for Best Cinematography =

Annual US film award

The National Society of Film Critics Award for Best Cinematography is an annual award given by National Society of Film Critics to honor the best cinematographer of the year.

== Winners ==
=== 1960s ===
Year	Winner	Cinematographer(s)
1967	In the Heat of the Night	Haskell Wexler
1968	Bullitt	William A. Fraker
1969	The Wild Bunch	Lucien Ballard

=== 1970s ===
Year	Winner	Cinematographer(s)
1970	My Night at Maud's (Ma nuit chez Maud)	Néstor Almendros
1970	The Wild Child	Néstor Almendros
1971	The Conformist (Il conformista)	Vittorio Storaro
1972	Cries and Whispers (Viskningar och rop)	Sven Nykvist
1973	The Long Goodbye	Vilmos Zsigmond
1974	The Godfather Part II	Gordon Willis
1974	The Parallax View	Gordon Willis
1975	Barry Lyndon	John Alcott
1976	Bound for Glory	Haskell Wexler
1977	Aguirre, the Wrath of God (Aguirre, der Zorn Gottes)	Thomas Mauch
1978	Days of Heaven	Néstor Almendros
1979	Being There	Caleb Deschanel
1979	The Black Stallion	Caleb Deschanel

=== 1980s ===
Year	Winner	Cinematographer(s)
1980	Raging Bull	Michael Chapman
1981	Pennies from Heaven	Gordon Willis
1982	Diva	Philippe Rousselot
1983	Never Cry Wolf	Hiro Narita
1984	Comfort and Joy	Chris Menges
1984	The Killing Fields	Chris Menges
1985	Ran	Takao Saito, Masaharu Ueda, and Asakazu Nakai
1986	Blue Velvet	Frederick Elmes
1987	Hope and Glory	Philippe Rousselot
1988	Wings of Desire (Der Himmel über Berlin)	Henri Alekan
1989	The Fabulous Baker Boys	Michael Ballhaus

=== 1990s ===
Year	Winner	Cinematographer(s)
1990	Where the Heart Is	Peter Suschitzky
1991	Barton Fink	Roger Deakins
1992	Raise the Red Lantern (Da hong deng long gao gao gua)	Zhao Fei
1993	Schindler's List	Janusz Kamiński
1994	Ed Wood	Stefan Czapsky
1995	Devil in a Blue Dress	Tak Fujimoto
1996	Breaking the Waves	Robby Müller
1996	Dead Man	Robby Müller
1997	Kundun	Roger Deakins
1998	The Thin Red Line	John Toll
1999	American Beauty	Conrad L. Hall

=== 2000s ===
Year	Winner	Cinematographer(s)
2000	Beau Travail	Agnès Godard
2001	In the Mood for Love (Fa yeung nin wa)	Christopher Doyle and Pin Bing Lee
2002	Far from Heaven	Edward Lachman
2003	Master and Commander: The Far Side of the World	Russell Boyd
2004	House of Flying Daggers (Shi mian mai fu)	Xiaoding Zhao
2005	2046	Christopher Doyle, Lai Yiu Fai, and Kwan Pun Leung
2006	Children of Men	Emmanuel Lubezki
2007	There Will Be Blood	Robert Elswit
2008	Slumdog Millionaire	Anthony Dod Mantle
2009	The White Ribbon (Das weisse Band)	Christian Berger

=== 2010s ===
Year	Winner	Cinematographer(s)
2010	True Grit	Roger Deakins
2011	The Tree of Life	Emmanuel Lubezki
2012	The Master	Mihai Mălaimare Jr.
2013	Inside Llewyn Davis	Bruno Delbonnel
2014	Mr. Turner	Dick Pope
2015	Carol	Edward Lachman
2016	Moonlight	James Laxton
2017	Blade Runner 2049	Roger Deakins
2018	Roma	Alfonso Cuarón
2019	Atlantics	Claire Mathon
2019	Portrait of a Lady on Fire	Claire Mathon

=== 2020s ===
Year	Winner	Cinematographer(s)
2020	Nomadland	Joshua James Richards
2021	The Green Knight	Andrew Droz Palermo
2022	EO	Michał Dymek
2023	Killers of the Flower Moon	Rodrigo Prieto
2024	Nickel Boys	Jomo Fray
2025	Sinners	Autumn Durald Arkapaw

== Multiple winners ==
4 wins

- Roger Deakins (1991, 1997, 2010, 2017)

2 wins

- Néstor Almendros (1970, 1978)
- Christopher Doyle (2001, 2005)
- Edward Lachman (2002, 2015)
- Emmanuel Lubezki (2006, 2011)
- Philippe Rousselot (1982, 1987)
- Haskell Wexler (1967, 1976)
- Gordon Willis (1974, 1981)

== See also ==
- Academy Award for Best Cinematography
