= Philippe Rousselot =

French cinematographer and film director

- Born: 4 September 1945 (age 81); Briey, Meurthe-et-Moselle, France
- Years active: 1968–2025
- Organization(s): French Society of Cinematographers; American Society of Cinematographers

Philippe Rousselot, AFC, ASC (French: [filip ʁuslo]; born 4 September 1945) is a French cinematographer, best known for his wide range of work in both European and mainstream American cinema, from drama, to fantasy, and action.

He is the recipient of three César Awards, a BAFTA, an Oscar, and is a nominee for the Palme d'Or.

== Life and career ==
Rousselot was born in Briey, Meurthe-et-Moselle, France.

After studying cinema at l'École Louis Lumière, he graduated in 1966 with, alongside François About, Eduardo Serra, Noël Very, and Jean-François Robin. He then began as an assistant to Néstor Almendros on My Night at Maud’s (1969), Claire's Knee (1970), and Chloe in the Afternoon (1972), all directed by Éric Rohmer. He then quickly emerged as a chief operator.

In 1992, he won the Academy Award for Best Cinematography for his work on A River Runs Through It, and earned three César Awards for Best Cinematography, for Diva, Thérèse, and Queen Margot.

== Filmography ==
=== Film ===
Director

- The Serpent's Kiss (1997)

Cinematographer

| Year | Title | Director | Notes |
|---|---|---|---|
| 1970 | Le clare de terre | Guy Gilles | With Guy Gilles |
| 1971 | Les yeux de maman sont des étoiles | Jacques Robiolles | With Jean-Marie Estève and Claude Reggane |
| 1972 | Repeated Absences | Guy Gilles | |
| 1973 | La raison du plus fou | François Reichenbach | With Daniel Cardot, Christian Odasso and Gerard Taverna |
| 1975 | Il pleut toujours où c'est mouillé | Jean-Daniel Simon | |
| 1976 | L'affiche rouge | Frank Cassenti | |
| 1977 | The Model Couple | William Klein | With William Klein |
| 1977 | Pour Clémence | Charles Belmont | |
| 1977 | Paradiso | Christian Bricout | |
| 1977 | Pauline et l'ordinateur | Francis Fehr | With Pierre Dupouey |
| 1977 | Adom ou Le sang d'Abel | Gérard Myriam Benhamou | |
| 1977 | Peppermint Soda | Diane Kurys | |
| 1979 | The Hussy | Jacques Doillon | |
| 1980 | Cocktail Molotov | Diane Kurys | |
| 1981 | La provinciale | Claude Goretta | |
| 1981 | Diva | Jean-Jacques Beineix | |
| 1981 | La gueule du loup | Michel Léviant | |
| 1982 | Guy De Maupassant | Michel Drach | |
| 1983 | Moon in the Gutter | Jean-Jacques Beineix | |
| 1984 | Thieves After Dark | Samuel Fuller | |
| 1984 | Nemo | Arnaud Sélignac | |
| 1985 | Night Magic | Lewis Furey | |
| 1985 | The Emerald Forest | John Boorman | |
| 1986 | Thérèse | Alain Cavalier | |
| 1987 | Hope and Glory | John Boorman | |
| 1988 | The Bear | Jean-Jacques Annaud | |
| 1988 | Dangerous Liaisons | Stephen Frears | |
| 1989 | Too Beautiful for You | Bertrand Blier | |
| 1989 | We're No Angels | Neil Jordan | |
| 1990 | Henry & June | Philip Kaufman | |
| 1991 | Merci la vie | Bertrand Blier | |
| 1991 | The Miracle | Neil Jordan | |
| 1992 | A River Runs Through It | Robert Redford | |
| 1993 | Sommersby | Jon Amiel | |
| 1993 | Flesh and Bone | Steve Kloves | |
| 1994 | La Reine Margot | Patrice Chéreau | |
| 1994 | Interview with the Vampire | Neil Jordan | |
| 1996 | Mary Reilly | Stephen Frears | |
| 1996 | The People vs. Larry Flynt | Miloš Forman | |
| 1999 | Instinct | Jon Turteltaub | |
| 1999 | Random Hearts | Sydney Pollack | |
| 2000 | Remember the Titans | Boaz Yakin | |
| 2001 | The Tailor of Panama | John Boorman | |
| 2001 | Planet of the Apes | Tim Burton | |
| 2002 | Antwone Fisher | Denzel Washington | |
| 2003 | Big Fish | Tim Burton | |
| 2005 | Constantine | Francis Lawrence | |
| 2005 | Charlie and the Chocolate Factory | Tim Burton | |
| 2007 | The Brave One | Neil Jordan | |
| 2007 | Lions for Lambs | Robert Redford | |
| 2007 | The Great Debaters | Denzel Washington | |
| 2009 | Sherlock Holmes | Guy Ritchie | |
| 2010 | Peacock | Michael Lander | |
| 2011 | Larry Crowne | Tom Hanks | |
| 2011 | A Bird of the Air | Margaret Whitton | |
| 2011 | Sherlock Holmes: A Game of Shadows | Guy Ritchie | |
| 2013 | Beautiful Creatures | Richard LaGravenese | |
| 2016 | The Nice Guys | Shane Black | |
| 2016 | Fantastic Beasts and Where to Find Them | David Yates | |
| 2018 | Fantastic Beasts: The Crimes of Grindelwald | David Yates | |
| 2021 | Without Remorse | Stefano Sollima | |
| 2022 | Beast | Baltasar Kormákur | |
| 2025 | Moi qui t'aimais | Diane Kurys | |
| 2025 | Play Dirty | Shane Black | |

=== Documentary film ===
| Year | Title | Director | Notes |
|---|---|---|---|
| 1974 | Histoires d'A | Charles Belmont; Marielle Issartel | |
| 1985 | Des terroristes à la retraite | Mosco Boucault | With Guy-Auguste Boléat, François Catonné, Guy Chanel, Jean Orjollet, Eduardo Serra and Carlo Varini |

== Awards and nominations ==
| Year | Award | Category | Title | Result |
|---|---|---|---|---|
| 1987 | Academy Awards | Best Cinematography | Hope and Glory | Nominated |
| 1990 | Academy Awards | Best Cinematography | Henry & June | Nominated |
| 1992 | Academy Awards | Best Cinematography | A River Runs Through It | Won |
| 1985 | BAFTA Awards | Best Cinematography | The Emerald Forest | Nominated |
| 1987 | BAFTA Awards | Best Cinematography | Hope and Glory | Nominated |
| 1988 | BAFTA Awards | Best Cinematography | The Bear | Nominated |
| 1988 | BAFTA Awards | Best Cinematography | Dangerous Liaisons | Nominated |
| 1994 | BAFTA Awards | Best Cinematography | Interview with the Vampire | Won |
| 1988 | American Society of Cinematographers | Outstanding Cinematography | Dangerous Liaisons | Nominated |
| 1989 | American Society of Cinematographers | Outstanding Cinematography | Too Beautiful for You | Nominated |
| 1992 | American Society of Cinematographers | Outstanding Cinematography | A River Runs Through It | Nominated |
| 2017 | American Society of Cinematographers | ASC International Award | | Won |
| 1987 | British Society of Cinematographers | Best Cinematography | Hope and Glory | Won |
| 1988 | British Society of Cinematographers | Best Cinematography | Dangerous Liaisons | Nominated |
| 1994 | British Society of Cinematographers | Best Cinematography | Interview with the Vampire | Won |
| 1981 | César Awards | Best Cinematography | Diva | Won |
| 1983 | César Awards | Best Cinematography | Moon in the Gutter | Nominated |
| 1986 | César Awards | Best Cinematography | Thérèse | Won |
| 1988 | César Awards | Best Cinematography | The Bear | Nominated |
| 1989 | César Awards | Best Cinematography | Too Beautiful for You | Nominated |
| 1994 | César Awards | Best Cinematography | La Reine Margot | Won |
| 1997 | Cannes Film Festival | Palme d'Or | The Serpent's Kiss | Nominated |
| 1981 | National Society of Film Critics | Best Cinematography | Diva | Won |
| 1987 | National Society of Film Critics | Best Cinematography | Hope and Glory | Won |
