= Cinéma du look =

Style of French films, common in 1980s–1990s

- Years active: 1980s–1990s
- Location: France
- Influences: New Hollywood, music videos, French New Wave

Cinéma du look (French: [sinema dy luk]) was a French film movement of the 1980s and 1990s, analysed, for the first time, by French critic Raphaël Bassan in La Revue du Cinéma issue no. 449, May 1989, in which he classified Luc Besson, Jean-Jacques Beineix and Leos Carax as directors of the "look".

== Style and origins ==
These directors were said to favor style over substance, spectacle over narrative. It referred to films that had a slick, gorgeous visual style and a focus on young, alienated characters who were said to represent the marginalized youth of François Mitterrand's (1981–1995) France. Themes that run through many of their films include doomed love affairs, young people more affiliated to peer groups than families, a cynical view of the police, and the use of scenes in the Paris Métro to symbolise an alternative, underground society. The mixture of 'high' culture, such as the opera music of Diva and Les Amants du Pont-Neuf, and pop culture, for example the references to Batman in Subway, was another key feature.

A parallel can be drawn between these French filmmakers' productions and New Hollywood films including most notably Francis Ford Coppola's One from the Heart (1981) and Rumble Fish (1983), Rainer Werner Fassbinder's Lola (1981), as well as television commercials, music videos and the television series Miami Vice. The term was first defined by Raphael Bassan in La Revue De Cinema as an insult.

== Key directors and key films ==
=== Jean-Jacques Beineix ===
- Diva (1981)
- The Moon in the Gutter (1983)
- 37°2 le matin (English: Betty Blue) (1986)

=== Luc Besson ===
- Subway (1985)
- Le Grand bleu (English: The Big Blue) (1988)
- Nikita (1990)

=== Leos Carax ===
- Boy Meets Girl (1984)
- Mauvais Sang (1986)
- Les Amants du Pont-Neuf (1991)

== See also ==
- Vulgar auteurism
- MTV
- Neo-noir
- Postmodern film and television
- Auteur theory
