= Daniel Odier =

Swiss author (born 1945)

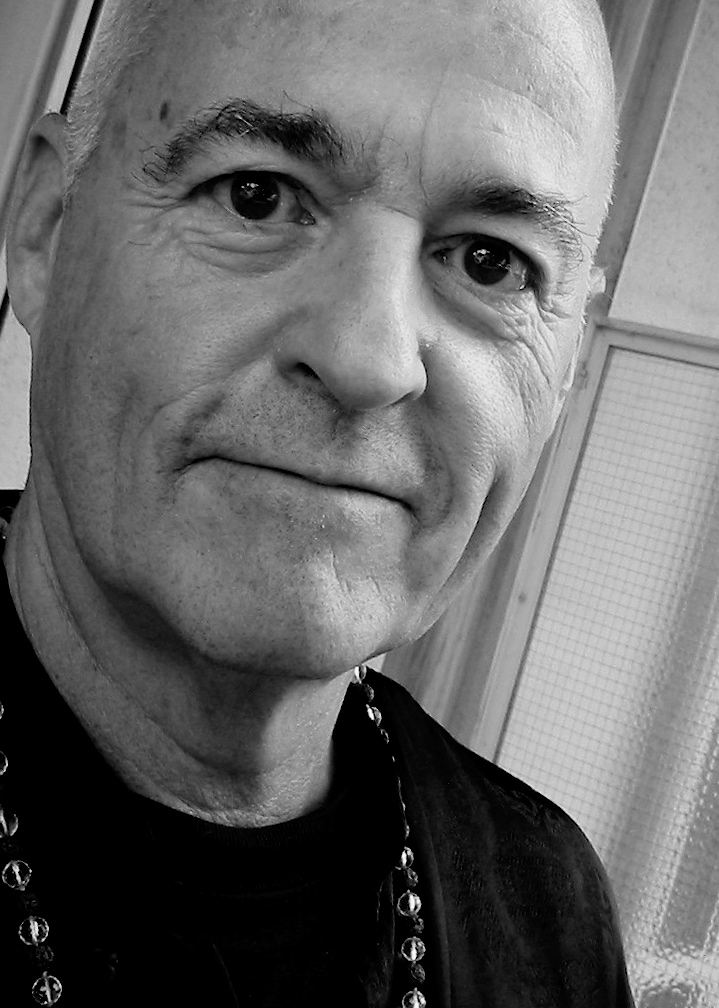
- Born: Daniel Robert Odier; 17 May 1945 (age 80); Geneva, Switzerland
- Other names: Delacorta
- Occupations: Author; screenwriter; poet; essayist
- Notable work: Diva; Luna; The Job: Interviews with William S. Burroughs
- Spouse: Nell Gotkovsky (died 1998)

Daniel Robert Odier (born 1945), also known by the pen name Delacorta, is a Swiss author, teacher, and practitoner of Kashmir Shaivism and Chan Buddhism. He is the author of Tantric Quest (1997), The Doors of Joy (2014), and Yoga Spandakarika (2005).

In English, he is best known for his series of six crime novels featuring Alba, a vivacious adolescent kleptomaniac, and Gorodish, the middle-aged pianist and photographer with a criminal past who adores her. The second in the series, Diva, was adapted to film by Jean-Jacques Beineix in 1981 and became an international success.
