= Wilhelmenia Fernandez =

American operatic soprano (1949–2024)

- Also known as: Wilhelmenia Wiggins Fernandez
- Born: Wilhelmenia Wiggins; January 5, 1949; Philadelphia, Pennsylvania, U.S.
- Died: February 2, 2024 (aged 75) Lexington, Kentucky, U.S.
- Genres: Opera (soprano)
- Occupation: Singer
- Spouse(s): Ormon Fernandez (1971–1976; divorced; 1 child); Andrew William Smith (2001–2018; his death)

Wilhelmenia Fernandez (sometimes billed as Wilhelmenia Wiggins Fernandez; January 5, 1949 – February 2, 2024) was an American soprano. She appeared in Diva, the 1981 film by French director Jean-Jacques Beineix, credited as "Wilhelmenia Wiggins Fernandez".

== Life and career ==
Wilhelmenia Wiggins was born in Philadelphia on January 5, 1949, to Ernest and Vinelee (Clayton) Wiggins. As a child, she sang with the choir of the Main Street Baptist church. In her teens, she sang with the choir of the William Penn High School for Girls and received formal training under soprano Tillie Barmach at the Settlement Music School in Philadelphia.

Fernandez began her academic training at the Philadelphia Academy of Vocal Arts and then studied as a scholarship student at the Juilliard School of Music in New York City. She made her operatic debut as Bess in Porgy and Bess for Houston Grand Opera, a production that toured the U.S. and Europe. She made her Paris début in 1979 as Musetta in La bohème alongside Plácido Domingo and Dame Kiri Te Kanawa.

French film director Jean-Jacques Beineix saw her Musetta performance and cast her as the title character of his 1981 film Diva, which proved an art-house success and became a cult favorite. In the film, Fernandez performed the aria "Ebben? Ne andrò lontana" from Alfredo Catalani's opera La Wally. Its New York run lasted more than two years and it was selected as the official French entry for Best Foreign Language Film at the 54th Academy Awards but was not nominated.

Critic Roger Ebert wrote of her, "The presence of Fernandez is awesome; ...The moments when (the postman) returns her gown, and then the tape, are handled by her with a subtle balance of astonishment and amusement.". New York Times critic Vincent Canby disliked the film, but wrote of Fernandez "(After film's style,) the second best thing in Diva is Miss Fernandez, the Philadelphia-born soprano who is no actress yet, though she has great film presence."

She performed the role of Musetta at the New York City Opera in 1982. She debuted at the Detroit Opera that year and returned to sing Marguerite in Faust the next year.

Thereafter, she sang in operas and recitals in cities all over the world. Her more notable roles were the title roles in Carmen, Carmen Jones and Aïda, which she performed in Luxor and at the Egyptian pyramids. She also made recordings of George Gershwin songs and of Negro spirituals.

For her work in Carmen Jones in the West End, she received the Laurence Olivier Theatre Award in 1992 as Best Actress in a Musical.

Fernandez' 1981 recording of "Ebben? Ne andrò lontana" for Diva was included on the soundtrack of Ridley Scott's 1987 film Someone to Watch Over Me. She also sang as part of a number of television appearances.

Fernandez earned degrees from the University of Kentucky and Georgetown College (in Georgetown, Kentucky) in voice and education.

Fernandez died on February 2, 2024, at the age of 75, of cancer, in Lexington, Kentucky, where she had lived for years.
