= Claude Evrard =

French actor (1933–2020)

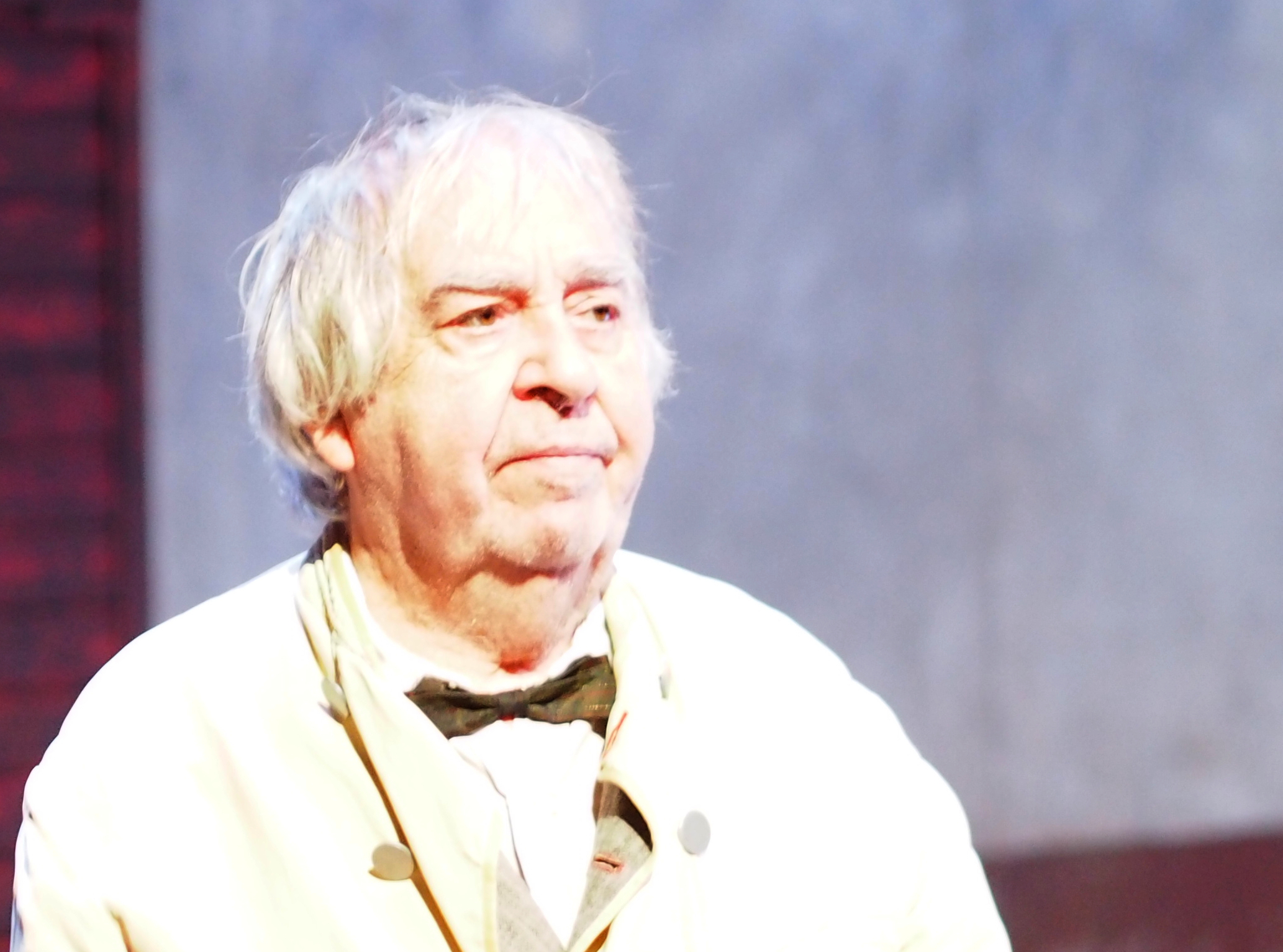
- Evrard in 2013
- Born: Claude Thébaud; 29 July 1933; Versailles, France
- Died: 20 April 2020 (aged 86); Clamart, France
- Occupation: Actor

Claude Evrard (29 July 1933 – 20 April 2020) was a French actor.

== Filmography ==
=== Cinema ===
- La Foire aux cancres (1963)
- Circus Angel (1965) - L'homme volé
- Les ruses du diable (Neuf portraits d'une jeune fille) (1966)
- Voilà l'ordre (1966, Short)
- Un idiot à Paris (1967)
- Le Dimanche de la vie (1967) - Le gendarme
- Le Distrait (1970) - Figuier
- La Coqueluche (1971)
- L'accalmie (1973)
- Chobizenesse (1975) - Chrétien Boussenard
- Maria Chapdelaine (1983) - Caumartin
- Paulette, la pauvre petite milliardaire (1986) - Le commissaire
- Didi Drives Me Crazy (1986) - Leon
- If the Sun Never Returns (1987) - Follonier
- Fucking Fernand (1987) - Mercier
- De guerre lasse (1987) - Un passeur
- La Maison assassinée (1988) - Gaspard Dupin
- La Petite Amie (1988) - Picard
- Cher frangin (1989) - Le père d'Alain
- Toujours seuls (1991) - M. Chevillard
- Blind Date (2015) - Vleux voisin
- Back to Burgundy (2017)

=== Television ===
- La Belle Équipe (1958-1962) - Un employé de bureau / Un valet de chambre / Un mexicain / Eugène Pastel, le violoncelliste
- Cyrano de Bergerac (1960, TV Movie) - Un pâtissier
- Au théâtre ce soir - Le Minotaure (1969) - Gérard Forestier
- Les Nouvelles Aventures de Vidocq (1971) - Le gardien de prison de Melun
- Les enquêtes du commissaire Maigret (1971) - Le lieutenant Daniélou
- Quentin Durward (1971)
- Minichronique (1977) - Fouissard / L'homme à l'imperméable
- Le Boulanger de Suresnes (1981, TV Movie) - Georges - le tabac
- Le Cerisaie (1982, TV Movie) - Epikhodau
- Claire (1986, TV Movie) - Fernand
- L'Affaire Marie Besnard (1986, TV Movie) - Le docteur Beroud
- Les Cinq Dernières Minutes (1994) - Philippe La Vaulx
- Éclats de famille (1994, TV Movie) - Lucien
