= Isabelle Pasco =

French actress and model (born 1966)

- Born: 25 April 1966 (age 60); Perpignan, Pyrénées-Orientales, France
- Occupation: Actress
- Years active: 1984–present

Isabelle Pasco (born 25 April 1966) is a French actress and model.

== Biography ==
Pasco was born in Perpignan. She began her career as a model, modelling for photographers including: Paolo Roversi; Peter Lindberg; David Lachapelle; Helmut Newton; Antony Armstrong-Jones, 1st Earl of Snowdon; and Bettina Rheims.

She began acting in her native south of France, chosen for the role of Sissi in Outside the Law directed by Robin Davis. She then relocated to Paris, cast in Jean-Jacques Beineix production of Roselyne and the Lions, for which she trained for nine months as a lion trainer.

In 2013, she starred in the Parisien stage production of A Clockwork Orange.

She was married to the actor Tchéky Karyo on 21 December 1995, but they were later divorced.

== Films ==
- 2017 - Chacun sa vie et son intime conviction
- 2006 - Intimità
- 2003 - Drôle de genre (TV)
- 2003 - Clandestino
- 2002 - Ali G Indahouse
- 2001 - Una lunga lunga lunga notte d'amore
- 2001 - The Invisible Circus
- 2000 - Dancing at the Blue Iguana
- 1999 - In punta di cuore (1999) (TV)
- 1998 - La course de l'escargot (TV)
- 1997 - Les couleurs du diable
- 1996 - Festival
- 1996 - Sous-sol
- 1996 - Dentro il cuore
- 1995 - Colpo di luna
- 1993 - Les Audacieux (TV)
- 1993 - Charlemagne, le prince à cheval (TV miniseries)
- 1993 - Rhésus Roméo (TV)
- 1993 - La famiglia Ricordi (TV miniseries)
- 1992 - Undine
- 1992 - Céline
- 1992 - À quoi tu penses-tu?
- 1992 - Le droit à l'oubli (TV)
- 1992 - Sabato italiano
- 1992 - Urgence d'aimer (TV)
- 1991 - Prospero's Books
- 1989 - Roselyne and the Lions
- 1988 - Gli indifferenti (TV miniseries)
- 1988 - Qualcuno in ascolto
- 1986 - The Malady of Love
- 1986 - Sauve-toi, Lola
- 1985 - Hors-la-loi
- 1984 - Ave Maria
