= Luna (Odier novel) =

1979 novel by Delacorta

First edition (publ. Seghers)

Luna (1979) by Delacorta is a crime novel set in Paris and in rural France. It concerns the characters Alba, a teenager, and Serge Gorodish, her adult male companion.

== Plot ==
Alba is out running one day when she is kidnapped by a psychiatrist and his patient. They remove Alba to an estate in rural France where she is forced to participate in the patient's entomological fantasies.

When Alba goes missing, her adult companion Serge is distraught. He hatches a plot to save her which involves the theft of multiple Rolls-Royces.

When a painter comes to the estate to paint Alba in a dragonfly costume, Alba befriends him. Alba manages to escape the estate, but she finds herself traumatized, broke, and lost, with criminals trailing her closely. Eventually Alba and Serge are reunited.
