= Dédé (1989 film) =

Dédé is a 1989 French film directed by Jean-Louis Benoît and produced by Septembre Productions. The duration is 80 minutes.

== Synopsis ==
Loosely based on Hamlet, set in Algeria in 1957, Dédé goes to the marriage of his mother with uncle Raymond, brother of his late father, who died two months previously. Shocked by the sudden decision of his mother, Dédé meets childhoods friends Michel and Monique at the ceremony. One night his father appears to him to tell him that he was murdered by Raymond. Dédé vows to avenge his father. To everyone's outrage, Dédé performs a spectacle during a family dinner in which we witness a man murdering his brother in order to wed his widow. Raymond admits his guilt as the murderer to the priest.

== Cast ==
Each member of the cast played an integral part in portraying the social dynamics and individual struggles faced by the characters, enhancing the film’s exploration of love, loyalty, and personal change.

- Luc Thuillier: Dédé
- Didier Bezace: Raymond, the uncle
- Hélène Vincent: Yvonne, the mother
- Yves Afonso: Maurice, the father
- Renée Faure: the grandmother
- Marion Grimault: Monique
- Jacques Mathou: the curate
- Philippe Demarle: Michel
- Michel Berto: Louis
