= My Best Friend (2006 film) =

2006 film by Patrice Leconte

- Theatrical release poster
- Directed by: Patrice Leconte
- Written by: Olivier Dazat; Patrice Leconte; Jerome Tonnerre
- Produced by: Olivier Delbosc; Marc Missonnier
- Starring: Daniel Auteuil; Dany Boon
- Cinematography: Jean-Marie Dreujou
- Music by: Xavier Dermeliac
- Distributed by: Wild Bunch
- Release date: 12 September 2006
- Running time: 94 minutes
- Country: France
- Language: French
- Budget: $12.8 million
- Box office: $14.7 million

My Best Friend (Mon meilleur ami) is a French film starring Daniel Auteuil, Dany Boon, and Julie Gayet.

== Plot ==
François (Auteuil) is a middle-aged, Parisian art dealer who thinks he has everything. After telling a story at dinner about a funeral he attended where only a handful of people turned up, his colleagues suggest that no-one would go to his funeral. He may be materially rich, but he has no friends. Everyone at the dinner table starts to antagonise him about having no friends but François says that he does have friends (in reality, he only has clients). His business partner Catherine (Gayet) challenges him to a bet: François must introduce his best friend within ten days, or lose a valuable object, his antique Greek vase (worth €200,000).

The challenge is accepted. François has ten days to find a friend. As François travels through Paris in a taxi, revisiting old acquaintances who all reject him, he meets a trivia-loving taxi driver, Bruno (Boon). As the two spend an increasing amount of time together, they gradually start to form a friendship. François meets Bruno's parents and buys a worthless table from them for 10,000 euros to be a better friend. However, François's desire to win the bet threatens to destroy the best friendship he has ever had. He tricks Bruno into attempting to steal his vase so François can get his insurance money, but it was all a plot to show how much of a friend Bruno was. Bruno becomes furious and smashes the vase, ending his friendship. To make it up, François gets Bruno on Who Wants to Be a Millionaire by giving away his vase. This is a success, and brings the two together, as friends.

== Cast ==
- Daniel Auteuil : François Coste
- Dany Boon : Bruno Bouley
- Julie Gayet : Catherine
- Elizabeth Bourgine : Julia
- Julie Durand : Louise
- Henri Garcin : Delamotte
- Jacques Spiesser : Letellier
- Audrey Marnay : Marianne
- Jacques Mathou : Bruno's father
- Marie Pillet : Bruno's mother
- Philippe du Janerand : Luc Lebinet
- Fabienne Chaudat : Épouse Lebinet
- Andrée Damant : Train lady
- Anne Le Ny : Casting woman

== Reception ==
On review aggregator website Rotten Tomatoes, the film holds an approval rating of 75% based on 85 reviews, with an average rating of 6.8/10.

== American remake ==
In 2008, producer Brian Grazer hired Wes Anderson to write the script for an English-language remake of My Best Friend; Anderson completed a draft for the script, with the film tentatively called The Rosenthaler Suite, in 2009.
