= Thérèse (film) =

1986 French biographical drama film by Alain Cavalier

- Directed by: Alain Cavalier
- Written by: Camille de Casabianca; Alain Cavalier
- Produced by: Maurice Bernart
- Starring: Catherine Mouchet
- Cinematography: Philippe Rousselot
- Edited by: Isabelle Dedieu
- Production companies: AFC; CNC; Films A2
- Distributed by: UGC Distribution
- Release dates: 16 May 1986 (Cannes); 7 September 1986 (Toronto); 26 September 1986
- Running time: 94 minutes
- Country: France
- Language: French

Thérèse is a 1986 French biographical drama film directed by Alain Cavalier, about the life of Saint Thérèse of Lisieux, as played by Catherine Mouchet.

== Synopsis ==
Like two of her older sisters before her, Thérèse Martin is determined to become a Carmelite nun, even though she is officially too young to enter the order. Thérèse's stubborn piety wins through, and her love affair with Jesus transfigures her short life. Alain Cavalier's account of Thérèse's joy in her vocation is based on her spiritual autobiography, The Story of a Soul.

== Critical responses ==
The film was first shown on British television on 12 November 1988 for BBC Two's nun-themed film evening and was introduced by English novelist Marina Warner:

I think Thérèse is a rare and beautiful film ... No film has ever before transmitted so involvingly the bliss the mystics describe of communion with God, the intense pleasure a saint like Thérèse felt at her intimacy with Jesus, the deprivation she experienced when He seemed to be absent, and the comfort and affection of young women sequestered together ... Cavalier's visual style, the film's restrained spectrum, its dove greys, bistres, waxy whites, recall the quiet images Gwen John painted in Normandy of nuns reading, praying ... Cavalier scans the properties of convent life... He has learned from Robert Bresson how to linger on an image, how to give symbolic intensity to humdrum objects, by isolating them in the frame, and gentle repetition.

In The New Yorker the critic Pauline Kael wrote that:

Watching Thérèse is like looking at a book of photographs of respectfully staged tableaux, and not being allowed to flip the pages at your own speed. You have to sit there, while Cavalier turns them for you, evenly, monotonously, allowing their full morbid beauty to sink in. You're trapped inside his glass bubble.

The academic Mary Bryant called the film, "by far the most effective and challenging rendering of the Thérèse-event in the decade leading up to Thérèse's centenary year in 1997" ... Alain Cavalier was careful at pre-production stage to immerse himself not only in data, but also in visual and atmospheric detail. His film is a beautifully lit evocation of the stylised poverty of Carmel, which is like that which we now associate with Shaker furniture and interiors. Although Cavalier did visit the Lisieux Carmel, and spoke to the sisters there, the film was not shot on location there, and makes no attempt to reproduce the recognisable architecture of that monastery. Instead, it focuses upon faces in spaces, intensity within enclosure, as in the late plays of Samuel Beckett. There are no exterior shots at all in the film; instead, the presence of an extra-monastic world is conveyed obliquely, by the background cooing of a wood pigeon, or by the green, pulsating body of a tiny crouching frog, cupped in the hand of an infirmarian, and brought in to give pleasure to the dying Thérèse".

"The actress Catherine Mouchet, who plays Thérèse (and who bears a startling physical similarity to her), incarnates the simplicity of Thérèse without ever spilling over into the ethereal or the fey. In one scene, she and another sister stand side by side ... the other sister reveals, while they work, the internal split she experiences within religious life: mon corps est ici, mais mon esprit est ailleurs ("My body is here, but my spirit is elsewhere"). For Thérèse, the opposite is true: She is always intensely present in every scene, never dreaming or oblivious".

On review aggregator website Rotten Tomatoes, the film holds an approval rating of 89% based on 9 reviews, with an average rating of 7.7/10.

== Cast ==
- Catherine Mouchet as Thérèse Martin
- Aurore Prieto as Céline Martin
- Sylvie Habault as Pauline Martin
- Ghislaine Mona as Marie Martin
- Hélène Alexandridis as Lucie
- Clémence Massart as Prioress
- Nathalie Bernart as Aimée
- Jean Pelegri as Monsieur Martin
- Armand Meppiel as Pope Leo XIII
- Pierre Maintigneux as Convent doctor
- Joël Lefrançois as Young doctor
- Beatrice de Vigan as Singer
- Michel Rivelin as Pranzini

== Awards and recognition ==
At the 12th César Awards, it won Best Film, Best Original Screenplay or Adaptation, Best Cinematography (Philippe Rousselot), and Best Editing (Isabelle Dedieu). The film also won the Jury Prize at the 1986 Cannes Film Festival. Catherine Mouchet won the César Award for Most Promising Actress for her performance.

It was also selected by the Vatican in the "Religion" category of its list of 45 "great films".
