= IP5: L'île aux pachydermes =

1992 film

- Directed by: Jean-Jacques Beineix
- Written by: Jacques Forgeas
- Produced by: Jean-Jacques Beineix; Jérôme Chalou
- Starring: Yves Montand; Olivier Martinez; Sekkou Sall; Géraldine Pailhas
- Cinematography: Jean-François Robin
- Edited by: Joëlle Hache
- Music by: Gabriel Yared
- Production companies: Cargo Films; Gaumont Production
- Distributed by: Gaumont Distribution
- Release date: 12 June 1992 (France)
- Running time: 119 minutes
- Country: France
- Language: French

IP5: L'île aux pachydermes is a 1992 film directed by Jean-Jacques Beineix.

The film was the last of Yves Montand.

== Title ==
The title of the film comes from "IP" which means "L'Ile aux Pachydermes" which is a locality in the film, and "5" because it is the fifth film by director Jean-Jacques Beineix.

== Cast ==
- Yves Montand as Léon Marcel
- Olivier Martinez as Tony
- Sekkou Sall as « Jojo » (Jockey)
- Géraldine Pailhas as Gloria, l'infirmière
- Colette Renard as Clarisse et Monique
- Sotigui Kouyaté as Émile, le père de Jojo
- Samir Guesmi as Saddam, un jeune de l'immeuble
- Georges Staquet as Jean-Marie
- Arlette Didier as Arlouse
- Jenny Clève as la sœur de Léon
- Alain Frérot as le frère de Léon
- Olivier Barret as Kronk
- Fabien Béhar as client au restaurant
- Sylvaine Bouley as serveuse
- Kléber Bouzonne as Lulu
- Rémy Carpentier as militaire en voiture
- Laurent Duquesnoy as La Force
- Serge Feuillard as gendarme
- Jacques Giraud as gendarme
- Jane Hugon as concierge
- Bernard Lepinaux as Canon Ball
- Gabriel Monnet as boucher
- Carole Richert as Sophia
- Paul Vally as père de Léon

== Production ==
Filming took place in the Orne department, including in Cerisé, Le Ménil-Broût and Mortagne-au-Perche. Filming also took in the Forêt d'Écouves at the bridge spanning the Briante waterway, near the Rocher du Vignage. Traffic was shut down on the D26 for several hours. Filming also took place in the Forêt d'Halatte, located in the Oise department.
