= National Board of Review Awards 1986 =

Annual US film awards ceremony

58th National Board of Review Awards

Best Picture:
A Room with a View

The 58th National Board of Review Awards were announced on December 11, 1986, and given on February 9, 1987.

== Top 10 films ==
1. A Room with a View
2. Hannah and Her Sisters
3. My Beautiful Laundrette
4. The Fly
5. Stand By Me
6. The Color of Money
7. Children of a Lesser God
8. 'Round Midnight
9. Peggy Sue Got Married
10. The Mission

== Top Foreign films ==
1. Otello
2. Miss Mary
3. Ginger and Fred
4. Menage
5. Men...

== Winners ==
- Best Picture:
  - A Room with a View
- Best Foreign Language Film:
  - Othello, Italy/Netherlands
- Best Actor:
  - Paul Newman - The Color of Money
- Best Actress:
  - Kathleen Turner - Peggy Sue Got Married
- Best Supporting Actor:
  - Daniel Day-Lewis - A Room with a View and My Beautiful Laundrette
- Best Supporting Actress:
  - Dianne Wiest - Hannah and Her Sisters
- Best Director:
  - Woody Allen - Hannah and Her Sisters
- Career Achievement Award:
  - Jack Lemmon
