= Evening Dress (film) =

1986 film by Bertrand Blier

- Film poster
- French: Tenue de soirée
- Directed by: Bertrand Blier
- Written by: Bertrand Blier
- Produced by: René Cleitman
- Starring: Gérard Depardieu; Michel Blanc; Miou-Miou
- Cinematography: Jean Penzer
- Edited by: Claudine Merlin
- Music by: Serge Gainsbourg
- Distributed by: Acteurs Auteurs Associés
- Release date: 23 April 1986
- Running time: 84 minutes
- Country: France
- Language: French
- Box office: $23.6 million

Evening Dress (French: Tenue de soirée, also known as Ménage) is a 1986 French comedy-drama film directed by Bertrand Blier. It was entered into the 1986 Cannes Film Festival where Michel Blanc won the award for Best Actor.

== Background ==
The idea for Tenue de soirée came to Blier around the time of Les Valseuses, and his intention then was to cast Depardieu with his co-star from the earlier film, Patrick Dewaere. In the 1980s Blier created the screenplay and shared it with Depardieu, with the other male lead now intended for Bernard Giraudeau, but he was in turn replaced by Michel Blanc. After Les Valseuses and Préparez vos mouchoirs the Depardieu-Blanc couple in this film allows Blier to examine further aspects of male relationships, mainly in terms of dominant/dominated. Although Blier had wanted to repeat the central trio of Valseuses (Depardieu, Dewaere, Miou-Miou), the suicide of Dewaere in 1982 had put paid to his plans. The film marked a turning point in the screen career for Blanc. In 1985 he was approached by Blier with the offer of a role in his next project, but after Giraudeau withdrew gave him one of the leads. The film also meant that Blanc lost his familiar moustache by the end of the film.

A British reviewer noted "this is a film about love, and the less likely the object, the stronger the film". He commended the "superb" dialogue and the choice of actors. The cast and crew, while thrilled with the humour of the rushes they saw, were fearful of the public reaction, particularly to the homosexual element. However, an enthusiastic article in Gai pied, entitled "Touche pas à la femme Blanc" sealed the realisation that no mockery was intended.

Blier positioned the film within a category of his output which he called "La direction de base, c’est celle de la truculence, du récit picaresque" ("The basic direction is that of a larger-than-life, picaresque narrative"). He noted that the characters were marked by aggression "ils s’engueulent, sont mécontents, presque toujours du mauvais côté de la rue" ("they argue, are unhappy, almost always on the wrong side of the track").

An original soundtrack album from the film featuring the music of Gainsbourg was issued on LP and cassette by Apache records in 1986.

== Plot ==
In a dance hall, an ebullient ex-convict named Bob befriends an impecunious young couple in the middle of a row, the shrewish Monique and the passive Antoine. He showers them with money and takes them on several burgling escapades in salubrious houses. In one, while he and Antoine ransack the place for money, Monique, delighted with new-found luxury, has a bath and helps herself to clothes and scents. Antoine is nervous about it all and especially the advances of Bob. They manage to evade capture even when the homeowners are present or return while the three are around. But it becomes apparent that it is Antoine to whom Bob is attracted, while Monique is an also ran. She, hoping to stay in the new-found comfort, nonetheless nudges Antoine towards Bob. The relationship between the two men develops in unexpected directions.

== Cast ==
- Michel Blanc as Antoine
- Gérard Depardieu as Bob
- Miou-Miou as Monique
- Michel Creton as Pedro
- Jean-Pierre Marielle as the wealthy and depressive man
- Caroline Silhol as the depressive woman
- Jean-Yves Berteloot as the male prostitute
- Bruno Cremer as the art lover
- Mylène Demongeot as the woman of the couple in bed
- Jean-François Stevenin as the man of the couple in bed
- Dominique Besnehard as Bob's friend
- Bernard Farcy as Bob's friend
- Michel Pilorgé as car driver

== Reception ==
Tenue de soirée achieved ticket sales of 3,144,799 in French cinemas, of which 823,433 were in Paris where it stayed as most popular attraction at the box office for two weeks. The film was one of the greatest successes of Bertrand Blier after Les Valseuses of 1974 (which made 5,726,031 tickets sold).

On review aggregator website Rotten Tomatoes, the film holds an approval rating of 83% based on 6 reviews, with an average rating of 6.2/10.

== Accolades ==
| Award / Film Festival | Category | Recipients and nominees | Result |
|---|---|---|---|
| Cannes Film Festival | Palme d'Or | | Nominated |
| Cannes Film Festival | Best Actor | Michel Blanc | Won |
| César Awards | Best Film | | Nominated |
| César Awards | Best Director | Bertrand Blier | Nominated |
| César Awards | Best Actress | Miou-Miou | Nominated |
| César Awards | Best Actor | Michel Blanc | Nominated |
| César Awards | Best Original Screenplay or Adaptation | Bertrand Blier | Nominated |
| César Awards | Best Editing | Claudine Merlin | Nominated |
| César Awards | Best Original Music | Serge Gainsbourg | Nominated |
| César Awards | Best Sound | Bernard Bats and Dominique Hennequin | Nominated |
| National Board of Review Awards | Top Foreign Films | | Nominated |
