= Qui veut gagner des millions? =

French TV game show

- Genre: Quiz show
- Created by: David Briggs; Mike Whitehill; Steven Knight
- Presented by: Jean-Pierre Foucault (2000–2016, 2019); Camille Combal (2019–2020); Arthur (2024–2026)
- Theme music composer: Keith Strachan; Matthew Strachan (remixed in 2010 by Ramon Covalo and Nick Magnus)
- Country of origin: France

Production
- Running time: 52 minutes
- Production companies: Starling (2004–2020); 2waytraffic (2008–2016); Satisfaction Group (2024–2026)

Original release
- Network: TF1
- Release: 3 July 2000 – 1 January 2016
- Release: 19 January 2019 – 1 August 2020
- Release: 20 September 2024 – 3 February 2026

Qui veut gagner des millions? (Who Wants to Win Millions?) is the French version of Who Wants to Be a Millionaire?. The aim of the game is to win the top prize of €1,000,000 (3 for some shows then 4 million FF before France adopted the euro) by answering 15 (12 from 2009 to 2016) multiple-choice questions correctly. It is broadcast on the TF1 network, and was hosted by Jean-Pierre Foucault from 2000 until 2019, then by Camille Combal and in 2024 by Arthur.

For more about the show and rules see Who Wants to Be a Millionaire?; the money tree differs in amounts, but the format is virtually identical. For several years a "Switch the Question" lifeline was available once a contestant answered the fifth question correctly. As of April 2009, the first three possible questions were taken out of the game, reducing the number of possible questions to 12, similar to the UK format in play from September 2007 to February 2014. For list of international variants of the show, see International versions of Who Wants to Be a Millionaire?.

The show served as a plot device in the French film My Best Friend.

In December 2010, TF1 announced the end of the first daily multi-year run, due to a fall in viewing of that series as of June.

A prime-time version with celebrities (for charity) was maintained between 2010 and final broadcast of that main series on January 1, 2016.

In December 2018 in a charity version, Jean-Pierre Foucault announced he would leave the show in favour of Camille Combal for a return to the air on TF1 in January 2019 – each figured respectively as a contestant on those shows also.

In February 2019, TF1 announced the return of the daily version. The first tapings were scheduled for April 2019, for a broadcast from May 13, 2019, at 6:15 pm.

On May 23, 2024, Arthur announced on his Instagram account for the return of the show with himself as the presenter to celebrate the 25th anniversary of the program.

== Game rules ==
=== Main game ===
The goal of the game is to answer, without a single fault, a progression of questions of general knowledge/culture, ideally to try to win the maximum prize, set since September 2001 at €1,000,000. Such maximal wins have mirrored its increase in value.

== Money trees ==
Question number	Question value (Yellow zones are the guaranteed levels)					
Question number	early 2000	late 2000–01	2001–09	2009–16	2019 2024–	À la maison (2020)
1	1,000F (€152.44)		€200	€800	€100	
2	2,000F (€304.89)		€300	€1,500	€200	
3	3,000F (€457.34)		€500	€3,000	€300	
4	5,000F (€762.24)		€800	€6,000	€500	
5	10,000F (€1,524.49)		€1,500	€12,000	€1,000	
6	20,000F (€3,048.98)		€3,000	€24,000	€2,000	
7	40,000F (€6,097.96)		€6,000	€48,000	€4,000	
8	80,000F (€12,195.92)		€12,000	€72,000	€8,000	€6,000
9	150,000F (€22,867.35)		€24,000	€100,000	€12,000	€8,000
10	300,000F (€45,734.70)		€48,000	€150,000	€24,000	€12,000
11	500,000F (€76,224.50)		€72,000	€300,000	€36,000	€18,000
12	700,000F (€106,714.31)		€100,000	€1,000,000	€72,000	€30,000
13	1,000,000F (€152,449.01)		€150,000	N/A	€150,000	€50,000
14	1,500,000F (€228,673.52)	2,000,000F (€304,898.03)	€300,000	N/A	€300,000	€100,000
15	3,000,000F (€457,347.05)	4,000,000F (€609,796.06)	€1,000,000	N/A	€1,000,000	€300,000

== Lifelines ==
- Fifty-Fifty (Le cinquante-cinquante): The contestant asks the host to have the computer randomly eliminate two of the incorrect answer choices, leaving a choice of a correct and an incorrect answer.
- Phone-A-Friend (L'appel à un ami): The contestant may call a prearranged friend. The contestant must provide the friends' names and phone numbers in advance. The contestant has thirty seconds to read the question and four choices to the friend, who must select an answer before the time runs out. Phone-a-friends often express their certainty as a percentage (I am 80% sure it's C).
- Ask the Audience (L'avis du public) (2000–2016, 2019, 2024): The contestant asks the studio audience which answer they believe is correct. Members of the studio audience indicate their choices using an audience response system. The results are immediately displayed on the contestant's and host's screens. This is a popular lifeline, known for its high accuracy.
- Switch the Question (Le switch) (2006–2009): This was available after the contestant correctly answered the €1,500 question. Before choosing a final answer this lifeline entitled the contestant to switch the original question for another of the same value. Once used, return to the original question was forbidden, whose correct answer was revealed (for entirely academic purposes). Any lifelines used by the contestant attempting to answer the original question were not reinstated.
- Ask the Host (Le feeling de Camille) (2019–2020): Used in the 20th anniversary of the British original, the French revival, and the Italian revival. When used by the contestant, the host uses their knowledge of a question's subject, gives their thoughts about the question, and tries to assist them with finding the correct answer out of the choices given. The lifeline features no time limit, and the host reassures all they have no connection to the outside world and receive the question and possible answers for it at the same time as the contestant, and thus have no knowledge of what the correct answer is.
- Phone at Home (L'appel à la maison) (2020): This lifeline works exactly like the "Phone-A-Friend", except that instead of an acquaintance of the contestant's choice, an anonymous person who registered beforehand is randomly selected and called to try to help the contestant answer the question.
- Ask One of the Audience (Le Vox Populi) (2024–): The host asks the question and asks people in the audience to stand up if they know the correct answer. Contestants choose one single person to try to answer the question correctly, explaining their choice. This lifeline replaces "Ask the Audience" during the current game.

== Broadcast ==
- From July 3, 2000 to July 21, 2000 Monday to Friday at 7 pm.
- From September 30, 2000 to December 2, 2000, and from March 17, 2001 to July 7, 2001, every Saturday at 6:55 pm and 8:50 pm.
- From September 15, 2001 to December 1, 2001, every Saturday at 6:55 pm and 8:50 pm.
- From July 1, 2002 to August 23, 2002 Monday to Friday at 6:55 pm.
- From December 23, 2002 to January 3, 2003 Monday to Friday at 6:55 pm.
- From July 7, 2003 to August 29, 2003 Monday to Friday at 7 pm.
- From December 22, 2003 to January 9, 2004 Monday to Friday at 6:55 pm.
- From July 12, 2004 to September 3, 2004 Monday to Friday at 6:50 pm.
- From December 23, 2004 to December 31, 2004 Monday to Friday at 6:55 pm.
- From June 30, 2005 to September 2, 2005 Monday to Friday at 6:55 pm.
- From December 17, 2005 to January 1, 2006, every Saturday and Sunday at 6:55 pm.
- From June 5, 2006 to August 4, 2006 Monday to Friday at 6:55 pm.
- From December 25, 2006 to January 5, 2007 Monday to Friday at 6:55 pm.
- From May 21, 2007 to July 27, 2007 Monday to Friday at 6:55 pm.
- From December 24, 2007 to January 4, 2008 Monday to Friday at 7:05 pm.
- From April 14, 2008 to June 27, 2008 Monday to Friday at 6:55 pm.
- From April 27, 2009 to June 19, 2009 Monday to Friday at 6:55 pm.
- From December 21, 2009 to January 1, 2010 Monday to Friday at 6:55 pm.
- From June 7, 2010 to July 9, 2010 Monday to Friday at 6:20 pm.
- From May 13, 2019 to June 21, 2019 Monday to Friday at 6:15 pm.
- From April 20, 2020 to June 12, 2020 Monday to Friday at 6 pm.

== Characteristics ==
=== The music ===
The music commonly associated with the franchise was composed by Keith and Matthew Strachan, father and son. It dramatizes the atmosphere and brings tension, and unlike old games, the music was created to be played throughout most of the show. The credits acknowledge inspiration from public domain Mars in Gustav Holst's Planets Suite; each musical theme used for the questions (from €3,000 to €48,000, then from €72,000 to €300,000 until 2016, from €2,000 to €24,000, and from €36,000 to €300,000 since 2019). The music goes up a semitone per question, as candidates progress through the risk and reward scale.

In 2010 - 2020, the credits are remixing and new music (used in the original British version between 2007 and 2014) by Ramon Covalo and Nick Magnus

== Special shows ==
Special shows, where anonymous candidates played, were aired in prime time (Couples, Stepmom and Stepson, Twins, Bachelors and Newlyweds) between June 7, 2001 and November 29, 2005.

Prime Time, where celebrities aimed to win for their chosen charity, was broadcast between September 29, 2001 and January 1, 2016 and now January 19, 2019.

Only the prime-time version with celebrities aired between 2010 and the first day of 2016, the daily version having stopped.

On July 1, 2003, a special program entitled "L'émission interdite" was broadcast in the second half of the evening. It was entirely devoted to the case Charles Ingram, contestant of the British version of the game who had pocketed £ 1 million by cheating with the help of two accomplices present in the public and on the set. This report was the only time Jean-Pierre Foucault presented without the public.

On September 5, 2015, TF1 broadcast a special anniversary edition (for the 15 years of the show). This saw TV game hosts from TF1 with their biggest winner (including Laurence Boccolini for Money Drop and Jean-Luc Reichmann for Les 12 coups de midi), as well as Christophe Beaugrand and Olivier Minne, as respective hosts of QI: la France passe le test and Joker; Foucault also played alongside a former grand prize winner.

On January 1, 2016, TF1 broadcast a Pièces Jaunes special edition.

On January 19, 2019, the return of the game after three years of absence, saw Jean-Pierre Foucault present the game for his last time hosting five pairs of celebrities playing for charities, emulating the latest series. At the end of the show, Camille Combal was a candidate (with Anne-Élisabeth Lemoine); Combal took over the reins of the show permanently (and next charity broadcast) on January 26; Foucault co-contested.

On April 18, 2019, after the fire at Notre-Dame de Paris, TF1 announced that the Section de recherches series had been replaced by a special edition for that cathedral. This saw three pairs of presenters and a duo from Dance avec les stars : Anne-Claire Coudray and Harry Roselmack, Laurence Boccolini and Arthur, Alessandra Sublet and Grégoire Margotton and Fauve Hautot and Chris Marques.

The return of the daily version on May 13, 2019 brought a novelty: during some programs, two contestants participate in the duet game and two celebrities participate in the duet game for an association, which was previously the case only in the programs in the first part of the evening.

On April 20, 2020, a format called "à la maison" (at home) started broadcasting during the COVID-19 pandemic in France for celebrity contestants to answer questions from their homes using video conference. All prizes generated in this special program are given to charity.

The 25th anniversary special edition of the program saw two episodes airing in September 2024. A TF1 50th anniversary special episode aired on February 4, 2025. A special edition with prizes donated for multi-associations aired on May 24, 2025. A second one aired on January 13, 2026. A third one aired on February 3, 2026.

== Grand prize winners ==
- Frédéric Grégoire won 4 million francs on September 30, 2000.
- Louis Bienheureux won 4 million francs on November 4, 2000.
- Marie Friedel won €1 million on August 27, 2004.
