= The Malady of Love =

- Directed by: Giorgio Treves
- Written by: Vincenzo Cerami; Giorgio Treves; Pierre Dumayet
- Starring: Robin Renucci; Isabelle Pasco; Piera Degli Esposti
- Cinematography: Giuseppe Ruzzolini
- Music by: Egisto Macchi
- Release date: 1986
- Countries: Italy; France

The Malady of Love (Italian: La coda del diavolo, French: Le Mal d'aimer) is a 1986 Italian-French romantic drama film directed by Giorgio Treves. For this film Treves won the David di Donatello for Best New Director.

== Cast ==
- Robin Renucci : Robert Briand
- Isabelle Pasco : Marte-Blanche
- Piera Degli Esposti : Thérèse
- Erland Josephson : Robert's Father
- Carole Bouquet : Eleonore
- Paolo Rossi : Laurent
- Franco Citti : Cigal
- Andrzej Seweryn : The Pedlar
- Gianfranco Barra
