= The Moon in the Gutter =

- French film poster
- Directed by: Jean-Jacques Beineix
- Written by: Jean-Jacques Beineix; Olivier Mergault; David Goodis (novel)
- Produced by: Lise Fayolle; Hubert Niogret; Emmanuel Schlumberger
- Starring: Gérard Depardieu; Nastassja Kinski
- Cinematography: Philippe Rousselot
- Edited by: Yves Deschamps; Monique Prim
- Music by: Gabriel Yared
- Distributed by: Gaumont Distribution
- Release date: 18 May 1983
- Running time: 137 minutes
- Country: France
- Language: French
- Box office: $4.7 million

The Moon in the Gutter (French: La Lune dans le caniveau) is a 1983 French drama film directed by Jean-Jacques Beineix. It was entered into the 1983 Cannes Film Festival.

Although it immediately followed Beineix's big, commercial success Diva and featured two major stars, Gérard Depardieu and Nastassja Kinski, The Moon in the Gutter was not well received by critics or audiences and failed at the box office with only 625,000 admissions in France. Its vivid visual style was noted by critics. Beineix re-established his box office appeal with his next film, Betty Blue.

The film was based on a 1953 American pulp-noir novel by David Goodis, though the story was transferred from the docksides of Philadelphia to Marseille.

La Lune dans le caniveau, according to AllMovie, "received uneven reviews on its initial release". It won a French Cesar Award for its production design.

== Plot ==
Two women: Loretta (Nastassja Kinski), a wealthy amateur photographer who prowls the docks in her '60s Ferrari 250 GT California Spyder looking for handsome men, and Bella (Victoria Abril), a poor but beautiful woman who is probably a prostitute, share affections for a dock worker named Gerard (played by Gérard Depardieu). He is obsessed by the memory of his sister, who was raped and then committed suicide in a back alley, which he visits every night. No one knows who committed the rape, and he has sworn to avenge the crime, if he can only figure out who the perpetrator was.

== Cast ==
- Gérard Depardieu : Gérard Delmas
- Nastassja Kinski : Loretta Channing
- Victoria Abril : Bella
- Bertice Reading : Lola
- Gabriel Monnet : Tom
- Dominique Pinon : Frank
- Milena Vukotic : Frieda
- Vittorio Mezzogiorno : Newton Channing
- Bernard Farcy : Jésus
- Anne-Marie Coffinet : Dora
- Katya Berger - Catherine
- Jacques Herlin
- Guido Alberti

== Release ==
The film was screened at the 1983 Cannes Film Festival and the 1983 Toronto International Film Festival.

== Reception ==
On the review aggregator website Rotten Tomatoes, 20% of 5 critics' reviews are positive, with an average rating of 5.4/10.

Although the movie was a failure when first released, it had a number of cult admirers. In the mid-1980s it was often screened as a fashionable late night art movie for esoteric clubs such as the Edinburgh Academy Cinema Society.

In the American DVD release director Jean-Jacques Beineix reveals that after the expanded 3 hour DVD version director's cut of Betty Blue was released he approached Gaumont, the studio that produced the film, about doing the same with The Moon in the Gutter. A studio executive later notified him sadly that such an extended release recut was not possible in this case. It was revealed that Gaumont had felt the film was so poorly received initially that all of the extra footage and doubles were destroyed to make space in the film vaults.

The excuse was that accountants had reasoned that the film was a financial liability with little future value that had severely damaged Gaumont's reputation. Such an action is said to be extremely rare in the film industry since the cost of storing film footage is rather minimal after production has ended. Beineix added that the film had originally been cut into a 4 hour version and a 3 hour version as well and that both lost versions expanded on the main characters and more fully exposed and explained the story's main premise.The loss reportedly haunted Beineix to his death.
