= A City Is Beautiful at Night =

- French: C'est beau une ville la nuit
- Directed by: Richard Bohringer
- Written by: Richard Bohringer; Gábor Rassov
- Produced by: Richard Bohringer; Claude Léger; Marco Pacchioni; Denis Charvet; Jean-Marc Félio; Laila Tahhar
- Starring: Richard Bohringer; Romane Bohringer; Robinson Stévenin
- Cinematography: Dominique Brenguier
- Edited by: Yves Langlois
- Music by: Richard Bohringer; Olivier Monteils; Bertrand Richard
- Production companies: Les Films Christy's; Milagro Films; France 2 Cinéma
- Distributed by: Limelight Distribution
- Release date: 8 November 2006
- Running time: 90 minutes
- Country: France
- Language: French

A City Is Beautiful at Night (French: C'est beau une ville la nuit) is a 2006 French drama film directed by Richard Bohringer.

== Plot ==
The film is based on the eponymous book by Richard Bohringer, an autobiography mixing reality and imagination, Africa and travel, drugs and alcohol, actor and musician, family and love, Richard is revealed..

== Cast ==
- Richard Bohringer as Richard
- Romane Bohringer as Romane
- Robinson Stévenin as Paulo
- Luc Thuillier as Rolland
- Gabrielle Lazure as Régine
- Christian Morin as Régine's Husband
- Bertrand Richard as Bertrand
- Olivier Monteils as Olivier
- Pierre Marie as Pierre
- Arnaud Frankfurt as Arnaud
- Kader Ayd as Gambler
- Annie Cordy as The HLM Grandma
- Annie Girardot as The Grandmother
- Sonia Rolland as The Transsexual Dancer
- Jacques Spiesser as The Manager
- Farid Chopel as The Blind Berber
- Daniel Duval as The Cop
- Paul Personne as himself
