= Gabriel Yared =

Lebanese composer and conductor (born 1949)

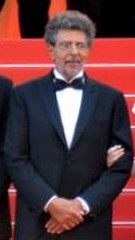
- Yared at the 2017 Cannes Film Festival

Background information
- Born: 7 October 1949 (age 76); Beirut, Lebanon
- Occupation: Composer

Gabriel Yared (Arabic: غبريال يارد; born 7 October 1949) is a Lebanese-French composer, best known for his work in French and American cinema. He also served as the composer of the 1999 Warner Bros. Pictures fanfare, which originally debuted a year earlier during a montage to celebrate the studio's 75th anniversary.

Born in Beirut, Lebanon, Yared scored the French films Betty Blue and Camille Claudel. He later worked on English-language films, particularly those directed by Anthony Minghella. He won an Academy Award for Best Original Score and a Grammy Award for his work on The English Patient (1996) and was nominated for both The Talented Mr. Ripley (1999) and Cold Mountain (2003).

== Life and career ==
When Yared was 7, his father sent him to an accordion teacher. Two years later Yared stopped his accordion lessons and started music theory and piano lessons. Although he was not necessarily a gifted pianist, Yared was interested in reading music. When Yared was 14, his piano teacher died and Yared replaced him as the organist of Université Saint-Joseph. Yared used the university's library to read the works of Johann Sebastian Bach, Robert Schumann, and many other composers. This extensive reading inspired his first original composition, a piano waltz.

Yared gained a degree in law and did not formally study music at the university level until he traveled to France in 1969 to attend the École Normale de Musique de Paris as a non-registered student. There he learned music composition from Henri Dutilleux.

At the end of 1971, Yared went to Brazil to visit his uncle and was asked by the president of the World Federation of Light Music Festivals to write a song to represent the Lebanese in the Rio de Janeiro Song Festival. The song he composed went on to win first prize. While in Brazil, he also performed with a small orchestra. Yared subsequently said that his time in Brazil greatly influenced his work.

In 1975, he arranged the album Minacantalucio for the most popular Italian singer of all time, Mina.

He then went back to France, where he met and collaborated with the Costa Brothers, Jacques Dutronc, Françoise Hardy, Charles Aznavour, Mireille Mathieu, and numerous other musicians. This was a prolific period for the composer and he wrote nearly 3,000 pieces over a span of about six years. His contributions included a number of radio and TV jingles, such as TF1 news jingles and an episode on the series In the Tracks of.

Among the collaborations with Françoise Hardy, Yared produced and arranged her 1977 album Star, composing two songs of the album, Chanson sur toi et nous and Fatiguée.

Yared composed and produced Yara Lapidus' 2018 album Indéfiniment, and the final track Encor Encor (bonus track version featuring Iggy Pop) is a song based on Betty Blue soundtrack, C'est le vent, Betty.

Albums as a singer: Quand Le Monde (1972) - Quand Le Monde and Ouabadabada, Oui! || Toc Toc Toqué (1979) - Gabriel Yared: Composer, Arranger, Singer, Producer. Michel Jonasz: Lyricist. - Papa Schumann - video: INA, Institut national de l'audiovisuel - "Numéro un" Season 6 - Episode 5 (16 February 1980) Gabriel Yared "Papa Schumann" - YouTube | ina.fr

In 2012, he became Honorary President of Les Amis de Maurice Ravel. (Gabriel Yared, Président d’honneur des Amis de Maurice Ravel)

Yared was a member of the Jury at the 2017 Cannes Film Festival.

== Film scores ==
Yared is best known for his collaborations with the late Anthony Minghella. His first collaboration with Minghella was the 1996 film The English Patient, which was highly acclaimed and won him an Oscar for Best Original Score. He composed the scores for all of Minghella's subsequent films and the music for the television series The No. 1 Ladies' Detective Agency, co-created by Minghella and Richard Curtis.

Aside from his work with Minghella, Yared scored a number of other films, including Betty Blue (1986), Map of the Human Heart (1992), City of Angels (1998), Message in a Bottle (1999), Autumn in New York (2000), The Next Best Thing (2000), Possession (2002), and Bon Voyage (2003). He had a notable collaboration with René Laloux in the late 1980s on Gandahar and How Wang-fo was saved produced at the SEK Studio in North Korea.

Cassandra Clare reported in August 2012 that Yared was tapped to compose the score for The Mortal Instruments: City of Bones. However, he was eventually replaced on the project by Atli Örvarsson.

=== Troy soundtrack ===
In 2004, Yared's score for the film Troy was rejected less than a month before the film's opening as a result of the poor reception by a test screening audience. The test audience were said to have found Yared's music too "brassy and bold". James Horner, the composer of the scores for such films as Braveheart and Titanic was then hired to create a replacement score in less than four weeks.

Yared expressed his dismay at the score's rejection in an open letter which was posted on his website. He said that the score which the test audience had heard was not yet finished and mixed properly, and that the studio had given him no opportunity to alter his score in light of the audience's reaction.

Warner Bros. still owns the rights to Yared's Troy score and an official recording is not currently available and may never be (although selections from the score were briefly posted on Yared's website and private promotional CD).

Film score critic Christian Clemmensen of Filmtracks.com felt that Yared's work for Troy was far superior to what Horner had written, giving Horner's score a 3-star rating and Yared's a 5-star rating, saying that it was "outstanding," and called it the "pinnacle of Yared's career."

== Ballet scores ==
Yared created the score to the narrative ballet Raven Girl choreographed to the Royal Ballet by Wayne McGregor after the eponymous story by Audrey Niffenegger.

== Selected filmography ==
- Every Man for Himself (1980) Music
- Little Wars (1982) Music
- The Moon in the Gutter (1983) Music
- Hanna K. (1983)
- Dangerous Moves (1984) Music
- Le téléphone sonne toujours deux fois!! (1985) Music
- 37°2 le matin [Betty Blue] (1986) Music
- Beyond Therapy (1987) Music
- Agent trouble (1987) Music
- The Veiled Man (1987) Music
- Gandahar (1987) Music (not in US dubbed version Light Years)
- Une nuit à l'Assemblée Nationale (1988)
- Clean and Sober (1988) Music
- Camille Claudel (1988) Music
- Tennessee Waltz (Tennessee Nights) (1989)
- Romero (1989) Music
- Tatie Danielle (1990) Music and theme song "The Complaint of the Old Bitch" (sung by Catherine Ringer)
- Les 1001 Nuits (1990) Music
- Vincent & Theo (1990) Music
- The King's Whore (1990) Music
- L'Amant [The Lover] (1992) Music
- Map of the Human Heart (1992) Music
- IP5: L'île aux pachydermes (IP5: The Island of Pachyderms) (1992)
- La Fille de l'air (1992) Music
- Wings of Courage (1995)
- The English Patient (1996) Original Music
- City of Angels (1998) Music and Orchestrations
- Message in a Bottle (1999) Music and Orchestrations
- The Talented Mr. Ripley (1999) Music, Orchestrations and songs
- The Next Best Thing (2000) Music, Conductor and Orchestrations
- Autumn in New York (2000) Composed and Conductor
- Lisa (2001)
- Possession (2002) Composer, Conductor and Orchestrations
- The One and Only (2002)
- Bon voyage (2003) Music
- Sylvia (2003) Composer
- Cold Mountain (2003) Composed and Orchestrations
- Shall We Dance? (2004) Music
- Troy (2004) Composed and Orchestrated (Music Rejected from Final Film)
- Das Leben der Anderen (2006) Music
- Azur and Asmar (2006) Music
- Breaking and Entering (2006) Music (with Underworld)
- 1408 (2007) Music
- A Room with a View (2007)
- Adam Resurrected (2008)
- Coco Chanel & Igor Stravinsky (2009) Original music
- The Hedgehog (2009) Original music
- Amelia (2009) Original music
- The Tourist (2010) Original music - Score rejected; replaced by James Newton Howard. The movie does carry his track "Dance in F"
- In the Land of Blood and Honey (2011) Original music
- A Royal Affair (2012) Co-composed with Cyrille Aufort
- Haute Cuisine (French original title: Les Saveurs du Palais) (2012) Original music
- Belle du Seigneur (2012) Original Music
- Tom at the Farm (Tom à la ferme) (2013)
- A Promise (2013)
- In Secret (also known as Thérèse) (2013)
- The Prophet (2014) Original music
- By the Sea (2015) Original music
- Chocolat (2016)
- It's Only the End of the World (2016)
- The Promise (2016)
- If You Saw His Heart (Si tu voyais son coeur) (2017)
- The Happy Prince (2018)
- Dilili in Paris (2018)
- The Death and Life of John F. Donovan (2018)
- Judy (2019)
- The Life Ahead (La vita davanti a sé) (2020)
- Scarlet (L'envol) (2022)
- Just the Two of Us (2023) Original music

== Awards and nominations ==
Yared has been nominated for the Academy Award for Best Original Score on three occasions. He won for The English Patient in 1996. He was also nominated for The Talented Mr. Ripley (1999) and Cold Mountain (2003), but lost to John Corigliano and Howard Shore, respectively. He has also received three Golden Globe and three BAFTA nominations for the same films, and won both awards for The English Patient.

He has been nominated for two Grammy Awards, again winning for The English Patient.

Yared has been honored with numerous career achievement awards; Film Fest Gent – Joseph Plateau Honorary Award (2001), Prix France Musique-Sacem de la musique de film (2008), European Film Awards – European Achievement in World Cinema (2010), Prix Henri-Langlois (2016), Dubai International Film Festival – Lifetime Achievement Award (2016), Prix UCMF (Union des compositeurs de musiques de films) – Prix Hommage (2019), Hollywood in Vienna – Max Steiner Film Music Achievement Award (2019), Festival du Cinéma et Musique de Film de La Baule – Golden Ibis Award (Honorary Award): Ibis d’Or d’Honneur (2019), World Soundtrack Award – Lifetime Achievement (2020) and Les Plumes d’Or (hosted by APE, Association de la Presse Etrangère & UJC, Union des Journalistes de Cinéma) – Grand Prix de la Mémoire du Cinéma (2024).
