= If the Sun Never Returns =

- Directed by: Claude Goretta
- Written by: Claude Goretta
- Produced by: Sylvette Frydman; Jean-Marc Henchoz; Alain Sarde
- Starring: Charles Vanel Catherine Mouchet Philippe Léotard
- Cinematography: Bernard Zitzermann
- Production companies: Les Productions JMH; Marion's Films; Sara Films; RTS Radio Télévision Suisse
- Release date: 1987
- Running time: 118 minutes
- Countries: Switzerland; France
- Language: French

If the Sun Never Returns (French: Si le soleil ne revenait pas) is a 1987 Swiss-French film directed and written by Claude Goretta, based on Charles-Ferdinand Ramuz’s novel of the same name. It was entered into the main competition at the 44th Venice International Film Festival and was selected as the Swiss entry for the Best Foreign Language Film at the 60th Academy Awards.

== Synopsis ==
In a mountain village deep in a valley and deprived of sunlight for months at a time, an old man regarded as a prophet and sorcerer foretells that the sun will not return and that the village will sink into an endless winter. As panic spreads among the villagers, Isabelle resists the hysteria and urges them not to give in to fear or fate.

== Cast ==
The cast includes:

- Charles Vanel as Anzevui
- Catherine Mouchet as Isabelle Antide
- Philippe Léotard as Arlettaz
- Raoul Billerey as Denis Revaz
- Claude Evrard as Follonier

== Production ==
The film is based on Charles-Ferdinand Ramuz’s novel Si le soleil ne revenait pas.

== Reception ==
=== Awards and nominations ===
The film was selected as the Swiss entry for the Best Foreign Language Film at the 60th Academy Awards, but was not nominated.

=== Critical response ===
Filmdienst described the film as a mystified version of a weighty Heimatfilm of the 1950s, with beautiful images of the Swiss mountain landscape. It added that Goretta sets the villagers’ despair against an unshakeable belief in the continuation of life. The Guardian wrote that much of Goretta's later film work, including If the Sun Never Returns, remained little known outside francophone countries. The Los Angeles Times described the film as a “dour parable” set in a remote Swiss village and wrote that Goretta depicts the villagers' fears in somber tones, though it found the ending disappointing.

== Festival screenings ==
The film premiered in 1987 at the 44th Venice International Film Festival that year. In later years, it was screened at festivals including the 10th Neuchâtel International Fantastic Film Festival in 2010 and the 76th Locarno Film Festival in 2023, where Variety reported that the screening drew a packed audience, including young people.

== See also ==
- List of submissions to the 60th Academy Awards for Best Foreign Language Film
- List of Swiss submissions for the Academy Award for Best Foreign Language Film
