= The Job: Interviews with William S. Burroughs =

Book by Daniel Odier

- First English translation
- Author: Daniel Odier
- Subject: William S. Burroughs
- Publication date: 1969

The Job: Interviews with William S. Burroughs (French: Entretiens Avec William Burroughs) is a book by Daniel Odier built around an extensive series of interviews with Beat Generation author William S. Burroughs which concluded 15 November 1968. The topics range from Scientology to Burroughs' opinions of other writers, views on power, etc.

As Burroughs explains in a foreword, a series of impromptu interviews was expanded with previously-written material (some published, some not). "The result is interview form presented as a film with fade-outs and flash-back illustrating the answers. Burroughs' replies are hence discursive, extending the usual interview format to incorporate fiction. The contents vary between editions, as outlined below.

== Contents ==
The structure of the book is unorthodox. Here are the contents as present in the most recent (and most complete) Penguin edition.

- "Playback from Eden to Watergate"
- introduction
- "Author's Foreword"
- "One: Journey through time-space" including section
  - "Control"
- "Two: Prisoners of the earth come out" including section
  - "Don't have to think"
- "Three: A new frog"
- "Four: Academy 23" including sections
  - "Anti-junk"
  - "The invisible generation"
  - "Electronic revolution 1970-71"
  - "Scribe street"
  - "How to be Humphrey Bogart"

== Editions ==
Odier, Daniel (1969). Entretiens Avec William Burroughs. Paris: Editions Pierre Belfond.

Odier, Daniel (1970). The Job: Interviews with William Burroughs. New York: Grove Press. 189 pp.
First edition in English, with a printing of 5,000 copies. Hardbound black cloth w/ metallic-green lettering on spine, plus dust jacket. This is sometimes confusingly described as a "Revised and Enlarged Edition" since it has a new (one page) introduction by Burroughs.

Odier, Daniel (1970). The Job: Interview with William Burroughs. London: Jonathan Cape. 192 pp.
First British printing, hardbound. Note the singular "interview" in the title.

Odier, Daniel (1974). The Job: Interviews with William Burroughs. New York: Grove Press. 224 pp.
This is the actual Revised and Enlarged edition, which now includes "Playback from Eden to Watergate" and "Electronic Revolution". These are both taken from the 1970 publication The Electronic Revolution, published by Expanded Media Editions. "Playback from Eden to Watergate" has been rewritten from the original "Feedback from Watergate to the Garden of Eden".

Burroughs, William (1984). The Job: Topical Writings and Interviews. London: John Calder.
Contents unknown.

Odier, Daniel (1989). The Job: Interview with William Burroughs. New York: Penguin. 224 pp.
Contents as given above.
