= Catherine Mouchet =

French actress (born 1959)

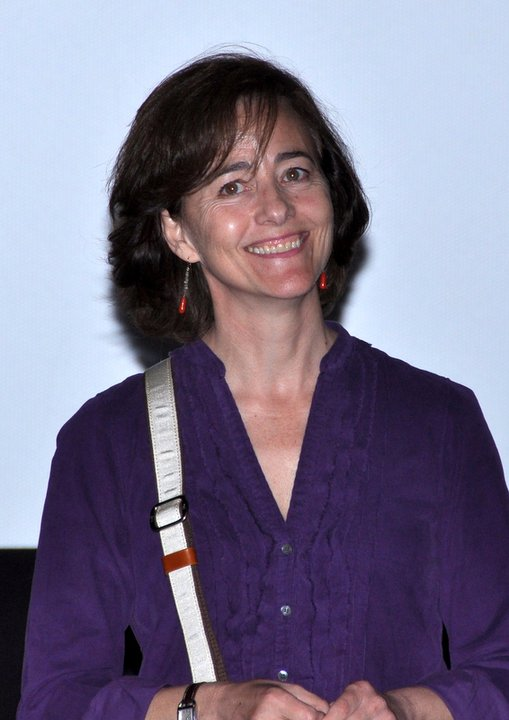
- Catherine Mouchet in 2011
- Born: 21 August 1959 (age 65); Paris, France
- Occupation: Actress

Catherine Mouchet (born 21 August 1959) is a French actress.

She studied at the Conservatoire de Paris, following the courses of Jacques Lassalle and Claude Régy. Her performance in the film Thérèse, directed by Alain Cavalier, won her the César Award for Most Promising Actress for 1987.

== Career ==
Having been acclaimed for her appearance in Thérèse, she next appeared in Claude Goretta's Si le soleil ne revenait pas in 1987, and then devoted herself to theatre for a time. She appeared in works by Luigi Pirandello, (Vêtir ceux qui sont nus), and Alfred de Musset, (Les Caprices de Marianne), amongst others, and directed La Petite dame with Claude Guyonnet in 1992. She returned to the screen in Jean-Pierre Mocky's Bonsoir 1993, and in Louis and Xavier Bachelot's short film La Plante. On television she appeared in the saga Jalna, directed by Philippe Monnier from the books of Mazo de la Roche, and Le blanc à lunettes, directed by Édouard Nierman, from a Georges Simenon novel. She then studied for a degree in philosophy.

She returned to the screen and played supporting roles in two Olivier Assayas films, Fin août, début septembre and Les Destinées sentimentales. She appeared in Pierre Jolivet's My Little Business, for which she received a nomination for the César Award for Best Supporting Actress, and Philippe Harel's 1999 Extension du domaine de la lutte, an adaptation of Michel Houellebecq's controversial breakthrough novel Whatever, in which she played a psychoanalyst. She played a prostitute in Patrice Leconte's Rue des Plaisirs. She continues to appear in a wide variety of roles in both auteur films and popular comedies, and for both first time directors and established talents.

In October 2008 Mouchet appeared at the Théâtre National de Strasbourg in Jean Magnan's "et pourtant ce silence ne pouvait être vide", based, like Jean Genet's The Maids, on the Papin sisters murders in 1933.

== Filmography ==
- Thérèse 1986
- Si le soleil ne revenait pas (If the Sun Never Returns) 1987
- La plante short film 1993
- Bonsoir 1993
- Jalna (TV) 1994
- Le blanc à lunettes (TV) 1995
- Fin août, début septembre 1998
- Whatever (Extension du domaine de la lutte) 1999
- My Little Business 1999
- J'ai tué Clémence Acéra 2000
- Du Côté des filles 2000
- Les Destinées sentimentales 2000
- La Danse des asperges sarrasines short film 2000
- Mortel transfert 2001
- Le Pornographe 2001
- Rue des plaisirs 2001
- HS Hors Service 2001
- Elle est des nôtres 2002
- Petites coupures 2002
- The Repentant 2002
- Ecrivain d'O 2004
- Nos Vies Rêvées (TV) 2004
- Coup de vache (TV) 2004
- Nature contre nature (TV) 2004
- Un Jour d'été (TV film) 2005
- Au royaume des aveugles short film (2005)
- Madame Irma 2006
- Les Deux Mondes 2007
- Clémentine (2008)
- Dans tes bras (2009)
- L'Arbre et la Forêt (2009)
- Pigalle, la nuit (TV) (2009)
- Dumas (2010)
- The Monk (2011) adapted from Matthew Lewis's gothic novel The Monk.
- Le Désert de l'amour (The desert of love) (TV film) (2012) directed by Jean-Daniel Verhaeghe
- Clash (TV) (2012)
- Les petits meurtres d'Agatha Christie (TV) (2013)
- Mon Amie Victoria (2014), directed by Jean-Paul Civeyrac, from a novella by Doris Lessing
- Marguerite & Julien (2015)
- Looking for Her (2016)
- Reinventing Marvin (2017)
- The Ties That Bind Us (2024)
