= Élizabeth Bourgine =

French actress

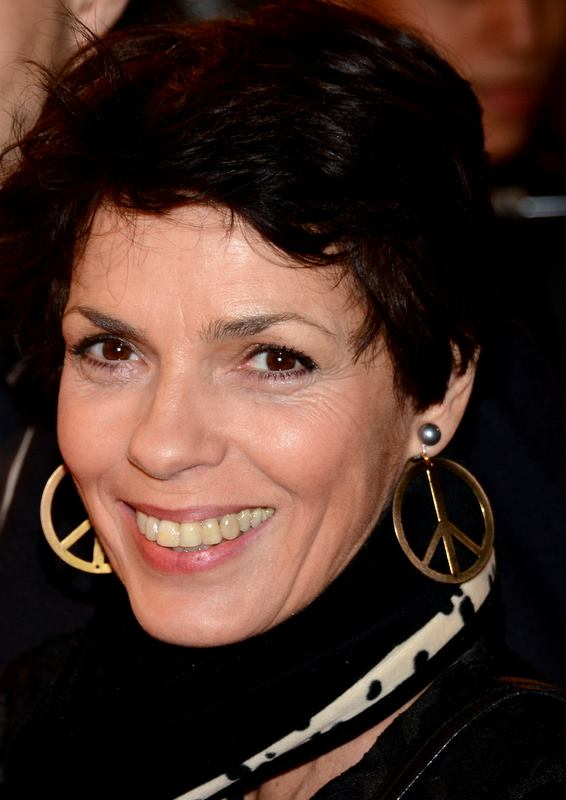
- Bourgine in 2013.
- Born: Élizabeth Clémentine Madeleine Bourgine; 20 March 1957 (age 69); Levallois-Perret, France
- Occupation: Actress
- Spouse: Jean-Luc Miesch
- Children: Jules

Élizabeth Clémentine Madeleine Bourgine (born 20 March 1957 in Levallois-Perret, Hauts-de-Seine) is a French actress, appearing in film, television and theatre. She is credited with more than 60 roles in film and television, mostly French productions.

== Career ==
Originally a dancer and model, she studied at École des Beaux-Arts. She first appeared in student films between 1976 and 1977 until landing a role in the film Nestor Burma, with her future husband, the French director and actor Jean-Luc Miesch.

She was awarded the Prix Romy Schneider Prize in 1985.

Since 2011, she has appeared as Catherine Bordey in the joint French and British production Death in Paradise, a crime drama/comedy filmed in Guadeloupe for BBC One.

She is best known in France for her roles in A Heart in Winter (1992), My Best Friend (2006) and Private Classes (1986).

== Select filmography ==
- 1994: Maigret :Episode 12 Maigret and the Phantom : Mirella Jonker
- 2006: My Best Friend : Julia
- 2006 Private Classes : Jeanne Kern
- 2013: Joséphine, ange gardien : Jeanne (1 Episode)
- 2011–present: Death in Paradise : Catherine Bordey (Season one: recurring, season two onwards: mayor of Honoré, the main town of Saint Marie.)
- 2015: Le vagabond de la Baie de Somme: Mathilde De Wan
- 2019: Meurtres dans le Jura: Laura Prieur
- 2019: Les mystères du Bois Galant: Françoise Thélier
- 2020: Maigret : Irène
- 2021: Les mystères de l'école de gendarmerie: Françoise Thélier

== Personal life ==
Bourgine was born 20 March 1957, in Levallois-Perret, a suburb of Paris. She is married to Jean-Luc Miesch, and they have one adult son, Jules, who is also an actor.
