= Mauvais Sang =

- Movie Poster ©AAA Classics 1986
- Directed by: Leos Carax
- Written by: Leos Carax
- Produced by: Denis Chateau; Alain Dahan; Philippe Diaz
- Starring: Michel Piccoli; Juliette Binoche; Denis Lavant
- Cinematography: Jean-Yves Escoffier
- Edited by: Nelly Quettier
- Music by: Benjamin Britten; David Bowie; Sergei Prokofiev
- Distributed by: AAA Classics
- Release date: 26 November 1986
- Running time: 116 minutes
- Country: France
- Language: French

Mauvais Sang (French pronunciation: [movɛ sɑ̃], Bad Blood), also known as The Night Is Young, is Leos Carax's second film. Released in 1986, the film played at the 37th Berlin International Film Festival before being nominated for three César Awards and winning the Prix Louis-Delluc. The film sold 504,803 tickets in France. The title refers to Arthur Rimbaud's poem in A Season in Hell.

== Plot ==
In the Paris of the not-too-distant future, a mysterious sexually transmitted disease called STBO is killing people who have sex without emotional involvement. A serum has been developed, but it is locked away out of the reach of those who need it. An American woman blackmails two aging crooks, Marc and Hans, into stealing it from a pharmaceutical company's offices. Marc recruits Alex, a rebellious teenager whose father worked for him before his death. Alex has a girlfriend, Lise, but falls for Marc's lover, Anna.

== Cast ==
- Michel Piccoli as Marc
- Juliette Binoche as Anna
- Denis Lavant as Alex
- Hans Meyer as Hans
- Julie Delpy as Lise
- Carroll Brooks as The American woman
- Hugo Pratt as Boris
- Mireille Perrier as The young mother
- Serge Reggiani as Charlie
- Jérôme Zucca as Thomas

== Production ==
Julie Delpy has said she came out of filming traumatized: "It was a very difficult shoot. I had a motorcycle accident. In order to make the insurance work, I wasn't taken to the doctor right away. As a result, my leg became gangrenous—one more day and it was amputation. Moreover Leos Carax was not easy. The actress was not easy either."

Christian Faure was the assistant director of the movie.

The soundtrack includes music by Sergei Prokofiev, Benjamin Britten, and David Bowie.

== Accolades ==
Year	Association	Award category	Recipient	Result	Ref(s)
1986	Cahiers du Cinéma	Annual Top 10 Lists	Leos Carax	5th place	
1986	Prix Louis Delluc	Best Film	Leos Carax	Won	
1987	Berlin International Film Festival	Alfred Bauer Prize	Leos Carax	Won	
1987	Berlin International Film Festival	C.I.C.A.E Award	Leos Carax	Honoured	
1987	Berlin International Film Festival	Golden Bear (Competition)	Leos Carax	Nominated	
1987	César Awards	Best Actress	Juliette Binoche	Nominated	
1987	César Awards	Best Promising Actress	Julie Delpy	Nominated	
1987	César Awards	Best Cinematography	Jean-Yves Escoffier	Nominated	
1988	Fantasporto	International Fantasy Film Special Jury Award	Leos Carax	Nominated	
