= Outlaws (1985 film) =

Hors-la-loi Outlaws
- Theatrical release poster
- Directed by: Robin Davis
- Written by: Robin Davis
- Starring: Clovis Cornillac
- Cinematography: Jacques Steyn
- Edited by: Marie Castro
- Music by: Philippe Sarde
- Distributed by: AMLF
- Release date: 1985
- Running time: 144 minutes
- Country: France
- Language: French

Outlaws (French:Hors-la-loi) is a 1985 film by French director Robin Davis, starring Clovis Cornillac.

== Cast ==
- Clovis Cornillac ... Roland (as Clovis)
- Wadeck Stanczak ... Christian
- Nathalie Spilmont ... Ida
- Isabelle Pasco ... Sissi
- Pascal Librizzi ... Maxime
- Jean-Claude Tran ... Loulou
- Joël Ferraty ... Néné
- Philippe Chambon ... Eric
- Didier Chambragne ... Alain
- Steven Ronceau ... Milou
- Luc Thuillier ... Rémi
- Luis-Miguel Marques ... Bernard
- Hatem Boussa ... Mehmet
- Gilles Stassart ... Nehru
- Kamel Meziti ... Mattouk
