= Diva (1981 film) =

1981 French thriller film by Jean-Jacques Beineix

- Film poster
- Directed by: Jean-Jacques Beineix
- Screenplay by: Jean-Jacques Beineix; Jean Van Hamme
- Based on: Diva by Daniel Odier
- Produced by: Claudie Ossard; Irène Silberman; Serge Silberman
- Starring: Frédéric Andréi; Wilhelmenia Wiggins Fernandez; Richard Bohringer; Thuy An Luu
- Cinematography: Philippe Rousselot
- Edited by: Monique Prim; Marie-Josèphe Yoyotte
- Music by: Vladimir Cosma
- Production companies: Les Films Galaxie; Greenwich Film Productions
- Distributed by: Compagnie Commerciale Française Cinématographique
- Release date: 11 March 1981 (France)
- Running time: 117 minutes
- Country: France
- Languages: French; English
- Budget: $1.5 million
- Box office: $19.8 million

Diva is a 1981 French thriller film directed by Jean-Jacques Beineix, adapted from the novel Diva by Daniel Odier. It eschewed the realist mood of the 1970s French cinema and instead adopted a colourful, melodic style, later described as cinéma du look. The mixture of "film noir, opera and art-house styles" did not please the producers, but was more to the liking of the Canadian audience at the Toronto International Film Festival where it was screened and achieved a "Critics' Choice" in 1981.

The film made a successful debut in France in 1981 with 2,281,569 admissions, and also had success in the U.S. the next year, grossing $2,678,103. The film was selected as the French entry for the Best Foreign Language Film at the 54th Academy Awards, but was not nominated. Diva became a cult classic and was internationally acclaimed.

== Plot ==
A young Parisian postman, Jules, is obsessed with opera and particularly with Cynthia Hawkins, a beautiful and celebrated American soprano who has never allowed her singing to be recorded. Jules attends a recital where Hawkins sings the aria "Ebben? Ne andrò lontana" from the opera La Wally. He covertly makes a high-quality bootleg recording of her performance using a Nagra professional tape-recorder. Afterwards, he steals the gown she was wearing from her dressing room.

Later, Jules accidentally comes into possession of an audio cassette with the recorded testimony of a prostitute, Nadia, which exposes a senior police officer, Commissaire divisionnaire Jean Saporta, as the boss of a drug trafficking and prostitution racket. Nadia drops the cassette in the bag of the postman's moped moments before she is murdered by Saporta's two henchmen, "L' Antillais" and "Le Curé" ("The West Indian" and "The Priest").

Police officers Paula and Zatopek are now after Jules. They seek Nadia's cassette as they know it incriminates a prominent gangster. But they are unaware the gangster is actually their boss. Jules is also being hunted by Saporta's two henchmen, as well as by two Taiwanese men who want his unique and valuable recording of Cynthia Hawkins. Jules seeks refuge from all these pursuers with two new friends, a mysterious bohemian named Serge Gorodish and his companion, Alba, a young Vietnamese-French thief.

Jules decides to return Cynthia Hawkins' dress at her luxury hotel. She is initially angry, but eventually forgives him. She is intrigued by Jules' adoration and a kind of romantic relationship develops, expressed by the background of a piano instrumental, as they walk around Paris in the Jardin des Tuileries early one morning. The Taiwanese try to blackmail Cynthia into signing a recording contract with them. Although they do not possess Jules' recording of her performance, they claim they do and threaten to release it as a pirated record if she does not cooperate; she indignantly refuses.

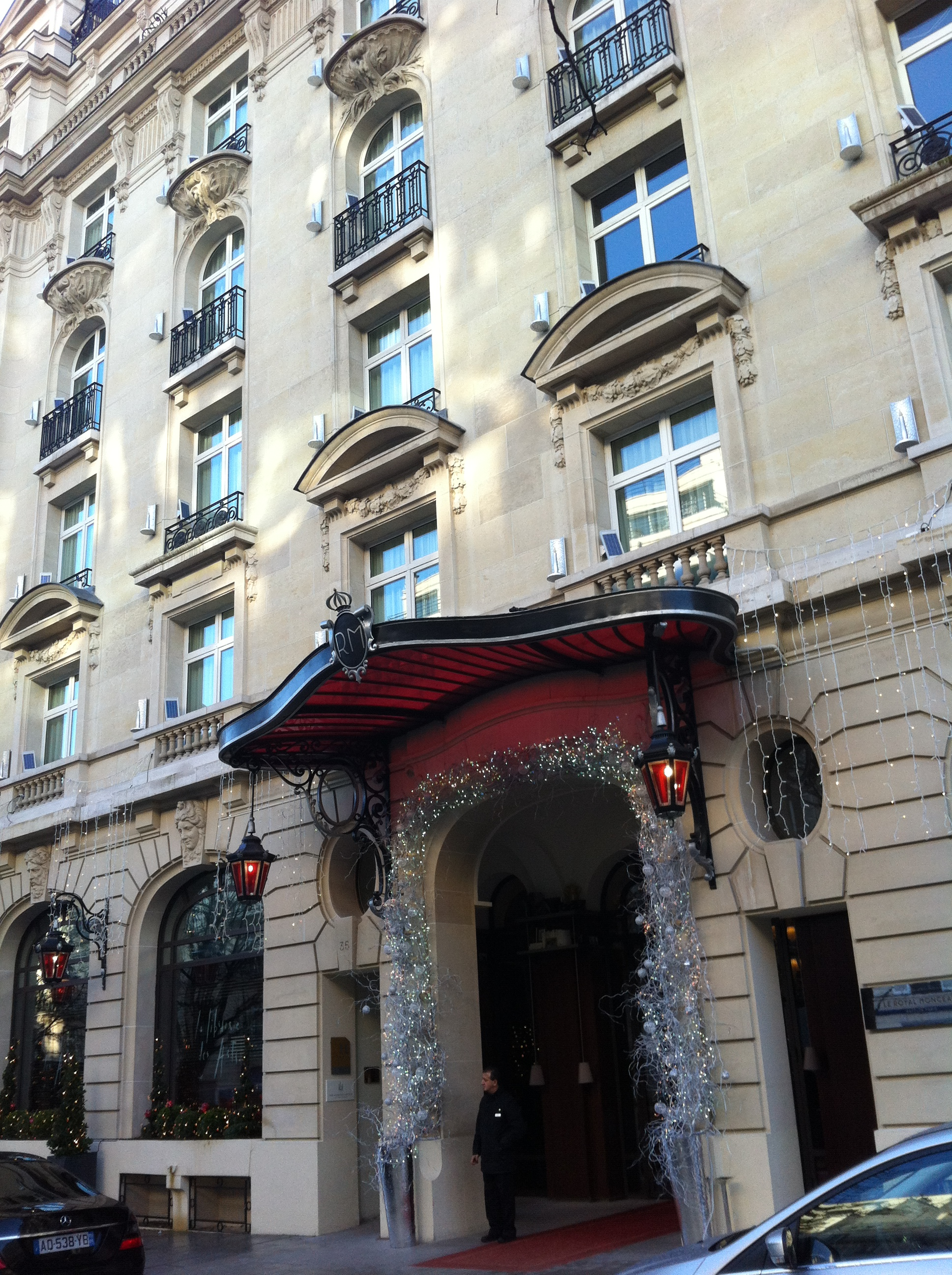
The Hotel Royal Monceau, the luxury hotel in Paris that Cynthia stays at.

Jules is spotted and chased by the two police officers but he escapes by riding his moped through the Paris Métro system. He takes refuge in the apartment of a prostitute friend (an unnamed character) but flees when he realizes she is part of Saporta's criminal network and will likely betray him; he leaves just before L' Antillais and Le Curé arrive. The enforcers catch up with him and Jules is shot but Gorodish rescues Jules just before Le Curé can kill him. Gorodish and Alba drive the wounded Jules to a safe house outside Paris, a remote lighthouse, in Gorodish's antique Citroën Traction Avant.

Gorodish now has the cassette recording that incriminates Saporta and he uses it to blackmail the Commissaire. The two meet in a large, abandoned factory; Saporta pays off Gorodish, but intends to kill him – before the meeting, he had placed a remote control bomb in the back of Gorodish's car. The two Taiwanese interrupt them and steal the cassette at gunpoint, believing it to be Jules' recording of Cynthia Hawkins. They attempt to drive away in Gorodish's car but are killed when Saporta detonates his bomb with the intention of killing Gorodish. Gorodish then drives away in an identical Citroën that he had hidden in advance, showing he had likely anticipated these events.

Meanwhile, Jules returns to Paris to give Cynthia his bootleg recording but L'Antillais and Le Curé are lying in wait for him outside her hotel. They abduct Jules and take him back to his loft apartment with the intention of killing him there and faking his suicide. However, police officer Paula has been keeping Jules' apartment under surveillance; she saves him by killing Le Curé and wounding L'Antillais. Saporta then appears. He kills his surviving henchman and attempts to kill Jules and Paula, intending to make it look like his henchmen shot them. Gorodish once again saves the day by turning out the lights and tricking Saporta into stepping into an empty elevator shaft and falling to his death.

At the end of the film, Jules meets Cynthia at an empty theatre where he plays the La Wally recording for her. She expresses her nervousness about it because she had "never heard [herself] sing."

== Cast ==
- Frédéric Andréi as Jules
- Wilhelmenia Fernandez (billed as Wilhelmenia Wiggins Fernandez) as Cynthia Hawkins
- Richard Bohringer as Gorodish
- Thuy An Luu as Alba
- Jacques Fabbri as Police Commissaire Jean Saporta
- Dominique Pinon as Le Curé ("The Priest")
- Gérard Darmon as L'Antillais ("The West Indian")
- Jim Adhi Limas (in French) as the first Taiwanese man
- Anny Romand as Police officer Paula
- Patrick Floersheim as Police officer Zatopek
- Jean-Jacques Moreau as Krantz, a police informer
- Chantal Deruaz as Nadia
- Roland Bertin as Weinstadt, Cynthia Hawkins' manager
- Jean-Luc Porraz as Mermoz, a friend of Jules
- Laure Duthilleul as Mermoz's friend
- Dominique Besnehard as record store employee
- Isabelle Mergault as the girl playing an arcade game

== Production ==
Diva was Beineix's first feature film: he had acted as assistant to directors such as Claude Berri, René Clément and Claude Zidi. However, Diva represented "a constant battle between his digressive, imagistic, 'baroque' imagination and his producer's insistence on a tight thriller." The producers hated the title, aspects of Beineix's style, and their disappointment meant that the film was almost not distributed at all.

The contemporary style of the film was "hyper-realist, post-punk visual style - overlooking, perhaps, the traditions of humanism and genre cinema, the policier, in which the film is rooted". Moreover, "Pop Art decors, offbeat locations, selective colours and idiosyncratic compositions are assertively used to create a fantasy world which is only a sidestep from crime movie realism..." Another critic noted that "...the seduction of Diva is in its extraordinary sets and the way in which, through combinations of light, shadow, spatial relations, carefully chosen and positioned objects, forms and graphics and matched colours, something is created which is distinctly otherworldly while being firmly, almost prosaically, situated in the real world".

Beineix described some of the more fantastic, even improbable elements of the film, such as Gorodish replacing his glamorous white Citroën car with an identical one after the first has been exploded killing two villains, as those of "a character manipulating the plot from within". Auty suggests that in some ways "the dramatic structure is strikingly close to the operatic form and it is entirely appropriate that the film should end in an opera-house".

In a major change in an otherwise faithful adaptation of the Odier novel, Jules and Gorodish no longer split the proceeds after selling the illicit tape to the highest bidder.

It was the only film of Wilhelmenia Fernandez, the first of Dominique Pinon, and the first leading role of Frédéric Andréi.

=== Filming ===
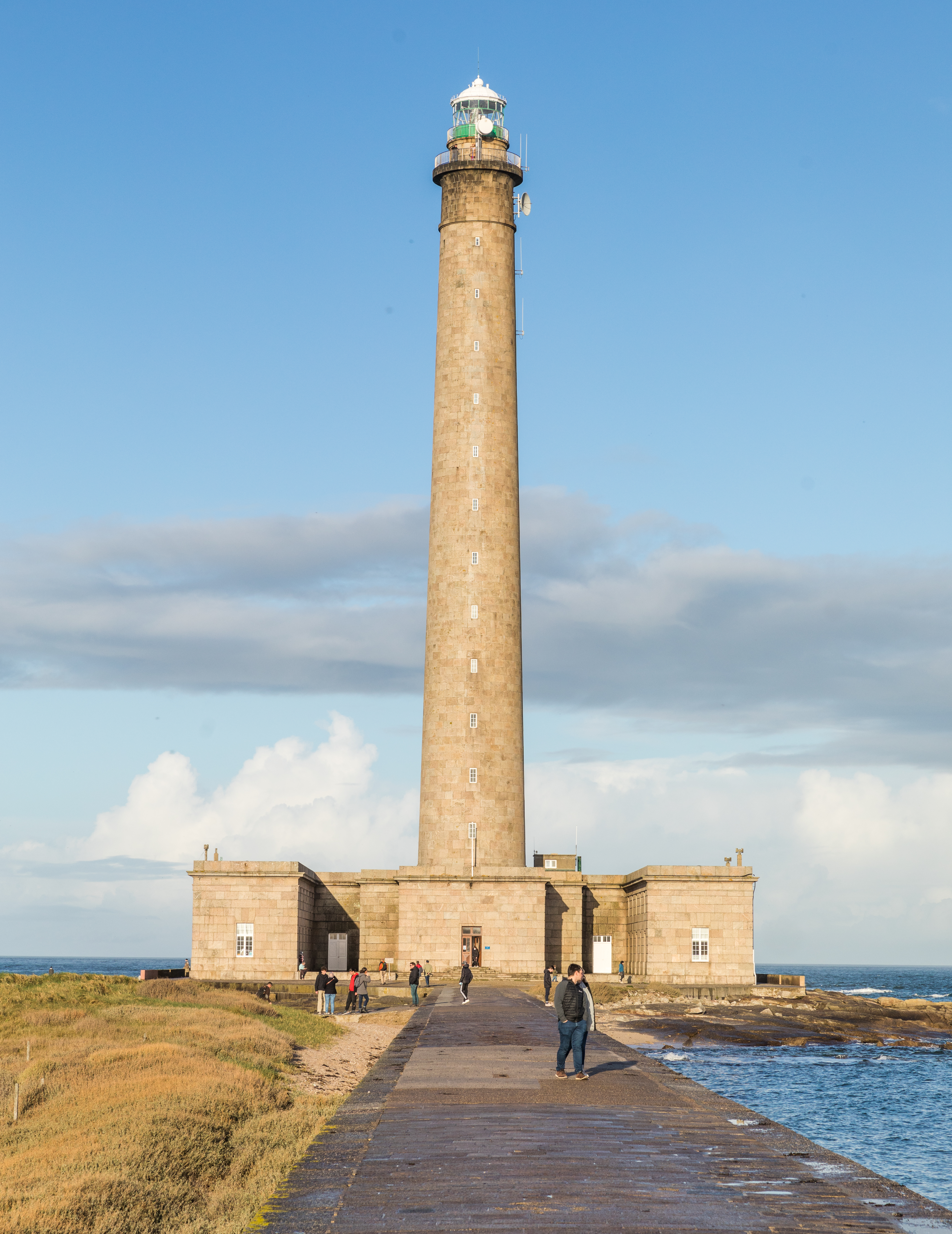
The Phare de Gatteville, the safehouse Jules is taken to by Gorodish and Alba

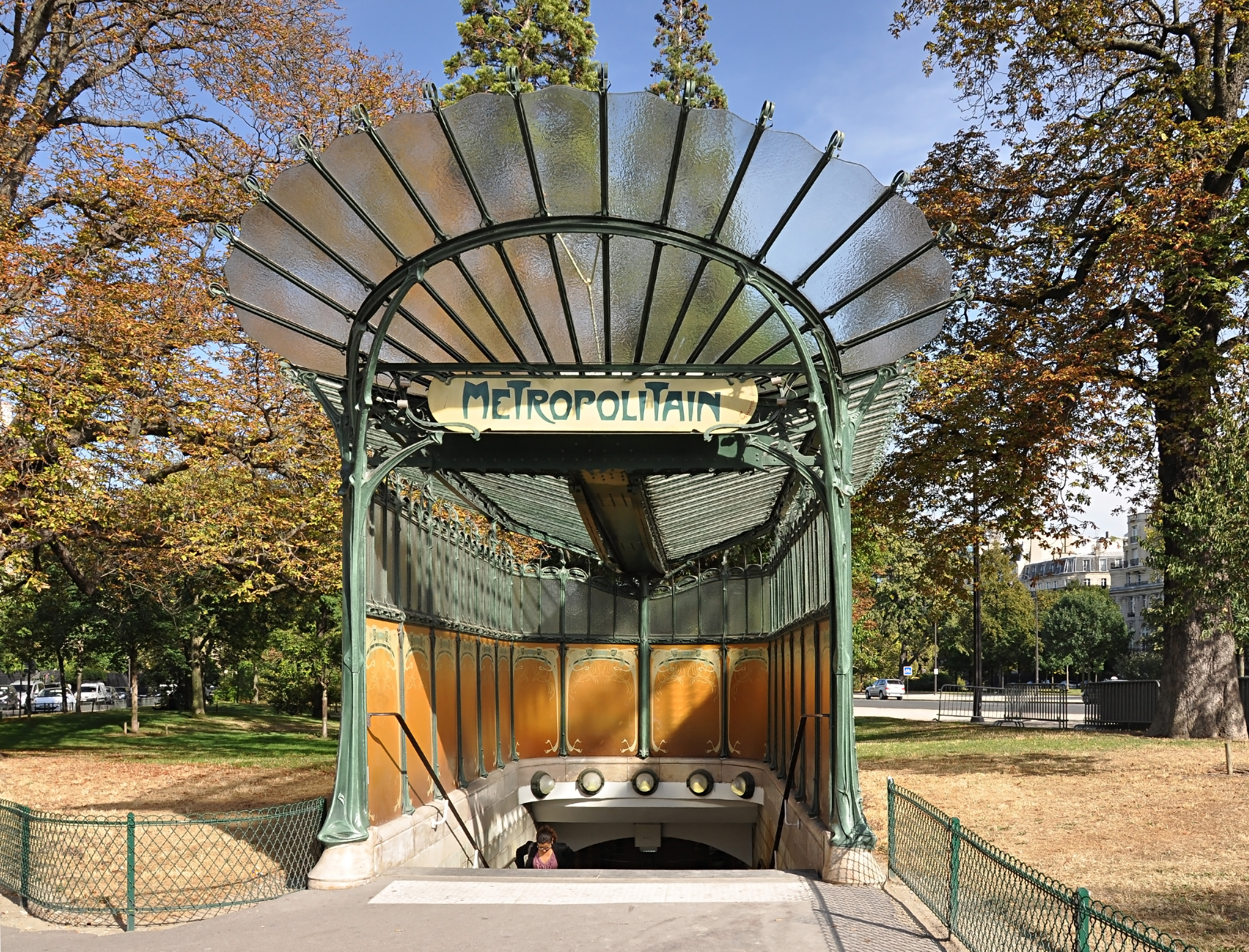
The Porte Dauphne entrance, one of the well-known Paris Métro entrances by Hector Guimard, where Jules meets his prostitute friend and asks to stay at her apartment

In his use of locations, Beineix integrates two strong urban environments – the Paris familiar through film, in such settings as the Place de la Concorde and the adjacent Tuileries Gardens; and the modern city, with its parking lots, disused warehouses, metro stations and pinball arcades – through which the action pushes Jules, for example from his barely-furnished loft apartment to the neo-classical hotel suite of the opera singer, "redolent of the grand operatic tradition". Almost all of the film was shot in Paris and makes use of several well-known city landmarks.

The public recital by Cynthia Hawkins takes place at the Théâtre des Bouffes du Nord. At the time the theatre was notable for the run-down appearance of its interior, as it had been damaged by a fire and left derelict. In the 1970s it was revived by British theatrical director Peter Brook and French producer Micheline Rozan, who deliberately retained the rough interior for its distressed and damaged appearance.

Nadia is killed outside the Gare Saint-Lazare railway station, where she had just arrived with the intention of handing her incriminating cassette to Krantz, a police informer. Later, Jules meets Alba for the first time in a record shop on the Champs Elysées, the "Lido Musique", where he sees her shoplifting records. Jules returns Cynthia's dress to her at the luxury hotel Le Royal Monceau, built in 1928.

In many scenes Jules rides a moped through Paris. Initially, he is seen with one of the standard yellow livery of the French postal service, a Motobécane AV 88, that Jules has fitted with a Spirit of Ecstasy mascot. The police and others looking for him refer to it as his "Mobylette", a Motobécane model name. He later borrows a newer, Italian-made red Malaguti Firebird from a friend. He uses this bike to flee from his pursuers through the Paris Metro, in the chase scene that was filmed at the Concorde, Châtelet, and Opéra stations. This sequence ends at the Place de l'Opéra, where Jules dumps the moped and flees on foot.

One of the few filming locations outside Paris is the lighthouse where Jules is taken by Alba and Gorodish, Phare de Gatteville on the Normandy coast. The third tallest lighthouse in the world, it is still in active use and can be climbed by the public, and also now serves as a museum.

The meeting between Gorodish and Saporta in a disused factory was shot at the former Citroën car factory in the 15th arrondissement of Paris. The factory had ceased production in 1975 and was in the process of being demolished when the film was made. The site is now the Parc André-Citroën.

=== Music ===
Following her appearance as Musetta in La bohème at the Paris Opera in 1979, Wiggins Fernandez's singing in the film introduced the aria Ebben? Ne andrò lontana (Well then? I'll go far away) from Alfredo Catalani's opera La Wally to millions.

As well as the Catalani aria sung by Wiggins Fernandez and Vladimir Cosma's original soundtrack played by the London Symphony Orchestra conducted by the composer, the film also includes a piano movement entitled 'Promenade Sentimentale' played by Cosma. At the very start of the film an operatic excerpt plays over the credits (the prelude to Gounod's Faust), but is cut off when Jules switches off the cassette player on his moped. Highlights of the soundtrack also include a pastiche of Erik Satie's Gymnopédies composed by Cosma.

Following Diva, Cosma would win his second music César for Le Bal, two years later.

== Home video ==
The film was released on DVD on 29 May 2001 by Anchor Bay Entertainment.

A Blu-ray edition was released by Kino Lorber on 11 August 2020.

== Reception and legacy ==
=== Initial reaction ===
The film initially was not a commercial success after its March 1981 release in France, where it faced bad press and a hostile reception by critics. However, French audiences slowly grew after it was released in the United States and found success there. Diva played for a year in Paris theaters. David Denby, in New York, upon its 1982 American release, wrote "One of the most audacious and original films to come out of France in recent years...Diva must be the only pop movie inspired by a love of opera."

Film critic Roger Ebert gave it four out of four stars and praised its cast of characters. He called Beineix "a director with an enormous gift for creating visual images" and elaborated on his filmmaking:

The movie is filled with so many small character touches, so many perfectly observed intimacies, so many visual inventions—from the sly to the grand—that the thriller plot is just a bonus. In a way, it doesn't really matter what this movie is about; Pauline Kael has compared Beineix to Orson Welles and, as Welles so often did, he has made a movie that is a feast to look at, regardless of its subject. [...] Here is a director taking audacious chances, doing wild and unpredictable things with his camera and actors, just to celebrate moviemaking.

— Roger Ebert

Ebert also praised the film's chase scene through the Paris metro, writing that it "deserves ranking with the all-time classics, Raiders of the Lost Ark, The French Connection, and Bullitt."

=== Retrospect ===
Since its re-release in 2007, Diva has received acclaim from film critics. Review aggregator Rotten Tomatoes gives the film a score of 97% based on reviews from 59 critics. The website's critical consensus states: "Beineix combines unique cinematography, an intelligent script, and a brilliant soundtrack to make Diva a stylishly memorable film".

David Russell asserts that the film is by far Beineix's best and is "probably one of the most important films of the 1980s". Lisa Schwarzbaum of Entertainment Weekly gave it an A rating and praised its "voluptuous romanticism". She wrote of the film's visual ties to cinéma du look, "the movie's mad excitement hinges entirely on the pleasure to be had in moving our eye from one gorgeously composed stage set of artifice to another."

=== Awards ===
- César Awards:
  - Best Debut: Jean-Jacques Beineix
  - Music: Vladimir Cosma
  - Cinematography: Philippe Rousselot
  - Sound: Jean-Pierre Ruh

The film was entered into the 12th Moscow International Film Festival.

== See also ==
- List of cult films
- List of French submissions for the Academy Award for Best Foreign Language Film
- List of submissions to the 54th Academy Awards for Best Foreign Language Film
- Postmodernist film
