= Jean-Jacques Beineix =

French film director (1946–2022)

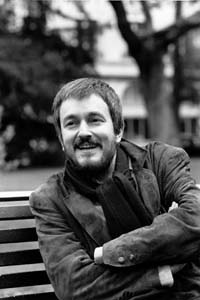
- Beineix in 1989
- Born: 8 October 1946; Paris, France
- Died: 13 January 2022 (aged 75); Paris, France
- Occupation: Film director
- Years active: 1977–2022

Jean-Jacques Beineix (French: [bɛnɛks]; 8 October 1946 – 13 January 2022) was a French film director best known for the films Diva and Betty Blue. His work is regarded as a prime example of the cinéma du look film movement in France.

== Early life and education ==
Jean-Jacques Beineix was the son of Robert Beineix, director of an insurance company, and wife Madeleine Maréchal. He was a student at both the Lycée Carnot and Lycée Condorcet in Paris. After earning his baccalaureat, he enrolled in medical school, but dropped out after the events of May 1968. He took the competitive entrance exam for the Paris film school Institut des hautes études cinématographiques (IDHEC), but failed it (his final rank was 21st).

== Career ==
Jean-Jacques Beineix began his career in 1964 as Jean Becker's assistant director on the popular French TV series Les Saintes chéries. He remained with the series for three years. In 1970, he worked for Claude Berri and, the following year, for Claude Zidi. In 1972, he was second assistant director on the Jerry Lewis drama The Day the Clown Cried.

In 1977, Beineix directed his first short movie, Le Chien de M. Michel, which won first prize at the Trouville Festival. In 1980, Beineix directed his first feature film, Diva, which received four Césars. The film was also entered in the 12th Moscow International Film Festival. Diva is considered the first film of what was later described as the cinéma du look. Film critic Ginette Vincendeau described the films made by Beineix and others as "youth-oriented films with high production values.... The look of the cinéma du look refers to the films' high investment in non-naturalistic, self-conscious aesthetics, notably intense colours and lighting effects. Their spectacular (studio based) and technically brilliant mise-en-scène is usually put to the service of romantic plots." The cinéma du look also included the films of Luc Besson and Léos Carax.

His second feature, Moon in the Gutter, was nominated for the Palme d'Or at the 1983 Cannes Festival. Nominated for three Césars in 1984, it would win one award in the Best Production Design category.

In 1986, Beineix directed Betty Blue (original title: 37°2 le matin), in which Béatrice Dalle and Jean-Hugues Anglade starred. In 1987, it was nominated for the Best Foreign Language Film Oscar, in the same category as that year's British Academy Film Awards and Golden Globes. It won the 1986 Montréal World Film Festival's Grand Prix des Amériques and Most Popular Film awards and, in 1987, the Boston Society of Film Critics award for best foreign language film. It also received the Best Poster award, one of nine Césars for which it was nominated. Beineix directed Roselyne and the Lions in 1989, IP5: L'île aux pachydermes in 1992, and Mortel Transfert in 2001. The 1992 Seattle International Film Festival awarded Beineix its Golden Space Needle Award for Best Director for both Betty Blue and IP5: L'île aux pachydermes.

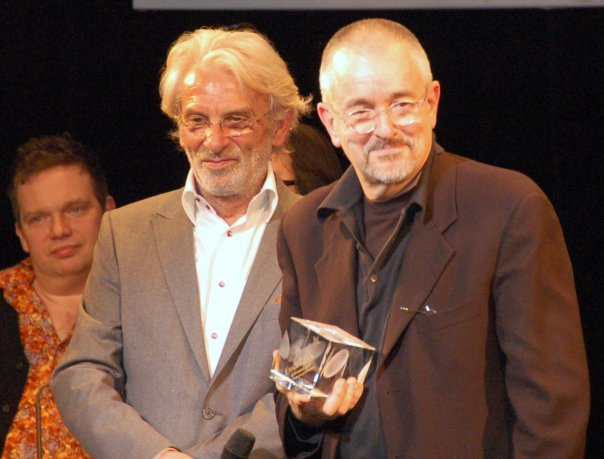
Jean-Jacques Beineix, Étoiles d'or du cinéma français, (February 2009)

In 1984 Beineix formed his own production company, Cargo Films, in order to retain his artistic independence. Betty Blue (37°2 le matin) was his first film produced by Cargo, and he became executive producer of all its projects. The company produces feature films and documentaries on a wide variety of themes from science to art, to women's rights and social problems. He worked in partnership with national scientific organizations such as CNES and CNRS to produce documentaries.

In 2008, Beineix directed a corporate film for CNRS, 2 infinities (L2i). It was shown at the October 2008 New York Imagine Science film festival.

== Personal life ==
Beineix was married to his wife, Agnès. He had one child, daughter Frida, from his previous relationship with actress Valentina Sauca.

In 2006, Beineix published a first volume of his autobiography, Les Chantiers de la gloire (in French only). The title alluded to the French title of Stanley Kubrick's film Les Sentiers de la gloire (Paths of Glory).

Beineix died from leukemia at his home in Paris on 13 January 2022, at the age of 75.

== Filmography ==
- 1977 - Le Chien de Monsieur Michel - short movie
- 1981 - Diva - starring Wilhelmenia Wiggins Fernandez, Frédéric Andréi
- 1983 - Moon in the Gutter - starring Gérard Depardieu, Nastassja Kinski
- 1986 - Betty Blue - starring Jean-Hugues Anglade, Béatrice Dalle
- 1989 - Roselyne and the Lions - starring Isabelle Pasco, Philippe Clévenot
- 1992 - Les Enfants de Roumanie - documentary
- 1992 - IP5: L'île aux pachydermes - starring Yves Montand, Olivier Martinez
- 1994 - Otaku : fils de l'empire du virtuel - documentary
- 1994 - Place Clichy sans complexe - documentary
- 1997 - Assigné à résidence - documentary
- 2001 - Mortal Transfer - starring Jean-Hugues Anglade, Hélène de Fougerolles
