= Betty Blue =

1986 film by Jean-Jacques Beineix

- Theatrical release poster
- French: 37°2 le matin
- Directed by: Jean-Jacques Beineix
- Screenplay by: Jean-Jacques Beineix
- Based on: 37°2 le matin by Philippe Djian
- Produced by: Jean-Jacques Beineix
- Starring: Jean-Hugues Anglade; Béatrice Dalle; Gérard Darmon
- Cinematography: Jean-François Robin
- Edited by: Monique Prim
- Music by: Gabriel Yared
- Production companies: Constellation Productions; Cargo Films
- Distributed by: Gaumont Distribution
- Release date: 9 April 1986
- Running time: 120 minutes; 185 minutes (director's cut)
- Country: France
- Language: French
- Box office: $2 million

Betty Blue (French: 37°2 le matin, lit. '37.2° in the Morning') is a 1986 French erotic psychological drama film written and directed by Jean-Jacques Beineix, based on the 1985 novel 37°2 le matin by Philippe Djian. The film stars Jean-Hugues Anglade and Béatrice Dalle. It was the eighth highest-grossing film of 1986 in France.

The film received both a BAFTA Award and an Academy Award nomination for Best Foreign Language Film in 1987.

== Plot ==
Zorg, an aspiring writer in his 30s, makes a living as a handyman for a community of beach houses in the seaside resort of Gruissan on France's Mediterranean coast. He meets Betty, a volatile and impulsive 19-year-old woman, and the two begin a passionate affair, living in his borrowed shack on the beach. Following a row with him where she tears apart and smashes up the house, she finds the manuscript of his first novel; she reads it in one long sitting and decides that he is a genius. However, after another argument with his boss, she empties the shack and burns it down.

The two decamp to the outskirts of Paris and settle into a small hotel owned by Betty's friend Lisa. Betty laboriously types out Zorg's novel and submits it to several local publishers. They meet Lisa's new boyfriend, Eddy, and the four have many fun times, often fuelled by alcohol. Zorg and Betty find work at Eddy's pizzeria, but a fight erupts in which Betty stabs a demanding customer with a fork. Zorg tries to slap her back to her senses.

Though Zorg hides the rejection letters, Betty finds one and, going to the publisher's house, slashes his face. Zorg later persuades him to drop charges by threatening him with violence, saying that she is the only good thing in his life. Eddy's mother dies, and the friends attend the funeral in Marvejols. There, Eddy offers Zorg and Betty to live in the dead woman's house and run her piano shop. Zorg enjoys the quiet provincial life and befriends grocer Bob, his sex-starved wife Annie, and various offbeat locals, but Betty's violent mood swings are a concern. One evening, after an irritating comment from Zorg, she punches her bare hand through a glass window and goes on a screaming flight through the town.

Happiness seems on the horizon when a home test suggests that Betty is pregnant, but a laboratory test gives a negative result. She sinks into depression and tells Zorg that she is hearing voices talking to her in her head. Zorg, masquerading as a woman, robs an armoured cash collection van delivery headquarters, holding the guards at gunpoint and tying them up. He attempts to use the money to buy Betty's happiness, but she fails to respond and enacts yet another prosecutable offence by luring a small boy away from his mother and taking him to a toy store. Zorg finds her, and they both flee from the authorities as they rush to rescue the boy.

One day, Zorg comes home to find blood all over the place and Betty gone. Bob tells him she has gouged out an eye and is in the hospital. Rushing there, Zorg finds her under heavy sedation and is told to return the next day. Going home, he receives a phone call from a publisher accepting his manuscript. On his next visit to the hospital, he finds Betty restrained and catatonic. He becomes agitated, and a doctor tells him that she will need prolonged treatment and may never recover her sanity. Zorg blames her illness on the medication being administered and physically attacks the doctor. He is forcefully ejected from the hospital after a violent struggle with three orderlies. Returning in disguise that night, he whispers his farewells and smothers Betty with a pillow. At home, he sits down to continue his current novel, while conversing with his adopted cat, from whom he hears Betty's disembodied voice.

== Cast ==
- Jean-Hugues Anglade as Zorg
- Béatrice Dalle as Betty
- Gérard Darmon as Eddy
- Consuelo de Haviland as Lisa
- Clémentine Célarié as Annie
- Jacques Mathou as Bob
- Vincent Lindon as Richard, the young policeman
- Claude Aufaure as the doctor
- Louis Bellanti as Mario
- Dominique Besnehard as a customer in the pizzeria
- Raoul Billerey as the old policeman
- Philippe Laudenbach as the publisher
- Simon de La Brosse as the young guard (director's cut only)
- Dominique Pinon as the drug dealer (director's cut only)
- Jean-Pierre Bisson as the commissioner (director's cut only)

== Production ==
The film was shot in 1985 over 13 weeks in Gruissan, Marseille and Marvejols.

According to the director Jean-Jacques Beineix, the relationship between Jean-Hugues Anglade and Béatrice Dalle went far beyond a simple professional collaboration. "They were flirting all the time. It's clear that we didn't know if we were in the movie anymore. They lived an extraordinary story."

== Release ==
Betty Blue was distributed in the United Kingdom and the United States in November 1986 with English subtitles.

A 185-minute director's cut debuted in 2000 with the extra hour allowing Betty's descent into madness to take up more space and her pursuit of motherhood to get more screen time. Zorg's character is explored with several solo vignettes, including his cross-dressing crime spree.

Both the 185-minute director's cut and the original theatrical cut were released on Blu-ray in 2013 by Second Sight Films. The director's cut was added to The Criterion Collection on DVD and Blu-ray on 19 November 2019.

== Reception ==
Betty Blue received mostly positive reviews from critics. On the review aggregator website Rotten Tomatoes, the film holds an approval rating of 78% based on 27 reviews, with an average rating of 6.6/10. Metacritic, which uses a weighted average, assigned the film a score of 56 out of 100, based on 15 critics, indicating "mixed or average" reviews.

== See also ==
- List of submissions to the 59th Academy Awards for Best Foreign Language Film
- List of French submissions for the Academy Award for Best Foreign Language Film
- Cinéma du look
