= Keraudren =

Keraudren is a Breton surname. Notable people with this surname include:

- Edith Ker, born Édith Denise Keraudren (1910–1997), French actress
- Jean-Yves Keraudren, pseudonym of Théophile Jeusset (1910–1968), Breton nationalist
- Monique Keraudren (1928–1981), French botanist
- Pierre François Keraudren (1769–1858), French scientist and physician. Cape Keraudren and Keraudren Island in Western Australia are named after him.
