= Jean-Claude Dreyfus =

French actor, comedian, and author

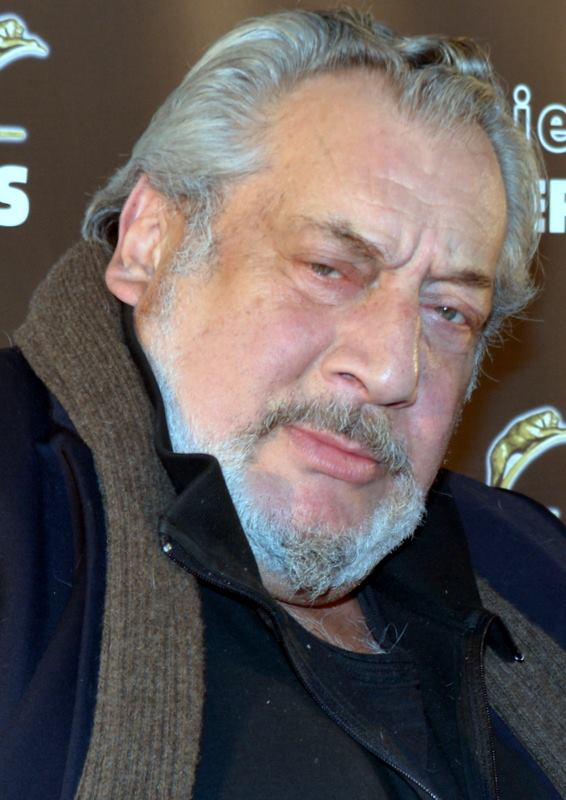
- Jean-Claude Dreyfus at the 2015 Lumière Awards
- Born: 18 February 1946 (age 80); Paris, France
- Occupation: Actor
- Years active: 1970–present

Jean-Claude Dreyfus (born 18 February 1946, in Paris) is a French actor.

He began his acting career in 1974 in the film Comment réussir quand on est con et pleurnichard. Dreyfus is notable for his portrayal of the butcher and main antagonist in the black comedy Delicatessen by Marc Caro and Jean-Pierre Jeunet. He collaborated again with Jeunet and actor Dominique Pinon in the films The City of Lost Children and A Very Long Engagement.

== Author ==
Year	Book	Publishing	Notes
2005	Du cochon considéré comme l'un des beaux-arts	Le Cherche-Midi	Novel
2006	Les questions à la con	Pascal Petiot	Novel
2012	Ma BioDégradable	Le Cherche-Midi	Novel

== Theater ==
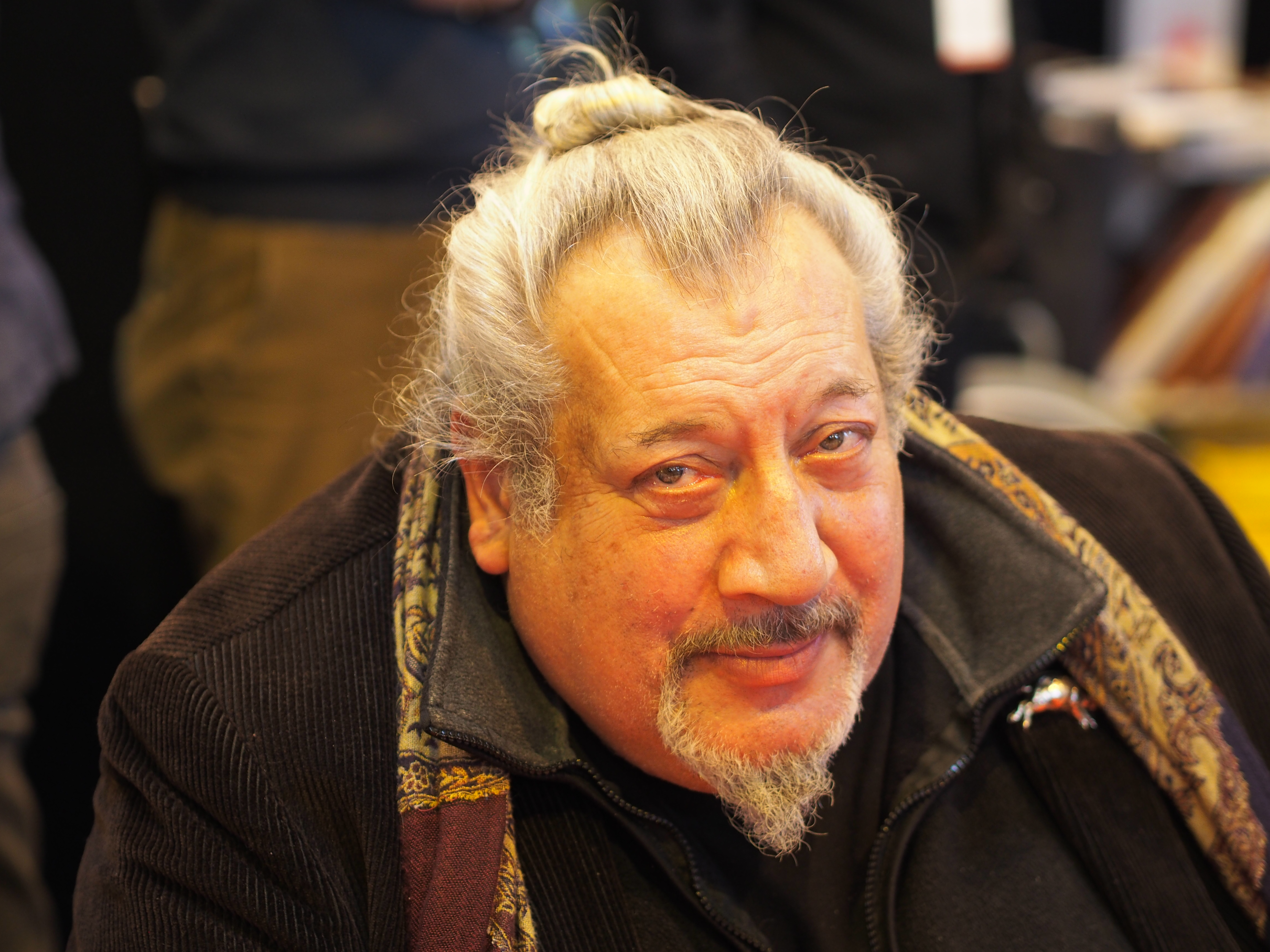
Jean-Claude Dreyfus at the Salon du livre de Paris in March 2013

Year	Title	Author	Director	Notes
1976	L'Échange	Paul Claudel	Anne Delbée	
1977	Nuova Colonia	Luigi Pirandello	Anne Delbée (2)	
1978	Les gens déraisonnables sont en voie de disparition	Peter Handke	Claude Régy	
1979	Les Fausses Confidences	Pierre de Marivaux	Jacques Lassalle	
1980	Un dimanche indécis dans la vie d'Anna	Jacques Lassalle	Jacques Lassalle (2)	
1981	Bent	Martin Sherman	Peter Chatel	
1983	Hôtel Jawat et de la Plage	Christine Albanel	André Oumansky	
1983	Lulu	Frank Wedekind	André Engel	
1985	The Misanthrope	Molière	André Engel (2)	
1986	Six Characters in Search of an Author	Luigi Pirandello	Jean-Pierre Vincent	
1986	As Is	William M. Hoffman	Gérard Vergez	
1988	Strange Interlude	Eugene O'Neill	Jacques Rosner	
1989	Ruy Blas	Victor Hugo	Jacques Rosner (2)	
1990	Le Chant du départ	Ivane Daoudi	Jean-Pierre Vincent (2)	
1990	La Nona	Roberto Cossa	Gérard Vergez	Nominated - Molière Award for Best Actor
1991	Ornifle ou le Courant d'air	Jean Anouilh	Patrice Leconte	
1997	Derrière les collines	Jean-Louis Bourdon	Jean-Louis Bourdon	
1998	Hygiene and the Assassin	Amélie Nothomb	Didier Long	Nominated - Molière Award for Best Actor
1998	Mother Courage and Her Children	Bertolt Brecht	Yves Pignot	
2005	Pour ceux qui restent	Pascal Elbé	Charles Berling	
2008	Réception	Serge Valletti	Christophe Correia	
2009-11	Le Mardi à Monoprix	Emmanuel Darley	Michel Didym	Nominated - Molière Award for Best Actor (2010); Nominated - Molière Award for Best Actor (2011)
2010	Périphéries Humaines	Euryale Collet-Barquero	Zmorda Chkimi	
2011-13	Dreyfus-Devos	Raymond Devos	Christophe Correia (2)	
2012	Viva la Vida	Pierre Tré-Hardy	Pierre Tré-Hardy	
2013	L'Inondation	Émile Zola		
2014	La Trahison d'Einstein	Éric-Emmanuel Schmitt	Steve Suissa	
2015	Le Chant des oliviers	Marilyne Bal	Anne Bouvier	

== Filmography ==
Year	Title	Role	Director	Notes
1970	Les aventures de Zadig		Claude-Jean Bonnardot	TV movie
1972	What a Flash!		Jean-Michel Barjol	
1974	Comment réussir quand on est con et pleurnichard	The transformist	Michel Audiard	
1975	One Man Against the Organization	Lady Rebecca Rosenbaum	Sergio Grieco	
1976	Shadow of Angels	Zwerg	Daniel Schmid	
1977	Le portrait de Dorian Gray	The preacher	Pierre Boutron	
1978	Le sucre	Mimine	Jacques Rouffio	
1978	Les folies Offenbach	Grand Duke Wladimir	Michel Boisrond	TV mini-series
1978	Nuova Colonia	Noccio	Patrick Bureau	
1979	Immoral Women	Bini	Walerian Borowczyk	
1979	Je te tiens, tu me tiens par la barbichette		Jean Yanne	
1979	Memoirs of a French Whore		Daniel Duval	
1979	Le journal	Noël	Philippe Lefebvre	TV mini-series
1980	L'embrumé	Rosen	Josée Dayan	TV movie
1981	Caméra une première	Bruno	Jean-François Delassus	TV series (1 episode)
1981	Allons z'enfants	Captain Maryla	Yves Boisset	
1982	Les dossiers de l'écran		Jean-François Delassus (2)	TV series (1 episode)
1982	Fitzcarraldo	Opera Singer	Werner Herzog	
1982	Le péril rampant	The Snake	Alberto Yaccelini	Short
1983	Le Prix du Danger	Bertrand	Yves Boisset (2)	
1983	Éducation anglaise	Georgina	Jean-Claude Roy	
1983	Le Marginal	The transvestite	Jacques Deray	
1984	Rue barbare		Gilles Béhat	
1984	Dog Day	Le Barrec	Yves Boisset (3)	
1984	Le rat		Elisabeth Huppert	TV movie
1984	Le fou du roi	Courtemise	Yvan Chiffre	
1984	Our Story	A neighbor	Bertrand Blier	
1984	Cheech & Chong's The Corsican Brothers	Marquis Du Hickey	Tommy Chong	
1984	Liste noire	Mahler	Alain Bonnot	
1987	Tandem	Adviser	Patrice Leconte	
1987	La vieille quimboiseuse et le majordome	The transvestite	Julius Amédé Laou	
1987	Comment Wang-Fo fut sauvé	The Emperor	René Laloux	Short
1988	Ville étrangère	Taxi driver	Didier Goldschmidt	
1988	Black mic-mac 2	The Commissioner	Marco Pauly	
1988	Méliès 88		Philippe Gautier	TV Short
1988	Le clan	Lamberti	Claude Barma	TV mini-series
1988	La bête féroce		Magali Cerda	Short
1989	Radio Corbeau	Rosati	Yves Boisset (4)	
1989	Lundi noir	Thierache	Jean-François Delassus (3)	TV movie
1989	Jeanne d'Arc, le pouvoir de l'innocence	Jean de Luxembourg	Pierre Badel	TV movie
1989	Tour d'ivoire		Dominique Belet	Short
1990	There Were Days... and Moons	The accident's man	Claude Lelouch	
1991	La tribu	The alcoholic	Yves Boisset (5)	
1991	Delicatessen	Clapet	Marc Caro & Jean-Pierre Jeunet	Nominated - César Award for Best Supporting Actor
1991	Commissaire Chabert: Le tueur du zodiaque	Abelar	Bernard Villiot	TV movie
1991	Tous les Matins du Monde	Abbe Mathieu	Alain Corneau	
1991	25 décembre 58, 10h36		Diane Bertrand	Short
1992	The Voice	Head waiter	Pierre Granier-Deferre	
1992	Poulets à l'amende	Leguern	Stéphane Kurc	TV movie
1992	La Belle Histoire	The Inspector	Claude Lelouch (2)	
1992	Princesse Alexandra	Worth	Denis Amar	TV movie
1992	Coyote	M. Poireau	Richard Ciupka	
1992	Un vampire au paradis	The fake psychiatrist	Abdelkrim Bahloul	
1992	Jo et Milou	Simon	Josée Dayan (2)	TV movie
1992	La Fille de l'air	Marcel	Maroun Bagdadi	
1992	L'affaire Salengro	Roger Salengro	Denys de La Patellière	TV movie
1992	Article 22		Gilles Romera	Short
1993	Les histoires d'amour finissent mal... en général	Dennard	Anne Fontaine	
1993	Pétain	Dumoulin	Jean Marboeuf	
1993	Le bourgeois gentilhomme	The philosophy teacher	Yves-André Hubert	TV movie
1993	Télé-carton		Gil Lefauconnier & Isabelle Salvini	Short
1993	Piège à sons		Philippe Dorison	Short
1993	Les portes	M. Levski	Fabrice Nordmann	Short
1993	Deux cafés, l'addition		Gilles Pujol	Short
1994	Bonsoir	Inspector Bruneau	Jean-Pierre Mocky	
1994	Cache Cash	Max	Claude Pinoteau	
1994	Passé sous silence	Charles Hutin	Igaal Niddam	TV movie
1994	Toilettes		Olias Barco	Short
1994	Lonelytude ou une légère éclaircie		Éric Guirado	Short
1994	Le terminus de Rita		Filip Forgeau	Short
1994	Le concert		Stéphane Krausz	Short
1995	Nestor Burma	Charles Baurenot	Jean Marboeuf (2)	TV series (1 episode)
1995	En mai, fais ce qu'il te plaît	Daniel	Pierre Grange	
1995	Le Fils de Gascogne	Marco Garciano	Pascal Aubier	
1995	The City of Lost Children	Marcello	Marc Caro & Jean-Pierre Jeunet (2)	
1995	Krim	The transvestite	Ahmed Bouchaala	
1995	Oui	The guard	Pascal Perennes	Short
1995	Le courrier des îles		Alain Marie	Short
1995	La main		Samuel Dupuy	Short
1995	Crash record		Dominique Champetier	Short
1996	Une trop bruyante solitude	Chief	Véra Caïs	
1996	Le réveil	The Man	Marc-Henri Wajnberg	Short
1996	The Adventures of Pinocchio	Foreman	Steve Barron	
1996	Tiré à part	Georges Récamier	Bernard Rapp	
1997	La cible	The prefect	Pierre Courrège	
1997	Mira la magnifique	Zaoul	Agnès Delarive	TV movie
1997	La ballade de Titus	Doctor Shrink	Vincent De Brus	
1997	Le nègre	Jean Jeudi	François Lévy-Kuentz	Short
1997	Le milliardaire		Julien Eudes	Short
1997	Enquête d'audience	The attendant	Laurent Pellicer	Short
1998	Pension des oiseaux		Dominique Champetier (2)	Short
1998	Les tartines	The woodcutter	Fabrice Radenac	Short
1998	L'homme sans faim	M. Tortionari	Mathieu Zeitindjioglou	Short
1998	Jean-Michel	The neighbor	Alexandre Zanetti	Short
1999	H	Cyril Strauss	Charles Nemes	TV series (1 episode)
1999	Un peu de retenue!		Sylvain Gillet	Short
1999	Un Noël de chien		Nadine Monfils	Short
2000	Les enfants du printemps	Serge	Marco Pico	TV mini-series
2000	Proposition de manger les enfants	The ogre	Brice Reveney	Short
2001	The Lady and the Duke	The Duke of Orleans	Éric Rohmer	
2001	Philosophale		Farid Fedjer	
2002	Sumoto Life	The first thug	Jean Pillet	Short
2002	Il était une 'foi'		Nathalie Aussant	Short
2002	Maigret	Xavier Bresselles	Yves de Chalonge	TV series (1 episode)
2002	Au loin... l'horizon		Olivier Vidal	
2003	Dernière cigarette	The angry man	Thierry Falivene	Short
2003	Rien, voilà l'ordre	The libertine	Jacques Baratier	
2003	Lovely Rita, sainte patronne des cas désespérés	The antique dealer	Stéphane Clavier	
2003	La peau de chagrin	Narrator	Stéphane Blanquet & Olive	Short
2004	Le cercle vicieux		Nicolas Leblanc	Short
2004	Fragile	The Boss	Nicolas Bary	Short
2004	3 garçons, 1 fille, 2 mariages	Camille's father	Stéphane Clavier (2)	TV movie
2004	Two Brothers	Administrator Eugene Normandin	Jean-Jacques Annaud	
2004	Le p'tit curieux	Monsieur Dubois	Jean Marboeuf (3)	
2004	Petits mythes urbains	Peter	Igor Legarreta & Emilio Pérez Pérez	TV series (1 episode)
2004	Automne	Hugo	Ra'up McGee	
2004	A Very Long Engagement	Major François Lavrouye	Jean-Pierre Jeunet (3)	
2004	Mauvaise graine	Orak	Stéphane Blanquet & Olive (2)	Short
2005	À l'état d'e(m)bauche	The director	Bernard Tanguy	Short
2005	Le juge est une femme	Jacques Villeroy	Jean-Marc Seban	TV series (1 episode)
2005	Zooloo	Juan	Nicolas Bazz	Short
2006	Les soliloques du pauvre		Laurent Preyale	
2006	Le bénévole	Doctor Museau	Jean-Pierre Mocky (2)	
2006	Au crépuscule des temps	Giuseppe Mariani	Sarah Lévy	TV movie
2007	Monsieur Max	Sacha Guitry	Gabriel Aghion	TV movie
2007	Le deal	Hervé Radius	Jean-Pierre Mocky (3)	
2007	Jean de La Fontaine - Le défi	M. de Chateauneuf	Daniel Vigne	
2007	Chacun son cinéma	The husband	Roman Polanski	
2007	Situation critique	Mr. Schmob	Guillaume Le Mezo & Boris Vassallo	Short
2007	Tierce mineure	Musician	Olivier Vidal (2)	Short
2007	Les cerfs-volants	The count	Jérôme Cornuau	TV movie
2008	Vincent, le magnifique	Pierre	Pascal Forney	Short
2008	Le prince de ce monde	Debruges	Manuel Gómez	
2008	Coco Chanel	Paul Poiret	Christian Duguay	TV movie
2008	Des astres		Benjamin Carniaux & Frédéric Ruiz	Short
2008	Vilaine	Narrator	Jean-Patrick Benes & Allan Mauduit	
2009	L'affaire Salengro	Henri Béraud	Yves Boisset (6)	TV movie
2009	S.A.R.L. Noël		Anita & John Hudson	Short
2009	Une nuit qu'il était à se morfondre...	Jean-Claude	Cyril Paris	Short
2009	Les Ames Pixellisées	Armand	Michael Castellanet	Short
2010	Malena	Marie-Pierre	Pierre Noguéras	Short
2010	La vieille dame et le garçon	Philippe	Gaël Cottat	Short
2010	Dernier voyage improvisé	Raoul	Julien Guiol	Short
2010	6-7 et nous	Mr. Le Maire	Alain Aubrion & Nicolas Gauffreteau	Short
2011	Un crime hors de prix	Henri	Quentin Lestienne	Short
2011	Requiem pour une tueuse	The singing master	Jérôme Le Gris	
2011	L'orpheline avec en plus un bras en moins	Renaud Duraquet	Jacques Richard	
2011	Mama Lova		Thomas Szczepanski	
2011	Bartleby	Turkey	Olivier Martinez	Short
2012	L'art des Thanatier	Voice	David Le Bozec	Short
2013	La belle et le vertige	Mr. Backer	Maxime Hermet	Short
2013	Attila Marcel	M. Kruzinsky	Sylvain Chomet	
2014	Sur l'océane	The producer	Enola S. Cluzeau	
2014	Déconnexion	Dog Seller	Jérémie Prigent & François Rémond	Short
2014	Sauliac	Sauliac	Edouard Giraudo	Short
2015	Dom Juan, Acte IV, Scène 3	M. Dimanche	Tom Dahio	Short
2015	Sélection officielle	Michel Rivière	Jacques Richard (2)	
