= Things I Like, Things I Don't Like =

- Title card
- French: Foutaises
- Directed by: Jean-Pierre Jeunet
- Written by: Bruno Delbonnel; Jean-Pierre Jeunet
- Produced by: Zootrope, in association with Claudie Ossard
- Starring: Dominique Pinon; Marie-Laure Dougnac
- Cinematography: Jean Poisson
- Edited by: Jean-Pierre Jeunet
- Music by: Carlos d'Alessio
- Release date: 1 January 1989 (UK)
- Running time: 8 minutes
- Country: France
- Language: French

Things I Like, Things I Don't Like (French: Foutaises) is a 1989 French short film directed by Jean-Pierre Jeunet. It won the César Award for Best Fiction Short Film in 1991.

== Plot ==
Dominique Pinon talks to the camera describing his likes and dislikes, ranging from the simple such as "I hate men with a beard but no moustache" to the more touching, "I like to think that after death can't be worse than before birth." Each of his examples is accompanied by a visual demonstration.

The actress Marie-Laure Dougnac (Pinon's collaborator in Delicatessen), also makes a cameo appearance. Jean-Pierre Jeunet reused this technique in his 2001 film Amélie when introducing the characters.

== Cast ==
- Dominique Pinon: The Man
- Chick Ortega
- Marie-Laure Dougnac
- Diane Bertrand
- Fabienne Chaudat
