= Dante 01 =

- Directed by: Marc Caro
- Written by: Marc Caro; Pierre Bordage
- Produced by: Richard Grandpierre
- Starring: Lambert Wilson; Linh Dan Pham; Simona Maicanescu; Dominique Pinon
- Cinematography: Jean Poisson
- Edited by: Linda Attab; Sébastien Prangère
- Music by: Raphaël Elig; Eric Wenger
- Release date: 2 January 2008
- Running time: 82 minutes
- Country: France
- Language: French
- Budget: $7.3 million
- Box office: $347,000

Dante 01 is a 2008 science fiction film by French director Marc Caro.

The film is set in a space station which orbits a fiery planet named after Dante. The station hosts a psychiatric asylum and detention center. The patients are criminals who have volunteered as test subjects in human experimentation. The sole survivor of a shipwreck is placed with the other patients, but he soon demonstrates abilities as a healer and starts being viewed as a miracle worker.

== Plot ==
Deep in space, above a fiery planet named Dante, orbits the space station called "Dante 01". It hosts a psychiatric detention center that hosts six prisoners whose crimes were so severe that they volunteered to live under experimentation. The center is run by a man named Charon, with the assistance of psychiatrist Dr. Perséphone and two security guards called CR and BR.

One day, a Neurinos shuttle arrives with a new scientist named Elisa, carrying a new prisoner of unknown origins who was found as the sole survivor in a shipwreck and wakes up from hypersleep severely disoriented and unable to speak. He is introduced to the other inmates: their leader César; his right-hand man Lazare, who developed the ability to hold his breath to escape the gas with which the prisoners are sedated; the large and violent Moloch, who is César's enforcer; the reclusive Bouddha, who has the habit of trying to murder whoever is in pain out of misguided compassion; the deranged anarchist hacker Attila; and Raspoutine, a deeply religious man who claims the new one was sent by God to save them, and starts calling him "Saint-Georges, the Dragonslayer", because of a tattoo on his arm.

Elisa and Perséphone are at odds over their research methods, since the latter advocates a humanist approach to the prisoners' mental issues, while Elisa has been sent there to experiment with a new nanotechnology that directly modifies the patient's DNA, eliminating the genetic component of their antisocial behaviors. Charon asks Attila to hack into Elisa's files to discover the extent of her orders. Much to his horror, Attila finds out she is authorized to kill them all for the sake of her research.

As expected, Bouddha attempts to strangle Saint-Georges in order to alleviate his suffering. This leads to infighting amongst the prisoners, so they get gassed, and Bouddha becomes Elisa's first subject. She injects him with nanites and returns him to the prison hold. Bouddha is immediately wracked by unbearable pain from the nanites bonding with his DNA, but Saint-Georges is able to remove them from him (from his point of view, he's removing some kind of energy creature from Bouddha and eating it). Bouddha becomes well again and as convinced as Raspoutine that Saint-Georges is a miracle worker, befriending him. Later, Moloch attacks Saint-Georges, but Raspoutine intervenes, causing Moloch to accidentally slit his own throat with the shiv he was holding. Gas pours in to knock the group out again, but not before Saint-Georges had run over to assist Moloch. The prison guards rush in only to discover, to their amazement, that Moloch has no wound on his throat, and is alive and well. On their way out, they inject César with the nanites.

Perséphone's assumption that Saint-Georges is a miracle worker is scoffed at by Elisa, but Moloch's own doubts prompt an increasingly debilitated César to fear an impending usurping of his authority, so he commands Lazare and Moloch to kill Saint-Georges. While Bouddha and Raspoutine are distracted, Saint-Georges is stabbed to death by Lazare. However, while the staff is examining his corpse, Saint-Georges wakes up completely healed, grabs Elisa and uses her as a hostage to reach the prison quarters before releasing her.

César suffers severe pain from the nanites, but Saint-Georges cures him as well. Attila appears and tells the others of his plans to destroy them all out of spite, by making the space station crash into the planet, triggering the rage of the other prisoners. Attila manages to run away, only to be found later in a shaft, having hanged himself.

With Attila dead, the only way to save the station is to activate the manual override located under a trapdoor below the prisoner's quarters. The prisoners agree to let the staff through, but Elisa refuses to accompany the others inside the prisoner area. As all the station inhabitants work together to open the hatch, the gas goes off, knocking everyone but Lazare out.

Elisa prepares to escape via shuttle, but Lazare ambushes her, forcing her to let him in the shuttle as well. As the others awaken, one of the guards finds out about Elisa's betrayal, but also that Attila had messed with the shuttle controls as well, resulting in the shuttle burning through the planet's atmosphere. After having finally opened the hatch, the group finds the cooling system overheated so now the corridor that leads to the manual controls is filled with boiling coolant. César realizes he is the only one slight enough to fit into the little space, and volunteers to descend, wrapped in some protective fabrics. He emerges on the other side horribly burned and dies in the compartment before being able to enter the code necessary to reset the controls.

In the epilogue, Saint-Georges emerges from the station in a space suit and float above the planet, using the full extent of his inexplicable powers and the mysterious energy creatures that now reside inside him to terraform Dante into a livable planet, while his body disintegrates in space as a result of the transformation.

== Cast ==
- Lambert Wilson as Saint-Georges
- Linh Dan Pham as Elisa
- Simona Maicanescu as Perséphone
- Dominique Pinon as César
- Bruno Lochet as Bouddha
- François Levantal as Lazare
- Gérald Laroche as Charon
- François Hadji-Lazaro as Moloch
- Lotfi Yahya-Jedidi as Raspoutine
- Yann Collette as Attila

== Critical reception ==
Variety critic Lisa Nesselson praised the film as a "throbbing, disturbing fairy tale" and pointed to Caro's "breathtaking dark style", which the director had already demonstrated in Delicatessen and The City of Lost Children together with his close friend and collaborator Jean-Pierre Jeunet. Nesselson also praised lead actor Lambert Wilson who delivers a committed, almost wordless performance and is "fabulously muscular and expressive".

The Swiss daily newspaper Le Temps criticized Dante 01 for being directed "without talent". As well as stating that Caro's first directorial work in twelve years had "astonishingly stupid" dialogue, "cumbersome symbolism", no humor and seemed significantly longer than two hours.

Critic Eberhard von Elterlein from the German daily newspaper Die Welt made a critical review stating: "A symbol-laden sci-fi fairy tale with an 'Alien' look and a '2001' attitude by Marc Caro which only quotes its way through film and intellectual history in a heavy-blooded way - with gaps as big as black holes."

== See also ==
- List of films featuring space stations
