= Violette (2026 film) =

French film

- French: Changer l'eau des fleurs
- Directed by: Jean-Pierre Jeunet
- Screenplay by: Jean-Pierre Jeunet; Guillaume Laurant
- Based on: Changer l'eau des fleurs by Valérie Perrin
- Starring: Leïla Bekhti
- Cinematography: Thomas Hardmeier
- Edited by: Hervé Schneid
- Music by: Saycet
- Production companies: 2425 Films; Palomar; StudioCanal
- Distributed by: StudioCanal (France)
- Release date: 9 December 2026 (France)
- Countries: France; Italy
- Language: French

Violette (French: Changer l'eau des fleurs) is an upcoming film directed by Jean-Pierre Jeunet. The film is an adaptation of Valérie Perrin's 2018 novel Changer l'eau des fleurs. The film explores the life of Violette Toussaint, a caretaker of a cemetery in a small town in Burgundy. The film will be released in 2026.

== Cast ==
- Leïla Bekhti as Violette Toussaint
- Matthias Schoenaerts
- Melvil Poupaud
- Anouk Grinberg
- Sergio Castellitto
- Alban Lenoir
- Elodie Batard Gaultier

== Production ==
Principal photography began on 5 May 2025 in Saône-et-Loire. A significant portion of the film was shot in Autun, especially at the cemetery on Rue de la Maladière in Autun, which was transformed with fake tombstones. Other locations in Autun were also used, including the Temple of Janus, the bus station, and the city hall. Outside of Autun, the Café du Nord in Arnay-le-Duc and a garage in Chagny were scheduled to be used. Filming in Autun continued until 20 June. Scenes were also shot in Rozerotte, in the Vosges department, for two weeks from mid-June until early July. Filming continued at the end of July in Sainte-Geneviève-des-Bois, just south of Paris. After a break, filming was scheduled to resume from 8 to 21 September in Cassis or Marseille, in the south of France. Filming was scheduled to last for a total of 13 weeks.

== Release ==
The film is scheduled to be released in France by StudioCanal on 9 December 2026. In November 2026, Sony Pictures Classics acquired distribution rights to the film in the United States, Latin America, and Southeast Asia.

It will be presented in the Grand public section of the 21st Rome Film Festival in October 2026.
