= Carlos d'Alessio =

Argentina-born French composer

- Born: 1935; Buenos Aires, Argentina
- Died: June 14, 1992 Paris, France
- Occupation: Composer
- Years active: 1974 – 1992

Carlos d'Alessio (1935 – June 14, 1992) was an Argentina-born French composer.

== Life ==
Carlos d'Alessio was born in Buenos Aires. He studied architecture and is interested in cinema and learn music. In 1962, he moved to New York and was introduced in the middle of the vanguard. In 1973, he drew the attention of the novelist Marguerite Duras, and became a filmmaker. The two then worked together several times.

He died on June 14, 1992, in Paris.

== Scores ==
Year	Title	Director	Notes
1974	La Femme du Gange	Marguerite Duras	first collaboration with Duras
1975	Maîtresse	Barbet Schroeder	
1975	India Song	Marguerite Duras (2)	Nominated - César Award for Best Music Written for a Film
1976	Les Lieux de Marguerite Duras	Michelle Porte	
1976	Son nom de Venise dans Calcutta désert	Marguerite Duras (3)	
1976	Des journées entières dans les arbres	Marguerite Duras (4)	
1977	Baxter, Vera Baxter	Marguerite Duras (5)	
1979	Le navire Night	Marguerite Duras (6)	
1981	Les jeux de la Comtesse Dolingen de Gratz	Catherine Binet	
1982	Parti sans laisser d'adresse	Jacqueline Veuve	
1982	Hécate	Daniel Schmid	
1985	The Children	Marguerite Duras (7)	
1988	La bête dans la jungle	Benoît Jacquot	TV movie
1989	Things I Like, Things I Don't Like (Foutaises)	Jean-Pierre Jeunet	Short
1991	Delicatessen	Marc Caro; Jean-Pierre Jeunet (2)	Sitges Film Festival - Best Original Soundtrack; Nominated - César Award for Best Music Written for a Film
1992	Frauen über R. W. Fassbinder	Thomas Honickel	TV movie documentary
