= Micmacs (film) =

2009 comedy film

- French release poster
- Directed by: Jean-Pierre Jeunet
- Written by: Jean-Pierre Jeunet; Guillaume Laurent
- Produced by: Frédéric Brillion; Gilles Legrand; Jean-Pierre Jeunet
- Starring: Dany Boon
- Cinematography: Tetsuo Nagata
- Edited by: Hervé Schneid
- Music by: Raphaël Beau; Max Steiner
- Production companies: Epithéte Films; Tapioca Films; Warner Bros. Entertainment France; France 2 Cinéma; France 3 Cinéma
- Distributed by: Warner Bros. Pictures
- Release dates: 15 September 2009 (Toronto); 28 October 2009 (France)
- Running time: 105 minutes
- Country: France
- Language: French
- Budget: €23.8 million
- Box office: $16.7 million

Micmacs is a 2009 French comedy film by French director Jean-Pierre Jeunet. Its original French title is MicMacs à tire-larigot (loosely "Non-stop shenanigans"). The film is billed as a "satire on the world arms trade." It premiered on 15 September 2009 at the 2009 Toronto International Film Festival as a gala screening at Roy Thomson Hall.

== Plot ==
A young boy named Bazil loses his military father, who is blown up while attempting to defuse a land mine in the Western Sahara. Thirty years later, Bazil is working in a video rental shop in Paris when he is shot in the head by a stray bullet. Doctors save his life but decide against removing the bullet. Now unemployed, Bazil becomes a homeless busker until he is taken in by a man named Slammer to Tire-Larigots, a shelter carved under a mountain of scrap material. Bazil is befriended by the other scavenging dwellers: Elastic Girl, Mama Chow, Remington, Buster, Tiny Pete and Calculator.

While scavenging for trash, Bazil discovers the offices and factories of the firms that manufactured the landmine that killed his father and the bullet he was shot with, on opposite sides of a street. He enters the latter to ask for compensation but is thrown out on the orders of CEO Nicolas Thibault de Fenouillet. He then infiltrates the other company and hears a speech by its CEO, François Marconi. Bazil follows Marconi home where he overhears a phone conversation arranging a meeting between Marconi and associates of Omar Boulounga, an African dictator seeking arms for an upcoming violent conflict. The crew decides to help Bazil exact revenge on the two arms dealers.

The team eliminate Boulounga's men by planting drugs on them at the airport. Remington, claiming to be Boulounga's right-hand man, meets with De Fenouillet and proposes the same deal which was offered to Marconi. Later, Remington calls each of Marconi and De Fennouillet and angrily cancels the deal. He tells Marconi that he will be dealing with De Fennouillet, and tells De Fennouillet that he will be dealing with Marconi. Furious, the two CEOs go to war with each other. Bazil and his friends break into Marconi's house and steal and replace his luxury cars, and steal De Fenouillet's collection of body-part relics from historical persons. They also steal and destroy a truck full of bombs from Marconi's plant. Marconi assumes that De Fennouillet is responsible, and arranges to sabotage a machine causing a massive explosion in De Fennouillet's factory.

Elastic Girl breaks into Marconi's apartment to search for blackmail material while Bazil waits on the roof. Marconi arrives unexpectedly, and Elastic Girl is forced to hide in the refrigerator. De Fenouillet sends an armed team to attack Marconi, but Boulounga's men arrive first and take him hostage. Boulounga's men are about to execute Marconi when they are shot by De Fennouillet's men. De Fenouillet is, in turn, about to murder Marconi when a henchman captures Bazil on the roof and brings him down. The two executives recognise him and figure out what has happened. They decide to take Bazil to a safe house in order to question him. Elastic Girl calls in the rest of the crew to rescue Bazil. After a car chase through Paris, Bazil is saved and Marconi and De Fennouillet are captured.

The two CEOs are bound and hooded, and they hear a long plane flight followed by a ride in a car. They are unhooded in the middle of a desert with De Fennouillet sitting on Marconi's shoulders. A live grenade is inserted into De Fennouillet's mouth, while Marconi is made to stand on a live land mine. A small crowd wearing desert outfits sit watching them, holding photographs of landmine victims. The men beg for mercy and confess to supplying arms to the IRA, ETA, and Darfur combatants. Marconi and De Fenouillet fall and discover that the grenade and mine are not armed. The small audience is revealed to be Bazil and his friends in disguise, who have been recording the event with a video camera. It is revealed that Bazil and his friends simulated the entire plane flight with various sound effects, and the desert setting is simply a clearing in a Paris suburb. Bazil uploads their video to YouTube, and Marconi and De Fenouillet are publicly disgraced. Bazil and Elastic Girl become a couple.

== Cast ==
- Dany Boon as Bazil
- Yolande Moreau as Mama Chow
- André Dussollier as Nicolas Thibault De Fenouillet
- Nicolas Marié as François Marconi
- Julie Ferrier as Elastic Girl
- Omar Sy as Remington
- Doudou Masta as L'émissarie africain
- Jean-Pierre Becker as Libarski
- Dominique Pinon as Buster / Louison (Delicatessen character cameo)
- Marie-Julie Baup as Calculator
- Michel Crémadès as Tiny Pete
- Jean-Pierre Marielle as Slammer
- Urbain Cancelier as the night guard
- Marie-Laure Dougnac as Julie Clapet (Delicatessen character cameo)

== Production ==
=== Development ===
Jean-Pierre Jeunet originally wrote the character of Bazil for Jamel Debbouze, but Debbouze left the project after three weeks, citing artistic and financial disagreements. The role was later given to Dany Boon.

Jeunet toured arms manufacturing plants in Belgium for research when developing the film. Some dialogue was taken directly from interviews from arms dealers. The sabotaged machine in De Fenouillet's factory was modeled exactly after an actual machine in a plant which Jeunet visited.

=== Filming ===
The film was shot in several locations in and around Paris including the exterior of the Musée d'Orsay and the Crimée bridge on the Canal de l'Ourcq, where the Marcel Carné's 1946 film Gates of the Night was shot. Jeunet also filmed in several train stations, including Gare de Lyon, Gare Saint-Lazare, and the Charles De Gaulle airport train station.

The scene with the two CEOs in the desert was inspired by Sergio Leone's Once Upon a Time in the West. The subsequent flashback sequence was inspired by Brian De Palma's Mission: Impossible.

=== Effects ===
Though the film contains no obvious special effects sequences, digital color manipulation is used throughout, and specific digital manipulations were used on about 350 shots. These manipulations often involved removing people and objects in backgrounds of scenes shot on Paris streets. The closeup of Dany Boon's face during Marconi's speech was out of focus when shot, but his performance was so good that Jeunet decided to digitally focus the face rather than reshooting. De Fenouillet's first appearance in his office was constructed entirely in post-production from footage filmed for a different scene. Bazil, Buster, and Slammer were digitally removed from the frame, and De Fenouillet was given dialogue whose audio would synchronize exactly with the original lines filmed.

The character of Elastic Girl performs several contortions on screen which were not digital effects. Julie Ferrier, who played the character, is fairly flexible and did some of the movement herself. The difficult contortions were performed by Julia Gunthel, also known as Zlata. Jeunet and cinematographer Tetsuo Nagata had discovered Gunthel doing an erotic show in Germany.

Tiny Pete's moving sculptures were designed and built by sculptor Gilbert Peyre.

The film contains five appearances of the film's poster, usually hidden in quick shots.

=== Music ===
The film opens with the final sequence of The Big Sleep, with the original score by Max Steiner. Steiner's score is used throughout the film, but Jeunet also required original music. The music which appears is by Raphaël Beau, a school teacher with no prior professional recording or scoring experience. Beau composed music cues for various scenes. Jeunet loved his music but moved the songs to different scenes in the final version of the film.

=== Planned scene ===
Jeunet also decided to reference his earlier film Amélie in the shot when Bazil first lowers his microphone into a chimney. The planned scene would show Amélie and Nino in a small apartment with several crying children. Amélie star Audrey Tautou was shooting Coco Before Chanel and was unavailable to shoot the scene. The shot was replaced by an homage to Jeunet's Delicatessen. In the final scene, Dominique Pinon sits with Marie-Laure Dougnac and plays a musical saw.

== Reception ==
According to Box Office Mojo, Micmacs grossed $16,331,174 in the worldwide box office. On the review aggregator website Rotten Tomatoes, 71% of 143 critics' reviews are positive. The website's consensus reads: "It might be a little too whimsical for its own good, but Micmacs delivers more of the inventive silliness that director Jean-Pierre Jeunet is known for." Metacritic gave the film a score of 62 out of 100, based on 31 critics.
