= Rufus (actor) =

French actor (born 1942)

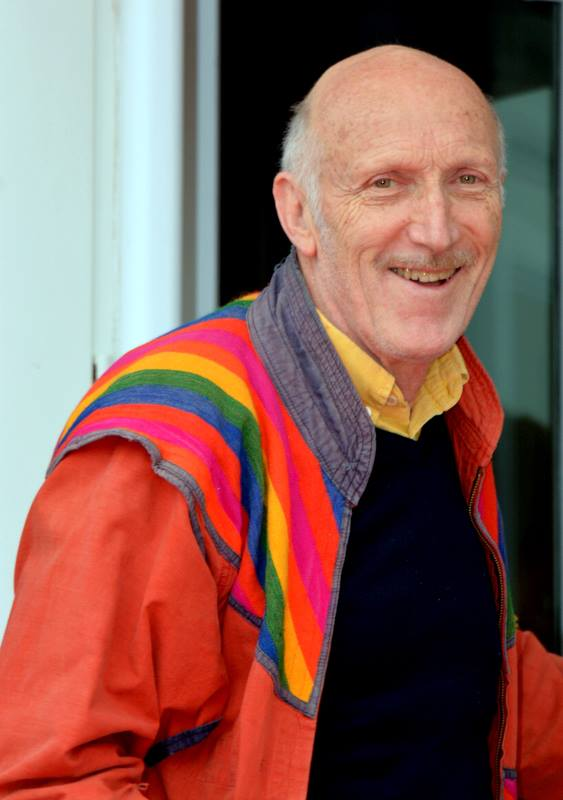
- Rufus in 2016
- Born: Jacques Narcy; 19 December 1942 (age 83); Riom, Puy-de-Dôme, France
- Occupation: Actor
- Years active: 1967–present
- Children: 3

Jacques Narcy (born 19 December 1942), better known by his stage name Rufus, is a French actor best known to international film audiences for his performance as Raphaël, the father of Amélie Poulain in Amélie (2001).

== Career ==
After three years at medical school, he became a theatre manager.

He has appeared in numerous French TV series and productions, including most of the films directed by Jean-Pierre Jeunet. He played the lead role in the movie Train de vie (1998), an award-winning tragicomedy about the Holocaust.

== Personal life ==
He lives in Neauphle-le-Château in the Yvelines département and has three children; his daughter Zoé Narcy and his son Basile Narcy are themselves actors.

== Filmography ==
Year	Title	Role	Director	Notes
1967	Les encerclé		Christian Gion	
1969	Mr. Freedom	Freddie Fric	William Klein	
1969	Erotissimo	The Accountant	Gérard Pirès	
1969	Les patates	Larobesse	Claude Autant-Lara	
1969	L'américain	Corbeau	Marcel Bozzuffi	
1969	Week-end surprise		Georges Dumoulin	Short
1969	La montre		Peter Kassovitz	Short
1969	Léonce et Léna	Valerio	Guy Lessertisseur	TV movie
1969	Laure	Ferdinand	Moshé Mizrahi	TV series
1970	Cran d'arrêt	The photographer's assistant	Yves Boisset	
1970	The Cop	Raymond Aulnay	Yves Boisset (2)	
1970	Promise at Dawn	The Violin Teacher	Jules Dassin	
1970	Donkey Skin		Jacques Demy	
1970	Les saintes chéries	Sautarel	Jean Becker	TV series (3 episodes)
1970	Rendez-vous à Badenberg	ZZ 22	Jean-Michel Meurice	TV series (10 episodes)
1970	The Wedding Ring	The pigeons's breeder	Christian de Chalonge	
1971	Fantasia Among the Squares	Wesson	Gérard Pirès (2)	
1971	L'amour c'est gai, l'amour c'est triste		Jean-Daniel Pollet	
1971	Laisse aller... c'est une valse	Mister Ferglough	Georges Lautner	
1971	Un aller simple	Tom Mills	José Giovanni	
1971	Valparaiso, Valparaiso	The Vilain	Pascal Aubier	
1971	Aussi loin que l'amour	The Barman	Frédéric Rossif	
1971	Où est passé Tom?	Tom Coupar	José Giovanni (2)	
1972	Les camisards	Jacques Combassous	René Allio	
1973	La vie facile	The Priest	Francis Warin	
1973	The Edifying and Joyous Story of Colinot	Gagnepain	Nina Companeez	
1973	L'école sauvage		Costa Natsis & Adam Pianko	
1973	Une belle journée		Jean-Charles Tacchella	Short
1973	Poof	Poof	Lazare Iglesis	TV movie
1974	Un nuage entre les dents	The Dog's man	Marco Pico	
1974	Mariage	Henri Thierry	Claude Lelouch	
1974	Nouvelles de Henry James	Monsieur Pemberton	Luc Béraud	TV series (1 episode)
1975	Au long de rivière Fango	Jérémie	Sotha	
1975	Lily, aime-moi	Claude	Maurice Dugowson	
1975	Trop c'est trop	The Policeman	Didier Kaminka	
1975	Le chant du départ	Michel	Pascal Aubier (2)	
1975	La adúltera	Lucien	Roberto Bodegas	
1976	The Tenant	Georges Badar	Roman Polanski	
1976	Un type comme moi ne devrait jamais mourir	Packages's Man	Michel Vianey	
1976	Jonah Who Will Be 25 in the Year 2000	Mathieu Vernier	Alain Tanner	
1977	March or Die	Sergeant Triand	Dick Richards	
1977	Je veux mourir dans la patrie de Jean-Paul Sartre		Mosco Boucault	Short
1977	Aller-retour	The Man	Monique Enckell	Short
1977	Cinéma 16	Bibi	Jacques Krier	TV series (1 episode)
1978	Fire's Share	Patrick Delbaut	Étienne Périer	
1978	Surprise Sock	Antoine	Jean-François Davy	
1979	Ville à prendre	Voice	Patrick Brunie	
1979	Zoo zéro	Yves	Alain Fleischer	
1979	The Police War	Le Garrec	Robin Davis	
1980	San Francisco		Freddy Charles	TV movie
1981	La chanson du mal aimé	Guillaume Apollinaire	Claude Weisz	
1981	Une pierre, un arbre, un nuage		Christine van de Putte	Short
1982	Xueiv		Patrick Brunie (2)	
1982	Otototoï	Fonse	Richard Rein	TV movie
1983	Itinéraire bis	Cyprien	Christian Drillaud	
1983	Eréndira	Photographer	Ruy Guerra	
1985	On the Killer's Track	Pierre Hacker	Hajo Gies	
1985	Série noire	Léopold	José Giovanni (3)	TV series (1 episode)
1986	Exploits of a Young Don Juan	The Monk	Gianfranco Mingozzi	
1987	Vera		Béatrice Pollet	
1987	Ubac	The Hunchback	Jean-Pierre Grasset	
1987	Poisons	Louis Loiseau	Pierre Maillard	
1987	Keep Your Right Up	The Cop	Jean-Luc Godard	
1987	Horoscope favorable		Christine Ehm	Short
1987	Tatort	Hacker	Hajo Gies (2)	TV series (1 episode)
1988	Les deux cervelles		Pierre Baudry & Michaëla Watteaux	Short
1988	Sueurs froides	Jacques	Arnaud Sélignac	TV series (1 episode)
1988	Les enquêtes du commissaire Maigret	Inspector Fumel	Jean-Marie Coldefy	TV series (1 episode)
1989	En attendant Godot	Vladimir	Walter D. Asmus	TV movie
1989	Mary de Cork	Jimmy	Robin Davis (2)	TV movie
1989	Femme de papier	Monsieur Courtois	Suzanne Schiffman	TV movie
1990	L'Autrichienne	Father Girard	Pierre Granier-Deferre	
1990	Promotion canapé	Inspector of Justice	Didier Kaminka (2)	
1990	Lacenaire	Canler	Francis Girod	
1990	La goutte d'or	Sigisbert	Marcel Bluwal	TV movie
1990	Le Gorille	Camille Malemans	Jean Delannoy	TV series (1 episode)
1991	Delicatessen	Robert Kube	Marc Caro & Jean-Pierre Jeunet	
1991	Ferbac	Fernand Graucourt	Marc Rivière	TV series (1 episode)
1992	Liebesreise	Manol	Sylvia Hoffmann	TV movie
1992	Coup de chance	Dorta	Pierre Aknine	TV movie
1992	Parfum de bébé	Raymond	Serge Meynard	TV movie
1993	La ballade d'un condamné		Anne-Laure Brénéol	Short
1993	Christinas Seitensprung	The Psychoanalyst	Oliver Storz	TV movie
1994	Des feux mal éteints	Commander Perleau	Serge Moati	
1994	Joe & Marie	Joe's father	Tania Stöcklin	
1994	Le mangeur de lune	Father Simon	Dai Sijie	
1994	L'amour est un jeu d'enfant	Dorta	Pierre Grimblat	TV movie
1995	Les Misérables	Monsieur Thénardier	Claude Lelouch (2)	
1995	The City of Lost Children	Peeler	Marc Caro & Jean-Pierre Jeunet (2)	
1995	Le nid tombé de l'oiseau	Emile Savigneau	Alain Schwartzstein	TV movie
1996	J'ai échoué	The Grand father	Philippe Donzelot	Short
1996	Tendre piège	Monsieur Gallibert	Serge Moati (2)	TV movie
1996	La guerre des moutons	Marcel	Rémy Burkel	TV movie
1996	Crime à l'altimètre	Octave	José Giovanni (4)	TV movie
1996	La comète	The Hurdy-Gurdy	Claude Santelli	TV movie
1996	Strangers	Dr. Hoskin	Arnaud Sélignac (2)	TV series (1 episode)
1996	Julie Lescaut	Bellanger	Alain Bonnot	TV series (1 episode)
1997	Metroland	Henri	Philip Saville	
1997	C'est la tangente que je préfère	A spectator	Charlotte Silvera	
1997	Les tourments de Miss Murphy	Voice	Jean-Noël Delamarre	Short
1997	Une soupe aux herbes sauvages	Joseph	Alain Bonnot (2)	TV movie
1997	Inspecteur Moretti	Salengre	Gilles Béhat	TV series (1 episode)
1998	Que la lumière soit	Harper's Driver	Arthur Joffé	
1998	Le Radeau de la Méduse	Soldier Musician	Iradj Azimi	
1998	Train of Life	Mordechai	Radu Mihăileanu	
1998	Un mois de réflexion	Georges Galibert	Serge Moati (3)	TV movie
1998	Le feu sous la glace	Albert Duparc	Françoise Decaux-Thomelet	TV movie
1999	De père en fils	Serge	Jérôme Foulon	TV movie
1999	Lazzaroni	Oncle Victeur	Serge Moati (4)	TV movie
2000	Carpe Diem		Elisabeth Aubert Schlumberger	Short
2001	Amélie	Raphaël Poulain	Jean-Pierre Jeunet (3)	Nominated - César Award for Best Supporting Actor
2001	Mon père, il m'a sauvé la vie	Grinval	José Giovanni (5)	
2002-04	Juliette Lesage, médecine pour tous	Murol	Christian François	TV series (3 episodes)
2003	Comme si de rien n'était	Edouard	Pierre-Olivier Mornas	
2003	That Day	Hubus	Raúl Ruiz	
2003	Entrusted	Professor Bergot	Giacomo Battiato	TV movie
2003	Saint-Germain ou La négociation	Monsieur de Biron	Gérard Corbiau	TV movie
2003	Hôtel des deux mondes	Mage Radjapour	Philippe Miquel	TV movie
2003	Commissaire Meyer	Commissioner François Meyer	Michel Favart	TV series (1 episode)
2004	Le grand rôle	Monsieur Silberman	Steve Suissa	
2004	À ton image	Mathilde's father	Aruna Villiers	
2004	Madame Édouard	Valdès	Nadine Monfils	
2004	A Very Long Engagement	The Breton	Jean-Pierre Jeunet (4)	
2004	Bonhomme de chemin	Oscar	Frédéric Mermoud	TV movie
2005	Iznogoud	The Counselor	Patrick Braoudé	
2006	Du jour au lendemain	Cremer	Philippe Le Guay	
2006	Les aiguilles rouges	Marullaz	Jean-François Davy (2)	
2006	Les irréductibles	Edmond	Renaud Bertrand	
2006	Qui m'aime me suive	Jean-Pierre	Benoît Cohen	
2006	Les vauriens	Fouchs	Dominique Ladoge	TV movie
2006	La volière aux enfants	The Bishop	Olivier Guignard	TV movie
2006	Le Cri	Monsieur Lesage	Hervé Baslé	TV mini-series
2007	His Majesty Minor	Rectus	Jean-Jacques Annaud	
2007	Ma vie n'est pas une comédie romantique	Thomas's father	Marc Gibaja	
2007	Le sang noir	Cripure	Peter Kassovitz (2)	TV movie Luchon International Film Festival - Best Actor
2007	Tragédie en direct	Paul	Marc Rivière (2)	TV movie
2008	Mes stars et moi	Victor	Laetitia Colombani	
2008	Myster Mocky présente	Various	Jean-Pierre Mocky	TV series (1 episode)
2009	King Guillaume	King Cyril-John Delagny	Pierre-François Martin-Laval	
2009	Tricheuse	Monsieur Paroquet	Jean-François Davy (3)	
2009	Korkoro	Fernand	Tony Gatlif	
2009	Adieu créature		David Perrault	Short
2009	La reine et le cardinal	Cardinal Richelieu	Marc Rivière (3)	TV movie
2010	Carnets de rêves	The Man	Baptiste Gourden	Short
2010	Colombe	La Surette	Dominique Thiel	TV movie
2010	Colère	Germain Bougron	Jean-Pierre Mocky (2)	TV movie
2010	Profilage	Jacques Mirmont	Eric Summer	TV series (1 episode)
2011	Crédit pour tous	Pistille	Jean-Pierre Mocky (3)	
2011	Les insomniaques	The Commissioner	Jean-Pierre Mocky (4)	
2011	Je m'appelle Bernadette	Monseigneur Forcade	Jean Sagols	
2011	La part des anges	Emile	Sylvain Monod	TV movie
2011	Le repaire de la vouivre	Édouard Pratt	Edwin Baily	TV mini-series
2011	Le sang de la vigne	Jounenaze	Marc Rivière (4)	TV series (1 episode)
2012	10 jours en or	Father Clément Rozière	Nicolas Brossette	
2012	Les parapluies migrateurs	Elios	Melanie Laleu	Short
2012	La larme du fantôme	The Man	Florian Quittard	Short
2012	Je retourne chez ma mère	Paul	Williams Crépin	TV movie
2013	Pas très normales activités	Levantour	Maurice Barthélemy	
2013	Marius	Piquoiseau	Daniel Auteuil	
2013	The Marchers	François	Nabil Ben Yadir	
2013	À votre bon coeur mesdames	Doctor Andreausse	Jean-Pierre Mocky (5)	
2013	Je veille sur vous	Jacques	Elodie Fiabane	Short
2013	Passe le briquet à ton voisin	The Fisherman	Sachka Lelouch	Short
2013	Through Blue Summer Nights	Jean	Nicolas Barth	Short
2013	Chérif	Monsieur Hurtince	Julien Zidi	TV series (1 episode)
2014	Salaud, on t'aime	Le Ruf	Claude Lelouch (3)	
2014	Soleils	Voltaire	Olivier Delahaye & Dani Kouyaté	
2014	La menace d'une rose	Q	Thomas Lhermitte	Short
2014	La déesse aux cent bras	Le Dantec	Sylvain Monod (2)	TV movie
2015	Chant d'hiver		Otar Iosseliani	
2016	The African Doctor	Jean	Julien Rambaldi	
2017	Chacun sa vie et son intime conviction	The taxi driver	Claude Lelouch (4)	
2017	Knock	The old Jules	Lorraine Lévy	
