= Dominique Pinon =

French actor (born 1955)

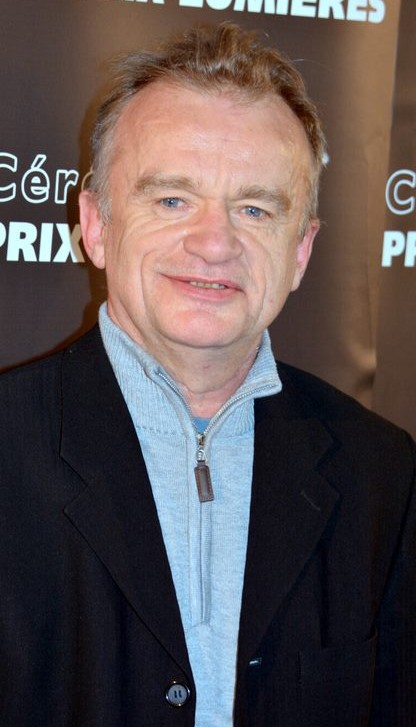
- Pinon in 2015
- Born: 4 March 1955 (age 71); Saumur, Maine-et-Loire, France
- Occupation: Actor
- Years active: 1980–present

Dominique Pinon (born 4 March 1955) is a French actor. He appeared in films directed by Jean-Pierre Jeunet.

== Early life and education ==
Dominique Pinon was born in Saumur, Maine-et-Loire, France on 4 March 1955. After studying at the Faculty of Arts of Poitiers, Pinon moved to Paris and enrolled at the Cours Simon.

== Career ==
As an actor Pinon has performed in theatre, film and television.

=== Film ===
In 1981, Pinon appeared in his debut film, Diva.

Pinon has had several roles in the films of Jean-Pierre Jeunet including Delicatessen, The City of Lost Children, Alien Resurrection, Amélie and A Very Long Engagement.

Pinon appeared in The Bridge of San Luis Rey. Adapted from a work by Thornton Wilder, The Bridge of San Luis Rey also starred Robert De Niro, Harvey Keitel, Gabriel Byrne, Kathy Bates, F. Murray Abraham and Geraldine Chaplin.

Pinon also appeared in Álex de la Iglesia's 2008 The Oxford Murders with Elijah Wood, John Hurt and Leonor Watling.

=== Theatre ===
In the theatre, he has appeared in the plays of Gildas Bourdet, Jorge Lavelli, and Valère Novarina.

In 2023, he played in La couleur des souvenirs written and directed by Fabio Marra at the Théâtre des halles during the Avignon Festival. The play had a second run at the 2025 Festival at the Théâtre du Balcon.

== Awards and recognition ==
Pinon received the Molière Award for Best Actor in 2004. In 2011, he was the president of the jury for the second Festival International du Film fantastique d'Audincourt. He has been an officer of the Ordre des Arts et des Lettres since 2014.

=== Honours ===
- Méliès Career Award: In October 2025 Pinon was honoured with the Méliès Career Award at 58th Sitges Film Festival in Sitges.

== Works ==
=== On stage ===
Year	Title	Author	Director	Notes
1985	Une station service	Gildas Bourdet	Gildas Bourdet	
1988	L'Inconvenant	Gildas Bourdet	Gildas Bourdet	
1990–91	L'Été	Romain Weingarten	Gildas Bourdet	
1993	Maison d'arrêt	Edward Bond	Jorge Lavelli	
1994	Love in the Crimea	Sławomir Mrożek	Jorge Lavelli	
1995	The Death of Auguste	Romain Weingarten	Gildas Bourdet	
1996	The Collected Works of Billy the Kid: Left-Handed Poems	Michael Ondaatje	Frank Hoffmann	
1997–98	Six Characters in Search of an Author	Luigi Pirandello	Jorge Lavelli	
1999	Pour Louis de Funès	Valère Novarina	Renaud Cojo	
2000	L'Origine rouge	Valère Novarina	Valère Novarina	
2000	Mein Kampf (farce)	George Tabori	Jorge Lavelli	
2001	L'Ombre de Venceslao	Copi	Jorge Lavelli	
2002	L'Origine rouge	Valère Novarina	Valère Novarina	
2002	A Midsummer Night's Dream	William Shakespeare	Yannis Kokkos	
2003	L'Incroyable Voyage	Gilles Granouillet	Philippe Adrien	
2003	Providence Café	Mohamed Rouabhi	Mohamed Rouabhi	
2003–04	La Scène	Valère Novarina	Valère Novarina	
2004–05	L'Hiver sous la table	Roland Topor	Zabou Breitman	Molière Award for Best Actor
2005	L'Âge d'or	Maurice Desvallières, Georges Feydeau & Louis Varney	Claudia Stavisky	
2006	Arnaques, cocaïne et bricolage	Mohamed Rouabhi	Clotilde Moynot	
2007	L'Acte inconnu	Valère Novarina	Valère Novarina	
2007–08	King Lear	William Shakespeare	Laurent Fréchuret	
2008–09	Endgame	Samuel Beckett	Charles Berling	
2009	Le Tribun	Mauricio Kagel	Charles Tordjman	
2010	On purge bébé & Léonie est en avance	Georges Feydeau	Gildas Bourdet	
2010	Pour Louis de Funès	Valère Novarina	Valère Novarina	
2010–11	Un pied dans le crime	Eugène Marin Labiche	Jean-Louis Benoît	
2011	Madame Sans-Gêne	Victorien Sardou & Émile Moreau	Alain Sachs	
2011–12	The Lonesome West	Martin McDonagh	Ladislas Chollat	
2012	Hollywood	Ron Hutchinson	Daniel Colas	
2012	All That Fall	Samuel Beckett	Jacques Nichet	
2012	Schopenhauer, lettres à son disciple			
2013	The Madwoman of Chaillot	Jean Giraudoux	Didier Long	
2013	Résumons-nous, la semaine a été désastreuse	Alexandre Vialatte	Charles Tordjman	
2012–14	Address Unknown	Kathrine Taylor	Delphine de Malherbe	
2014	Richard III	William Shakespeare	Laurent Fréchuret	
2014	The Tempest	William Shakespeare	Christophe Lidon	
2015	Les Lois de la gravité	Jean Teulé	Anne Bourgeois	
2023	La couleur des souvenirs	Fabio Marra	Fabio Marra	

=== Filmography ===
Year	Title	Role	Director	Notes
1980	La découverte	The young painter	Arthur Joffé	Short
1981	Diva	"The Priest"	Jean-Jacques Beineix	
1981	Une pierre, un arbre, un nuage		Christine van de Putte	Short
1981	Samantha	Loulou	Victor Vicas	TV movie
1981	Julien Fontanes, magistrat		François Dupont-Midi	TV series (1 Episode)
1982	The Return of Martin Guerre	Antoine	Daniel Vigne	Nominated - César Award for Most Promising Actor
1982	Tir groupé	Daniel Verlot	Jean-Claude Missiaen	
1982	Merlin ou le cours de l'or	The son	Arthur Joffé (2)	Short
1982	Il est trop tard pour rien		Pierre Novion	Short
1982	Le village sur la colline	Renaud	Yves Laumet	TV Miniseries
1983	Ghost Dance	Salesman	Ken McMullen	
1983	Moon in the Gutter	Frank	Jean-Jacques Beineix (2)	
1983	Si j'avais mille ans		Monique Enckell	
1983	Le cimetière des voitures	Ybar	Fernando Arrabal	TV movie
1983	Merci Sylvestre	Ballu	Serge Korber	TV series (6 Episodes)
1984	Le thé à la menthe	Roger	Abdelkrim Bahloul	
1984	Nemo	Monkey	Arnaud Sélignac	
1984	Mon inconnue		Philippe Harel	Short
1985	Partir, revenir	A villager	Claude Lelouch	
1985	Zina	Pierre	Ken McMullen (2)	
1985	Le téléphone sonne toujours deux fois!!	Professor Pichon	Jean-Pierre Vergne	
1985	La baston	Marcel Noblet	Jean-Claude Missiaen (2)	
1985	Quiz		Jérôme George	Short
1985	Cyril Tourneur		Jean-Pierre Gras	Short
1985	Via Mala	Niklaus Lauretz	Tom Toelle	TV Miniseries
1986	Betty Blue	The drug dealer	Jean-Jacques Beineix (3)	
1986	Sauve-toi, Lola	Jean-Pierre	Michel Drach	
1986	Suivez mon regard	Frédéric	Jean Curtelin	
1986	Cent francs l'amour	Tom	Jacques Richard	
1986	Rückfahrt in den Tod	Fred	Hans-Jürgen Tögel	TV movie
1987	Devil's Paradise	Gato	Vadim Glowna	
1987	La voix du désert		Jean-Michel Roux	Short
1987	Chamane		Thomas Gilou	Short
1988	Frantic	Wino	Roman Polanski	
1988	The Legend of the Holy Drinker	Woitech	Ermanno Olmi	
1988	Anaon		François-Renaud Labarthe	Short
1988	La mort mystérieuse de Nina Chéreau	Albert	Dennis Berry	TV movie
1989	La Révolution française	Jean-Baptiste Drouet	Robert Enrico	
1989	Things I Like, Things I Don't Like (Foutaises)	The Man	Jean-Pierre Jeunet	Short
1989	Trouble		Yannick Saillet	Short
1989	Paris mirage	Avati	Yves Laumet (2)	TV movie
1989	Série noire	Chanier	Laurent Heynemann	TV series (1 Episode)
1990	1871	Napoleon III	Ken McMullen (3)	
1990	Alberto Express	The driver	Arthur Joffé (3)	
1990	Bleu marine	Charles	Jean-Claude Riga	
1990	La mandragore		Aziz Lamzouris	Short
1991	Delicatessen	Louison	Marc Caro & Jean-Pierre Jeunet (2)	Sitges Film Festival - Best Actor
1991	Les arcandiers	Bruno	Manuel Sanchez	
1991	Août	Eugène Blouzette	Henri Herré	
1991	25 décembre 58, 10h36		Diane Bertrand	Short
1991	L'illuminé		Philippe Barcouzareaud	Short
1991	Le roi Mystère	Cassecou	Paul Planchon	TV Mini-Series
1992	Mémento		Jean-Max Peteau	Short
1992	'R': Rembrandt		Ken McMullen (4)	TV Short
1993	La cavale des fous	Angel	Marco Pico	
1993	Je m'appelle Victor	Bernard	Guy Jacques	
1993	Stella plage		Elisabeth Prouvost	Short
1993	Ma petite Mimi	René	Roger Kahane	TV movie
1994	KO Kid		Marc Caro (2)	Short
1995	The City of Lost Children	The diver / the clones	Marc Caro & Jean-Pierre Jeunet (3)	
1996	A Saturday on Earth	Morel	Diane Bertrand (2)	
1996	La gotera		Grojo & Jorge Sánchez-Cabezudo	Short
1997	Alien Resurrection	Dom Vriess	Jean-Pierre Jeunet (4)	
1997	Mordbüro	Eugène	Lionel Kopp	
1997	Violetta la reine de la moto	Adrien	Guy Jacques (2)	
1997	Photomaton		Philippe Dorison	Short
1999	Quasimodo d'El Paris	Clopin Trouillefou	Patrick Timsit	
1999	Comme un poisson hors de l'eau	Melvin	Hervé Hadmar	
1999	Djedi		Lionel Escama	Short
2000	Sur un air d'autoroute	Jacky Carpe	Thierry Boscheron	
2000	Sabotage!	Armani	Esteban Ibarretxe & Jose Miguel Ibarretxe	
2000	Der Pilot	Pilot	Oliver Seiter	Short
2000	Vestiaire obligatoire	M. Muk	Bertrand Stephant Andrews	Short
2001	Beautiful Memories	Robert	Zabou Breitman	
2001	Amélie	Joseph	Jean-Pierre Jeunet (5)	
2001	Putain, la vieille faut pas l'énerver!		Abel Ferry	Short
2002	Alice		James Eaves & Johannes Roberts	
2002	Dead or Alive	The Butcher	Paulo Machline	Short
2002	Lilith		Fabien Martorell	Short
2003	Mortadelo & Filemon: The Big Adventure	Fredy Mazas	Javier Fesser	
2003	Bienvenue chez les Rozes	Lieutenant	Francis Palluau	
2003	Parts of the Family	Television's woman	Léon Paul De Bruyn	
2003	Europa	Schmidt & Smith	Carlo Avventi & Christophe Bruncher	Short
2003	From Another Point of View	Henri	Ken Duken & Bernd Katzmarczyk	Short
2003	Entrusted	Henri Lafont	Giacomo Battiato	TV movie
2003	Petits mythes urbains	The Butcher	Stéphane Gateau & Paulo Machline (2)	TV series (1 Episode)
2004	The Bridge of San Luis Rey	His Excellency's Fop	Mary McGuckian	
2004	Hellbreeder	Detective Weiss	James Eaves & Johannes Roberts (2)	
2004	A Very Long Engagement	Sylvain	Jean-Pierre Jeunet (6)	
2004	Darkhunters	Charlie Jackson	Johannes Roberts (3)	
2004	Ne quittez pas!	The homeless	Arthur Joffé (4)	
2004	Kurz - Der Film		Bernhard Haux, Oliver Seiter (2), ...	
2004	Lift	Otis	Hugues Dalton & Jeff Garton	Short
2004	Le bon, la brute et les zombies	Little Cowboy	Abel Ferry (2)	Short
2004	Caméra Café	Jean-Pierre	Francis Duquet	TV series (1 Episode)
2005	Your Name Is Justine	Uncle Goran	Franco de Peña	
2005	L'hiver sous la table	Dragomir	Zabou Breitman (2)	
2005	Camping à la ferme	Rodolphe	Jean-Pierre Sinapi	
2005	Ze film	The homeless	Guy Jacques (3)	
2006	Dikkenek	Stef	Olivier Van Hoofstadt	
2006	Busker	The Mime	David Wigram	Short
2006	When Evil Calls	Detective Ringwald	Johannes Roberts (4)	TV Miniseries
2006	Sable noir	Axel	Harry Cleven	TV series (1 Episode)
2006	Nachtschicht	Emile Gaspard	Lars Becker	TV series (1 Episode)
2007	Roman de Gare	Pierre Laclos	Claude Lelouch (2)	
2007	Midsummer Madness	Toni	Alexander Hahn	Nominated - Latvian National Film Festival - Best Supporting Actor
2007	La luna en botella	Pascal Rossignol	Grojo (2)	
2007	La praline	511	Jean-Baptiste Chuat	Short
2007	L'acte inconnu		Dominique Thiel	TV movie
2008	The Oxford Murders	Frank	Álex de la Iglesia	
2008	Musée haut, musée bas	Simon	Jean-Michel Ribes	
2008	Dante 01	César	Marc Caro (4)	
2008	Le Queloune		Patrick Boivin	Short
2008	Seared	The Butcher	James Nicholas Fuller	Short
2009	Morris: A Life with Bells On	Jean Baptiste	Lucy Akhurst	
2009	Micmacs	Fracasse	Jean-Pierre Jeunet (7)	
2009	Humains	Gildas	Jacques-Olivier Molon & Pierre-Olivier Thevenin	
2009	An Organization of Dreams	Inspector	Ken McMullen (5)	
2009	La loi de Murphy	Rudy	Christophe Campos	
2009	Histoire trouble	Voice	Jérôme Lefdup	
2009	L'eau vive	Yann	Arthur Joffé (5)	TV Short
2010	What War May Bring	Maurice Lemoine	Claude Lelouch (3)	
2010	Mumu	Roger's father	Joël Séria	
2010	Cul de Bouteille	Narrator	Jean-Claude Rozec	Short
2010	Domino(S)	Matteo	Charles Poupot	Short
2010	Colère	Mougin	Jean-Pierre Mocky	TV movie
2010	Paradisiaque	DomJik	Igor Pejic	TV series (1 Episode)
2010	Au siècle de Maupassant	Dubenoit	Jacques Santamaria	TV series (1 Episode)
2011	Holidays by the Sea	The caravan's man	Pascal Rabaté	
2011	Crédit pour tous	Gobert	Jean-Pierre Mocky (2)	
2011	L'orpheline avec en plus un bras en moins	Inspector Lamentin	Jacques Richard (2)	
2011	Poupée chagrin		Marion Barthès	Short
2011	Un pied dans le crime	Gaudiband	Dominique Thiel (2)	TV movie
2012	La balle de trop	Jeff	Sébastien Chaplais & Mehdi Mostefaï	Short
2012	Les parapluies migrateurs	Jean-Pierre	Melanie Laleu	Short
2012	La guerre du Royal Palace	Colonel Otto Strudel	Claude-Michel Rome	TV movie
2012	Le Romancier Martin		Jérôme Foulon	TV Miniseries
2012	Foot Lose	Mr. Lopez	Charles Meurisse	TV series (1 Episode)
2012	Le sang de la vigne	Milou Savin	Aruna Villiers	TV series (1 Episode)
2013	Serial Teachers	The school inspector	Pierre-François Martin-Laval	
2013	The Young and Prodigious T. S. Spivet	Two Clouds	Jean-Pierre Jeunet (8)	
2013	Suzanne	Jean	Wilfried Méance	Short
2013	Myster Mocky présente	Various	Jean-Pierre Mocky (3)	TV series (3 Episodes)
2014	My Old Lady	Auguste Lefebvre	Israel Horovitz	
2014	Brèves de comptoir	Taxi driver	Jean-Michel Ribes (2)	
2014	Somewhere Beautiful	Magazine Editor	Albert Kodagolian	
2014	Ferdinand Knapp	Ferdinand Knapp	Andrea Baldini	Short; VideoMaker Film Festival - Best Actor
2014	Les Petits Meurtres d'Agatha Christie	Hubert Petitpont	Marc Angelo	TV series (1 Episode)
2014	Métal Hurlant Chronicles	Stanley Summers	Guillaume Lubrano	TV series (3 Episodes)
2015	Soulless 2	Bernard	Roman Prygunov	
2015	The Price of Desire	Fernand Leger	Mary McGuckian (2)	
2015	A Love You	Serge	Paul Lefèvre	
2015–present	Cassandre	Jean-Paul Marchand	Eric Duret, Éric Le Roux & Bruno Garcia	TV series (4 Episodes)
2016	La folle histoire de Max et Léon	Michel	Jonathan Barré	
2016	Outlander	Master Raymond	Metin Hüseyin & Douglas Mackinnon	TV series (5 Episodes); Nominated - Saturn Award for Best Guest Performance on a Television Series
2017	Based on a True Story		Roman Polanski (2)	
2017	La Dormeuse Duval	Basile Matrin	Manuel Sanchez (2)	
2017	Vive la crise	Noël	Jean-François Davy	
2017	Two Snails Set Off		Romain Segaud & Jean-Pierre Jeunet (9)	Short
2017	Trois aveugles	Yoni	Félix Lantieri	Short
2018	Caminhos Magnéticos		Edgar Pêra	
2018	Go West !	Maslo	Alexander Hahn (2)	
2022	Good People	Roger Rabet	Stéphane Bergmans, Matthieu Donck, Benjamin d'Aoust	TV series (5 episodes)
2023	The Walking Dead: Daryl Dixon	Antoine	Tim Southam	TV Series (2 Episodes)
2024	Memoir of a Snail	Percy Pudel	Adam Elliot	Voice role
2024	She Loved Blossoms More	Logo	Yannis Veslemes	
