= Edith Ker =

French actress (1910–1997)

Édith Ker, born Édith Denise Keraudren (1910–1997) was a French actress born in Brest (Finistère). She is best known to English-speaking audiences as the grandmother in Jean-Pierre Jeunet's Delicatessen.

== Filmography ==
- 1957: Fernand clochard (de Pierre Chevalier)
- 1962: Les Bricoleurs (de Jean Girault)
- 1962: Le Gentleman d'Epsom (de Gilles Grangier)
- 1964: La Fleur de l'âge (de John Guillermin)
- 1964: Le Vampire de Düsseldorf (de Robert Hossein)
- 1965: Fantômas se déchaîne (d'André Hunebelle)
- 1965: Tant qu'on a la santé (de Pierre Étaix)
- 1967: La mariée était en noir (de François Truffaut)
- 1968: La Grande Lessive (!) (de Jean-Pierre Mocky) - La bonne des Lavalette
- 1969: La Peau de Torpedo (de Jean Delannoy)
- 1971: L'Italien des roses (de Charles Matton)
- 1972: Elle cause plus... elle flingue (de Michel Audiard)
- 1974: Les Filles de Malemort (de Daniel Daërt)
- 1974: Le Futur aux trousses (de Dolorès Grassian)
- 1974: Y'a un os dans la moulinette (de Raoul André)
- 1975: Divine (de Dominique Delouche)
- 1979: Tous vedettes (de Michel Lang)
- 1990: Delicatessen (de Jean-Pierre Jeunet et Marc Caro) - Grandmother (final film role)
