= Philippe Chiffre =

Philippe Chiffre is a French cinema Production Designer.

== Biography ==
Philippe Chiffre is the son of Yvan Chiffre, and the father of Cesar Chiffre.

Painter, he started as an intern in the decoration in the cinema 1974 to Zorro of Duccio Tessari. Intern, assistant, assembler, head painter, he traveled all the posts on twenty films before becoming a Production Designer in 1988.

== Filmography ==
- 2010 : Cloclo
- 2010 : La croisière
- 2010 : Point Blank
- 2010 : Les petits mouchoirs
- 2010 : 22 Bullets
- 2009 : De l'autre côté du lit
- 2008 : Pour elle
- 2008 : Modern Love
- 2007 : Hellphone
- 2007 : Vent mauvais
- 2006 : Tell No One
- 2005 : La boîte noire
- 2004 : Dans tes rêves
- 2003 : Narco
- 2002 : À ton image
- 2001 : Mortel transfert
- 2000 : Woman on Top
- 1999 : Rembrandt (1999 film)
- 1998 : Une vie de prince
- 1997 : Assassin(s)
- 1996 : Un samedi sur la terre
- 1996 : L'appartement
- 1995 : Pullman paradis
- 1994 : Petits arrangements avec les morts
- 1994 : Mina Tannenbaum
- 1992 : La petite apocalypse
- 1990 : Plaisir d'amour
- 1989 : President's Target
- 1987 : Camomille

== Awards ==
- 2000 : César Award for Best Production Design for Rembrandt.
