= The City of Lost Children =

1995 film directed by Marc Caro and Jean-Pierre Jeunet

- French release poster
- Directed by: Marc Caro; Jean-Pierre Jeunet
- Written by: Marc Caro; Jean-Pierre Jeunet; Gilles Adrien
- Produced by: Claudie Ossard
- Starring: Ron Perlman; Daniel Emilfork; Judith Vittet; Dominique Pinon; Jean-Claude Dreyfus; Geneviève Brunet; Odile Mallet; Mireille Mossé; Serge Merlin; François Hadji-Lazaro; Rufus; Ticky Holgado; Jean-Louis Trintignant
- Cinematography: Darius Khondji
- Edited by: Hervé Schneid
- Music by: Angelo Badalamenti
- Production companies: Le Studio Canal+; Centre National de la Cinématographie; Eurimages; France 3 Cinéma; Televisión Española
- Distributed by: Union Générale Cinématographique (France); Alta Films (Spain); Concorde-Castle Rock/Turner (Germany)
- Release dates: May 1995 (Cannes); 17 May 1995 (France); 17 August 1995 (Germany)
- Running time: 112 minutes
- Countries: France; Spain; Germany
- Language: French
- Budget: $18 million
- Box office: $11 million

The City of Lost Children (French: La Cité des enfants perdus) is a 1995 fantasy film directed by Marc Caro and Jean-Pierre Jeunet, written by Jeunet and Gilles Adrien, and starring Ron Perlman. An international co-production of companies from France, Germany, and Spain, the film is stylistically related to the previous and subsequent Jeunet films, Delicatessen (1991) and Amélie (2001).

The musical score was composed by Angelo Badalamenti with costumes designed by Jean Paul Gaultier. It was entered into the 1995 Cannes Film Festival.

== Plot ==
Krank, a highly intelligent but malicious being created by a vanished scientist, is unable to dream, which causes him to age prematurely. At his lair on an abandoned oil rig (which he shares with the scientist's other creations: six childish clones, a dwarf named Martha, and a brain in a vat named Irvin), he uses a dream-extracting machine to steal dreams from children. The children are kidnapped for him from a nearby port city by a cyborg cult called "the Cyclops"; in exchange, he supplies them with mechanical eyes and ears. Among the kidnapped is Denrée, the adopted little brother of carnival strongman One.

After the carnival manager is stabbed by a mugger, One is hired by a criminal gang of orphans (run by a pair of conjoined twins called "the Octopus") to help them steal a safe. The theft is successful, but the safe is lost in the harbor when One is distracted by seeing Denrée's kidnappers. He, together with one of the orphans, a little girl called Miette, follows the Cyclops and infiltrates their headquarters, but they are captured and sentenced to execution. Meanwhile, the Octopus orders circus performer Marcello to return One to them. He uses his trained fleas, which inject a poison capsule that causes mindless aggression, to turn the Cyclops guards against each other. While Marcello is rescuing One, Miette falls into the harbor and sinks, seemingly drowned, but an amnesiac diver living beneath the harbor rescues her.

Miette leaves the diver's lair to find One and Marcello both drowning their sorrows in a bar. Upon seeing Miette alive, the remorseful Marcello lets One leave with her. However, the Octopus confronts them on the pier, and uses Marcello's stolen fleas to turn One against Miette. A spectacular chain of events triggered by one of Miette's tears leads to a ship crashing into the pier before One can throttle her. Marcello arrives and sets the fleas on the Octopus, allowing One and Miette to escape to continue searching for Denrée.

Back at Krank's lair, Irvin tricks one of the clones into releasing a plea for help in the form of a bottled dream telling the story of what is happening on the oil rig. It reaches One, Miette, and the diver, and the latter remembers that he was the scientist who made them, and that the rig was his laboratory before Krank and Martha pushed him off it and took it for themselves, leaving him for dead in the water. They all converge on the rig; the diver to destroy it, and One and Miette to rescue Denrée.

Miette is almost killed by Martha, but the diver slays her with a harpoon. Miette then finds Denrée asleep in Krank's dream-extracting machine. Irvin tells her that to release him she must use the machine to enter the dream herself. In the dream world, she meets Krank and offers to replace the boy as the source of the dream; Krank fears a trap but plays along, believing himself to be in control. Miette then uses her imagination to turn the dream into an infinite loop, destroying Krank's mind. One and Miette rescue all the children, while the now-deranged diver loads the rig with dynamite and straps himself to one of its legs. The diver regains his senses as everyone is rowing away and begs his remaining creations to rescue him, but a seabird lands on the handle of the blasting machine, blowing up him and the rig.

== Cast ==
- Ron Perlman as One
- Judith Vittet as Miette (Crumb in French)
- Daniel Emilfork as Krank (Sick in German)
- Joseph Lucien as Denrée
- Dominique Pinon as the diver and the clones
- Geneviève Brunet and Odile Mallet as the Octopus
- Jean-Claude Dreyfus as Marcello
- Jean-Louis Trintignant as Uncle Irvin (voice)
- Mireille Mossé as Martha
- Rufus as Peeler
- Serge Merlin as Gabriel Marie, chief of the Cyclops
- Marc Caro as Frère Ange-Joseph
- Ticky Holgado as an ex-acrobat
- François Hadji-Lazaro as Killer
- Dominique Bettenfeld as Bogdan
- Lotfi Yahya Jedidi as Melchior
- Thierry Gibault as Brutus
- Christophe Salengro as a soldier
- Lorella Cravotta as a woman at her window
- Mathieu Kassovitz as a man on the street

== Reception ==
The film holds an 80% approval rating on Rotten Tomatoes based on 59 reviews, with an average rating of 7.4/10. The website's critical consensus reads, "Not all of its many intriguing ideas are developed, but The City of Lost Children is an engrossing, disturbing, profoundly memorable experience." It also holds a weighted average score of 73 on Metacritic, based on 16 critics, indicating "generally favorable reviews". Roger Ebert gave the film 3 stars out of a possible 4, writing that the film's design and visual effects deserved the highest possible praise but the story was sometimes confusing: "I would be lying if I said I understood the plot."

The film grossed $7 million in France, $1 million in Spain and $600,000 in Germany. In the United States and Canada it grossed $1.7 million. Including receipts from the UK (£401,523) and Australia, it has grossed over $11 million worldwide.

=== Interpretation ===
According to authors Jen Webb and Tony Schirato, the dual nature of capitalism constitutes a main source of tension in the film:

On the one hand, capitalism is presented as enabling self-interest and freedom, as exemplified by the freedom to produce scientific developments (Krank), pursue religious ideas (the Cyclopses), and seek wealth (the Octopus). On the other hand, it exposes the deplorable effects of capitalism ... the exploitation of childhood (the cynical orphans), of tenderness (the Original scientist, attacked and turned out by his own beloved creations), and of innocence (the terrified children whose dreams are stolen) while suggesting that there is no place in capitalism for originality, disinterestedness, duty, self-reflective analysis, and other defining aspects of "the human".

According to author Donna Wilkerson-Barker, these elusive aspects of humanity are presented within the film for various characters to identify with. For example, the relationship between One and Denrée represents, for Miette, a family of authenticity. Prepared to sacrifice her life in order to become a part of their family, Miette helps One to save Denrée from Krank's manipulative environment. In another example, Irvin the brain plays his part in overturning the same environment in order to liberate his "family" of clones. In the end, two boats filled with these two different families row towards their futures: In one boat, a technologically produced family of Irvin and the clones; In the other, a rationally envisioned family containing Miette, One, and the abducted children. This leaves the audience to question precisely what the future will hold for these two differing visions of humanity.

As The City of Lost Children "proceeds in full awareness that the past to which it is committed never really existed", the film has been classified as an example of the steampunk genre.

== Influence ==
The City of Lost Children has been cited as an influence on the visual design of the original Fallout. Designer Tim Cain listed the film among the cinematic influences on the game's art direction, and later said that elements of Fallout's power armor and technology aesthetic drew from the film's helmet eyepieces, tubing, and vents.
