= Judith Vittet =

French actress (born 1984)

- Born: France
- Occupation: Actress
- Known for: The City of Lost Children

Judith Vittet is a French actress who played the role of Miette in the 1995 film The City of Lost Children.

Before The City of Lost Children, Vittet appeared in the film Personne ne m'aime (1994). She also had roles in Nelly and Mr. Arnaud (1995) and K (1997).

== Career ==
At the age of nine, Vittet was noticed by a casting director when she was leaving school. She appeared with Marion Vernoux and Claude Sautet in Nelly, and with Monsieur Arnaud and Alexandre Arcady in K. In 1995 she played the role of Miette in The City of Lost Children by Jean-Pierre Jeunet and Marc Caro.

After four films and obtaining her ES baccalaureate in 2002, she spent time in the United States and ended her acting career to continue her film studies at Paris VIII.

Until 2014, Vittet worked as a costume designer for a number of television series. She also developed her large formats for window displays. Leather trees, garlands of foliage, cotton seaweed, hand-embroidered clouds blend together in her textile installations on the theme of the forest and the ocean. Vittet exhibits her work at various fairs. In January 2018, she was an exhibition curator for the city of Guyancourt on the "Doudous!" project, organized as a tribute to textile art, which featured the city’s inhabitants through participatory workshops. Her exhibition of embroidered busts was dedicated to women victims of violence.
