= A Saturday on Earth =

1996 film

- Film poster
- Directed by: Diane Bertrand
- Written by: Diane Bertrand; Guillaume Laurant
- Produced by: Georges Benayoun
- Starring: Elsa Zylberstein
- Cinematography: Michel Amathieu
- Edited by: Maryline Monthieux
- Release date: 28 August 1996
- Running time: 95 minutes
- Country: France
- Language: French

A Saturday on Earth (French: Un samedi sur la terre) is a 1996 French drama film directed by Diane Bertrand. It was screened in the Un Certain Regard section at the 1996 Cannes Film Festival.

== Cast ==
- Elsa Zylberstein - Claire
- Eric Caravaca - Martin
- Johan Leysen - Franck
- Kent - Arnaud
- Dominique Pinon - Le brigadier Morel
- Silvie Laguna - Agathe Morel
- Agathe Dronne - Cathy
- Lionel Abelanski - Michel
- Liliane Rovère - Claire's mother
- Sandrine Cukierman - Singer
- Julian Paget - The kid with the bike
- Victor Garrivier - Marcellin
- Louise Vincent - Yvonne
- César Chiffre - Mathieu
- Christine Letailleur - Marylène
- Dominique Bettenfeld - Bobby
- Hadrien Bertrand - The kid with the dog
