= Hervé Schneid =

French film editor (born 1956)

- Occupation: Film editor

Hervé Schneid is a French film editor, who has edited most of the films by Jean-Pierre Jeunet. He won the 1992 César Award for Best Editing for his work on Delicatessen.

== Filmography ==
- Europa (1991)
- Delicatessen (1991)
- Orlando (1992)
- The City of Lost Children (1995)
- ...à la campagne (1995)
- Alien: Resurrection (1997)
- East/West (1999)
- Amélie (2001)
- A Very Long Engagement (2004)
- Micmacs (2009)
- The Young and Prodigious Spivet (2013)
- One Wild Moment (2015)
- Return to Montauk (2017)
