= César Chiffre =

- Born: César Chiffre; 18 April 1991; Drancy, France
- Occupations: Film director, screenwriter, actor

César Chiffre (born April 18, 1991) is a French director and actor. He is the third generation of a family with its roots in cinema. His grandfather Yvan Chiffre was film director and stunt coordinator and his father Philippe Chiffre is production designer.

== Biography ==
He directed his first movie at the age of 9. Chiffre has produced around fifty short films (including shorts, music videos, a 45-minute medium length movie, and has produced some thirty films to order.

In 2009, at the age of eighteen, he constructed his own camera system to direct Produit a short film in 3D with Alexis Loizon who played the lead character.

He has also worked on visual effects for Costa Gavras’ Eden is West, and as a graphic designer on films by Eric Rochant, Fred Cavayé, Richard Berry and Guillaume Canet. He directed the ‘Making Of’ for Florent Emilio Siri’s most recent film, and has directed promotional teasers for Eloïse Lang’s forthcoming film.

== Filmography ==
=== Director ===
==== Films ====
- 2018 : Larguées (making of)
- 2016 : Invitation sur le plateau (documentary)
- 2012 : Biennale de la Création des Arts Décoratifs: Paris (documentary)
- 2012 : Life (short)
- 2012 : Produit (short)
- 2012 : Something (short)

==== Video clips ====
- 2015 : Hi'Levelz - Back
- 2015 : Hi'Levelz - Pause
- 2015 : Hi'Levelz - Play

=== Graphic Designer ===
- 2017 : Rock'n Roll by Guillaume Canet
- 2015 : Nos Femmes by Richard Berry
- 2014 : Mea culpa by Fred Cavayé
- 2013 : Möbius by Eric Rochant

=== Actor ===
| Year | Title | Role | Notes |
|---|---|---|---|
| 1996 | The Apartment, by Gilles Mimouni | Enfant | |
| 1996 | Un samedi sur la terre, by Diane Bertrand | Mathieu | |
| 1998 | Tueur de petits poissons, by Alexandre Gavras | Kid | |
| 2010 | Something, by César Chiffre | James Turma | Short |
| 2010 | Produit, by César Chiffre | Présentateur Radio | Short |
