= Des journées entières dans les arbres =

1977 film by Marguerite Duras

- Film poster
- Directed by: Marguerite Duras
- Written by: Marguerite Duras
- Produced by: Patrice Ledoux
- Starring: Madeleine Renaud; Jean-Pierre Aumont; Bulle Ogier
- Cinematography: Néstor Almendros
- Edited by: Michel Latouche
- Music by: Carlos d'Alessio
- Production companies: Duras Films; Théâtre d'Orsay
- Distributed by: Gaumont Distribution
- Release date: February 9, 1977
- Running time: 95 minutes
- Country: France
- Language: French

Des journées entières dans les arbres (in English, Entire Days in the Trees) is a 1977 French film directed by Marguerite Duras, based on her novel. Prior to directing a film version of the novel, Duras had already modified it into a stageplay that had enjoyed a theatrical run.
