= A Very Long Engagement =

2004 film by Jean-Pierre Jeunet

- Theatrical release poster
- Directed by: Jean-Pierre Jeunet
- Screenplay by: Jean-Pierre Jeunet; Guillaume Laurant
- Based on: Un long dimanche de fiançailles by Sébastien Japrisot
- Produced by: Jean-Pierre Jeunet; Francis Boespflug; Bill Gerber; Jean-Louis Monthieux; Fabienne Tsaï
- Starring: Audrey Tautou; Gaspard Ulliel; Marion Cotillard; Dominique Pinon; Chantal Neuwirth; André Dussolier; Ticky Holgado; Jodie Foster
- Narrated by: Florence Thomassin
- Cinematography: Bruno Delbonnel
- Edited by: Hervé Schneid
- Music by: Angelo Badalamenti
- Production companies: 2003 Productions; Warner Bros. France; Tapioca Films; TF1 Films Production
- Distributed by: Warner Bros. Pictures (France); Warner Independent Pictures (United States)
- Release dates: 27 October 2004 (France); 26 November 2004 (United States)
- Running time: 134 minutes
- Countries: France; United States
- Language: French
- Budget: €45 million; (US$58 million)
- Box office: $69.4 million

A Very Long Engagement (French: Un long dimanche de fiançailles, lit. 'A Long Sunday of Engagement') is a 2004 romantic war drama film, co-written and directed by Jean-Pierre Jeunet and starring Audrey Tautou, Gaspard Ulliel and Marion Cotillard. It is a fictional tale about a young woman's desperate search for her fiancé who might have been killed during World War I. It was based on the 1991 novel of the same name by Sébastien Japrisot. The film is a co-production between France and the United States. It was released theatrically in France on 27 October 2004 and in the United States on 26 November 2004.

The film received Academy Award nominations for Best Art Direction and Best Cinematography at the 77th Academy Awards. Marion Cotillard earned the César Award for Best Supporting Actress, while Gaspard Ulliel won the César Award for Most Promising Actor at the 30th César Awards.

== Plot ==
Five French soldiers are convicted of self-mutilation in order to escape military service during World War I. They are condemned to face near-certain death in no man's land between the French and German trench lines. It appears that all of them were killed in a subsequent battle, but Mathilde, the fiancée of one of the soldiers, refuses to give up hope and begins to uncover clues as to what actually took place on the battlefield. She is all the while driven by the constant reminder of what her fiancé had carved into one of the bells of the church near their home, MMM for Manech aime Mathilde (Manech loves Mathilde; a pun on the French word aime, which is pronounced like the letter "M". In the English-language version, this is changed to "Manech's marrying Mathilde").

Along the way, she discovers the brutally corrupt system used by the French government to deal with those who tried to escape the front. She also discovers the stories of the other men who were sentenced to no man's land as a punishment. With the help of a private investigator, Germain Pire, she attempts to find out what happened to her fiancé. The story is told both from the point of view of the fiancée in Paris and the French countryside—mostly Brittany—of the 1920s, and through flashbacks to the battlefield.

Eventually, Mathilde finds out her fiancé is alive, but he suffers from amnesia. Seeing Mathilde, Manech seems to be oblivious of her. At this, Mathilde sits on the garden chair silently watching Manech with tears in her eyes and a smile on her lips.

== Cast ==
- Audrey Tautou as Mathilde Donnay
- Gaspard Ulliel as Manech Langonnet, Mathilde's fiancé
- Dominique Pinon as Sylvain, Mathilde's uncle
- Chantal Neuwirth as Bénédicte, Mathilde's aunt
- Jean-Pierre Becker as Sergeant Daniel Esperanza
- Dominique Bettenfeld as Angel Bassignano
- Clovis Cornillac as Benoît Notre-Dame
- Marion Cotillard as Tina Lombardi
- Jean-Pierre Darroussin as Corporal Benjamin "Biscotte" Gordes
- Julie Depardieu as Véronique Passavant
- Jean-Claude Dreyfus as Major François Lavrouye
- André Dussollier as Pierre-Marie Rouvières
- Ticky Holgado as Germain Pire
- Tchéky Karyo as Captain Etienne Favourier
- Jérôme Kircher as Kléber "Bastoche" Bouquet
- Denis Lavant as Francis "Six-Sous" Gaignard
- Urbain Cancelier as The monk
- Jean-Paul Rouve as The postman
- Michel Vuillermoz as P'tit Louis
- Albert Dupontel as Célestin Poux
- Bouli Lanners as Corporal Urbain Chardolot
- Philippe Duquesne as Favart
- François Levantal as Gaston Thouvenel
- Stéphane Butet as Julien Phillipot
- Thierry Gibault as Lieutenant Benoît Etrangin
- Jodie Foster as Élodie Gordes
- Rufus as The Breton
- Frédérique Bel as A prostitute
- Elina Löwensohn as German woman
- Michel Robin as old man on the battlefield

== Production ==
A Very Long Engagement was filmed in France over an 18-month period, with about 30 French actors, approximately 500 French technicians and more than 2,000 French extras. Right before the film's New York City and Hollywood debut, the film's production company, 2003 Productions, which is one-third owned by Warner Bros. and two-thirds owned by Warner France, was ruled an American production company by a French court, denying the studio $4.8 million in government incentives.

The film had a production budget of €45 million (US$58 million), and earned $69.4 million in theaters worldwide.

Joséphine Japy auditioned for the role of a child in the film. She did not get the role but she credits her encounter with Jean-Pierre Jeunet as being decisive in her desire to become an actress. Following the audition, Jeunet came up to Japy and standing at her height, said: "Joséphine, can I talk to you like an adult? Today, it won't be you, but one day, we'll meet again...". Japy said that Jeunet's words had a real resonance and made her "want to hang on, believe and keep going", and if Jeunet had not taken the time to say that to her that day, she might not be here [talking to the interviewer].

== Reception ==
=== Critical response ===
The film received generally positive reviews from critics. On Rotten Tomatoes, 79% of critics gave the film positive reviews, based on 146 reviews, and an average rating of 7.40/10. The website's critical consensus states, "A well-crafted and visually arresting drama with a touch of whimsy." On Metacritic the film has a weighted average score of 76 out of 100, based on reviews from 39 critics, indicating "generally favorable" reviews.

Peter Travers of Rolling Stone praised "miracle worker" Jean-Pierre Jeunet and called the film "an emotional powerhouse."

Roger Ebert of the Chicago Sun-Times rated the film three and a half stars out of four wrote, "Jeunet brings everything together—his joyously poetic style, the lovable Tautou, a good story worth the telling—into a film that is a series of pleasures stumbling over one another in their haste to delight us."

Manohla Dargis of The New York Times gave a negative review, stating that "Mr. Jeunet shows no interest in animating the characters in his dollhouse world."

=== Awards ===
The film received Academy Award nominations for Best Art Direction and Best Cinematography at the 77th Oscars, losing both to The Aviator. It was not selected as the French submission for the Academy Award for Best Foreign Language Film, in favor of The Chorus. Marion Cotillard won the César Award for Best Supporting Actress for her performance, while Audrey Tautou was nominated for Best Actress.

- 30th César Awards (France)
  - Won: Best Supporting Actress (Marion Cotillard)
  - Won: Best Cinematography (Bruno Delbonnel)
  - Won: Best Costume Design (Madeline Fontaine)
  - Won: Best Production Design (Aline Bonetto)
  - Won: Most Promising Actor (Gaspard Ulliel)
  - Nominated: Best Actress (Audrey Tautou)
  - Nominated: Best Director (Jean-Pierre Jeunet)
  - Nominated: Best Editing (Hervé Schneid)
  - Nominated: Best Film
  - Nominated: Best Music (Angelo Badalamenti)
  - Nominated: Best Sound (Vincent Arnardi, Gérard Hardy and Jean Umansky)
  - Nominated: Best Original Screenplay or Adaptation (Jean-Pierre Jeunet and Guillaume Laurant)
- London's Favourite French Film 2006 (United Kingdom)
  - Won: Best Film
- 77th Academy Awards (USA)
  - Nominated: Best Art Direction (Aline Bonetto)
  - Nominated: Best Cinematography (Bruno Delbonnel)
- BAFTA Awards (UK)
  - Nominated: BAFTA Award for Best Film Not in the English Language
- 10th Critics' Choice Awards (USA)
  - Nominated: Best Foreign-Language Film
- Boston Society of Film Critics Awards
  - Runner-up: Best Foreign Language Film
- Chicago Film Critics Association (USA)
  - Won: Best Foreign Language Film
- Dallas-Fort Worth Film Critics Association (USA)
  - Won: Best Foreign Language Film
  - Placed 9th: Top 10 Films
- Florida Film Critics Circle (USA)
  - Won: Best Foreign Film
- Kansas City Film Critics Circle Awards (USA)
  - Won: Best Foreign Language Film
- Golden Globe Awards (USA)
  - Nominated: Best Foreign Language Film

== See also ==
- List of World War I films
