= Yvan Chiffre =

French director, producer, and stunt coordinator (1936–2016)

- Born: Yvan Lucien Chiffre; 3 March 1936; Rousson, Gard, France
- Died: 27 September 2016 (aged 80); Adissan (Hérault, France)
- Occupations: Film director, film producer, screenwriter, stunt coordinator
- Children: Philippe Chiffre, Romain Chiffre

Yvan Chiffre (3 March 1936 – 27 September 2016) was a French director, producer, and stunt coordinator. He is the father of Philippe Chiffre, Romain Chiffre and the grand father of César Chiffre.

== Biography ==
He was the stunt coordinator of Thunderball and Triple Cross by Terence Young, Is Paris Burning? by René Clément, Z by Costa Gavras, Hotel Paradiso by Peter Glenville.

He was also the official stunt double of Jean Marais and Alain Delon, was stunt man on the Longest Day, and stunt double of Cary Grant in Charade, Sterling Hayden in Poppies Are Also Flowers, Eddie Constantine in Lucky Jo and many others...

He also contributed to major French films like Zorro by Duccio Tessari, La Grande Vadrouille by Gérard Oury, Le Cercle Rouge by Jean-Pierre Melville, and more than 200 others.

In 1992, he published an autobiography A l'ombre des stars, about his stuntman life.

In 2014, he received in Paris the UNESCO prize.

In 2017, the Academy Award, Oscars In Memoriam honors Yvan Chiffre for his life achievement.

== Filmography ==
=== Actor ===
- 1959: Rue des prairies - (uncredited)
- 1961: The Three Musketeers (by Bernard Borderie)
- 1961: Le Miracle des loups (by André Hunebelle) - Un baladin (uncredited)
- 1962: The Longest Day (by Ken Annakin, Andrew Marton, Bernhard Wicki, Gerd Oswald and Darryl F. Zanuck) - Paratrooper (uncredited)
- 1962: The Mysteries of Paris (by André Hunebelle) - Un argousin (uncredited)
- 1962: Le Chevalier de Pardaillan (by Bernard Borderie) - Un garde (uncredited)
- 1962: Your Turn, Darling (by Bernard Borderie)
- 1963: OSS 117 Is Unleashed (by André Hunebelle) - Agent Thibaud
- 1964: Anatomy of a Marriage: My Days with Jean-Marc (by André Cayatte) - Christian
- 1964: Anatomy of a Marriage: My Days with Françoise (by André Cayatte) - Christian
- 1964: The Black Tulip (by Christian-Jaque)
- 1964: Hardi Pardaillan! (by Bernard Borderie) - Yvon
- 1964: Nick Carter va tout casser (by Henri Decoin) - Un homme de main de Li-Hang
- 1964: Une souris chez les hommes (by Jacques Poitrenaud) - Un patineur (uncredited)
- 1964: Fantômas (by André Hunebelle) - Un homme de main de Fantômas (uncredited)
- 1964: Lucky Jo (by Michel Deville) - Un bagarreur au bar du boulevard de la Madeleine (uncredited)
- 1965: Ces dames s'en mêlent (by Raoul André) - Loulou
- 1965: Le Majordome (by Jean Delannoy) - Paulo
- 1965: Furia à Bahia pour OSS 117 (by André Hunebelle) - Un homme de main
- 1965: Coplan FX 18 casse tout (by Riccardo Freda) - Un homme de main (uncredited)
- 1965: Fantômas se déchaîne (by André Hunebelle) - Un homme de Fantômas
- 1966: The Poppy Is Also a Flower (by Terence Young) - (uncredited)
- 1966: Le Solitaire passe à l'attaque (by Ralph Habib)
- 1966: Sale temps pour les mouches (by Guy Lefranc)
- 1966: La Grande Vadrouille (by Gérard Oury)
- 1967: Two Weeks in September (by Serge Bourguignon) - Man on the Motorcycle (uncredited)
- 1968: À tout casser (by John Berry)
- 1968: Les Cracks (by Alex Joffé)
- 1969: Le Clan des Siciliens (by Henri Verneuil) - Un inspecteur (uncredited)
- 1970: Le Temps des loups (by Sergio Gobbi) - L'homme de main du receleur (uncredited)
- 1969: Z (by Costa-Gavras)
- 1969: Borsalino (by Jacques Deray)
- 1970: Le Cercle rouge (by Jean-Pierre Melville) - Un policier
- 1971: Doucement les basses (by Jacques Deray)
- 1971: Le drapeau noir flotte sur la marmite - Bit
- 1973: Défense de savoir - L'equipe
- 1974: The Four Charlots Musketeers (by André Hunebelle) - Un garde du cardinal (uncredited)
- 1974: The Four Charlots Musketeers 2 (by André Hunebelle) - Garde qui louche
- 1974: Borsalino & Co (by Jacques Deray)
- 1974: La moutarde me monte au nez (by Claude Zidi)
- 1974: Lancelot du lac (by Robert Bresson)
- 1975: Zorro (by Duccio Tessari) - Thug (uncredited)
- 1980: Du blues plein la tête (by Hervé Palud) - Le boucher
- 1984: Le fou du roi - Taillevent
- 1984: Cheech & Chong's The Corsican Brothers - Tax collector #1 (final film role)

==== Television ====
- 1965-1966: Thierry la Fronde (série TV) (by Pierre Goutas) - Robert / L'homme au couteau
- 1966: Le Chevalier d'Harmental (feuilleton TV) (by Jean-Pierre Decourt) - Ravanne

=== Director ===
- 1975 : Bons Baisers de Hong Kong
- 1984 : Le Fou du roi
- 1989 : President's target
