= Marie-Laure Dougnac =

French actress

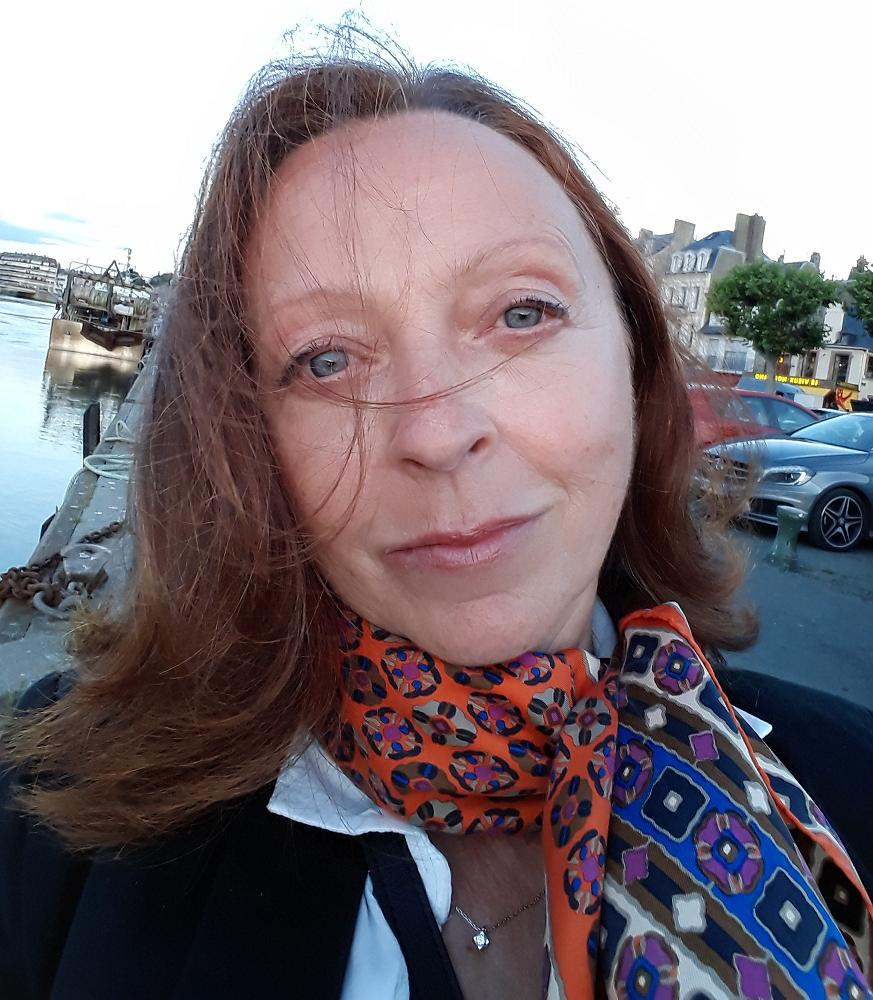
- Born: 1 February 1962 (age 64); Lyon, France
- Occupation: Actress
- Years active: 1983–present

Marie-Laure Dougnac (born 1 February 1962) is a French actress specializing in the dubbing of English films and TV shows into French.

== Acting career ==
Dougnac had a cameo in the short film Things I Like, Things I Don't Like (Foutaises) and she also portrayed Julie Clapet, the butcher's daughter in the Jean-Pierre Jeunet film Delicatessen.

== Theatre ==
- 2000 : La main passe by Georges Feydeau, produced by Gildas Bourdet, Théâtre national de Chaillot, Théâtre Comédia

== Dubbing ==
=== Films ===
- Joey Lauren Adams: Layla Moloney in Big Daddy
- Heather Graham: Alice Loudon in Killing Me Softly (in France, Feu de glace)
- Renee O'Connor: Dr. Jessica Ryan in Boogeyman 2
- Parker Posey: Danica Talos in Blade: Trinity
- KaDee Strickland: Susan Williams in The Grudge
- Liv Tyler:
  - Arwen in The Lord of the Rings
  - Betty Ross in The Incredible Hulk
- Naomi Watts: Eleonor Whitman in The International (in France, L'Enquête)
- Renée Zellweger: Dorothy Boyd in Jerry Maguire
- Catherine Zeta-Jones: Virginia Baker in Entrapment (in France, Haute Voltige)
- Shigeru Muroi: Asako Tsukishima in Whisper of the Heart (in France, Si tu tends l'oreille)

=== Television series ===
- Laura Allen:
  - Lilly Moore-Tyler in The 4400
  - Julia Mallory in Dirt
- Sasha Alexander: Jessie Presser in Wasteland
- Kelly Collins Lintz: Tracy Connelly in Surface
- Kellie Martin: Lucy Knight in ER
- Renee O'Connor: Gabrielle in Xena: Warrior Princess
- Kelly Rowan: Kirsten Cohen in The O.C. (in France, Newport Beach)
- Emma Tate: Carole in Mr. Baby
- Sayuri Uchida: Annie (Ako Hayasaka) / Blue Swallow in Chōjin Sentai Jetman (second voice)
- Ally Walker: Samantha "Sam" Waters in Profiler
