= Pierre François Keraudren =

French scientist and physician

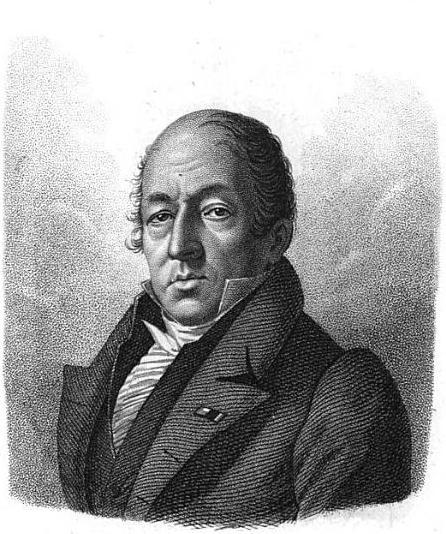
Pierre François Keraudren (1769-1758)

Pierre François Keraudren (15 May 1769 - 16 August 1858) was a scientist and medical doctor in the French Navy. He was a native of Brest.

== Biography ==
From 1813 to 1845 he served as Inspector General to the Health Department of the Navy. Keraudren was a member of the Académie de Médecine, a consulting physician to Louis-Philippe and a member of the Moscow Society of Naturalists. He also belonged to medical, literary and scientific societies of Madrid, Louvain, Bologna, Orléans, Marseille, Toulon and Rochefort. On July 10, 1816 he was knighted in the Ordre de Saint-Michel.

== Honours ==
- Keraudren Island is located west of Australia at 14°56′33″S 124°41′2″E.
- Cape Keraudren in the north-west of Australia was charted in 1801 and is located at 19°57′S 119°46′E at the southern end of Eighty Mile Beach. Keraudren served as the ship's official physician to the 1800–1803 Baudin expedition to Australia.
- Cape Keraudren at the north of Hunter Island in the north-west of Tasmania at 40°23′S 144°47′E.
- The trumpet manucode, a species of birds found in New Guinea, was given the scientific name Manucodia keraudrenii by René-Primevère Lesson and Prosper Garnot in 1826.
- He also appears to be the person after whom the gastropods Oxygyrus keraudrenii (Charles-Alexandre Lesueur, 1817) and Pterotrachea keraudrenii (Fortune Eydoux and Louis François Auguste Souleyet, 1832) were named.

== Works ==
- Réflexions sommaires sur le scorbut, 1804
- Considérations et observations sur la syphilis dégénérée, 1811
- De la fièvre jaune observée aux Antilles [et] sur les vaisseaux du roi, Paris, 1823
- Mémoire sur les causes des maladies des marins, et sur les soins à prendre pour converser leur santé dans les ports et à la mer, 2nd ed., Paris, 1824 (1st ed., 1817)
- Du choléra-morbus de l'Inde ou mordéchi, Paris, 1824
  - Mémoire sur le choléra-morbus de l'Inde, Baillière, Paris, 1831
  - On the cholera morbus of India, The Lancet Office, London, 1831—"The most rational, unexaggerated, and impartial monograph concerning the Indian Cholera, yet presented to the public" (from the title page)

== See also ==
- European and American voyages of scientific exploration
