= Keraudren Island =

Island in Western Australia

Coordinates: 14°56′S 124°39′E

Location of Keraudren Island

Keraudren Island is an island off the coast of the Kimberley region of Western Australia in the Indian Ocean.

The island lies approximately 23 kilometres (14 mi) off-shore from Cape Wellington in the Prince Regent National Park. The island is part of the Darcole Islands and has a size of approximately 120 hectares (297 acres). The island is surrounded by Hedley Island to the West and Whitley island to the East.

It was named after Pierre François Keraudren.
