= Claudie Ossard =

French film producer (born 1943)

- Born: Marie-Claude Ossard; 16 December 1943 (age 81); Paris, France
- Occupation: Film producer

Marie-Claude Ossard (French pronunciation: [klodi ɔsaʁ]; born 16 December 1943 in Paris) is a French film producer.

== Selected filmography ==
Film
Year	Title	Role	Notes
2009	Coco Chanel & Igor Stravinsky		
2009	Ricky		
2006	Paris, je t'aime		
2003	Laisse tes mains sur mes hanches	The blond girl in the car	
2001	Amélie		
1998	Que la lumière soit		
1995	The City of Lost Children		
1993	Arizona Dream		
1991	Delicatessen		
1989	Marquis		
1986	Charlotte for Ever		
1986	Betty Blue		
1981	Diva		
1980	Public Telephone		
