= Valérie Perrin =

French novelist and screenwriter (born 1967)

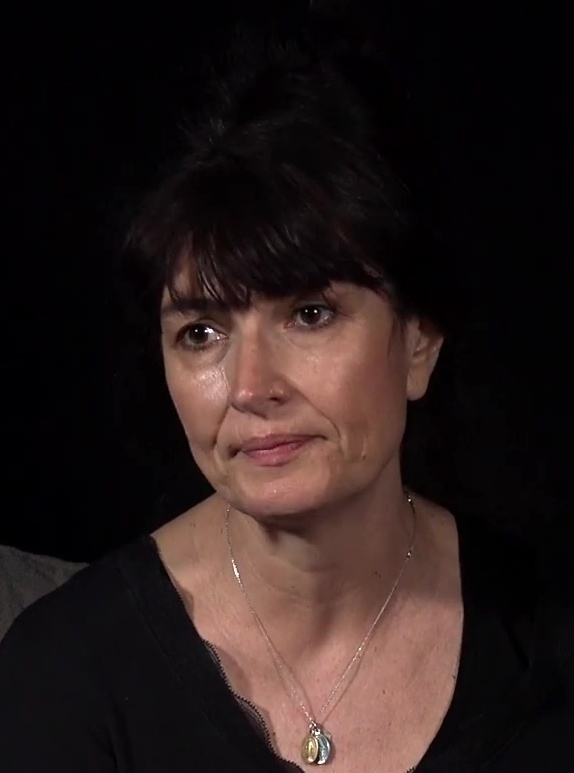
- Born: January 19, 1967 (age 59) Remiremont, France
- Occupation: Novelist, screenwriter, photographer
- Notable works: Les Oubliés du dimanche (2015), Changer l'eau des fleurs (2018)
- Notable awards: Bookseller's Choice Award (2015); Prix du premier roman de Chambéry (2016); Prix Maison de la Presse (2018); Paperback Readers Prize (2020)
- Spouse: Claude Lelouch (m. 2023)

Valérie Perrin (born 19 January 1967, in Remiremont) is a French novelist, screenwriter, and photographer. She is best known as the author of the novels Les Oubliés du dimanche (2015), and Changer l'eau des fleurs (2018), and for screenwriting on the films Salaud, on t'aime (2014), Un plus une (2015), and Everyone's Life (2017). Her works have been translated into over 30 languages.

== Life and career ==
Perrin was born 19 January 1967 in Remiremont, France, and grew up in Burgundy in a family of footballers. She moved to Paris in 1986, working odd jobs before settling with Claude Lelouch, whom she had met in 2006 after writing him a letter. She began screenwriting when she collaborated with Lelouch for 2014 French drama Salaud, on t'aime. She would go on to collaborate with him for the screenplays of Un plus une (2015) and Everyone's Life (2017).

After having worked on Salaud, on t'aime, Perrin published her first novel Les Oubliés du dimanche, published by Éditions Albin Michel in 2015 and Le Livre de Poche in 2017. The book was a success, being awarded a Booksellers Choice Award, a Chronos Award, the National Lion's Prize for Literature, the Prix du Premier Roman in 2016.

Perrin's following novel, Changer l'eau des fleurs, was published in 2018 by Albin Michel and Les Livres de Poche in 2019. In 2020, it was translated into English by Hildegarde Serle for Europa Editions as Fresh Water for Flowers, where the novel became an international success. Her novel Trois, was published in 2021. She married Lelouch in a civil ceremony in Paris in 2023.

== Literary work ==
=== Novels ===
- Les Oubliés du dimanche, Éditions Albin Michel (2015), Le Livre de Poche (2017), Europa Editions (2023)
- Changer l'eau des fleurs, Éditions Albin Michel (2018), Les Livres de Poche (2019), Europa Editions (2020)
- Trois, Éditions Albin Michel (2021), Les Livres de Poche (2022), Europa Editions (2022)
- Tata, Edition Albin Michel (2024)

=== Short stories ===
- 24 hours together (with Wilfried N'sondé and Brigitte Giraud), Editións ActuSF, 2019

=== Screenplays ===
- Salaud, on t'aime (2014)
- Un plus une (2015)
- Everyone's Life (2017)

== Awards ==
- Forgotten on Sunday
  - National Lion's Prize for Literature, 2016
  - Chronos award, 2016
  - Poulet-Malassis Prize, 2016
- Fresh Water for Flowers
  - Maison de la Presse, 2018
  - Les Livres de Poche Reader's Prize, 2019
