= Cape Keraudren =

Headland in Western Australia

Coordinates: 19°57′S 119°46′E

Time-lapse of sunset, moonset and sunrise at Cape Keraudren, Western Australia, September 2022

Cape Keraudren is a coastal headland on the northern coast of Western Australia. The rocky cape forms the western end of Eighty Mile Beach, and the eastern end of the Pilbara Coast. The waters around the cape have coral reefs, sponge gardens, and seaweed and seagrass beds.

== Geography ==
The cape is at the southwestern end of Eighty Mile Beach Marine Park. Cape Keraudren Coastal Reserve, immediately south of the cape, is managed by the local shire, and has campsites, toilets, rubbish bins and an on-site ranger.

== History ==
The cape is culturally significant to the local Ngarla people, the cape's traditional owners.

The cape is named for Pierre François Keraudren (1769–1858), a scientist and physician in the French Navy. He was the official physician to the Baudin expedition to Australia, which charted the cape in 1801.

The cape is the northern end of the rabbit-proof fence, built between 1901 and 1907 across Western Australia.
