= Delicatessen (1991 film) =

- Original theatrical poster
- Directed by: Jean-Pierre Jeunet; Marc Caro
- Written by: Gilles Adrien; Marc Caro; Jean-Pierre Jeunet
- Produced by: Claudie Ossard
- Starring: Dominique Pinon; Marie-Laure Dougnac; Jean-Claude Dreyfus; Karin Viard; Rufus; Ticky Holgado; Sylvie Laguna; Jacques Mathou; Jean-Francois Perrier; Anne-Marie Pisani; Howard Vernon; Chick Ortega
- Cinematography: Darius Khondji
- Edited by: Hervé Schneid
- Music by: Carlos d'Alessio
- Production companies: UGC; Hachette Première; Constellation; Victoires Productions
- Distributed by: UGC Distribution
- Release date: April 17, 1991 (France)
- Running time: 99 minutes
- Country: France
- Language: French
- Budget: $3.8 million
- Box office: $12.4 million

Delicatessen is a 1991 French post-apocalyptic black comedy film directed by Jean-Pierre Jeunet and Marc Caro, starring Dominique Pinon, Marie-Laure Dougnac, and Jean-Claude Dreyfus. It was released in North America as "presented by Terry Gilliam."

== Plot ==
In a dilapidated apartment building in post-apocalyptic France, food is in short supply and grain is used as currency. On the ground floor is a butcher's shop, run by the landlord, Clapet, who posts job opportunities in the newspaper.

Following the murder of the last worker, unemployed circus clown Louison applies for the vacant position. Louison proves to be a superb worker with a spectacular trick knife, and the butcher is reluctant to kill him too quickly. During Louison's routine maintenance, he acquires a package dropped by a mailman. Louison delivers the package to Clapet's daughter, Julie, who says the package contains confections and invites him to join her that evening. Louison and Julie's relationship blossoms into romance. At the same time, several of the tenants fall under Louison's boyish charms, worrying others who are more anxious for their own safety should they require meat.

Clapet tells apartment tenant Marcel Tapioca that his rent is late and he must give up his mother-in-law as payment. That evening, Julie begs her father to let Louison go, knowing that Clapet is killing tenants for meat. She goes to her apartment, unwraps a newspaper in her refrigerator and sees an article about the Troglodytes, a group of vegetarian rebels who live underground. Julie descends into the sewers to make contact with the feared Troglodytes, whom she persuades to help rescue Louison.

Following the apparent butchering of Tapioca's mother-in-law, the Troglodistes go through the sewer pipes and attempt to capture Louison, but end up mistakenly capturing tenant Mademoiselle Plusse instead. Meanwhile, as Julie and Louison watch television, Clapet ascends to the roof, shaking the television antenna to lure Louison into going up to fix it. Attacking Louison with a cleaver, Clapet's attempt to kill him is foiled by an unexpected electrical explosion in one of the apartments.

Clapet, along with some tenants, storms Louison's room in another attempt to murder him. Louison and Julie take refuge in a bathroom and flood it, floor to ceiling, until Clapet opens the door, releasing the flood and washing the attackers away. Mademoiselle Plusse escapes the sewers, finds Louison's boomerang knife, and gives it to Clapet. Clapet throws the knife towards Louison, but inadvertently kills himself.

Louison and Julie play music together on the roof of the now peaceful apartment building, and the butcher's shop closed for good.

== Cast ==
- Pascal Benezech as an Attempted Escapee
- Dominique Pinon as Louison
- Marie-Laure Dougnac as Julie Clapet
- Jean-Claude Dreyfus as Clapet
- Karin Viard as Mademoiselle Plusse
- Ticky Holgado as Marcel Tapioca
- Anne-Marie Pisani as Tapioca's Wife
- Boban Janevski and Mikaël Todde as the Tapioca Children
- Edith Ker as Grandmother
- Rufus as Robert Kube
- Jacques Mathou as Roger
- Howard Vernon as Frog Man
- Chick Ortega as The Postman
- Silvie Laguna as Aurore Interligator
- Jean-François Perrier as Georges Interligator
- Patrick Paroux as Puk
- Maurice Lamy as Pank
- Marc Caro as Fox
- Eric Averlant as Tourneur
- Dominique Bettenfeld, Jean-Luc Caron, Bernard Flavien, Bernard Flavien, David Defever, Raymond Forestier, Robert Baud as the Troglodistes
- Clara, a chimpanzee, as Livingstone

== Reception ==
The film was received well critically. Variety called it "a zany little film that's a startling and clever debut." Empire called it a "fair bet for cultdom, a lot more likeable than its subject matter suggests, and simply essential viewing for vegetarians". Inverse described the movie as having "striking visual aesthetic inspired by the monochrome photography of French-Hungarian photographer Brassaï, and the fantasy films of Terry Gilliam".

Not all reviews were positive, however, with Janet Maslin of The New York Times saying "its last half-hour is devoted chiefly to letting the characters wreck the sets, and quite literally becomes a washout when the bathtub overflows." Caryn James, also of The New York Times, was more positive; she wrote, "at times the film becomes too whimsical for its own good...Despite these minor flaws, as the film meanders from one set piece to another it makes good use of its directors' experience with short video forms".

Although Delicatessen examines the resistance movement in German-occupied Europe, few film critics commented on this theme upon its initial release.

Review aggregator Rotten Tomatoes gave it an approval rating of 90% from a total of 58 reviews with an average rating of 7.8/10. The website's critical consensus reads, "Director Jean-Pierre Jeunet deftly combines horror, sci-fi, and humor in Delicatessen, a morbid comedy set in a visually ravishing futuristic dystopia." Metacritic gave it 66 out of 100 out of a total of 17 reviews, indicating "generally favorable reviews".

=== Accolades ===
The film won several prestigious European film awards. At the César Awards, it won for Best Editing, Best Debut, Best Production Design, and Best Original Screenplay or Adaptation. It won for Best Set Design at the European Film Awards; the Audience Jury Award at Fantasporto; Best Foreign Film at the Guild of German Art House Cinemas; and Best Director, Best Actor, Best Original Soundtrack, and the Prize of Catalan Screenwriter's Critic and Writer's Association at the Sitges Film Festival. At the Tokyo International Film Festival, it won the Gold Award. The film was nominated for the Grand Prix of the Belgian Syndicate of Cinema Critics. At the BAFTA Awards, it was nominated for Best Film Not in the English Language.

== See also ==
- List of cult films
