= Diane Bertrand =

French film director

- Born: 20 November 1951 (age 74)
- Occupations: Film director Screenwriter children's book writer
- Years active: 1999–present

Diane Bertrand (born 20 November 1951) is a French film director and screenwriter. Her film Un samedi sur la terre was screened in the Un Certain Regard section at the 1996 Cannes Film Festival.

== Selected filmography ==
- Charcuterie fine: Clin d'oeil au long métrage de Jeunet et Caro 'Delicatessen' (1991)
- 25 décembre 58, 10h36 (1991)
- Un samedi sur la terre (1996)
- L'occasionnelle (1999)
- Retour de flamme (2002)
- L'Annulaire (2005)
- Baby Blues (2008)
