= Marc Caro =

French filmmaker and cartoonist

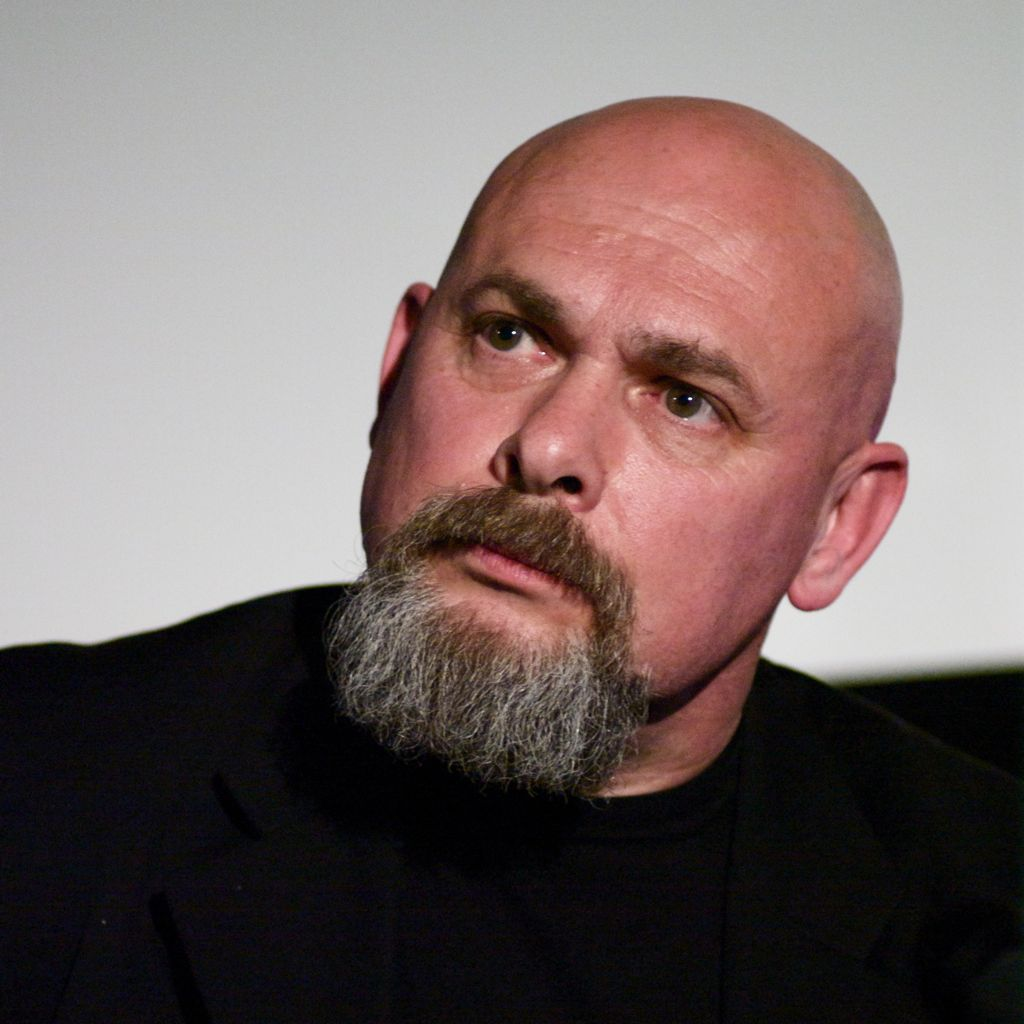
- Caro at Sci-Fi-London in 2009
- Born: 2 April 1956 (age 70); Nantes, France
- Occupations: Film director; screenwriter; comics artist
- Notable work: Delicatessen; The City of Lost Children

Marc Caro (born 2 April 1956) is a French filmmaker and comics artist, best known for his projects with Jean-Pierre Jeunet.

== Biography ==
Marc Caro was born in Nantes, the native town of Jules Verne, who made a great impact on him, influenced his love for science fiction and his artistic style. During the 1970s he worked as an editor and designer at Métal hurlant, drew comics for L'Écho des savanes and Fluide Glacial along with Gilles Adrien who would also join Caro on his movie projects.

=== Caro-Jeunet ===
In 1974 Caro met and befriended Jean-Pierre Jeunet at the Annecy International Animated Film Festival which led to a long-lasting collaboration. Together they directed two animated shorts, L'évasion (The Escape, 1978) and Le manège (The Carousel, 1980) which was awarded the César Award for Best Animated Short Film at the 6th César Awards in 1981. Same year they wrote and co-directed a short art film Le Bunker de la dernière rafale (The Bunker of the Last Gunshots) where the pair also worked as cinematographers, editors, set decorators, costume designers, even actors. Caro also produced shorts, ads and music clips on his own.

In 1991 they directed their first feature film, a dark comedy Delicatessen which launched their careers: the film won the Gold Hugo at the Chicago International Film Festival and Tokyo Gold Prize at the Tokyo International Film Festival in 1991, César Awards for Best Debut and Best Writing at the 17th César Awards (1992) and the Best Director award at the Sitges Film Festival (1993). As Caro described their working process,

"Jean-Pierre handles direction in the traditional sense of the word, that is, the direction of the actors, etc., while I do the artistic direction. Beyond that, in the day-to-day workings of the shoot of preproduction, it's obviously much more of a mixture. We write together, film together, edit together. According to each of our specialties, sometimes we'll be drawn to what we do best. There's a real complicity between us.

The success of Delicatessen allowed them to return to their early project — a science fantasy film, The City of Lost Children, which they conceived in the early 1980s, but were not able to produce due to the lack of funding. It was released in 1995 and entered the 1995 Cannes Film Festival. The friends were then suggested to direct the fourth Alien installment, Alien Resurrection, and while Jeunet agreed, Caro refused to work on a film over which he lacked creative control, although he was persuaded to spend three weeks in Hollywood working on costume and set design. This movie marked the end of their creative partnership.

=== Solo career ===
During the next 10 years Caro contributed to various projects as an art director, character designer and actor, often collaborating with Jan Kounen on his films. In 2008 he released Dante 01, his first feature film as a solo director which went almost unnoticed. In 2009 he directed a 53-minute documentary Astroboy à Roboland based on the Astro Boy franchise. He returned to directing only in 2018 with a 5-minute short Loop.

In 2011 he became one of the initiators of the joined French-Japanese 3D animated movie Windwalkers: Chronicle of the 34th Horde working as an art director and visual effects supervisor, with Kounen attached as a director. The movie was based on the top-selling French novel La Horde du Contrevent by Alain Damasio and received a budget of €18 million ($23.4 million), but after American distributors requested to "marvelise" the script which they found "indigestible and too complicated", Caro and Kounen left the project which was eventually frozen in 2015.

== Filmography ==
Year	Title	Director	Writer	Storyboard
1978	L'évasion	Yes	No	No
1981	The Bunker of the Last Gunshots	Yes	No	No
1984	Pas de repos pour Billy Brakko	No	Yes	No
1991	Delicatessen	Yes	Yes	Yes
1995	The City of Lost Children	Yes	Yes	Yes
1997	Alien: Resurrection	No	No	Yes
2008	Dante 01	Yes	Yes	No
