= Jean-Pierre Jeunet =

French filmmaker

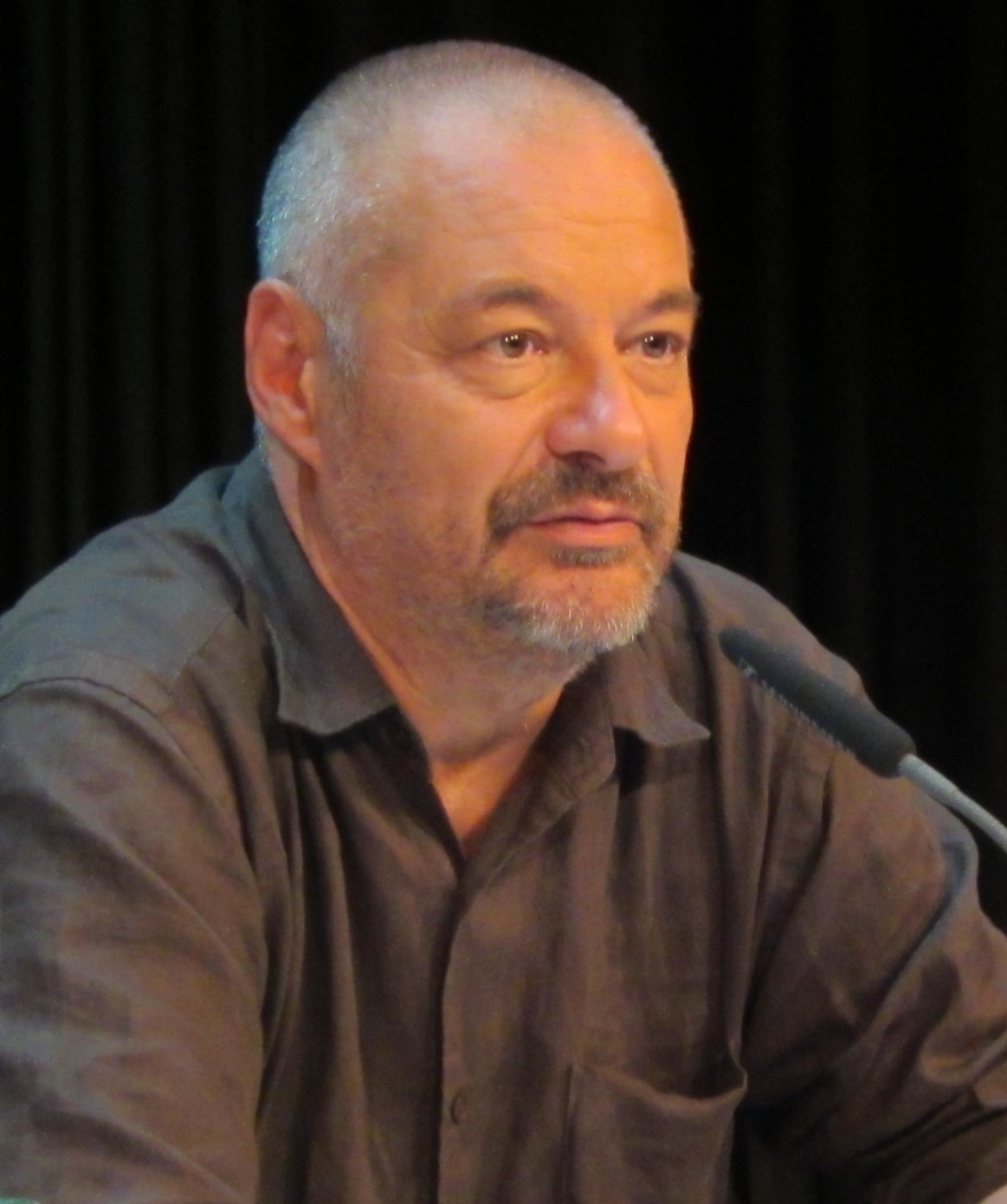
- Jeunet in 2014
- Born: 3 September 1953 (age 73); Roanne, Loire, France
- Occupations: Director; screenwriter; producer
- Years active: 1978–present
- Notable work: Delicatessen; The City of Lost Children; Amélie; A Very Long Engagement
- Spouse: Liza Sullivan

Jean-Pierre Jeunet (French: [ʒɑ̃ pjɛʁ ʒœnɛ]; born 3 September 1953) is a French director and screenwriter.

Jeunet debuted as a director with the 1991 black comedy Delicatessen, collaborating with Marc Caro. Jeunet then co-wrote and -directed with Caro again on The City of Lost Children (1995). His work with science fiction and horror led him to direct Alien Resurrection (1997), the fourth film in the Alien film series and his first and thus far only American film. In 2001, Jeunet achieved his biggest success with Amélie, which won him international acclaim; the film reached BBC's 100 Greatest Films of the 21st Century.

== Life and career ==
Jean-Pierre Jeunet was born in Roanne, France. He bought his first camera at the age of 17 and made short films while studying animation at Cinémation Studios. He befriended Marc Caro, a designer and comic book artist who became his longtime collaborator and co-director. They met at an animation festival in Annecy in the 1970s.

Together, Jeunet and Caro directed award-winning animations. Their first live-action film was The Bunker of the Last Gunshots (1981), a short film about soldiers in a bleak futuristic world. Jeunet also directed numerous advertisements and music videos, such as Jean-Michel Jarre's Zoolook (together with Caro).

Jeunet's films often resonate with the late twentieth-century French film movement cinéma du look and allude to themes and aesthetics involving German expressionism, French poetic realism, and the French New Wave.

Jeunet and Caro's first feature film was Delicatessen (1991), a melancholy comedy set in a famine-plagued post-apocalyptic world, in which an apartment building above a delicatessen is ruled by a butcher who kills people in order to feed his tenants.

They next made The City of Lost Children (1995), a dark, multi-layered fantasy film about a mad scientist who steals children's dreams so that he can live indefinitely. The success of The City of Lost Children led to an invitation to direct the fourth film in the Alien series, Alien Resurrection (1997). This is where Jeunet and Caro ended up going their separate ways, as Jeunet believed this to be an amazing opportunity whereas Caro was not interested in working on a big-budget Hollywood movie on which he would lack creative control. Caro ended up assisting for a few weeks with costumes and set design, but then he decided to start a solo career in illustration and computer graphics.

Jeunet directed Amélie (2001), the story of a woman who takes pleasure in doing good deeds but has trouble finding love herself, which starred Audrey Tautou. Amélie was a huge critical and commercial success worldwide and was nominated for several Academy Awards. For his work on the film, Jeunet won a European Film Award for Best Director.

In 2004, Jeunet released A Very Long Engagement, an adaptation of the novel by Sébastien Japrisot. The film, starring Audrey Tautou and Jodie Foster, chronicled a woman's search for her missing lover after World War I.

In 2005 Jean-Pierre Jeunet was involved in the creation of a detailed history project about the life of French aviator Louis Blériot. After a year Jeunet felt the movie was too close in historic timeline to A Very Long Engagement and the project was abandoned.

In 2009, he released Micmacs, which is about a man and his friends who come up with an intricate and original plan to destroy two big weapons manufacturers.

Jeunet has also directed numerous commercials, including a 2'25" film for Chanel N° 5 featuring his frequent collaborator Audrey Tautou.

In 2013, Jeunet released The Young and Prodigious T. S. Spivet, an adaptation of Reif Larsen's book The Selected Works of T.S. Spivet that starred Kyle Catlett.

In 2016, Jeunet and Romain Segaud co-directed the three-minute stop-motion animation film Deux escargots s'en vont, based on a poem by Jacques Prévert.

Since his last release, Jeunet has tried to get other projects funded but has found it impossible to find investors willing to take a risk on his quirky films. He stated in 2019 that he may go to Netflix "as a last resort", and indeed his next film, Bigbug, was released by the streaming video company in 2022.

== Filmography ==
=== Feature film ===
Year	English Title	Original Title	Director	Writer	Notes
1991	Delicatessen		Yes	Yes	Co-directed with Marc Caro
1995	The City of Lost Children	La Cité des enfants perdus	Yes	Yes	Co-directed with Marc Caro
1997	Alien Resurrection		Yes	No	
2001	Amélie	Le Fabuleux Destin d'Amélie Poulain	Yes	Story	
2004	A Very Long Engagement	Un long dimanche de fiançailles	Yes	Yes	Also producer
2009	Micmacs	MicMacs à tire-larigot	Yes	Yes	Also producer
2013	The Young and Prodigious T. S. Spivet		Yes	Yes	Also producer
2015	Casanova		Yes	No	Also producer
2022	Bigbug		Yes	Yes	
2026	Violette	Changer l'eau des fleurs	Yes	Yes	Post-production

=== Short film ===
Year	Title	Director	Writer	Producer	Notes
1983	No Rest for Billy Brakko (Pas de repos pour Billy Brakko)	Yes	Yes	No	Also editor
1989	Things I Like, Things I Don't Like (Foutaises)	Yes	Yes	No	Also editor
2016	Deux escargots s'en vont	Yes	Yes	Yes	Co-directed with Romain Segaud

=== Music video ===
- 1984: La Fille aux bas nylon by Julien Clerc
- 1985: Zoolook by Jean-Michel Jarre, with Marc Caro
- 1987: Tombé pour la France
- 1987: Hélène by Julien Clerc
- 1988: Souvenez-vous de nous by Claudia Phillips
- 1989: Cache ta joie by Claudia Phillips
- 1991: L'Autre Joue by Lio
- 2017: Pourvu by Gauvain Sers

=== Appearances ===
- 1981: Le Bunker de la dernière rafale
- 1983: Pas de repos pour Billy Brakko
- 2015: Institut Lumière remake, by Martin Scorsese (short film)

== Awards and nominations ==
Academy Awards

Year	Category	Title	Result
2001	Best Foreign Language Film	Amélie	Nominated
2001	Best Original Screenplay	Amélie	Nominated

César Awards

Year	Category	Title	Result
1981	Best Animated Short	Le Manège	Won
1991	Best Animated Short	Foutaises	Won
1992	Best Debut	Delicatessen	Won
1992	Best Original Screenplay or Adaptation	Delicatessen	Won
2001	Best Film	Amélie	Won
2001	Best Director	Amélie	Won
2001	Best Original Screenplay or Adaptation	Amélie	Nominated
2004	Best Film	A Very Long Engagement	Nominated
2004	Best Director	A Very Long Engagement	Nominated
2004	Best Original Screenplay or Adaptation	A Very Long Engagement	Nominated

European Film Awards

Year	Category	Title	Result
1991	Best Film	Delicatessen	Nominated
2001	Best Film	Amélie	Won
2001	Best Director	Amélie	Won
2001	Best European Film	Amélie	Won
2005	Best Director	A Very Long Engagement	Nominated

Edgar Awards

Year	Category	Title	Result
2005	Best Scenery	Amélie	Won

Awards and nominations received by Jeunet's films

Year	Title	Academy Awards		BAFTA Awards		Golden Globe Awards		César Awards	
Year	Title	Nominations	Wins	Nominations	Wins	Nominations	Wins	Nominations	Wins
1991	Delicatessen			1				10	4
1995	The City of Lost Children							4	1
2001	Amélie	5		9	2	1		13	4
2004	A Very Long Engagement	2		1		1		12	5
2009	Micmacs							3	
2013	The Young and Prodigious T.S. Spivet							3	1
Total		7		11	2	2		45	15

== Decorations ==
- Commander of the Order of Arts and Letters (2016)
