= List of Academy Award winners and nominees from France =

This is a list of French Academy Award winners and nominees. This list details the performances of French actors, actresses, and films that have either been submitted or nominated for, or have won, an Academy Award (The Oscars). This list is current as of the 96th Academy Awards ceremony held on March 10, 2024.

== Best Actor ==
=== Leading ===
Year	Winner	Title	Status	Milestone / Notes
1929	Maurice Chevalier	The Big Pond	Nominated	First French actor to be nominated for Best Actor.
1930	Maurice Chevalier	The Love Parade	Nominated	
1937	Charles Boyer	Maria Walewska	Nominated	
1938	Charles Boyer	Algiers	Nominated	
1944	Charles Boyer	Gaslight	Nominated	
1961	Charles Boyer	Fanny	Nominated	Most Academy Award nominations – 4 nominations for Best Actor.
1987	Max Von Sydow	Pelle the Conqueror	Nominated	Von Sydow was a Swedish born actor who acquired the French citizenship in 2002.
1990	Gérard Depardieu	Cyrano de Bergerac	Nominated	First actor to be nominated for a French-speaking role.
2007	George Clooney	Michael Clayton	Nominated	Clooney is an American born actor who acquired the French citizenship in 2025.
2009	George Clooney	Up in the Air	Nominated	
2011	George Clooney	The Descendants	Nominated	
2011	Jean Dujardin	The Artist	Won	First French actor to win Best Actor.
2017	Timothée Chalamet	Call Me by Your Name	Nominated	Chalamet is a French-American actor born in the United States. At age 22, it made him the third-youngest Best Actor nominee.
2024	Timothée Chalamet	A Complete Unknown	Nominated	
2025	Timothée Chalamet	Marty Supreme	Nominated	

=== Supporting ===
Year	Winner	Title	Status	Milestone / Notes
2005	George Clooney	Syriana	Won	
2011	Max Von Sydow	Extremely Loud & Incredibly Close	Nominated	

== Best Actress ==
=== Leading ===
Year	Winner	Film	Status	Milestone / Notes
1934	Claudette Colbert	It Happened One Night	Won	French-born American actress. First French actress to be nominated and win Best Actress.
1935	Claudette Colbert	Private Worlds	Nominated	First French actress to receive more than one Academy Award nomination.
1944	Claudette Colbert	Since You Went Away	Nominated	Most Academy Award nominations – 3 nominations for Best Actress.
1953	Leslie Caron	Lili	Nominated	
1959	Simone Signoret	Room at the Top	Won	Second French actress to win Best Actress.
1963	Leslie Caron	The L-Shaped Room	Nominated	Second French actress to receive more than one nomination – 2 nominations for Best Actress.
1965	Simone Signoret	Ship of Fools	Nominated	Third French actress to receive more than one nomination.
1966	Anouk Aimée	A Man and a Woman	Nominated	First actress to be nominated for a French-speaking role.
1975	Isabelle Adjani	The Story of Adele H.	Nominated	Second actress to be nominated for a French-speaking role.
1976	Marie-Christine Barrault	Cousin, cousine	Nominated	
1989	Isabelle Adjani	Camille Claudel	Nominated	Fourth French actress to receive more than one nomination – 2 nominations for Best Actress. The first to be nominated for two French-speaking roles.
1992	Catherine Deneuve	Indochine	Nominated	
2000	Juliette Binoche	Chocolat	Nominated	First and only French actress to be nominated for both Leading and Supporting categories. Fifth French actress to receive more than one nomination.
2008	Marion Cotillard	La Vie en Rose	Won	First actress to win for a French-speaking role. Third French actress to win Best Actress.
2012	Emmanuelle Riva	Amour	Nominated	Oldest Best Actress nominee in the history.
2014	Marion Cotillard	Two Days, One Night	Nominated	Sixth French actress to receive more than one nomination, the second to be nominated for two French-speaking roles and the first to be nominated for a Belgian film.
2016	Isabelle Huppert	Elle	Nominated	

=== Supporting ===
Year	Winner	Title	Status	Milestone / Notes
1952	Colette Marchand	Moulin Rouge	Nominated	First French actress to be nominated for Best Supporting Actress.
1964	Lila Kedrova	Zorba the Greek	Won	Kedrova was a Russian-born French actress.
1966	Jocelyne LaGarde	Hawaii	Nominated	As a Tahitian, LaGarde was the first indigenous person to be nominated in any acting category.
1996	Juliette Binoche	The English Patient	Won	
2011	Bérénice Bejo	The Artist	Nominated	Bejo is a French-Argentine actress born in Argentina.

== Best Animated Feature ==
This list focuses on French-born directors and producers.

Year	Winner	Title	Status	Milestone / Notes
2003	Sylvain Chomet	The Triplets of Belleville	Nominated	
2007	Vincent Paronnaud; Marjane Satrapi	Persepolis	Nominated	Satrapi was born in Iran.
2010	Sylvain Chomet	The Illusionist	Nominated	
2011	Alain Gagnol; Jean-Loup Felicioli	A Cat in Paris	Nominated	
2013	Pierre Coffin	Despicable Me 2	Nominated	Shared with Chris Renaud & Chris Meledandri
2013	Didier Brunner; Benjamin Renner	Ernest & Celestine	Nominated	
2019	Jérémy Clapin; Marc du Pontavice	I Lost My Body	Nominated	
2021	Charlotte De La Gournerie	Flee	Nominated	Shared with Jonas Poher Rasmussen, Monica Hellström, & Signe Byrge Sørensen.
2024	Ron Dyens	Flow	Won	Shared with Gints Zilbalodis, Matīss Kaža, and Gregory Zalcman
2025	Ugo Bienvenu; Félix de Givry; Sophie Mas	Arco	Nominated	Shared with Natalie Portman
2025	Maïlys Vallade; Liane-Cho Han; Henri Magalon	Little Amélie or the Character of Rain	Nominated	Shared with Nidia Santiago

== Best Production Design ==
This list focuses on French-born art directors and set decorators.

Year	Name	Title	Status	Milestone / Notes
1931	Lazare Meerson	À Nous la Liberté	Nominated	Meerson was a Russian-born French and English film art director.
1951	Jean d'Eaubonne	La Ronde	Nominated	
1952	Marcel Vertès	Moulin Rouge	Won	Shared with Paul Sheriff
1954	Max Ophüls	Le Plaisir	Nominated	Ophüls was a German-born French.
1960	Alexandre Trauner	The Apartment	Won	Nominated with Edward G. Boyle.
1962	Léon Barsacq; Gabriel Béchir	The Longest Day	Nominated	Shared with Ted Haworth and Vincent Korda
1964	Raphaël Bretton	Hush... Hush, Sweet Charlotte	Nominated	Shared with William Glasgow.
1966	Marc Frédérix; Pierre Guffroy	Is Paris Burning?	Nominated	Nominated with Willy Holt.
1969	Raphaël Bretton	Hello, Dolly!	Won	Shared with John DeCuir, Jack Martin Smith, Herman A. Blumenthal, Walter M. Scott, and George James Hopkins.
1970	Pierre-Louis Thévenet	Patton	Won	Shared with Urie McCleary, Gil Parrondo, and Antonio Mateos.
1972	Raphaël Bretton	The Poseidon Adventure	Nominated	Shared with William J. Creber.
1974	Raphaël Bretton	The Towering Inferno	Nominated	Shared with William J. Creber, and Ward Preston.
1975	Alexandre Trauner	The Man Who Would Be King	Nominated	Nominated with Tony Inglis, and Peter James.
1980	Pierre Guffroy	Tess	Won	Nominated with Jack Stephens.
1988	Gérard James	Dangerous Liaisons	Won	Shared with Stuart Craig
1990	Jacques Rouxel	Cyrano de Bergerac	Nominated	Nominated with Ezio Frigerio.
1996	Philippe Turlure	Evita	Nominated	Nominated with Brian Morris.
2000	Françoise Benoît-Fresco; Jean Rabasse	Vatel	Nominated	
2001	Aline Bonetto; Marie-Laure Valla	Amélie	Nominated	
2004	Aline Bonetto	A Very Long Engagement	Nominated	
2011	Anne Seibel; Hélène Dubreuil	Midnight in Paris	Nominated	

== Best Cinematography ==
This list focuses on French-born cinematographers.

Year	Winner	Title	Status	Milestone / Notes
1939	Georges Périnal	The Four Feathers	Nominated	Shared with Osmond Borradaile.
1940	Georges Périnal	The Thief of Bagdad	Won	First French cinematographer to win Best Cinematography. First French cinematographer to receive more than one Academy Award nomination.
1953	Henri Alekan	Roman Holiday	Nominated	Shared with Franz Planer.
1953	Joseph C. Brun	Martin Luther	Nominated	
1962	Jean Bourgoin; Walter Wottitz	The Longest Day	Won	
1966	Marcel Grignon	Is Paris Burning?	Nominated	
1980	Ghislain Cloquet	Tess	Won	Cloquet was a Belgian-born French cinematographer.
1990	Philippe Rousselot	Henry & June	Nominated	
1992	Philippe Rousselot	A River Runs Through It	Won	
1992	Robert Fraisse	The Lover	Nominated	
1996	Darius Khondji	Evita	Nominated	Khondji is an Iranian-French cinematographer.
2001	Bruno Delbonnel	Amélie	Nominated	
2004	Bruno Delbonnel	A Very Long Engagement	Nominated	
2009	Bruno Delbonnel	Harry Potter and the Half-Blood Prince	Nominated	
2011	Guillaume Schiffman	The Artist	Nominated	
2013	Philippe Le Sourd	The Grandmaster	Nominated	
2013	Bruno Delbonnel	Inside Llewyn Davis	Nominated	
2017	Bruno Delbonnel	Darkest Hour	Nominated	
2021	Bruno Delbonnel	The Tragedy of Macbeth	Nominated	Sixth nomination.
2022	Darius Khondji	Bardo, False Chronicle of a Handful of Truths	Nominated	
2024	Paul Guilhaume	Emilia Pérez	Nominated	
2025	Darius Khondji	Marty Supreme	Nominated	

== Best Costume Design ==
This list focuses on French-born costume designers.

Year	Winner	Title	Status	Milestone / Notes
1950	Jean Louis	Born Yesterday	Nominated	
1952	Jean Louis	Affair in Trinidad	Nominated	
1952	Marcel Vertès	Moulin Rouge	Won	Vertès was a French costume designer and illustrator of Hungarian origins.
1953	Jean Louis	From Here to Eternity	Nominated	
1954	Jean Louis	It Should Happen to You	Nominated	
1954	Jean Louis	A Star Is Born	Nominated	Shared with Mary Ann Nyberg, and Irene Sharaff.
1954	Rosine Delamare	The Earrings of Madame de…	Nominated	Shared with Yury Annenkov.
1954	Christian Dior	Terminal Station	Nominated	
1955	Jean Louis	Queen Bee	Nominated	
1956	Jean Louis	The Solid Gold Cadillac	Won	
1957	Hubert de Givenchy	Funny Face	Nominated	Shared with Edith Head.
1957	Jean Louis	Pal Joey	Nominated	
1958	Jean Louis	Bell, book, and candle	Nominated	
1961	Jean Louis	Back Street	Nominated	
1961	Jean Louis	Judgment at Nuremberg	Nominated	
1965	Jean Louis	Ship of Fools	Nominated	Shared with Bill Thomas.
1966	Jean Louis	Gambit	Nominated	
1967	Jean Louis	Thoroughly Modern Millie	Nominated	
1979	Albert Wolsky	All That Jazz	Won	Wolsky is a French-born American costume designer.
1980	Jean-Pierre Dorléac	Somewhere in Time	Nominated	
1982	Albert Wolsky	Sophie's Choice	Nominated	
1983	Anne-Marie Marchand	The Return of Martin Guerre	Nominated	
1985	Albert Wolsky	The Journey of Natty Gann	Nominated	
1991	Albert Wolsky	Bugsy	Won	
1991	Corinne Jorry	Madame Bovary	Nominated	
1992	Albert Wolsky	Toys	Nominated	
2007	Albert Wolsky	Across the Universe	Nominated	
2008	Albert Wolsky	Revolutionary Road	Nominated	
2009	Catherine Leterrier	Coco Before Chanel	Nominated	
2016	Madeline Fontaine	Jackie	Nominated	

== Best Makeup and Hairstyling ==
This list focuses on French-born makeup artist.

Year	Winner	Title	Status	Milestone / Notes
1990	Jean-Pierre Eychenne	Cyrano de Bergerac	Nominated	Shared with Michèle Burke.
2007	Didier Lavergne	La Vie en Rose	Won	Shared with Jan Archibald.
2024	Julia Floch Carbonel; Emmanuel Janvier; Jean-Christophe Spadaccini	Emilia Pérez	Nominated	
2024	Pierre-Oliver Persin; Stéphanie Guillon; Marilyne Scarselli	The Substance	Won	

== Best Director ==
Year	Winner	Title	Status	Milestone / Notes
1945	Jean Renoir	The Southerner	Nominated	
1966	Claude Lelouch	A Man and a Woman	Nominated	
1969	Costa-Gavras	Z	Nominated	Costa-Gavras is a Greek-French director born in Greece.
1974	Roman Polanski	Chinatown	Nominated	Polanski is a French-Polish director born in France.
1974	François Truffaut	Day for Night	Nominated	
1979	Edouard Molinaro	La Cage aux Folles	Nominated	
1980	Roman Polanski	Tess	Nominated	
1981	Louis Malle	Atlantic City	Nominated	
1984	Roland Joffé	The Killing Fields	Nominated	Joffé is an English-French director born in the United Kingdom.
1986	Roland Joffé	The Mission	Nominated	
2002	Roman Polanski	The Pianist	Won	
2005	George Clooney	Good Night, and Good Luck	Nominated	
2011	Michel Hazanavicius	The Artist	Won	
2016	Damien Chazelle	La La Land	Won	Chazelle is a French-American director born in the United States. Youngest winner in Best Director category.
2023	Justine Triet	Anatomy of a Fall	Nominated	Triet is the first French woman to be nominated for Best Director.
2024	Jacques Audiard	Emilia Pérez	Nominated	
2024	Coralie Fargeat	The Substance	Nominated	

== Best Documentary Feature ==
This list focuses on French-born producers/directors.

Year	Winner	Title	Status	Milestone / Notes
1955	René Risacher	Crèvecoeur	Nominated	
1956	Jacques-Yves Cousteau	The Silent World	Won	
1961	René Lafuite	Sky Above and Mud Beneath	Won	Shared with Arthur Cohn.
1963	Paul de Roubaix	The Link and the Chain	Nominated	
1964	Jean Aurel	14-18	Nominated	Aurel was a Romanian-born French film director and scriptwriter.
1964	Jacques-Yves Cousteau	World Without Sun	Won	
1965	Frédéric Rossif	To Die in Madrid	Nominated	
1966	Haroun Tazieff	Le Volcan interdit	Nominated	
1967	Pierre Schoendoerffer	The Anderson Platoon	Won	
1969	Bernard Chevry	Arthur Rubinstein – The Love of Life	Won	
1971	Marcel Ophüls	The Sorrow and the Pity	Nominated	
1978	Albert Lamorisse	The Lovers' Wind	Nominated	
1978	Michel Gast	Raoni	Nominated	Shared with Jean-Pierre Dutilleux and Barry Hugh Williams.
1979	Jacques Bobet	Going the Distance	Nominated	Shared with Paul Cowan.
1988	Marcel Ophüls	Hôtel Terminus: The Life and Times of Klaus Barbie	Won	
2001	Jean-Xavier de Lestrade; Denis Poncet	Murder on a Sunday Morning	Won	
2002	Jacques Perrin	Winged Migration	Nominated	
2005	Yves Darondeau; Luc Jacquet	March of the Penguins	Won	
2014	Mathilde Bonnefoy	Citizenfour	Won	Shared with Laura Poitras and Dirk Wilutzky.
2014	David Rosier	The Salt of the Earth	Nominated	Shared with Wim Wenders and Juliano Ribeiro Salgado.
2016	Rémi Grellety	I Am Not Your Negro	Nominated	Shared with Raoul Peck and Hébert Peck.
2017	Agnès Varda; JR; Rosalie Varda	Faces Places	Nominated	Oldest competitive Oscar nominee.
2024	Rémi Grellety	Soundtrack to a Coup d'Etat	Nominated	Shared with Johan Grimonprez and Daan Milius

== Best Editing ==
This list focuses on French-born film editors.

Year	Winner	Title	Status	Milestone / Notes
1969	Françoise Bonnot	Z	Won	
1989	Noëlle Boisson	The Bear	Nominated	
2002	Hervé de Luze	The Pianist	Nominated	
2006	Álex Rodríguez	Children of Men	Nominated	Rodríguez is a French-born Mexican editor. Nominated with Alfonso Cuarón.
2007	Juliette Welfling	The Diving Bell and the Butterfly	Nominated	
2011	Anne-Sophie Bion; Michel Hazanavicius	The Artist	Nominated	
2020	Frédéric Thoraval	Promising Young Woman	Nominated	Thoraval is a French-American film editor.
2020	Yorgos Lamprinos	The Father	Nominated	Lamprimos is a Greek-French film editor.
2023	Laurent Sénéchal	Anatomy of a Fall	Nominated	
2024	Juliette Welfling	Emilia Pérez	Nominated	

== Best Picture ==
This list focuses on French-born producers.

Year	Winner	Title	Status	Milestone / Notes
1938	Réalisation d'art cinématographique	Grand Illusion	Nominated	
1969	Jacques Perrin	Z	Nominated	Shared with Ahmed Rachedi.
1980	Claude Berri	Tess	Nominated	Shared with Timothy Burrill.
2002	Robert Benmussa; Roman Polanski; Alain Sarde	The Pianist	Nominated	
2009	Nicolas Chartier	The Hurt Locker	Won	First French-produced film to win Best Picture. Shared with Kathryn Bigelow, Mark Boal, and Greg Shapiro.
2011	Thomas Langmann	The Artist	Won	Second French-produced film to win Best Picture.
2012	George Clooney	Argo	Won	Shared with Ben Affleck and Grant Heslov
2012	Margaret Ménégoz	Amour	Nominated	Margaret Ménégoz is a German-French film producer. Shared with Stefan Arndt, Veit Heiduschka, and Michael Katz.
2017	Emilie Georges	Call Me by Your Name	Nominated	Shared with Peter Spears, Luca Guadagnino, and Marco Morabito.
2020	Jean-Louis Livi; Philippe Carcassonne	The Father	Nominated	Shared with David Parfitt.
2020	Sacha Ben Harroche	Sound of Metal	Nominated	Shared with Bert Hamelinick.
2021	Philippe Rousselet	CODA	Won	First US remake of a French film (La Famille Bélier) to win this award. Shared with Fabrice Gianfermi, and Patrick Wachsberger.
2022	Philippe Bober	Triangle of Sadness	Nominated	
2022	Alexandra Milchan	Tár	Nominated	Alexandra Milchan is a French-American film and television producer. Shared with Todd Field, and Scott Lamber.
2023	Marie-Ange Luciani; David Thion	Anatomy of a Fall	Nominated	
2024	Pascal Caucheteux; Jacques Audiard	Emilia Pérez	Nominated	
2024	Coralie Fargeat	The Substance	Nominated	Shared with Tim Bevan and Eric Fellner.
2025	Timothée Chalamet	Marty Supreme	Nominated	Shared with Eli Bush, Ronald Bronstein, Josh Safdie, and Anthony Katagas.
2025	Emilie Lesclaux	The Secret Agent	Nominated	

== Best International Feature Film ==
Year	Film	Result
1948	Monsieur Vincent	Honorary Award
1949	The Walls of Malapaga	Honorary Award
1952	Forbidden Games	Honorary Award
1956	Gervaise	Nominated
1957	Gates of Paris	Nominated
1958	Mon Oncle	Won
1959	Orfeu Negro	Won
1960	The Truth	Nominated
1962	Sundays and Cybele	Won
1964	The Umbrellas of Cherbourg	Nominated
1966	A Man and a Woman	Won
1967	Live for Life	Nominated
1968	Stolen Kisses	Nominated
1969	My Night at Maud's	Nominated
1970	Hoa-Binh	Nominated
1972	The Discreet Charm of the Bourgeoisie	Won
1973	Day for Night	Won
1974	Lacombe, Lucien	Nominated
1976	Cousin Cousine	Nominated
1977	Madame Rosa	Won
1978	Get Out Your Handkerchiefs	Won
1979	A Simple Story	Nominated
1980	The Last Metro	Nominated
1982	Coup de Torchon	Nominated
1983	Entre Nous	Nominated
1985	Three Men and a Cradle	Nominated
1986	Betty Blue	Nominated
1987	Au revoir les enfants	Nominated
1989	Camille Claudel	Nominated
1990	Cyrano de Bergerac	Nominated
1992	Indochine	Won
1996	Ridicule	Nominated
1999	East/West	Nominated
2000	The Taste of Others	Nominated
2001	Amélie	Nominated
2004	The Chorus	Nominated
2005	Joyeux Noël	Nominated
2008	The Class	Nominated
2009	A Prophet	Nominated
2015	Mustang	Nominated
2019	Les Misérables	Nominated
2024	Emilia Pérez	Nominated
2025	It Was Just an Accident	Nominated

== Best Music ==
This list focuses on scores or songs created by French-born composers.

=== Original Score ===
Year	Writer	Award	Film	Result
1945	Alexandre Tansman	Best Score of a Dramatic or Comedy Picture	Paris Underground	Nominated
1962	Michel Magne	Best Scoring of Music – Adaptation or Treatment	Gigot	Nominated
1962	Maurice Jarre	Best Score – Substantially Original	Lawrence of Arabia	Won
1963	Maurice Jarre	Best Scoring of Music – Adaptation or Treatment	Sundays and Cybele	Nominated
1964	Leo Arnaud	Best Scoring of Music – Adaptation or Treatment	The Unsinkable Molly Brown	Nominated
1965	Michel Legrand	Best Scoring of Music – Adaptation or Treatment	The Umbrellas of Cherbourg	Nominated
1965	Jacques Demy; Michel Legrand	Best Score – Substantially Original	The Umbrellas of Cherbourg	Nominated
1965	Maurice Jarre	Best Score – Substantially Original	Doctor Zhivago	Won
1968	Michel Legrand	Best Score – Substantially Original	The Thomas Crown Affair	Nominated
1968	Jacques Demy; Michel Legrand	Best Score – Musical Picture (Original or Adaptation)	The Young Girls of Rochefort	Nominated
1969	Georges Delerue	Best Original Score	Anne of the Thousand Days	Nominated
1970	Francis Lai	Best Original Score	Love Story	Won
1971	Michel Legrand	Best Original Dramatic Score	Summer of '42	Won
1973	Georges Delerue	Best Original Dramatic Score	The Day of the Dolphin	Nominated
1977	Georges Delerue	Best Original Score	Julia	Nominated
1977	Maurice Jarre	Best Original Score	Mohammad, Messenger of God	Nominated
1979	Georges Delerue	Best Original Score	A Little Romance	Won
1980	Philippe Sarde	Best Original Score	Tess	Nominated
1983	Michel Legrand	Best Original Song Score and Its Adaptation or Best Adaptation Score	Yentl	Won
1984	Maurice Jarre	Best Original Score	A Passage to India	Won
1985	Maurice Jarre	Best Original Score	Witness	Nominated
1985	Georges Delerue	Best Original Score	Agnes of God	Nominated
1988	Maurice Jarre	Best Original Score	Gorillas in the Mist	Nominated
1990	Maurice Jarre	Best Original Score	Ghost	Nominated
1996	Gabriel Yared	Best Original Score – Dramatic	The English Patient	Won
1999	Gabriel Yared	Best Original Score	The Talented Mr. Ripley	Nominated
2003	Gabriel Yared	Best Original Score	Cold Mountain	Nominated
2006	Alexandre Desplat	Best Original Score	The Queen	Nominated
2008	Alexandre Desplat	Best Original Score	The Curious Case of Benjamin Button	Nominated
2009	Alexandre Desplat	Best Original Score	Fantastic Mr. Fox	Nominated
2010	Alexandre Desplat	Best Original Score	The King's Speech	Nominated
2011	Ludovic Bource	Best Original Score	The Artist	Won
2012	Alexandre Desplat	Best Original Score	Argo	Nominated
2013	Alexandre Desplat	Best Original Score	Philomena	Nominated
2014	Alexandre Desplat	Best Original Score	The Grand Budapest Hotel	Won
2014	Alexandre Desplat	Best Original Score	The Imitation Game	Nominated
2017	Alexandre Desplat	Best Original Score	The Shape of Water	Won
2018	Alexandre Desplat	Best Original Score	Isle of Dogs	Nominated
2019	Alexandre Desplat	Best Original Score	Little Women	Nominated
2024	Clément Ducol; Camille	Best Original Score	Emilia Pérez	Nominated
2025	Alexandre Desplat	Best Original Score	Frankenstein	Nominated

=== Original Song ===
Year	Winner	Song and Film	Status	Milestone / Notes
1965	Jacques Demy; Michel Legrand	The Umbrellas of Cherbourg for the song: "I Will Wait for You"	Nominated	
1968	Michel Legrand	The Thomas Crown Affair for the song: "The Windmills of Your Mind"	Won	
1969	Michel Legrand	The Happy Ending for the song: "What Are You Doing the Rest of Your Life?"	Nominated	
1970	Michel Legrand	Pieces of Dreams for the song: "Pieces of Dream"	Nominated	
1972	Maurice Jarre	The Life and Times of Judge Roy Bean for the song: "Marmalade, Molasses & Honey"	Nominated	
2003	Sylvain Chomet	The Triplets of Belleville for the song: "Belleville Rendez-vous"	Nominated	Nomination shared with Benoit Charest
2004	Christophe Barratier; Bruno Coulais	The Chorus for the song: "Look to Your Path (Vois sur ton chemin)"	Nominated	
2009	Reinhardt Wagner; Frank Thomas	Paris 36 for the song: "Loin de Paname"	Nominated	
2012	Claude-Michel Schönberg; Alain Boublil	Les Misérables for the song: "Suddenly"	Nominated	Nomination shared with Herbert Kretzmer
2024	Clément Ducol; Camille; Jacques Audiard	Emilia Pérez for the song: "El Mal"	Won	
2024	Camille; Clément Ducol	Emilia Pérez for the song: "Mi Camino"	Nominated	

== Best Short Film ==
=== Live Action ===
Year	Winner	Title	Status	Milestone / Notes
1949	Gaston Diehl; Robert Hessens	Van Gogh	Won	
1951	Les Films du Compass	Balzac	Nominated	
1959	Jacques Cousteau	The Golden Fish	Won	
1962	Jean-Claude Carrière; Pierre Étaix	Heureux Anniversaire	Won	
1963	Marcel Ichac; Paul de Roubaix	An Occurrence at Owl Creek Bridge	Won	
1965	Claude Berri	The Chicken	Won	
1966	Marin Karmitz; Vladimir Florency	Turkey on the Bridge	Nominated	
1974	Paul Claudon; Edmond Séchan	One-Eyed Men Are Kings	Won	
1992	Sam Karmann	Omnibus	Won	
1993	Didier Flamand	The Screw	Nominated	
2002	Philippe Orreindy; Thomas Gaudin	J'attendrai le suivant	Nominated	
2003	Lionel Bailliu	Squash	Nominated	
2007	Philippe Pollet-Villard	Le Mozart des Pickpockets	Won	
2008	Elizabeth Marre; Olivier Pont	Manon on the Asphalt	Nominated	
2013	Xavier Legrand; Alexandre Gavras	Just Before Losing Everything	Nominated	
2014	Julien Féret	Butter Lamp	Nominated	Shared with Hu Wei.
2015	Eric Dupont	Ave Maria	Nominated	Shared with Basil Khalil.
2016	Selim Azzazi	Ennemis intérieurs	Nominated	
2025	Alexandre Singh	Two People Exchanging Saliva	Won	Shared with Natalie Musteata.

=== Animated ===
Year	Winner	Title	Status	Milestone / Notes
1967	Jean-Charles Meunier	Hypothese Beta	Nominated	
1980	Frédéric Back	All Nothing	Nominated	Back is a French-born Canadian producer and director of short films
1981	Frédéric Back	Crac	Won	
1987	Frédéric Back	The Man Who Planted Trees	Won	
1993	Frédéric Back	The Mighty River	Nominated	Shared with Hubert Tison
1997	Sylvain Chomet	The Old Lady and the Pigeons	Nominated	
2007	Samuel Tourneux; Simon Vanesse	Even Pigeons Go to Heaven	Nominated	
2008	Thierry Marchand	Oktapodi	Nominated	Shared with Emud Mokhberi
2009	Nicolas Schmerkin	Logorama	Won	Schmerkin is an Argentinian-born French producer.
2009	Fabrice O. Joubert	French Roast	Nominated	
2010	Bastien Dubois	Madagascar, a Journey Diary	Nominated	
2013	Laurent Witz; Alexandre Espigares	Mr Hublot	Won	
2017	Victor Caire; Gabriel Grapperon	Garden Party	Nominated	
2023	Stéphanie Clément; Marc Rius	Pachyderme	Nominated	
2024	Loïc Espuche; Juliette Marquet	Yuck!	Nominated	
2025	Florence Miailhe; Ron Dyens	Butterfly	Nominated	

=== Documentary ===
Year	Winner	Title	Status	Milestone / Notes
1966	Marin Karmitz; Vladimir Forgency	Adolescence	Nominated	

== Best Sound ==
Year	Winner	Title	Status	Milestone / Notes
1977	Jean-Louis Ducarme	Sorcerer	Nominated	Shared with Robert Knudson, Robert Glass and Richard Tyler
2001	Guillaume Leriche; Vincent Arnardi; Jean Umansky	Amélie	Nominated	
2020	Nicolas Becker	Sound of Metal	Won	Shared with Jaime Baksht, Michelle Couttolenc, Carlos Cortes and Philip Bladh
2024	Erwan Kerzanet; Aymeric Devoldère; Maxence Dussère; Cyril Holtz; Niels Barletta	Emilia Pérez	Nominated	

== Best Visual Effects ==
Year	Winner	Title	Status	Milestone / Notes
1962	Jacques Maumont	The Longest Day	Won	Shared with Robert MacDonald. Last to win before the name changed.
1963	Emil Kosa, Jr.	Cleopatra	Won	First person to win Visual effects after the name change
1969	Eugène Lourié	Krakatoa, East of Java	Nominated	Shared with Alex Weldon
1994	Jacques Stroweis	True Lies	Nominated	Nomination shared with John Bruno, Thomas L. Fisher and Patrick McClung
2010	Nicolas Aithadi	Harry Potter and the Deathly Hallows – Part 1	Nominated	Shared with Tim Burke, John Richardson and Christian Manz.
2012	Cedric Nicolas-Troyan	Snow White and the Huntsman	Nominated	Nomination shared with Philip Brennan, Neil Corbould and Michael Dawson
2012	Guillaume Rocheron	Life of Pi	Won	Nomination shared with Bill Westenhofer, Erik De Boer, and Donald Elliot
2014	Stephane Ceretti; Nicolas Aithadi	Guardians of the Galaxy	Nominated	Nomination shared with Paul Corbould and Jonathan Fawkner
2016	Stephane Ceretti	Doctor Strange	Nominated	Shared with Richard Bluff, Vincent Cirelli and Paul Corbould
2019	Stephane Grabli	The Irishman	Nominated	Shared with Pablo Helman, Leandro Estebecorena and Nelson Sepulveda
2019	Guillaume Rocheron	1917	Won	Shared with Greg Butler and Dominic Tuohy
2023	Stéphane Ceretti; Alexis Wajsbrot	Guardians of the Galaxy Vol. 3	Nominated	Shared with Guy Williams and Theo Bialek.
2023	Luc-Ewen Martin-Fenoillet	Napoleon	Nominated	Shared with Charley Henley, Simone Coco, and Neil Corbould
2025	Nicolas Chevallier	F1	Nominated	Shared with Ryan Tudhope, Robert Harrington, and Keith Dawson

== Best Writing ==
This list focuses on French-born writers.

=== Adapted Screenplay ===
Year	Winner	Title	Status	Milestone / Notes
1951	Jacques Natanson; Max Ophüls	La Ronde	Nominated	
1957	Pierre Boulle	The Bridge on the River Kwai	Won	Pierre Boulle was credited as the screenwriter of The Bridge on the River Kwai and ultimately won the award. Blacklisted writers Michael Wilson and Carl Foreman, who actually wrote the screenplay, were awarded posthumous Oscars by the Academy's Board of Governors in 1984.
1963	Serge Bourguignon; Antoine Tudal	Sundays and Cybele	Nominated	
1968	Roman Polanski	Rosemary's Baby	Nominated	
1969	Costa-Gavras	Z	Nominated	Nominated with Jorge Semprún
1977	Jean-Claude Carrière	That Obscure Object of Desire	Nominated	Nominated with Luis Buñuel
1979	Edouard Molinaro; Jean Poiret; Francis Veber	La Cage aux Folles	Nominated	Nominated with Marcello Danon
1982	Costa-Gavras	Missing	Won	Shared with Donald E. Stewart
1988	Christine Edzard	Little Dorrit	Nominated	
1988	Jean-Claude Carrière	The Unbearable Lightness of Being	Nominated	
2004	Julie Delpy	Before Sunset	Nominated	Nominated with Americans Richard Linklater, Ethan Hawke and Kim Krizan
2011	George Clooney	The Ides of March	Nominated	
2013	Julie Delpy	Before Midnight	Nominated	Nominated with Americans Richard Linklater and Ethan Hawke
2014	Damien Chazelle	Whiplash	Nominated	Chazelle is a French-American writer born in the United States.
2020	Florian Zeller	The Father	Won	Nominated with Christopher Hampton
2024	Jacques Audiard; Thomas Bidegain; Léa Mysius; Nicolas Livecchi	Emilia Pérez	Nominated	

=== Original Screenplay ===
Year	Winner	Title	Status	Milestone / Notes
1946	Jacques Prévert	Children of Paradise	Nominated	
1949	Marcello Pagliero	Paisan	Nominated	Pagliero was an Italian-French director, actor, and screenwriter. Shared with Alfred Hayes, Federico Fellini, Sergio Amidei and Roberto Rossellini
1955	Jacques Tati; Henri Marquet	Les Vacances de Monsieur Hulot	Nominated	
1956	Albert Lamorisse	The Red Balloon	Won	
1959	Marcel Moussy; François Truffaut	The 400 Blows	Nominated	Moussy is an Algerian-born French writer.
1960	Marguerite Duras	Hiroshima, My Love	Nominated	Duras was born in French Cochinchina (now Vietnam).
1962	Alain Robbe-Grillet	Last Year at Marienbad	Nominated	
1964	Jean-Paul Rappeneau; Ariane Mnouchkine; Daniel Boulanger; Philippe de Broca	That Man from Rio	Nominated	
1965	Jacques Demy	The Umbrellas of Cherbourg	Nominated	
1966	Claude Lelouch; Pierre Uytterhoeven	A Man and a Woman	Won	
1970	Eric Rohmer	My Night at Maud's	Nominated	
1972	Jean-Claude Carrière	The Discreet Charm of the Bourgeoisie	Nominated	Nominated with Luis Buñuel
1972	Louis Malle	Murmur of the Heart	Nominated	
1974	Jean-Louis Richard; Suzanne Schiffman; François Truffaut	Day for Night	Nominated	
1975	Claude Lelouch; Pierre Uytterhoeven	And Now My Love	Nominated	
1976	Jean Charles Tacchella; Danièle Thompson	Cousin, cousine	Nominated	Thompson was born in Monaco.
1980	Jean Gruault	My American Uncle	Nominated	
1987	Louis Malle	Goodbye, Children	Nominated	
2001	Jean-Pierre Jeunet; Guillaume Laurant	Amélie	Nominated	
2004	Pierre Bismuth; Michel Gondry	Eternal Sunshine of the Spotless Mind	Won	Nominated with Charlie Kaufman.
2005	George Clooney	Good Night, and Good Luck	Nominated	
2011	Michel Hazanavicius	The Artist	Nominated	
2016	Damien Chazelle	La La Land	Nominated	Chazelle is a French-American writer born in the United States.
2023	Justine Triet; Arthur Harari	Anatomy of a Fall	Won	Triet and Harari are partners
2024	Coralie Fargeat	The Substance	Nominated	

=== Story ===
Year	Winner	Title	Status	Milestone / Notes
1931	Harry d'Abbadie d'Arrast	Laughter	Nominated	d'Arrast was an Argentinean born, French screenwriter and director. Shared with Douglas Doty, Donald Stewart
1946	Vladimir Pozner	The Dark Mirror	Nominated	Pozner is a Russian-born French writer and translator
1947	Georges Chaperot; René Wheeler	A Cage of Nightingales	Nominated	
1954	François Boyer	Forbidden Games	Nominated	
1955	Jean Marsan; Henri Troyat; Jacques Perret; Henri Verneuil; Raoul Ploquin	The Sheep Has Five Legs	Nominated	Troyat was a Russian-born French author, biographer, historian and novelist. Verneuil was a French-Armenian playwright and filmmaker.
1956	Jean-Paul Sartre	The Proud and the Beautiful	Nominated	

== Honorary Awards ==
This list focuses on French-born recipients of the Honorary Award

Year	Recipient	Milestone / Notes
1942	Charles Boyer	"for his progressive cultural achievement in establishing the French Research Foundation in Los Angeles as a source of reference for the Hollywood Motion Picture Industry"
1958	Maurice Chevalier	"for his contributions to the world of entertainment for more than half a century."
1973	Henri Langlois	"for his devotion to the art of film, his massive contributions in preserving its past and his unswerving faith in its future."
1974	Jean Renoir	"a genius who, with grace, responsibility and enviable devotion through silent film, sound film, feature, documentary and television, has won the world's admiration."
2010	Jean-Luc Godard	"For passion. For confrontation. For a new kind of cinema."
2014	Jean-Claude Carrière	"Whose elegantly crafted screenplays elevate the art of screenwriting to the level of literature."
2017	Agnès Varda	"Her compassion and curiosity inform a uniquely personal cinema."

== Nominations and Winners ==
No. of wins	No. of nominations
97	352

== See also ==
- Cinema of France
- List of British Academy Award nominees and winners
