= 74th Academy Awards =

- Official poster by Alex Ross
- Date: March 24, 2002
- Site: Kodak Theatre; Hollywood, Los Angeles, California, U.S.
- Hosted by: Whoopi Goldberg
- Preshow hosts: Chris Connelly; Leeza Gibbons; Ananda Lewis
- Produced by: Laura Ziskin
- Directed by: Louis J. Horvitz

Highlights
- Best Picture: A Beautiful Mind
- Most awards: A Beautiful Mind and The Lord of the Rings: The Fellowship of the Ring (4)
- Most nominations: The Lord of the Rings: The Fellowship of the Ring (13)

TV in the United States
- Network: ABC
- Duration: 4 hours, 23 minutes
- Ratings: 41.82 million 25.54% (Nielsen ratings)

The 74th Academy Awards ceremony, presented by the Academy of Motion Picture Arts and Sciences (AMPAS), took place on March 24, 2002, at the Kodak Theatre in Hollywood, Los Angeles. During the ceremony, AMPAS presented Academy Awards (commonly referred to as Oscars) in 24 categories honoring films released in 2001. The ceremony, televised in the United States by ABC, was produced by Laura Ziskin and directed by Louis J. Horvitz. Actress Whoopi Goldberg hosted the show for the fourth time. She first hosted the 66th ceremony held in 1994 and had last hosted the 71st ceremony in 1999. Three weeks earlier, in a ceremony held at the Regent Beverly Wilshire Hotel in Beverly Hills, California, on March 2, the Academy Awards for Technical Achievement were presented by Charlize Theron.

A Beautiful Mind won four Academy Awards, including Best Picture. Other winners included The Lord of the Rings: The Fellowship of the Ring with four awards, Black Hawk Down and Moulin Rouge! with two, and The Accountant, For the Birds, Gosford Park, Iris, Monster's Ball, Monsters, Inc., Murder on a Sunday Morning, No Man's Land, Pearl Harbor, Shrek, Thoth, and Training Day with one. Despite a record length of four hours and twenty-three minutes, the telecast garnered nearly 42 million viewers in the United States.

== Winners and nominees ==
The nominees for the 74th Academy Awards were announced on February 12, 2002, at the Samuel Goldwyn Theater in Beverly Hills, California, by Frank Pierson, president of the academy, and the actress Marcia Gay Harden. The Lord of the Rings: The Fellowship of the Ring earned the most nominations with thirteen. It was the seventh film to earn that many nominations. A Beautiful Mind and Moulin Rouge! tied for second place with eight apiece.

The winners were announced during the awards ceremony on March 24, 2002. By virtue of its latest Best Picture victory for A Beautiful Mind, DreamWorks Pictures became the second film studio to release three consecutive Best Picture winners; the studio had previously released American Beauty and Gladiator. For the first time in Oscars history acting categories had two African-American winners. Denzel Washington was the second non-white person to win the Academy Award for Best Actor, following Sidney Poitier for 1963's Lilies of the Field. Halle Berry became the first, and as of 2026, only, African-American to win the Academy Award for Best Actress. Nominated for their performances as the title character in Iris, Best Actress nominee Judi Dench and Best Supporting Actress nominee Kate Winslet became the second pair of actresses nominated for portraying the same character in the same film, following Best Actress nominee Winslet and Best Supporting Actress nominee Gloria Stuart as Rose in 1997's Titanic.

=== Awards ===
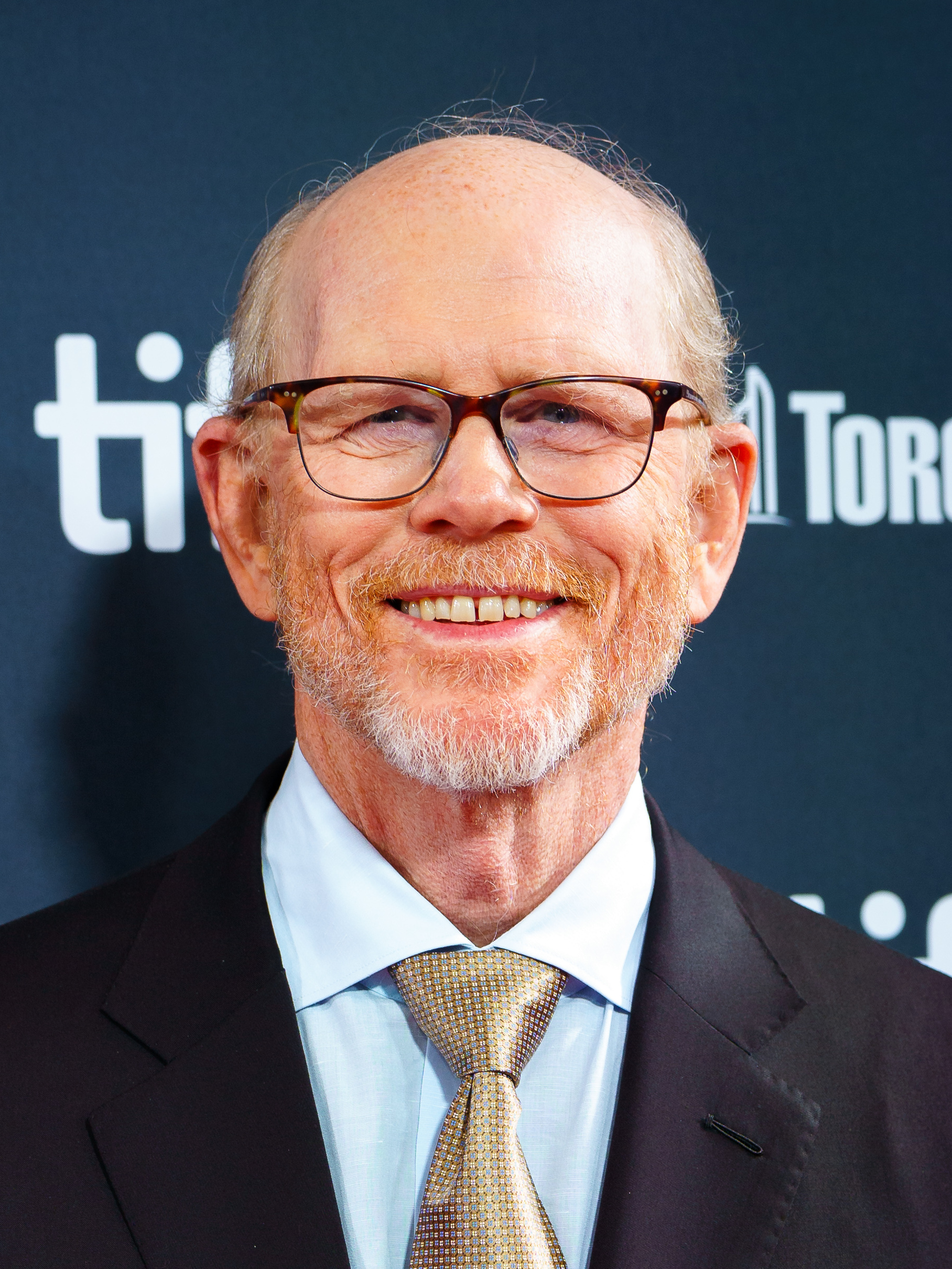
Ron Howard, Best Picture co-winner and Best Director winner

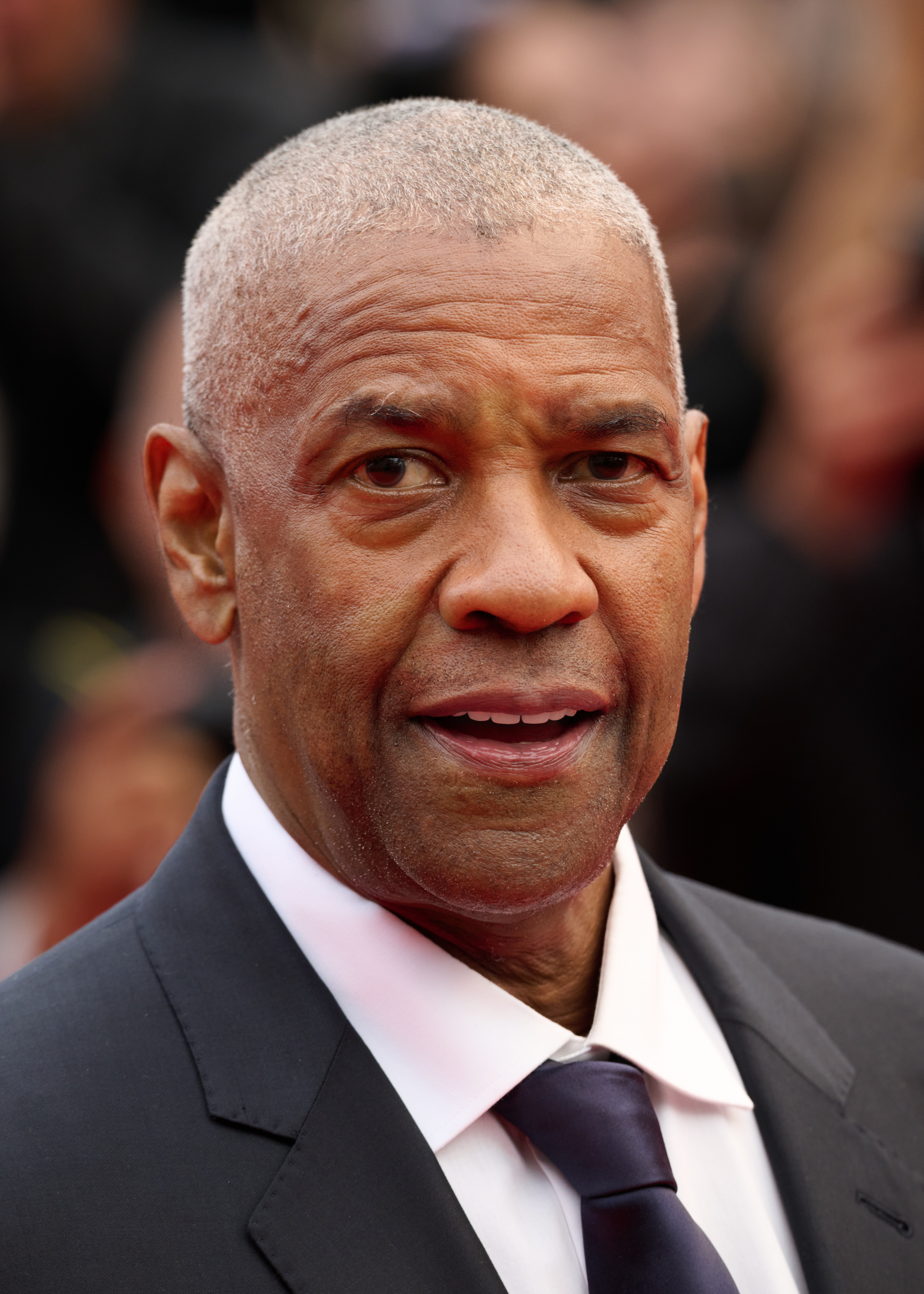
Denzel Washington, Best Actor winner

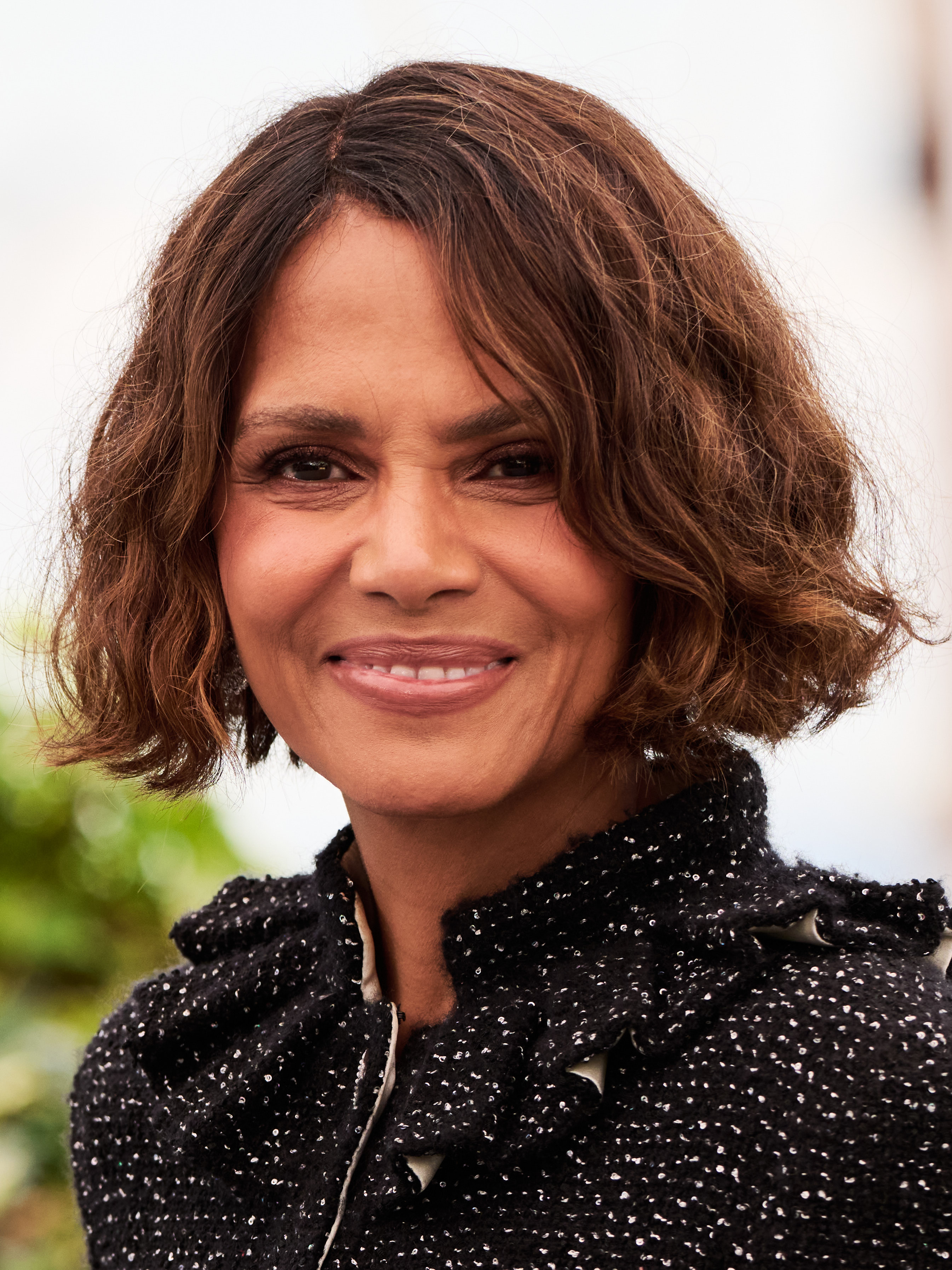
Halle Berry, Best Actress winner

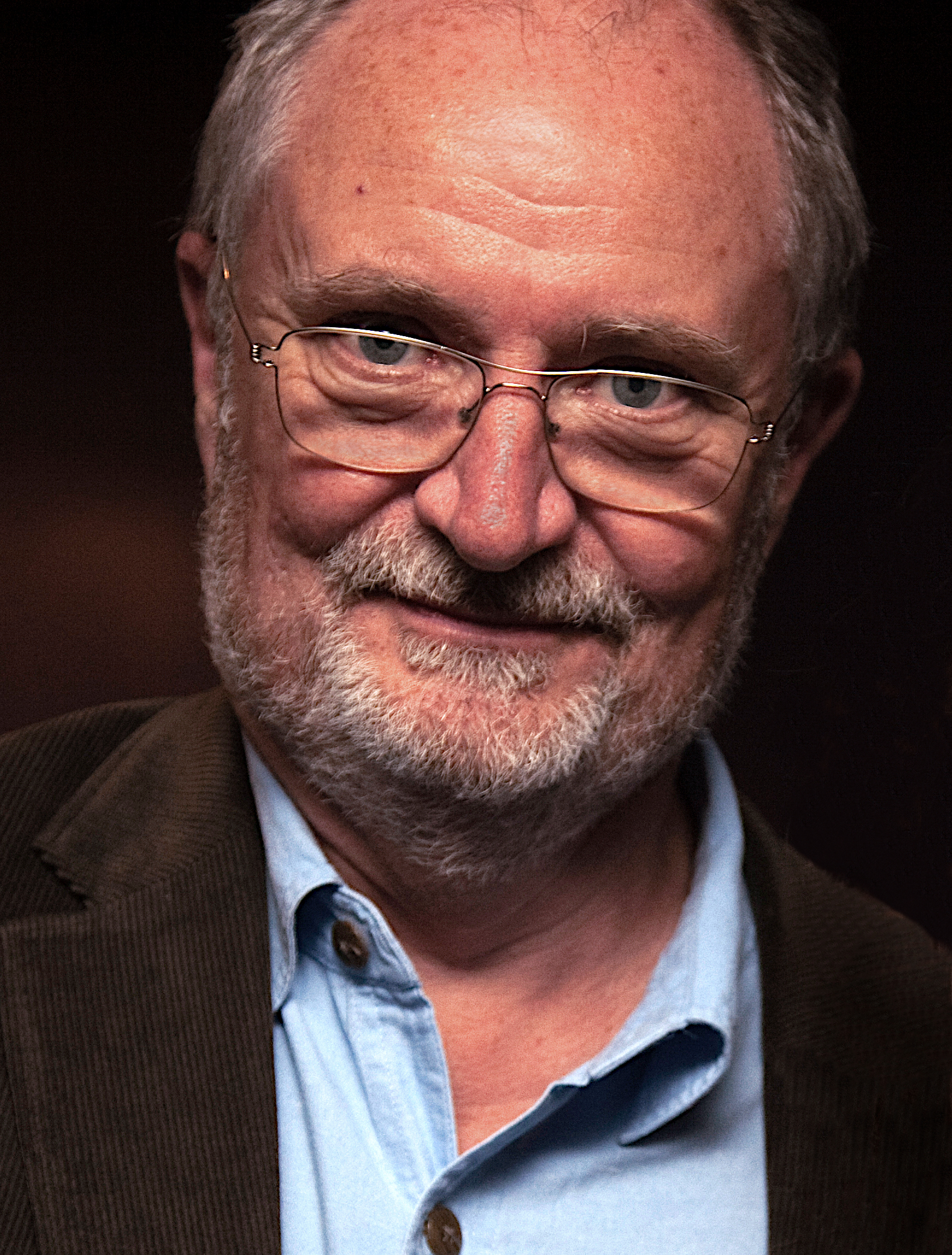
Jim Broadbent, Best Supporting Actor winner

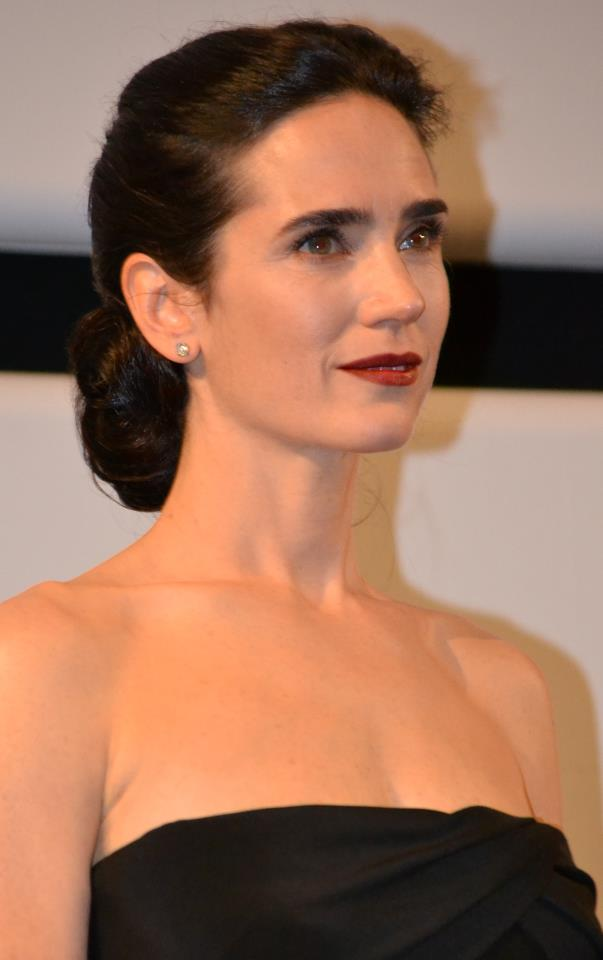
Jennifer Connelly, Best Supporting Actress winner

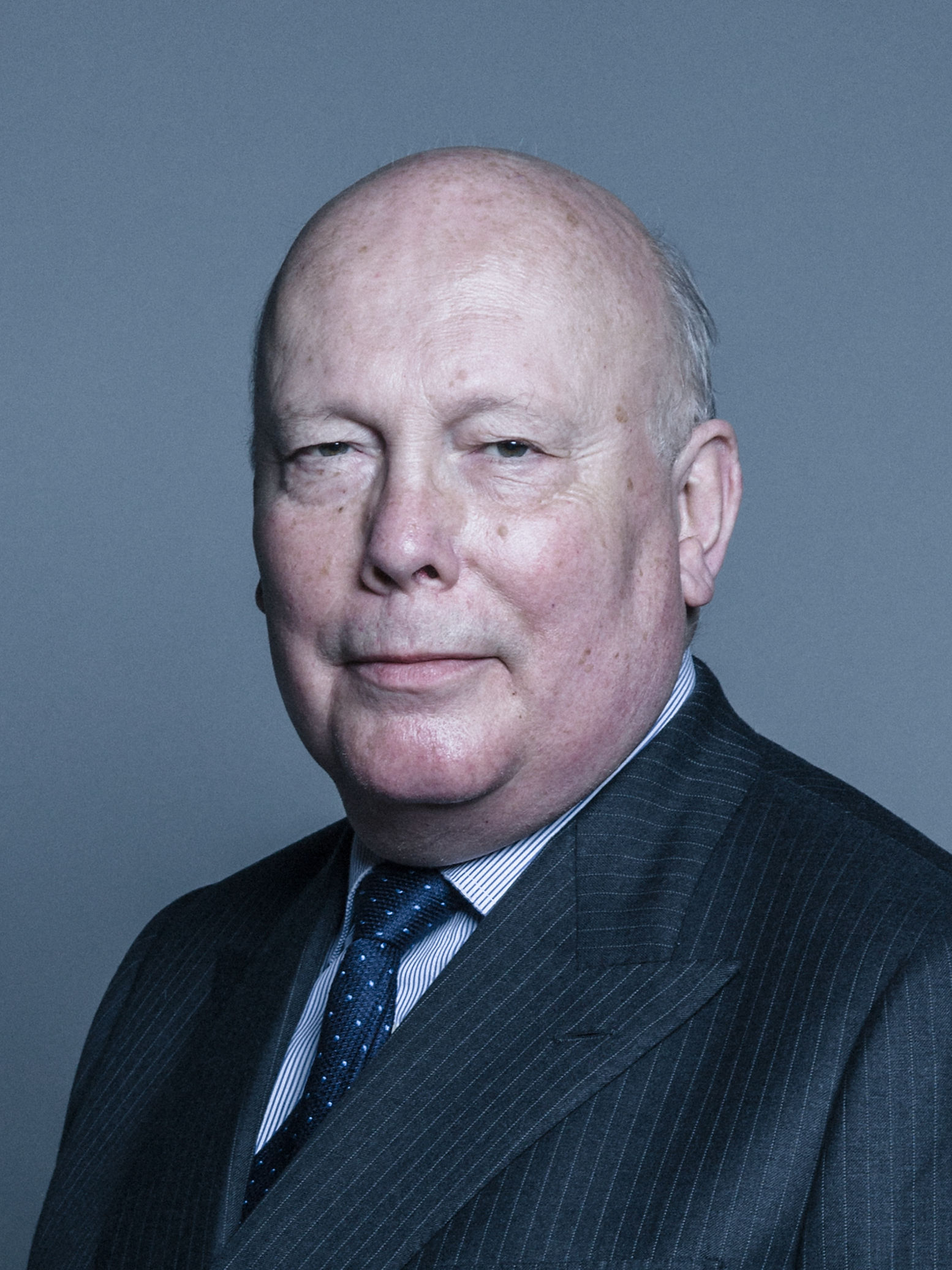
Julian Fellowes, Best Original Screenplay winner

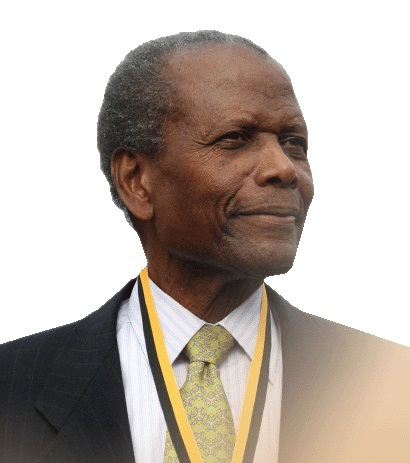
Sidney Poitier received the Honorary Oscar

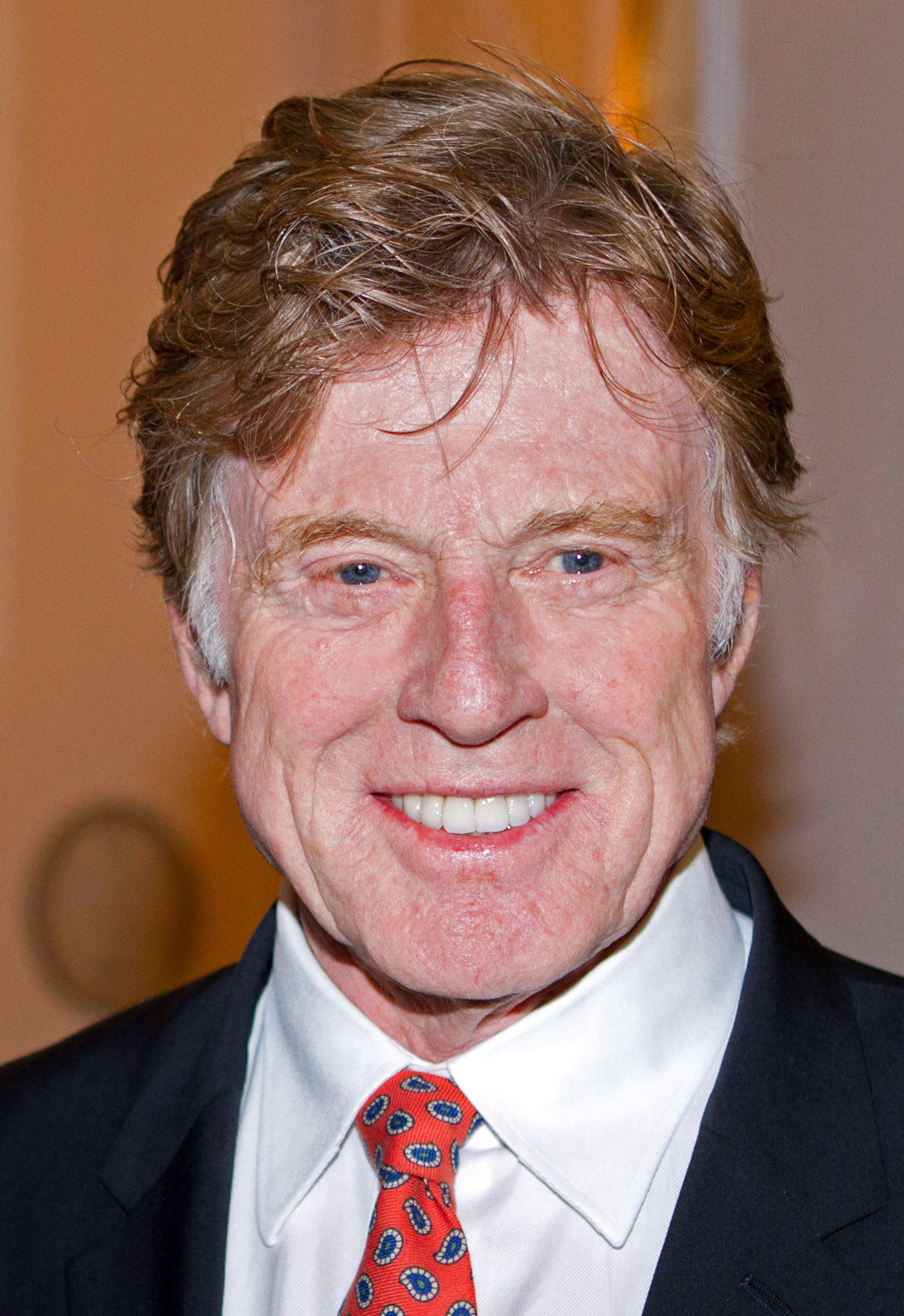
Robert Redford received the Honorary Oscar

Winners are listed first, highlighted in boldface, and indicated with a double dagger (‡).

**Best Picture**: **A Beautiful Mind – Brian Grazer and Ron Howard, producers**‡; Gosford Park – Robert Altman, Bob Balaban and David Levy, producers; In the Bedroom – Graham Leader, Ross Katz and Todd Field, producers; The Lord of the Rings: The Fellowship of the Ring – Peter Jackson, Fran Walsh and Barrie M. Osborne, producers; Moulin Rouge! – Martin Brown, Baz Luhrmann and Fred Baron, producers	**Best Directing**: **Ron Howard – A Beautiful Mind**‡; Ridley Scott – Black Hawk Down; Robert Altman – Gosford Park; Peter Jackson – The Lord of the Rings: The Fellowship of the Ring; David Lynch – Mulholland Drive
**Best Actor in a Leading Role**: **Denzel Washington – Training Day as Alonzo Harris**‡; Russell Crowe – A Beautiful Mind as John Forbes Nash Jr.; Sean Penn – I Am Sam as Sam Dawson; Will Smith – Ali as Muhammad Ali; Tom Wilkinson – In the Bedroom as Dr. Matthew Fowler	**Best Actress in a Leading Role**: **Halle Berry – Monster's Ball as Leticia Musgrove**‡; Judi Dench – Iris as Iris Murdoch; Nicole Kidman – Moulin Rouge! as Satine; Sissy Spacek – In the Bedroom as Ruth Fowler; Renée Zellweger – Bridget Jones's Diary as Bridget Jones
**Best Actor in a Supporting Role**: **Jim Broadbent – Iris as John Bayley**‡; Ethan Hawke – Training Day as Officer Jake Hoyt; Ben Kingsley – Sexy Beast as Don Logan; Ian McKellen – The Lord of the Rings: The Fellowship of the Ring as Gandalf; Jon Voight – Ali as Howard Cosell	**Best Actress in a Supporting Role**: **Jennifer Connelly – A Beautiful Mind as Alicia de Lardé-Nash**‡; Helen Mirren – Gosford Park as Jane Wilson; Maggie Smith – Gosford Park as Constance Trentham; Marisa Tomei – In the Bedroom as Natalie Strout; Kate Winslet – Iris as Iris Murdoch
**Best Writing (Screenplay Written Directly for the Screen)**: **Gosford Park – Julian Fellowes**‡; Amélie – Screenplay by Guillaume Laurant and Jean-Pierre Jeunet; Dialogue by Guillaume Laurant; Memento – Screenplay by Christopher Nolan; Story by Jonathan Nolan; Monster's Ball – Milo Addica and Will Rokos; The Royal Tenenbaums – Wes Anderson and Owen Wilson	**Best Writing (Screenplay Based on Material Previously Produced or Published)**: **A Beautiful Mind – Akiva Goldsman based on the book by Sylvia Nasar**‡; Ghost World – Daniel Clowes and Terry Zwigoff based on the comic book by Daniel Clowes; In the Bedroom – Rob Festinger and Todd Field based on the story "Killings" by Andre Dubus; The Lord of the Rings: The Fellowship of the Ring – Fran Walsh, Philippa Boyens, and Peter Jackson based on the book by J. R. R. Tolkien; Shrek – Ted Elliott, Terry Rossio, Joe Stillman, and Roger S. H. Schulman based on the children's book by William Steig
**Best Animated Feature Film**: **Shrek – Aron Warner**‡; Jimmy Neutron: Boy Genius – Steve Oedekerk and John A. Davis; Monsters, Inc. – Pete Docter and John Lasseter	**Best Foreign Language Film**: **No Man's Land (Bosnia and Herzegovina) in Bosnian – Danis Tanović**‡; Amélie (France) in French – Jean-Pierre Jeunet; Elling (Norway) in Norwegian – Petter Næss; Lagaan (India) in Hindi – Ashutosh Gowariker; Son of the Bride (Argentina) in Spanish – Juan José Campanella
**Best Documentary (Feature)**: **Murder on a Sunday Morning – Jean-Xavier de Lestrade and Denis Poncet**‡; Children Underground – Edet Belzberg; LaLee's Kin: The Legacy of Cotton – Susan Froemke and Deborah Dickson; Promises – Justine Shapiro and B.Z. Goldberg; War Photographer – Christian Frei	**Best Documentary (Short Subject)**: **Thoth – Sarah Kernochan and Lynn Appelle**‡; Artists and Orphans: A True Drama – Lianne Klapper-McNally; Sing! – Freida Lee Mock and Jessica Sanders
**Best Short Film (Live Action)**: **The Accountant – Ray McKinnon and Lisa Blount**‡; Copy Shop – Virgil Widrich; Gregor's Greatest Invention – Johannes Kiefer; A Man Thing (Meska Sprawa) – Sławomir Fabicki and Bogumił Godfrejów; Speed for Thespians – Kalman Apple and Shameela Bakhsh	**Best Short Film (Animated)**: **For the Birds – Ralph Eggleston**‡; Fifty Percent Grey – Ruairí Robinson and Seamus Byrne; Give Up Yer Aul Sins – Cathal Gaffney and Darragh O'Connell; Strange Invaders – Cordell Barker; Stubble Trouble – Joseph E. Merideth
**Best Music (Original Score)**: **The Lord of the Rings: The Fellowship of the Ring – Howard Shore**‡; A.I. Artificial Intelligence – John Williams; A Beautiful Mind – James Horner; Harry Potter and the Sorcerer's Stone – John Williams; Monsters, Inc. – Randy Newman	**Best Music (Original Song)**: **"If I Didn't Have You" from Monsters, Inc. – Music and Lyrics by Randy Newman**‡; "May It Be" from The Lord of the Rings: The Fellowship of the Ring – Music and Lyrics by Enya, Nicky Ryan, and Roma Ryan; "There You'll Be" from Pearl Harbor – Music and Lyrics by Diane Warren; "Until..." from Kate & Leopold – Music and Lyrics by Sting; "Vanilla Sky" from Vanilla Sky – Music and Lyrics by Paul McCartney
**Best Sound**: **Black Hawk Down – Michael Minkler, Myron Nettinga and Chris Munro**‡; Amélie – Vincent Arnardi, Guillaume Leriche and Jean Umansky; The Lord of the Rings: The Fellowship of the Ring – Christopher Boyes, Michael Semanick, Gethin Creagh and Hammond Peek; Moulin Rouge! – Andy Nelson, Anna Behlmer, Roger Savage and Guntis Sics; Pearl Harbor – Kevin O'Connell, Greg P. Russell, and Peter J. Devlin	**Best Sound Editing**: **Pearl Harbor – George Watters II and Christopher Boyes**‡; Monsters, Inc. – Gary Rydstrom and Michael Silvers
**Best Art Direction**: **Moulin Rouge! – Art Direction: Catherine Martin; Set Decoration: Brigitte Broch**‡; Amélie – Art Direction: Aline Bonetto; Set Decoration: Marie-Laure Valla; Gosford Park – Art Direction: Stephen Altman; Set Decoration: Anna Pinnock; Harry Potter and the Sorcerer's Stone – Art Direction: Stuart Craig; Set Decoration: Stephenie McMillan; The Lord of the Rings: The Fellowship of the Ring – Art Direction: Grant Major; Set Decoration: Dan Hennah	**Best Cinematography**: **The Lord of the Rings: The Fellowship of the Ring – Andrew Lesnie**‡; Amélie – Bruno Delbonnel; Black Hawk Down – Sławomir Idziak; The Man Who Wasn't There – Roger Deakins; Moulin Rouge! – Donald M. McAlpine
**Best Makeup**: **The Lord of the Rings: The Fellowship of the Ring – Peter Owen and Richard Taylor**‡; A Beautiful Mind – Greg Cannom and Colleen Callaghan; Moulin Rouge! – Maurizio Silvi and Aldo Signoretti	**Best Costume Design**: **Moulin Rouge! – Catherine Martin and Angus Strathie**‡; The Affair of the Necklace – Milena Canonero; Gosford Park – Jenny Beavan; Harry Potter and the Sorcerer's Stone – Judianna Makovsky; The Lord of the Rings: The Fellowship of the Ring – Ngila Dickson and Richard Taylor
**Best Film Editing**: **Black Hawk Down – Pietro Scalia**‡; A Beautiful Mind – Mike Hill and Dan Hanley; The Lord of the Rings: The Fellowship of the Ring – John Gilbert; Memento – Dody Dorn; Moulin Rouge! – Jill Bilcock	**Best Visual Effects**: **The Lord of the Rings: The Fellowship of the Ring – Jim Rygiel, Randall William Cook, Richard Taylor and Mark Stetson**‡; A.I. Artificial Intelligence – Dennis Muren, Scott Farrar, Stan Winston and Michael Lantieri; Pearl Harbor – Eric Brevig, John Frazier, Ed Hirsh and Ben Snow

=== Honorary Awards ===
- To Sidney Poitier in recognition of his remarkable accomplishments as an artist and as a human being.
- To Robert Redford: actor, director, producer, creator of Sundance, inspiration to independent and innovative filmmakers everywhere.

=== Jean Hersholt Humanitarian Award ===
- Arthur Hiller

=== Films with multiple nominations and awards ===
Films with multiple nominations
Nominations	Film
13	The Lord of the Rings: The Fellowship of the Ring
8	A Beautiful Mind
8	Moulin Rouge!
7	Gosford Park
5	Amélie
5	In the Bedroom
4	Black Hawk Down
4	Monsters, Inc.
4	Pearl Harbor
3	Harry Potter and the Sorcerer's Stone
3	Iris
2	A.I. Artificial Intelligence
2	Ali
2	Memento
2	Monster's Ball
2	Shrek
2	Training Day

Films with multiple awards
Awards	Film
4	A Beautiful Mind
4	The Lord of the Rings: The Fellowship of the Ring
2	Black Hawk Down
2	Moulin Rouge!

== Presenters and performers ==
The following individuals (in order of appearance) presented awards or performed musical numbers.

=== Presenters ===
Name(s)	Role
Donald Sutherland; Glenn Close	Announcers for the 74th annual Academy Awards
Tom Cruise	Presenter of the Errol Morris montage on movie memories
Benicio del Toro	Presenter of the award for Best Supporting Actress
Frank Pierson (AMPAS President)	Giver of the welcome guests to the awards ceremony
Will Smith	Presenter the award for Best Film Editing
Ryan Phillippe; Reese Witherspoon	Presenters of the award for Best Makeup
Whoopi Goldberg	Presenter of the film In the Bedroom on the Best Picture segment
Ben Stiller; Owen Wilson	Presenters of the award for Best Costume Design
Woody Allen	Presenter of the New York City films tribute montage directed by Nora Ephron
Jodie Foster	Presenter of the award for Best Cinematography
Whoopi Goldberg	Presenter of the film Gosford Park on the Best Picture segment
Helen Hunt	Presenter of the Documentary films tribute montage directed by Penelope Spheeris
Samuel L. Jackson	Presenter of the awards for Best Documentary Feature and Best Documentary Short Subject
Cameron Diaz	Presenter of the award for Best Art Direction
Charlize Theron (pre-recorded footage)	Presenter of the award for Academy Scientific and Technical Award and the Gordon E. Sawyer Award
Nathan Lane	Presenter of the award for Best Animated Feature Film
Halle Berry	Presenter of the award for Best Sound and Best Sound Editing
Marcia Gay Harden	Presenter of the award for Best Supporting Actor
Whoopi Goldberg	Presenter of the film The Lord of the Rings: The Fellowship of the Ring on the Best Picture segment
Ian McKellen; Maggie Smith	Introducers of the performance by Cirque du Soleil
Tobey Maguire; Kirsten Dunst	Presenters of the award for Best Visual Effects
Ali MacGraw; Ryan O'Neal	Presenters of the Jean Hersholt Humanitarian Award to Arthur Hiller
Ben Kingsley	Presenter of the tribute to musical scores in films composed and conducted by John Williams
Sandra Bullock; Hugh Grant	Presenters of the award for Best Original Score
Walter Mirisch; Denzel Washington	Presenters of the Academy Honorary Award to Sidney Poitier
Hugh Jackman; Naomi Watts	Presenters of the award for Best Live Action Short Film and Best Animated Short Film
Josh Hartnett	Introducer of the performances of the Best Original Song nominees
Jennifer Lopez	Presenter of the award for Best Original Song
Ethan Hawke; Gwyneth Paltrow	Presenters of the award for Best Screenplay Based on Material Previously Produced or Published/Adapted Screenplay and Best Screenplay Written Directly for the Screen/Original Screenplay
Sharon Stone; John Travolta	Presenters of the award for Best Foreign Language Film
Kevin Spacey	Presenter of the In Memoriam Tribute
Whoopi Goldberg	Presenter of the film Moulin Rouge! on the Best Picture segment
Barbra Streisand	Presenter of the Academy Honorary Award to Robert Redford
Russell Crowe	Presenter of the award for Best Actress
Whoopi Goldberg	Presenter of the film A Beautiful Mind on the Best Picture segment
Julia Roberts	Presenter of the award for Best Actor
Mel Gibson	Presenter of the award for Best Director
Tom Hanks	Presenter of the award for Best Picture

=== Performers ===
Name(s)	Role	Performed
John Williams; Mark Watters	Musical arrangers and conductors	Orchestral medley of themes from various film scores.
Cirque du Soleil	Performers	Special performance in a tribute to movie visual effects
Sting	Performer	"Until" from Kate & Leopold
Enya	Performer	"May it Be" from The Lord of the Rings: The Fellowship of the Ring
John Goodman; Randy Newman	Performers	"If I Didn't Have You" from Monsters, Inc.
Faith Hill	Performer	"There You'll Be" from Pearl Harbor
Paul McCartney	Performer	"Vanilla Sky" from Vanilla Sky

== Ceremony information ==
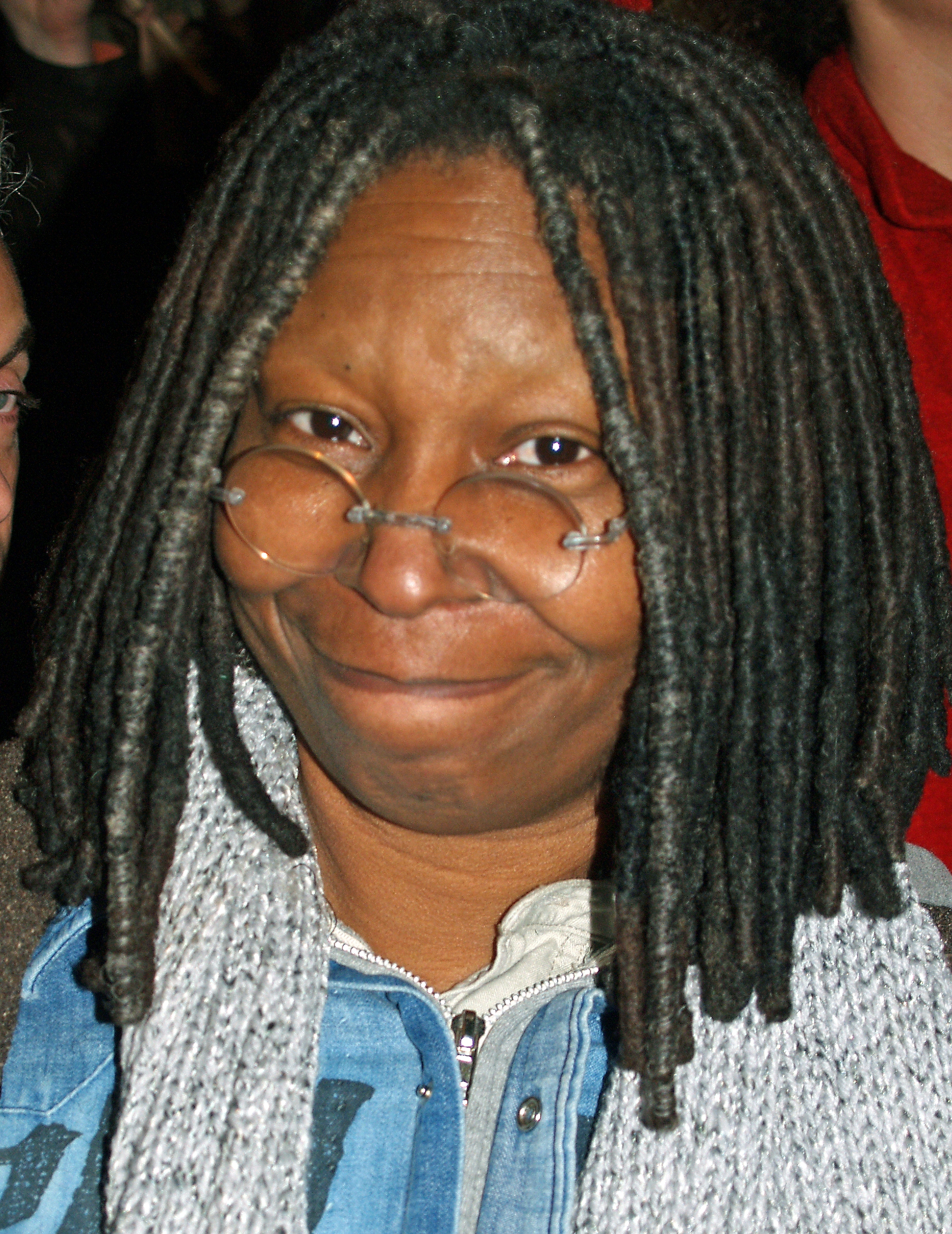
Whoopi Goldberg hosted the 74th Academy Awards.

The Academy wanted to find a new venue for the festivities amid limited seating and rehearsal time concerns with the Dorothy Chandler Pavilion. In addition, problems arose regarding staging the Academy Awards at the Shrine Auditorium because there was difficulty of directing guests from the auditorium where the main event took place to the adjacent Exhibition Hall for the Governor's Ball. In August 1997, AMPAS and Canadian development firm TrizecHahn went into negotiations over the development of an entertainment complex located on the corner of Hollywood Boulevard and Highland Avenue adjacent to the Mann's Chinese Theatre. Seven months later, both the Academy and TrizecHahn agreed on a twenty-year lease that allowed for the ceremony to be staged at a new venue, which would later be called the Kodak Theatre, located within the property which was also situated near the Hollywood Roosevelt Hotel, the site of the inaugural awards ceremony in 1929. This was the first time the ceremony was held in Hollywood since the 32nd ceremony took place at the Pantages Theatre in 1960. Due to new venue, the Academy announced that red carpet bleacher seats would now be limited on a reservation basis based on a random selection and a background check.

In September 2001, AMPAS announced new guidelines in campaigns. Screenings with receptions and Q&A with filmmakers were permitted, while VHS and DVD packaging mailed to Academy members could not include graphics.

In view of the return of the Academy Awards to Hollywood, the Academy hired film producer and Sony Pictures Entertainment chairman Laura Ziskin in September 2001 to oversee production of the telecast. Pierson explained the decision to hire Ziskin saying, "This show is one of the most difficult—if not the most difficult—producing jobs in show business. Laura Ziskin brings intelligence, experience and wit expressed in everything she has done." This marked the first occurrence that a woman produced the Oscars solo. Four months later, Whoopi Goldberg was selected as host of the 2002 ceremony. In an article in the Los Angeles Times, Ziskin justified her choice of Goldberg commenting that she has "great warmth, with humor, humanity and social conscience, all qualities that I feel are essential for this year's show. I look forward to collaborating with Whoopi to put on a meaningful and entertaining evening." John Williams was hired as a music director, for the first time since 48th Academy Awards in 1976; he conducted the orchestra along with Mark Watters.

However, the September 11 attacks affected the telecast and its surrounding events. Despite speculation and suggestions that the festivities be postponed or canceled, AMPAS President Pierson wrote in a Variety column refusing to take such action stating that it would send the message that "the terrorists have won".

On the Academy Award night, Tom Cruise opened the show and stated that it was the job of filmmakers to make films during troubling times. In addition, later in the evening Goldberg introduced a "New York icon" to the stage and filmmaker and director Woody Allen, who had previously never attended a ceremony, made a surprise appearance. He explained that the September 11 attacks influenced him to attend the Oscars so that he could represent the city he deeply admired and urged filmmakers to continue to film in New York City. Allen then presented a film montage directed by fellow New Yorker and screenwriter Nora Ephron saluting New York City in film.

Several other people participated in the production of the ceremony. Actors Donald Sutherland and Glenn Close served as the official announcers during the show. The orchestra performed selections of film scores during a montage saluting film composers produced by Kyle Cooper. Filmmaker Errol Morris filmed a vignette featuring several famous people discuss movie memories. Director Penelope Spheeris produced a montage saluting 60 years of Academy Award-winning documentary feature films. Cirque du Soleil performed a dance number inspired by movies and visual effects, with original music composed by Benoît Jutras and choreography by Debra Brown.

=== Introduction of Best Animated Feature award ===
Beginning with this ceremony, AMPAS introduced a new competitive award that would honor animated feature films. According to Academy communications director John Pavlik, the film must be at least 70 minutes in length, have a significant amount of animated characters, and be at least 75 percent animated in order to be qualified for consideration. A minimum of eight qualifying films must be released within the calendar year to permit a slate of three nominees. If the number of films exceeds twelve, the nominee roster increases to five. Prior to the introduction of this category, three Walt Disney films (1937's Snow White and the Seven Dwarfs, 1988's Who Framed Roger Rabbit, and 1995's Toy Story) were all given Special Achievement Academy Awards.

=== Box office performance of nominated films ===
At the time of the nominations announcement on February 12, the combined gross of the five Best Picture nominees at the US box office was $484 million, with an average of $96.9 million per film. The Lord of the Rings: The Fellowship of the Ring was the highest earner among the Best Picture nominees with $271 million in domestic box office receipts. The film was followed by A Beautiful Mind ($113 million), Moulin Rouge! ($57.1 million), Gosford Park ($22.2 million), and finally In the Bedroom ($19.5 million).

Of the top 50 grossing movies of the year, 46 nominations went to 14 films on the list. Only The Lord of the Rings: The Fellowship of the Ring (2nd), Shrek (3rd), Monsters, Inc. (4th), A Beautiful Mind (15th), Black Hawk Down (25th), Jimmy Neutron: Boy Genius (27th), Training Day (29th), Bridget Jones's Diary (31st), Ali (41st), and Moulin Rouge! (44th) were nominated for Best Picture, Best Animated Feature, or any of the directing, acting, or screenwriting awards. The other top-50 box office hits that earned nominations were Harry Potter and the Sorcerer's Stone (1st), Pearl Harbor (7th), Vanilla Sky (19th), and AI: Artificial Intelligence (28th).

=== Critical reviews ===
The show received a mixed reception from media publications. Some media outlets were more critical of the show. Television critic Robert Bianco of USA Today complained that the awards ceremony was "intensely narcissistic and characteristically, almost unrelievedly, dull." Columnist Matthew Gilbert of The Boston Globe bemoaned that "TV's most-watched slug crawled back into town last night." He also sniped, "As usual, the technical awards formed a Bermuda Triangle in the middle of the show, and the film-clip fests and production numbers numbed our brains." The Sacramento Bee's Rick Kishman lamented that "It was the first time both best-acting Oscars went to African Americans...yet viewers had to fight hours and hours of boredom to care." He also quipped that the excessive amount of montage and tributes dragged down the proceedings.

Other media outlets received the broadcast more positively. Orange County Register film critic Henry Sheehan praised Goldberg's performance as hosting writing that her "ensuing entrance a la Moulin Rouge was a comparative triumph and her boom-boom-boom succession of jokes put the show right on track." Television columnist Joanne Ostrow of The Denver Post raved, "The nearly five-hour telecast was stunning, historic, slick, efficient, and helped along by some knockout clothes." She also commented that Washington and Berry's acceptance speeches and the Sidney Poitier tribute added to the historic and emotional mood of the festivities. John Levesque of the Seattle Post-Intelligencer commended producer Ziskin for producing "the best Oscar telecast this TV watcher can remember." In addition, he wrote that "It was clear the 74th Academy Awards ceremony was something special: fresh, crisp, different from its predecessors."

=== Ratings and reception ===
The American telecast on ABC drew in an average of 41.82 million people over its length, which was a 3% decrease from the previous year's ceremony. An estimated 77 million total viewers watched all or part of the awards. The show also earned lower Nielsen ratings compared to the previous ceremony with 25.54% of households watching over a 40.34 share, which was the lowest rating in Oscars history. In addition, it garnered a lower 18–49 demo rating with a 16.13 rating over a 36.46 share among viewers in that demographic.

In July 2002, the ceremony presentation received seven nominations at the 54th Primetime Emmys. Two months later, the ceremony won one of those nominations for Debra Brown's choreography during the telecast.

== "In Memoriam" ==
The annual "In Memoriam" tribute, presented by actor Kevin Spacey, honored the following people.

- Jack Lemmon – Actor
- Nigel Hawthorne – Actor
- Beatrice Straight – Actress
- Eileen Heckart – Actress
- Jason Miller – Actor, writer
- Ann Sothern – Actress
- Harold Russell – Actor
- Kim Stanley – Actress
- Michael Ritchie – Director
- Ted Demme – Director
- Budd Boetticher – Director
- Hiroshi Teshigahara – Director
- Herbert Ross – Director
- Julia Phillips – Producer
- Jay Livingston – Composer
- William Hanna – Producer
- Chuck Jones – Animator
- Samuel Z. Arkoff – Producer
- Danilo Donati – Costume designer
- Sacha Vierny – Cinematographer
- John A. Alonzo – Cinematographer
- Carroll O'Connor – Actor
- Aaliyah – Actress
- George Harrison – Producer, composer, actor
- Anthony Quinn – Actor

Before the In Memoriam montage was shown, Spacey requested a moment of silence in memory of the victims of the September 11 attacks.

== See also ==
- 8th Screen Actors Guild Awards
- 22nd Golden Raspberry Awards
- 44th Grammy Awards
- 54th Primetime Emmy Awards
- 55th British Academy Film Awards
- 56th Tony Awards
- 59th Golden Globe Awards
- List of submissions to the 74th Academy Awards for Best Foreign Language Film
- List of Academy Award records

== Bibliography ==
- Levy, Emanuel (2003). All About Oscar: The History and Politics of the Academy Awards. New York, United States: Continuum International Publishing Group. ISBN 0-8264-1452-4.
- Osborne, Robert (2013). 85 Years of the Oscar: The Complete History of the Academy Awards. New York, United States: Abbeville Publishing Group. ISBN 978-0-7892-1142-2.
- Pond, Steve (2005), The Big Show: High Times and Dirty Dealings Backstage at the Academy Awards, New York, United States: Faber and Faber, ISBN 0-571-21193-3
