= Leriche =

Leriche is a French-language surname. It may refer to:

- Chloé Leriche, Canadian film director from Quebec
- Guillaume Leriche (born 1975), French sound engineer
- Lucy Leriche, American politician
- René Leriche (1879-1955), French vascular surgeon and physiologist
- Samantha Leriche-Gionet (born 1985), Canadian animator, illustrator, and comic strip author
