= Café des 2 Moulins =

Coordinates: 48°53′5.75″N 2°20′1″E

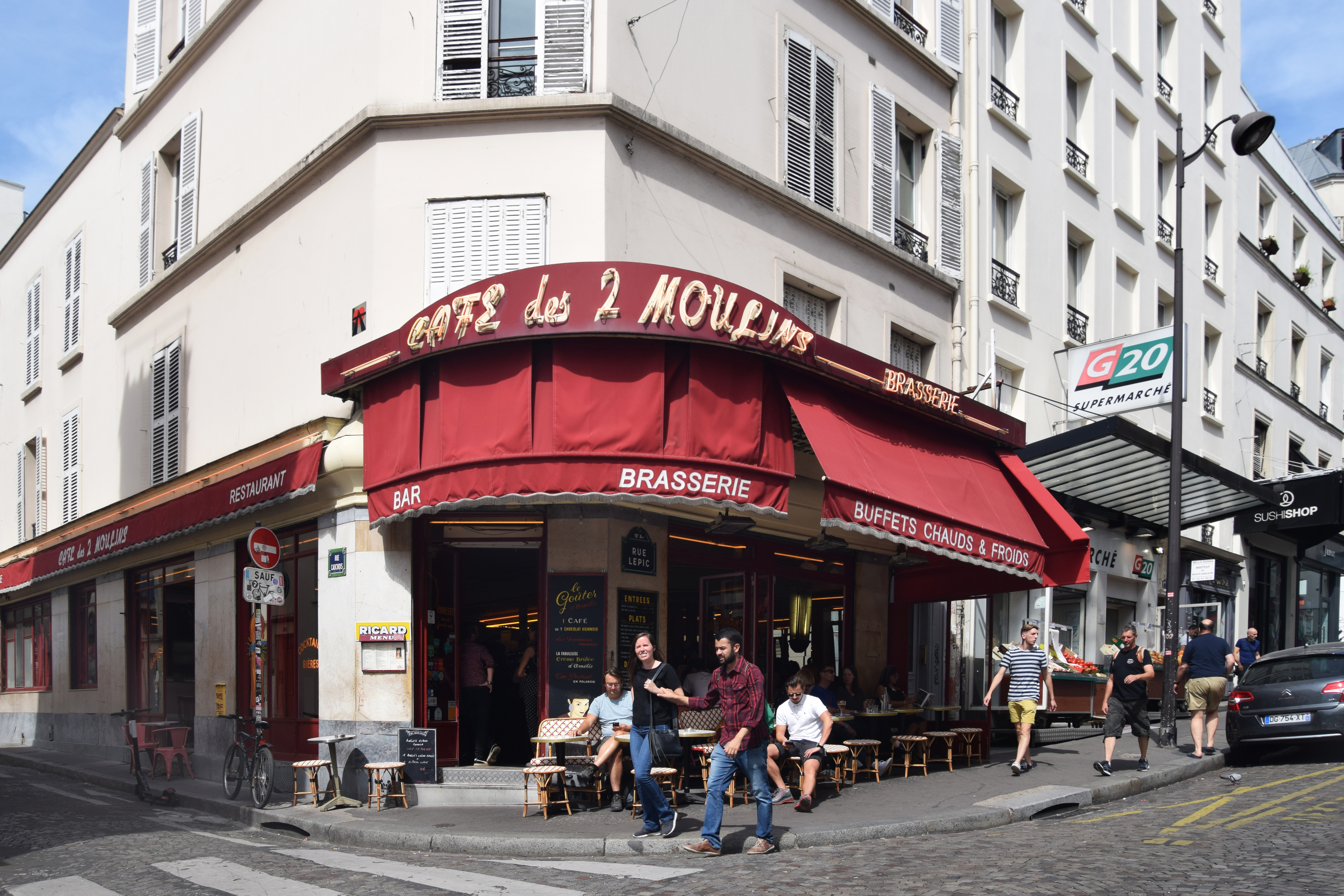
- Interactive map of Café des 2 Moulins

Restaurant information
- Location: 15, rue Lepic, Paris, 75018, France

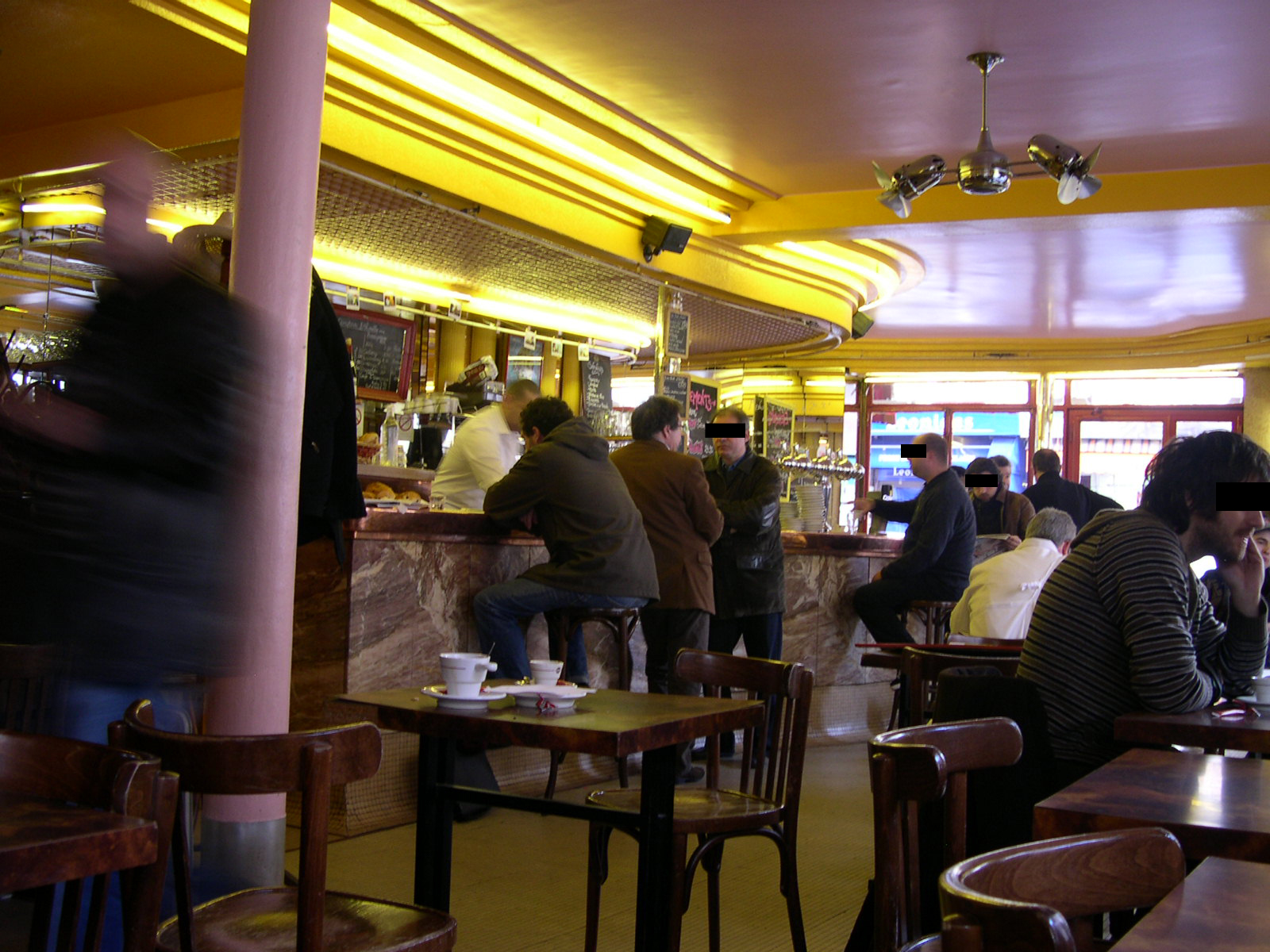
Inside the Café

The Café des 2 Moulins (French pronunciation: [kafe de dø mulɛ̃], "Café of the Two Windmills") is a café in the Montmartre area of Paris, located at the junction of Rue Lepic and Rue Cauchois (the precise address is 15, rue Lepic, 75018 Paris). It takes its name from the two nearby historical windmills, Moulin Rouge and Moulin de la Galette. The interior consists of a bar area and multiple small tables.

The café has gained considerable fame since its appearance in the 2001 film Amélie, in which it is the workplace of the title character. It has since become a popular tourist destination. Another location from the film, the convenience store of Collignon, is located nearby, on the rue des Trois-Frères. The tobacco counter, tended in the film by Georgette (played by Isabelle Nanty), was removed in 2002 when the café changed ownership.

The café was listed in the Registre du commerce et des sociétés in 1964. According to Marc Fougedoire, the current owner, the establishment opened at the beginning of the 20th century, but did not take its current name until the 1950s. It had already been used for two other films before it was in Amélie.
