= Hélène Dubreuil =

French set decorator

- Born: May 14, 1967 (age 59); France
- Occupation: Set decorator
- Years active: 1994-present

Hélène Dubreuil (born 14 May 1967) is a French set decorator. In 2012, she was nominated for an Academy Award for the film Midnight in Paris. She shared her nomination with Anne Seibel.
