= Anne Seibel =

French art director

- Occupation: Art director
- Years active: 1984-present

Anne Seibel is a French art director. On 24 January 2012 she was nominated for an Academy Award for the film Midnight in Paris in the category of Best Art Direction. She shared her nomination with Hélène Dubreuil.
