= Sélim Azzazi =

French sound editor, film director and producer

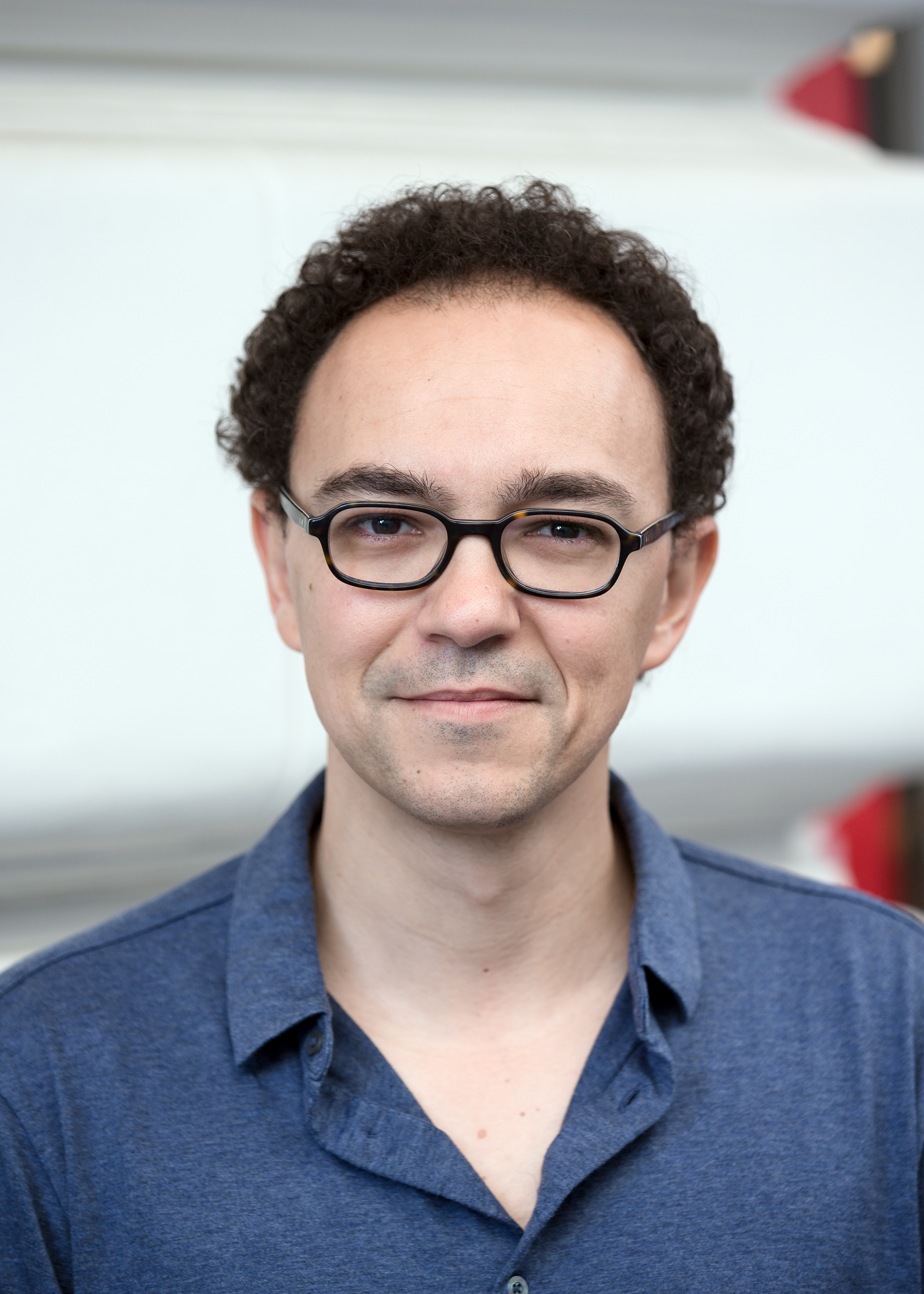
Sélim Azzazi (VIS 2016)

Sélim Azzazi is a French sound editor, producer and director. Best known for his work on Ennemis intérieurs as director, which earned him critical appraisal and recognition including Academy Award for Best Live Action Short Film at the 89th Academy Awards in 2017.

== Awards ==
- Nominated: Academy Award for Best Live Action Short Film - Ennemis intérieurs
