= Hu Wei (director) =

Chinese filmmaker

Hu Wei (Chinese: 胡伟; pinyin: Hú Wěi; born 1983 in Beijing) is a Chinese filmmaker.

== Biography ==
Hu Wei studied art at the Ecole Nationale Supérieure des Beaux-Arts de Paris ENSBA, as well as at Le Fresnoy - Studio national des arts contemporains in northern France.

His short film Butter Lamp (La lampe au beurre de yak) enjoyed great international success, premiering in the Critics' Week section at the Cannes Film Festival in 2013 and subsequently screening at numerous other festivals, including the Rotterdam and Sundance Film Festivals, and winning more than 70 awards, including an Academy Award nomination for best live action short film.

In 2014-15, he was a fellow at the Villa Médicis - Académie de France in Rome. In 2015, he participated in the «Next Step» program of Critics' Week at Cannes.

His next short film, What tears us apart (Ce qui nous éloigne), starring Isabelle Huppert, premiered at the Venice International Film Festival in 2016.

Hu Wei lives and works in China and France.

== Filmography ==
- 2012: Le propriétaire (short film)
- 2013: Butter Lamp (La lampe au beurre de yak, short film)
- 2016: What tears us apart (Ce qui nous éloigne, short film)

== Awards ==
=== Butter Lamp (a selection) ===
- 2013: Critics' Week (Cannes), Discovery Award (nomination)
- 2013: International Short Film Festival Winterthur, Main award of the international competition as well as audience award
- 2013: European Film Award: best short film (nomination)
- 2014: Clermont-Ferrand International Short Film Festival, Grand Prix
- 2015: Academy Awards, Best Live Action Short Film (nomination)
