= Lucy Leriche =

American politician (born 1963)

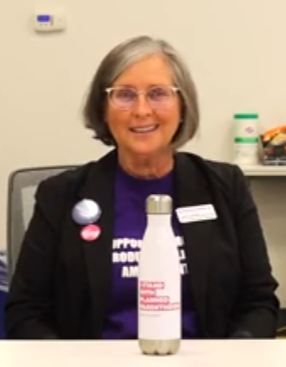
- In a panel discussion in 2022

Member of the Vermont House of Representatives from the Caledonia-2 district
- In office 2005–2013

Personal details
- Born: August 4, 1963 (age 63)
- Party: Democratic
- Education: Johnson State College; Arizona State University

Lucy Leriche (born August 4, 1963) is an American politician from Vermont who was a Democratic member of the Vermont House of Representatives for the Caledonia-2 District from 2005 to 2013. She was vice president of public affairs for Planned Parenthood Vermont Action Fund.

== See also ==
- Members of the Vermont House of Representatives, 2005–06 session
- Members of the Vermont House of Representatives, 2007–08 session
