= Ennemis intérieurs =

- Film poster
- Directed by: Sélim Azzazi
- Written by: Sélim Azzazi
- Produced by: Sélim Azzazi; Frédéric Serve; Benjamin de Lajarte
- Production company: Qualia Films
- Release date: 5 February 2016 (Clermont-Ferrand International Short Film Festival)
- Running time: 27 minutes
- Country: France

Ennemis intérieurs (English: Enemies Within) is a French drama short film directed and written by Sélim Azzazi. It received critical appraisal and was nominated for many industry awards including Academy Award for Best Live Action Short Film at the 89th Academy Awards in 2017.

== Synopsis ==
An interview at a local police station turns into an inquisition during which a French-Algerian born man sees himself accused of protecting the identities of possible terrorists. This close-up on France's troubled history with its former colonies has one man controlling the fate of another with the stroke of a pen during a turbulent period in the 1990s.

== Cast ==
- Hassam Ghancy as Le demandeur
- Najib Oudghiri as L'interrogateur
- Stéphane Perrichon as Le gardien de la paix
- Nasser Azazi as Le père
- Amine Brossier as Le fils
- Farès Azazi as Jeune homme arrêté

== Awards ==
Awards for Ennemis intérieurs
| Year | Association | Award Category | Status |
| 2017 | Academy Awards | Best Live Action Short Film | Nominated |
| 2016 | Clermont-Ferrand International Short Film Festival | National Audience Award; Youth Jury Prize | Won |
| 2016 | Newport Beach Film Festival | Best Narrative Short | Won |
| 2016 | Vienna Independent Shorts | Best International Short Film | Won |
