= Butter Lamp =

2013 film

- Film poster for Butter Lamp
- Directed by: Hu Wei
- Written by: Hu Wei
- Produced by: Yangxu Zhou; Julien Féret
- Edited by: Hu Wei
- Release date: 20 May 2013 (Cannes)
- Running time: 15 minutes
- Countries: China; France
- Language: Tibetan

Butter Lamp (simplified Chinese: 酥油灯; traditional Chinese: 酥油燈; pinyin: Sūyóu Dēng; French: La lampe au beurre de yak) is a 2013 Chinese-French short drama film directed by Hu Wei. It was nominated for the Academy Award for Best Live Action Short Film at the 87th Academy Awards. The film was shot in a single location and with an entire cast of non-professional actors.

== Cast ==
- Genden Punstock
- Soepha
- Sonam Gonpo
- Wangmo Tso
- Kalsang Dolma
- Zirang Lhamo
- Gangrong Dorjee
- Leung Tso
- Sonam Tashi
- Yang Tso
