= Marie-Laure Valla =

French set dresser and set decorator

- Occupation: Set decorator
- Years active: 1993-present

Marie-Laure Valla is a French set dresser and set decorator. She was nominated for the Academy Award for Best Art Direction for her work in Amélie (2001).
