= Amélie =

2001 film by Jean-Pierre Jeunet

- Theatrical release poster
- French: Le Fabuleux Destin d'Amélie Poulain
- Directed by: Jean-Pierre Jeunet
- Screenplay by: Guillaume Laurant
- Story by: Guillaume Laurant; Jean-Pierre Jeunet
- Produced by: Jean-Marc Deschamps; Claudie Ossard
- Starring: Audrey Tautou; Mathieu Kassovitz; Rufus; Lorella Cravotta; Serge Merlin; Jamel Debbouze; Claire Maurier; Clotilde Mollet; Isabelle Nanty; Dominique Pinon; Artus de Penguern; Yolande Moreau; Urbain Cancelier; Maurice Bénichou
- Cinematography: Bruno Delbonnel
- Edited by: Hervé Schneid
- Music by: Yann Tiersen
- Production companies: Claudie Ossard Productions; UGC; Victoires Productions; Tapioca Films; France 3 Cinéma; MMC Independent; Sofica Sofinergie 5; Film- und Medienstiftung NRW; Canal+
- Distributed by: UGC Fox Distribution (France); Prokino Filmverleih (Germany)
- Release dates: 25 April 2001 (France); 16 August 2001 (Germany)
- Running time: 123 minutes
- Countries: France; Germany
- Language: French
- Budget: $10 million
- Box office: $174.4 million

Amélie (French: Le Fabuleux Destin d'Amélie Poulain, pronounced [lə fabylø dɛstɛ̃ d‿ameli pulɛ̃], lit. 'The Fabulous Destiny of Amélie Poulain') is a 2001 French-language romantic comedy film directed by Jean-Pierre Jeunet. Written by Jeunet with Guillaume Laurant, the film is a whimsical depiction of contemporary Parisian life, set in Montmartre. It tells the story of Amélie Poulain, played by Audrey Tautou, a shy and quirky waitress who decides to change the lives of those around her for the better while dealing with her own isolation. The film features an ensemble cast of supporting roles, including Mathieu Kassovitz, Rufus, Lorella Cravotta, Serge Merlin, Jamel Debbouze, Claire Maurier, Clotilde Mollet, Isabelle Nanty, Dominique Pinon, Artus de Penguern, Yolande Moreau, Urbain Cancelier, and Maurice Bénichou.

Amélie was released theatrically in France on 25 April 2001 by UGC-Fox Distribution and in Germany on 16 August 2001 by Prokino Filmverleih. The film received widespread critical acclaim, with praise for Tautou's performance, the cinematography, visuals, production design, sound design, editing, musical score, writing and Jeunet's direction. Amélie won Best Film at the European Film Awards, four César Awards, including Best Film and Best Director, and two British Academy Film Awards, including Best Original Screenplay. It was nominated for five Academy Awards, including Best Foreign Language Film and Best Original Screenplay. The film was a major commercial success, grossing $174.2 million worldwide against a budget of $10 million, and is one of the biggest international successes for a French film.

== Plot ==
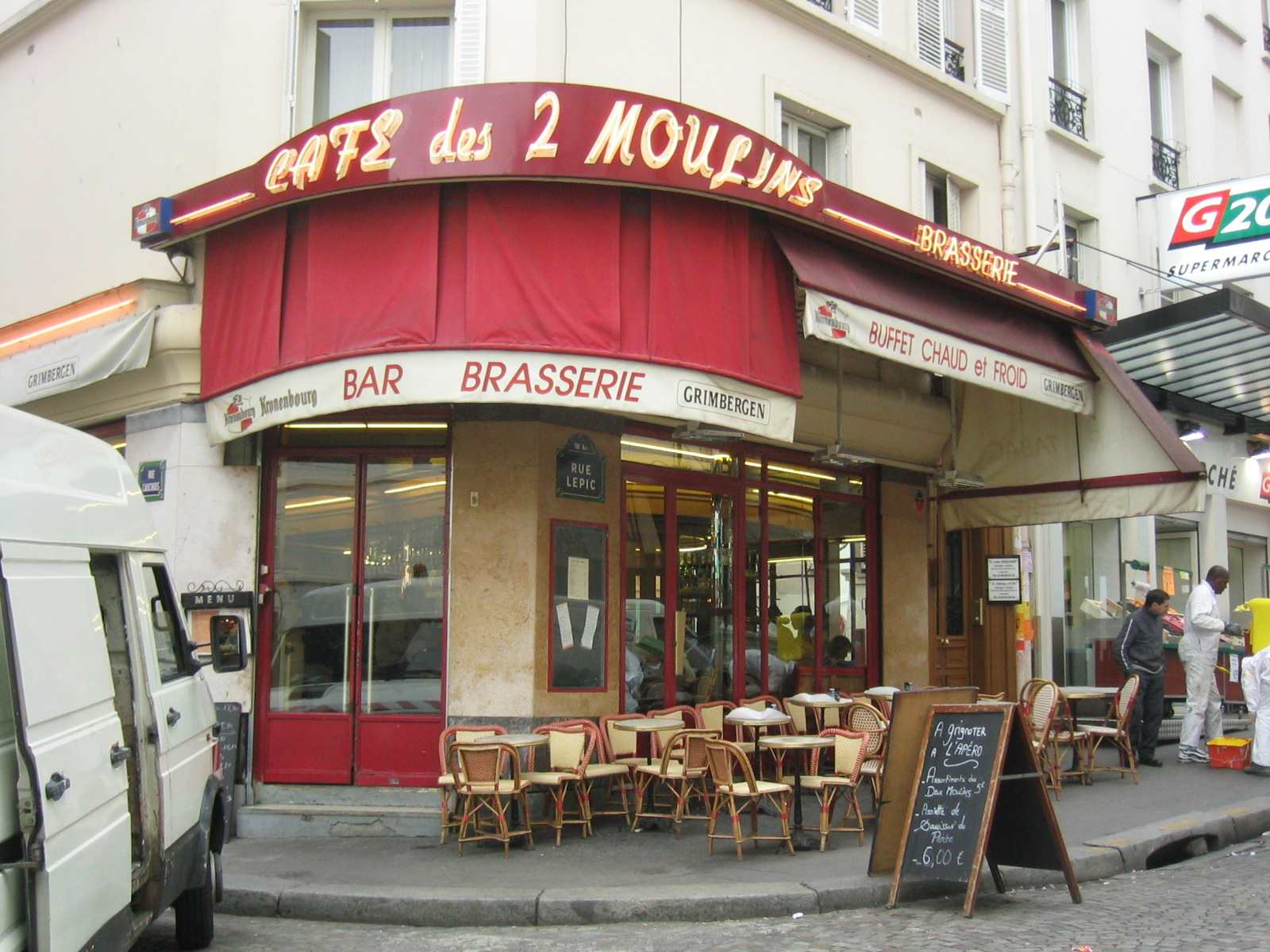
Amélie works at the Café des 2 Moulins on Montmartre.

Amélie Poulain is born in 1974 and brought up by eccentric parents who – incorrectly believing that she has a heart defect – decide to homeschool her. To cope with her loneliness, Amélie develops an active imagination and a mischievous personality. When Amélie is six, her mother, Amandine, is killed when a suicidal Canadian tourist jumps from the roof of Notre-Dame de Paris and lands on her. As a result, her father, Raphaël, withdraws more and more from society. Amélie leaves home at the age of 18 and becomes a waitress at the Café des 2 Moulins in Montmartre, which is staffed and frequented by a collection of eccentrics. She is single and lets her imagination roam freely, finding contentment in simple pleasures like dipping her hand into grain sacks, cracking crème brûlée with a spoon, and skipping stones along the Canal Saint-Martin.

On 31 August 1997, startled by the news of the death of Diana, Princess of Wales, Amélie drops a plastic perfume-stopper, which dislodges a wall tile and accidentally reveals an old metal box which contains childhood memorabilia hidden by a boy who lived in her apartment decades earlier. Amélie resolves to track down the boy and return the box to him. She promises herself that if it makes him happy, she will devote her life to bringing happiness to others.

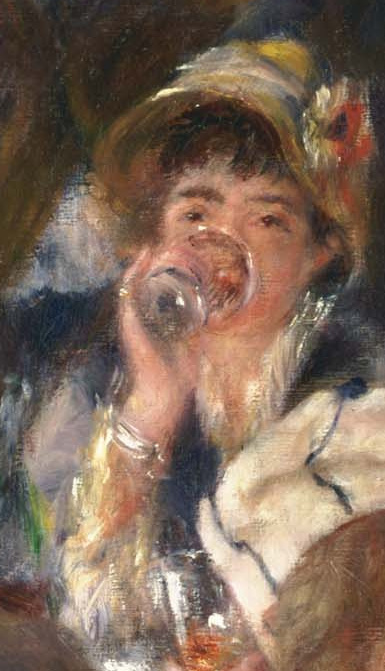
A girl in Renoir's 1881 painting Luncheon of the Boating Party provides a key plot point.

After asking the apartment's concierge and several old tenants about the boy's identity, Amélie meets her reclusive neighbour, Raymond Dufayel, an artist with brittle bone disease who replicates Pierre-Auguste Renoir's 1881 painting Luncheon of the Boating Party every year. He recalls the boy's name as "Bretodeau". Amélie finds the man, Dominique Bretodeau, and surreptitiously gives him the box. Moved to tears by the discovery and the memories it holds, Bretodeau resolves to reconcile with his estranged daughter and the grandson he has never met. Amélie happily embarks on her new mission.

Amélie secretly executes complex schemes that positively affect the lives of those around her. She escorts a blind man to the Métro station while giving him a rich description of the street scenes he passes. She persuades her father to follow his dream of touring the world by stealing his garden gnome and having a flight attendant friend mail pictures of it posing with landmarks from all over the world. She starts a romance between her hypochondriacal co-worker Georgette and Joseph, a patron of the café. She convinces Madeleine Wallace, the concierge of her block of flats, that the husband who abandoned her had sent her a final conciliatory love letter just before his accidental death years before. She plays practical jokes on Collignon, the nasty greengrocer. Mentally exhausted, Collignon no longer abuses his meek, good-natured assistant Lucien. A delighted Lucien subsequently takes charge at the grocery stand.

Dufayel, having observed Amélie, begins a conversation with her about his painting. Although he has copied the same Renoir painting 20 times, he has never quite captured the look of the girl drinking a glass of water. They discuss the meaning of this character, and over several conversations, Amélie begins projecting her loneliness onto the image. Dufayel recognizes this and uses the girl in the painting to push Amélie to examine her attraction to a quirky young man, Nino Quincampoix, who collects the discarded photographs of strangers from passport photo booths. When Amélie bumps into Nino a second time, she realizes she is falling in love with him. He accidentally drops a photo album in the street. Amélie retrieves it.

Amélie plays a cat-and-mouse game with Nino around Paris before returning his treasured album anonymously. After arranging a meeting at the 2 Moulins, Amélie panics and tries to deny her identity. Her co-worker, Gina, concerned for Amélie's well-being, screens Nino for her; Joseph's comment about this misleads Amélie to believe she has lost Nino to Gina. It takes Dufayel's insight to give her the courage to pursue Nino, resulting in a romantic night together and the beginning of a relationship. The film ends as Amélie experiences a moment of happiness she has found for herself.

== Cast ==
- Audrey Tautou as Amélie Poulain
  - Flora Guiet as young Amélie
- Mathieu Kassovitz as Nino Quincampoix
  - Amaury Babault as young Nino
- Rufus as Raphaël Poulain, Amélie's father
- Lorella Cravotta as Amandine Poulain, Amélie's mother
- Serge Merlin as Raymond Dufayel, "The Glass Man"
- Jamel Debbouze as Lucien, the grocer's assistant
- Clotilde Mollet as Gina, a fellow waitress
- Claire Maurier as Suzanne, the owner of the Café des 2 Moulins
- Isabelle Nanty as Georgette, the resident hypochondriac
- Dominique Pinon as Joseph
- Artus de Penguern as Hipolito, the writer
- Yolande Moreau as Madeleine Wallace (Wells, in the original English subtitles)
- Urbain Cancelier as Collignon, the grocer
- Maurice Bénichou as Dominique Bretodeau
  - Kevin Fernandes as young Dominique
- Michel Robin as Mr. Collignon
- Andrée Damant as Mrs. Collignon
- Claude Perron as Eva, Nino's colleague
- Armelle as Philomène, an air hostess
- Ticky Holgado as the man in a photo
- André Dussollier as the narrator
- Fabienne Chaudat as the woman in a coma
- Manoush as the nymphomaniac (uncredited)

== Production ==
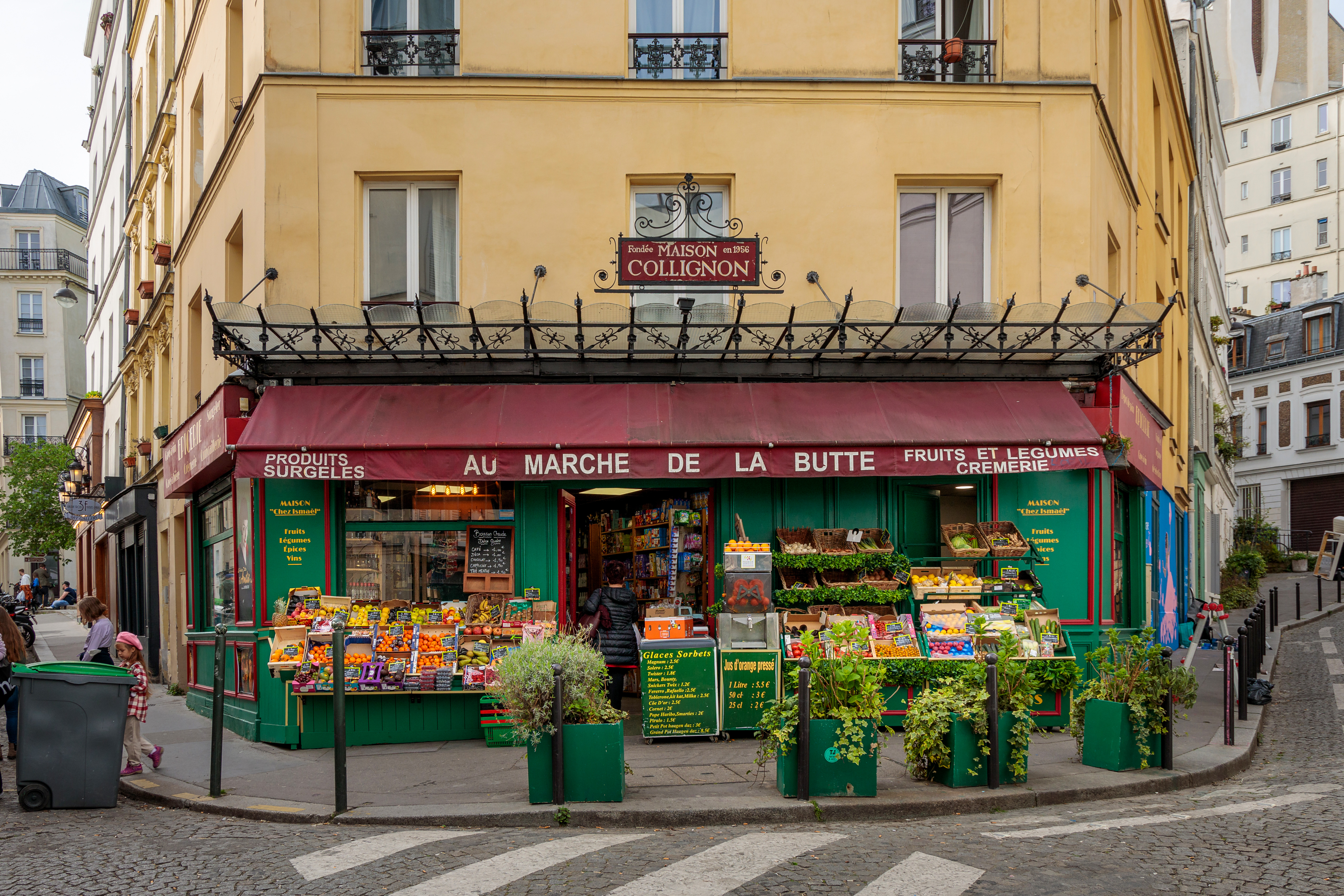
Au Marché de la Butte, Rue des Trois Frères, Paris, used as the location of Maison Collignon

Jeunet originally wrote the role of Amélie for the English actress Emily Watson. However, Watson's French was not strong, and turned it down, Jeunet rewrote the screenplay for a French actress. Audrey Tautou was the first actress he auditioned having seen her on the poster for the 1999 film Venus Beauty Institute.

Filming took place mainly in Paris. The Café des 2 Moulins (15 Rue Lepic, Montmartre, Paris) where Amélie works is a real café. Principal photography took place from 2 March 2000 to 7 July 2000.

The filmmakers made use of computer-generated imagery (including computer animation) and a digital intermediate. The studio scenes were filmed in the MMC Studios Coloneum in Cologne (Germany). The film shares many of the themes in its plot with the second half of the 1994 film Chungking Express.

== Release ==
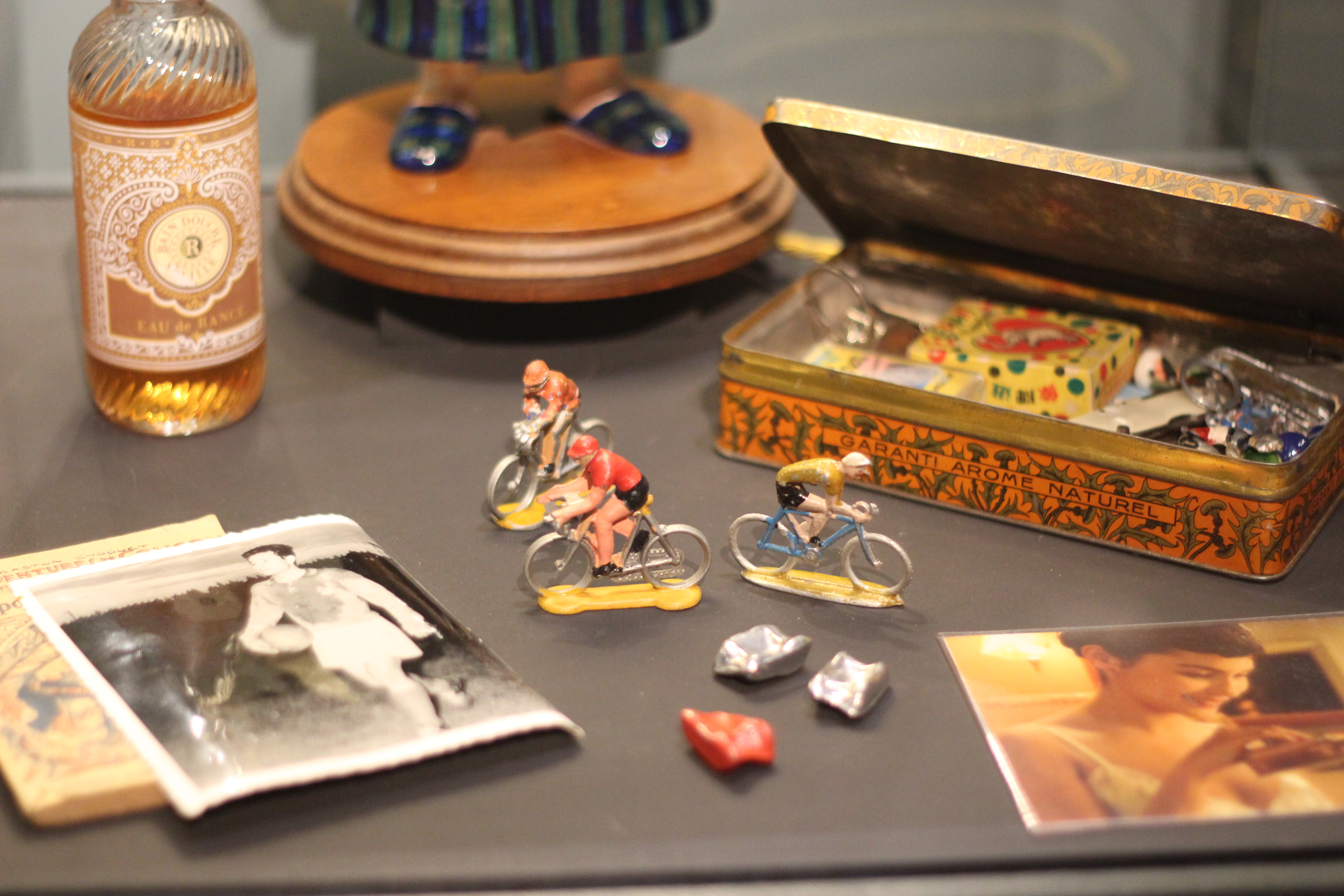
Props of the childhood souvenirs of Dominique Bretodeau that Amélie finds in the metal box in her apartment wall, and a photograph of Amélie holding the box.

The film was released in France, Belgium, and French-speaking western Switzerland in April 2001, with subsequent screenings at various film festivals followed by releases around the world. It received limited releases in North America, the United Kingdom, and Australasia later in 2001.

Cannes Film Festival selector Gilles Jacob described Amélie as "uninteresting", and therefore it was not screened at the festival, although the version he viewed was an early cut without music. The absence of Amélie at the festival caused something of a controversy because of the warm welcome by the French media and audience in contrast with the reaction of the selector. David Martin-Jones, in an article in Senses of Cinema, stated that the film "[wears] its national [French] identity on its sleeve" and that this attracted both audiences of mainstream films and those of arthouse ones.

=== Subsequent re-releases ===
In 2021, Newen Connect's TF1 Studio signed a deal with UGC for international distribution and sales rights to its films, including Amélie. The film was then re-released in multiple countries for its 20th anniversary, including on 11 May 2021 in Italy, by BIM Distribuzione.

The film's U.S. distributor Miramax was sold to Qatari company beIN Media Group in 2016. Then in 2020, beIN sold a 49% stake in Miramax to ViacomCBS (now known as Paramount Skydance), with this deal giving them the rights to Miramax's film catalog. In 2021, Paramount went on to reissue Amélie on home media, along with many other Miramax titles they had acquired.

In February 2022, while discussing the legacy of Amélie in an interview with The New York Times, Jeunet stated that U.S. distribution rights to the film, held by Miramax (and later Paramount), had been acquired by Sony Pictures Classics, with the company planning a re-release in the future. While the distributor did confirm this news, no further developments were reported until late December 2023, when Sony announced their acquisition of distribution rights to the film for North America excluding French Canada and scheduled the film for a theatrical re-release in 250 theatres in the United States on 14 February 2024. Some sources report Miramax/Paramount as still controlling certain international rights to Amélie, and Miramax continues to list the film in its library on its official website.

To mark the film's 25th anniversary, Curzon Film re-released it in UK and Irish cinemas on 3 April 2026.

== Reception ==
=== Critical response ===
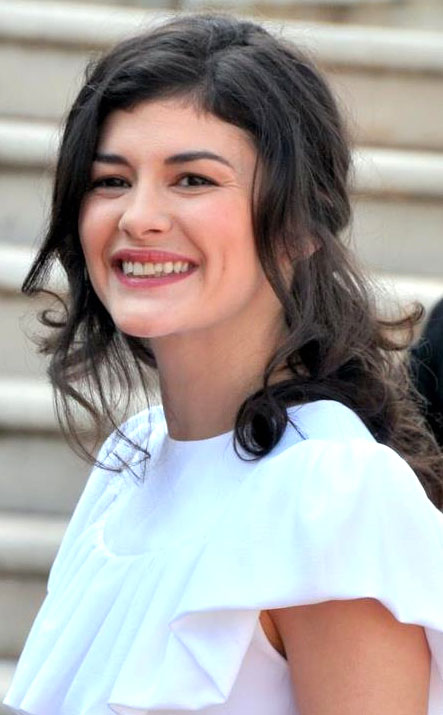
Tautou's performance was acclaimed and earned her César and BAFTA nominations for Best Actress.

On the review aggregator website Rotten Tomatoes, the film holds a 90% approval rating based on 234 reviews, with an average rating of 8.2/10. The website's critics consensus reads, "The feel-good Amélie is a lively, fanciful charmer, showcasing Audrey Tautou as its delightful heroine." Metacritic, which uses a weighted average, assigned the film a score of 69 out of 100, based on 31 critics, indicating "generally favorable" reviews.

Alan Morrison from Empire magazine gave Amélie five stars and called it "one of the year's best, with crossover potential along the lines of Cyrano de Bergerac (1990) and Il Postino (1994). Given its quirky heart, it might well surpass them all". Paul Tatara of CNN praised Amélie's playful nature. In his review, he wrote, "Its whimsical, free-ranging nature is often enchanting; the first hour, in particular, is brimming with amiable, sardonic laughs."

The film was criticised by critic Serge Kaganski of Les Inrockuptibles for an unrealistic and picturesque vision of a bygone French society with few ethnic minorities. Jeunet dismissed the criticism by pointing out that the photo collection contains pictures of people from numerous ethnic backgrounds, and that Jamel Debbouze, who plays Lucien, is of Moroccan descent.

=== Box office ===
The film opened on 432 screens in France and grossed 43.2 million French Franc ($6.2 million) in its opening week, placing it at number one. It stayed in the top 10 for 22 weeks. It was the highest-grossing film in France for the year with a gross of $41 million. The film also grossed $33 million in the United States and Canada theatrically, making it the highest-grossing French-language film of all time in North America.

=== Accolades ===
Award	Category	Recipient	Result
Academy Awards	Best Foreign Language Film	France	Nominated
Academy Awards	Best Original Screenplay	Guillaume Laurant and Jean-Pierre Jeunet	Nominated
Academy Awards	Best Art Direction	Aline Bonetto and Marie-Laure Valla	Nominated
Academy Awards	Best Cinematography	Bruno Delbonnel	Nominated
Academy Awards	Best Sound	Vincent Arnardi, Guillaume Leriche, Jean Umansky	Nominated
British Academy Film Awards	Best Film	Amélie	Nominated
British Academy Film Awards	Best Direction	Jean-Pierre Jeunet	Nominated
British Academy Film Awards	Best Actress in a Leading Role	Audrey Tautou	Nominated
British Academy Film Awards	Best Original Screenplay	Guillaume Laurant and Jean-Pierre Jeunet	Won
British Academy Film Awards	Best Cinematography	Bruno Delbonnel	Nominated
British Academy Film Awards	Best Production Design	Aline Bonetto	Won
British Academy Film Awards	Best Editing	Hervé Schneid	Nominated
British Academy Film Awards	Best Film Music	Yann Tiersen	Nominated
British Academy Film Awards	Best Film Not in the English Language	Amélie	Nominated
César Awards	Best Film	Amélie	Won
César Awards	Best Director	Jean-Pierre Jeunet	Won
César Awards	Best Actress	Audrey Tautou	Nominated
César Awards	Best Supporting Actor	Jamel Debbouze	Nominated
César Awards	Best Supporting Actor	Rufus	Nominated
César Awards	Best Supporting Actress	Isabelle Nanty	Nominated
César Awards	Best Original Screenplay or Adaptation	Guillaume Laurant and Jean-Pierre Jeunet	Nominated
César Awards	Best Cinematography	Bruno Delbonnel	Nominated
César Awards	Best Production Design	Aline Bonetto	Won
César Awards	Best Costume Design	Madeline Fontaine	Nominated
César Awards	Best Editing	Hervé Schneid	Nominated
César Awards	Best Music	Yann Tiersen	Won
European Film Awards	Best Film	Jean-Pierre Jeunet	Won
European Film Awards	Best Director	Jean-Pierre Jeunet	Won
European Film Awards	Best Actress	Audrey Tautou	Nominated
European Film Awards	Best Cinematography	Bruno Delbonnel	Won
French Syndicate of Cinema Critics	Best French Film	Amélie	Won
Golden Eagle Award	Best Foreign Language Film	Amélie	Won
Golden Globe Awards	Best Foreign Language Film	Jean-Pierre Jeunet	Nominated
Karlovy Vary International Film Festival	Crystal Globe	Jean-Pierre Jeunet	Won
Toronto International Film Festival	People's Choice Award	Amélie	Won

Amélie was selected by The New York Times as one of "The Best 1,000 Movies Ever Made". The film placed No. 2 in Empire magazine's "The 100 Best Films of World Cinema". Paste magazine ranked it second on its list of the 50 Best Movies of the Decade (2000–2009). In August 2016, BBC Magazine conducted a poll on the 21st century's 100 greatest films so far, with Amélie ranking at number 87.

Entertainment Weekly named the film poster one of the best on its list of the top 25 film posters in the past 25 years. It also named Amélie setting up a wild goose chase for her beloved Nino all through Paris as No. 9 on its list of top 25 Romantic Gestures. In 2010, an online public poll by the American Cinematographer – the house journal of the American Society of Cinematographers – named Amélie the best shot film of the decade.

Amélie is rated 37 among the 50 Greatest Romantic Comedies of All Time by Rolling Stone magazine. In 2021, members of Writers Guild of America West (WGAW) and Writers Guild of America, East (WGAE) voted its screenplay 43th in WGA’s 101 Greatest Screenplays of the 21st Century (So Far).

In 2025, the film ranked number 41 on The New York Times' list of "The 100 Best Movies of the 21st Century" and number 46 on the "Readers' Choice" edition of the list.

In 2007, The Guardian polled its readers on the "greatest foreign films of all time" and Amelie placed second. The verdict of The Guardian's critics states: "Forget La Regle du Jeu; forget L'Atalante; forget Abel Gance's Napoleon; If there's a single film that defines France in the eyes of the Guardian readership, it's this hyperactive magical-realist tale from the Gallic answer to Tim Burton, Jean-Pierre Jeunet."

== Soundtrack ==
The soundtrack to Amélie was composed by Yann Tiersen.

== Musical adaptation ==
On 23 August 2013, composer Dan Messe, one of the founders and members of the band Hem, confirmed speculation that he would be writing the score for a musical adaptation of Amélie, collaborating with Craig Lucas and Nathan Tysen. Messe also confirmed he would be composing all original music for the show and not using the Yann Tiersen score. The musical adaptation premiered at the Berkeley Repertory Theater in August 2015. It opened on Broadway in March 2017 and closed in May 2017. The production started its pre-Broadway engagement at the Ahmanson Theatre in Los Angeles in December 2016, with Phillipa Soo in the title role. A London production opened in 2020, with Australian, German, Dutch, and Finnish productions set to open or resume pending the cessation of restrictions due to the COVID-19 pandemic.

Jeunet has distanced himself from the musical due to his distaste for the art form, saying he only sold the rights to raise funds for children's charity "Mécénat Chirurgie Cardiaque".

== Home media ==
The film has no overall worldwide distributor, but Blu-ray Discs have been released in Canada and Australia. The first release occurred in Canada in September 2008 by TVA Films. This version did not contain any English subtitles and received criticisms regarding picture quality. In November 2009, an Australian release occurred. This time the version contained English subtitles and features no region coding. Momentum Pictures released a Blu-ray in the UK on 17 October 2011. Lionsgate released a U.S. Blu-ray edition in 2011, after entering a temporary agreement to distribute Miramax's library on home video. Sony Pictures issued a U.S. Blu-ray in a steelbook in 2024. The film is also available in HD on iTunes and other digital download services.

In the United Kingdom, it was 2013's tenth best-selling foreign-language film on physical home video formats, and the year's third best-selling French film (below The Intouchables and Rust and Bone).

== Legacy ==
For the 2007 television show Pushing Daisies, a "quirky fairy tale", American Broadcasting Company (ABC) sought an Amélie feel, with the same chords of "whimsy and spirit and magic". Pushing Daisies creator Bryan Fuller said Amélie is his favorite film. "All the things I love are represented in that movie", he said. "It's a movie that will make me cry based on kindness as opposed to sadness". The New York Times' review of Pushing Daisies reported "the Amélie influence on Pushing Daisies is everywhere".

A species of frog was named Cochranella amelie. The scientist who named it said: "This new species of glass frog is for Amélie, protagonist of the extraordinary movie Le Fabuleux Destin d'Amélie Poulain; a film where little details play an important role in the achievement of joie de vivre; like the important role that glass frogs and all amphibians and reptiles play in the health of our planet". The species was described in the scientific journal Zootaxa in an article entitled "An enigmatic new species of Glassfrog (Amphibia: Anura: Centrolenidae) from the Amazonian Andean slopes of Ecuador". The film is also the inspiration behind a painting game called Été where players can paint Montreal into life.

== See also ==
- Cinema of France
- List of films set in Paris
- List of French language films
- List of French submissions for the Academy Award for Best Foreign Language Film
- List of submissions to the 74th Academy Awards for Best Foreign Language Film
