= Vincent Arnardi =

French sound engineer

- Born: 10 July 1957 (age 68); Hyères, Var, France
- Occupation: Sound engineer
- Years active: 1978-present

Vincent Arnardi (born 10 July 1957) is a French sound engineer. He was nominated for an Academy Award in the category Best Sound for the film Amélie. He has worked on more than 200 films since 1978.

== Selected filmography ==
- Amélie (2001)
