= Jean Umansky =

French sound engineer

- Occupation: Sound engineer
- Years active: 1980 – present

Jean Umansky is a French sound engineer. He was nominated for an Academy Award in the category Best Sound for the film Amélie. He has worked on over 50 films since 1980.

== Selected filmography ==
- Amélie (2001)
