= Aline Bonetto =

French production designer and set decorator

- Occupation: Production designer
- Years active: 1991–present

Aline Bonetto is a French production designer and set decorator, best known for her work with Jean-Pierre Jeunet on films such as Amélie (2001), A Very Long Engagement (2004), and Micmacs (2009), among others. Her work on the first two of those films each earned her the César Award for Best Production Design, as well as nominations for the Academy Award for Best Art Direction.

She served as production designer on the DC Extended Universe film Wonder Woman (2017), as well as its sequel Wonder Woman 1984 (2020).
