= Guillaume Leriche =

French sound engineer

- Born: 6 June 1975 (age 50); Boulogne-Billancourt, France
- Occupation: Sound engineer
- Years active: 2000 – present

Guillaume Leriche (born 6 June 1975) is a French sound engineer. He was nominated for an Academy Award in the category Best Sound for the film Amélie. He has worked on over 70 films since 2000.

== Selected filmography ==
- Amélie (2001)
