= Holding the Baby =

Holding the Baby may refer to:

- Holding the Baby (British TV series), a 1997 ITV sitcom
- Holding the Baby (American TV series), a 1998 FOX sitcom
- "Holding the Baby" (Doctors), a 2004 television episode
