= Thunder and Lightning =

Thunder and Lightning may refer to:

- The physical phenomena thunder and lightning

== Music ==
- Thunder and Lightning (album), a 1983 album by Thin Lizzy
- "Thunder and Lightning" (Vukašin Brajić song), 2010
- "Thunder and Lightning" (Chicago song), 1980
- "Thunder and Lightning (Chi Coltrane song)", 1972
- "Thunder and Lightning", a song by Phil Collins from his 1981 album Face Value
- "Thunder & Lightning", a song by Motörhead from the 2015 album Bad Magic
- "Thunder and Lightning", a song by Lee "Scratch" Perry and Mad Professor from the 1995 album Super Ape Inna Jungle
- "Thunder y Lightning", a song by Bad Bunny and Eladio Carrión from the 2023 album Nadie sabe lo que va a pasar mañana
- Lightning & Thunder, a tribute act to Neil Diamond and the subject of the 2025 biopic Song Sung Blue as well as the 2008 documentary Song Sung Blue by the same name

== Other ==
- Thunder and Lightning (1938 film), a Swedish film
- Thunder and Lightning (1977 film), an American film starring David Carradine and Kate Jackson
- Thunder and Lightning (comics), comic book characters
- Thunder (comics) and Lightning (DC Comics), comic book characters
- Thunder and Lightning (professional wrestling), professional wrestling team
- Thunder & Lightning (video game), a 1990 video game published by Romstar
- "Thunder and Lightning", a variation on cream tea
- "Donner and Blitzen" (English: Thunder and Lightning), two of Santa Claus's reindeer
- Thunder and Lightning, two teams in the Rachael Heyhoe-Flint Trophy
- Thunder & Lightning: Weather Past, Present, Future, a book by Lauren Redniss

== See also ==
- Thunder Meets Lightning, a 1990 boxing fight between Julio Cesar Chavez and Meldrick Taylor
- "Lightning and Thunder," a 2024 song by Marianas Trench
