= Chicken with Plums (film) =

2011 film by Marjane Satrapi

- Theatrical release poster
- Directed by: Marjane Satrapi; Vincent Paronnaud
- Screenplay by: Marjane Satrapi; Vincent Paronnaud
- Based on: Chicken with Plums by Marjane Satrapi
- Produced by: Hengameh Panahi
- Starring: Mathieu Amalric; Edouard Baer; Maria de Medeiros; Golshifteh Farahani; Eric Caravaca; Chiara Mastroianni
- Cinematography: Christophe Beaucarne
- Edited by: Stéphane Roche
- Production companies: Celluloid Dreams; TheManipulators
- Distributed by: Le Pacte
- Release dates: 3 September 2011 (Venice); 26 October 2011 (France)
- Running time: 94 minutes
- Countries: France; Germany; Belgium
- Languages: French; English
- Budget: $9.7 million
- Box office: $3.3 million

Chicken with Plums (French: Poulet aux prunes) is a 2011 internationally co-produced comedy drama film directed by Marjane Satrapi and Vincent Paronnaud. It is based on Satrapi's graphic novel of the same name. The film premiered in competition at the 68th Venice International Film Festival on 3 September 2011. It was released in France on 26 October through Le Pacte.

== Plot ==
After Faranguisse becomes enraged at her musician husband Nasser-Ali for failing to take care of his children, she takes his violin and smashes it. Nasser-Ali then goes on a quest to find a new violin, but after purchasing a Stradivarius and attempting to play it, he realizes that he has lost his will to play and therefore to live. After contemplating various methods of suicide he finally decides to take to his bed and simply die there.

While in bed, he reflects on his life and images from his past and future play out before him. In a vision of the future his eldest daughter Lili marries a man her mother approves of, divorces him, and then has a passionate affair with an actor. After the actor dies of a heart attack, Lili smokes, drinks and becomes addicted to gambling, eventually suffering three heart attacks and dying after the third. His younger son, meanwhile, ends up in America with multiple children and becomes a grandfather after his overweight daughter goes to the hospital with stomach pains and gives birth to a son she names Jimmy-Nassar.

In the midst of his attempts to die, Faranguisse, finally concerned, cooks Nasser-Ali his favourite dish of chicken with plums. It is revealed that Faranguisse was in love with Nasser-Ali from the time she was a child, and waited for him as he became a famous musician and toured the world. Upon his return, his mother pressured him into marrying Faranguisse. Faranguisse attempts to feed Nasser-Ali the chicken with plums but he rejects it, reiterating that he will never forgive her for destroying his violin.

On the fifth day, finding himself still alive, he remembers that when his mother was dying she asked him to stop praying for her as his prayers were keeping her alive and she was in pain. When he stopped praying, her soul became a cloud of smoke that appeared over her grave. As it turns out, Nassar-Ali's youngest son is praying for him.

On the sixth day he sees the angel of death. Though he tells the angel he no longer wishes to die, the angel tells Nassar-Ali it is too late.

On the final day of his life, Nassar-Ali dreams of Irane. Nassar-Ali met Irane when he was studying the violin, and was told by his teacher that while his technique was excellent, his music lacked soul. Later Nassar-Ali saw Irane walking in the street and followed her to her father's clock store. After buying a clock from her father, he damaged it multiple times so he could return to the store and bump into her. Nassar-Ali proposes to Irane and she accepts. Her father forbids the marriage on the grounds that Nassar-Ali will be unable to financially take care of his daughter. Irane eventually complies with her father's wishes. His music teacher tells Nassar-Ali that the heartbreak he has undergone has finally transformed him into a great musician, a musician with soul, and gives him a violin that belonged to his own teaching instructor. Nassar-Ali begins a twenty-year tour of the world, while Irane marries, has a child, and becomes a grandmother just as Nassar-Ali returns, marries, and begins having children.

After buying a replacement for the violin that Faranguisse broke, Nassar-Ali runs into Irane who is walking with her grandson. After calling her name and asking if she remembers him, Irane replies that she doesn't, leaving him heartbroken. Irane does, however, remember him and after turning the corner she begins to cry.

Nassar-Ali finally dies on his eighth day in bed. Irane attends the funeral in secret.

== Cast ==
- Isabella Rossellini as Nasser Ali Khan's mother
- Maria de Medeiros as Faranguisse
- Golshifteh Farahani as Irâne
- Mathieu Amalric as Nasser-Ali
- Jamel Debbouze as Houchang
- Chiara Mastroianni as Lili (as adult)
- Edouard Baer as Azraël
- Eric Caravaca as Abdi
- Didier Flamand as The Music Master
- Tim Williams as the American doctor

== Production ==
The film was produced in Germany in 2010 at the Babelsberg Studios in Potsdam. The backlot provided the setting for all the interior and exterior scenes in the film.

The film is a French-German coproduction between Celluloid Dreams (Hengameh Panahi) and TheManipulators (Joint Venture of Studio Babelsberg (Potsdam), Celluloid Dreams (Paris) and Clou Partners (Munich)). Partners are uFILM, Studio 37, ZDF, Arte, with the participation of Canal+ and Cinécinéma. The film was sponsored by Deutscher Filmförderfonds (DFFF, The German Federal Film Fund), medienboard Berlin-Brandenburg, Cinémage 5, uFund, Cinéart and Prokino.

== Reception ==
On the review aggregator website Rotten Tomatoes, 74% of 70 critics' reviews are positive. The website's consensus reads: "Whimsical and melancholy, Chicken with Plums is visually striking and dreamily compelling despite its occasional narrative missteps." Metacritic, which uses a weighted average, assigned the film a score of 69 out of 100, based on 24 critics, indicating "generally favorable" reviews.

Jay Weissberg wrote in Variety that "The same winning balance of seriousness and humor that made Persepolis such a hit works equally well in Chicken With Plums", and elaborated: "What Satrapi and Paronnaud have really achieved is an evocation of a lost world, much as they did in Persepolis. They've beautifully re-created the fiercely proud, Western-leaning life of the Persian middle class of the 1950s, all constructed in Berlin's Babelsberg studios with the kind of atmospheric quality of Fellini's Cinecitta-constructed Romagna[.] ... Though comparisons may be made with the exaggerated stylings of Amélie, the people in Chicken With Plums eventually lose that sense of artificiality, or rather it becomes superseded by real emotion."

The Washington Times said it had "too much erotic content to make it past Iranian censors," but did justice to the "subversive poetry of the Iranian cinema." The New York Times said it was "captivating, but not exactly moving" and "more anecdotal than epic". The Los Angeles Times said the tone and style lacked coherence, moving from "fairy tale to sitcom grotesquerie, silent comedy to Expressionist chiaroscuro."
