= Radioactive (Redniss book) =

2010 graphic novel by Lauren Redniss

Radioactive: Marie & Pierre Curie: A Tale of Love and Fallout
- Author: Lauren Redniss
- Language: English
- Publication date: 2010

Radioactive: Marie & Pierre Curie: A Tale of Love and Fallout is a 2010 graphic novel, with text and illustrations by Lauren Redniss. It is about Marie Curie and Pierre Curie. Redniss spent three years doing research for the book and going to different locations, including the Institut Curie and the Nevada Test Site.

In addition to the narrative, the book has multiple drawings and assemblies of photographs. The book cover is glow in the dark, and John McMurtrie of the San Francisco Chronicle described some of the imagery as "seemingly glowing". Cyanotope printing was used to generate these images. The typeface used, Eusapia, was made by Redniss, who used pages of books located in the New York Public Library as a basis. Redniss stated that she developed the font to show "certain imperfection and tenderness of a handmade object" while still showing "the tone of a certain seriousness and stateliness".

Dwight Garner, in The New York Times, described the book as "a keeper", describing it as "serious science and brisk storytelling." McMurtrie stated that the imagery with "glowing" elements are the "most powerful" element. It was a finalist for the nonfiction category for the National Book Awards in 2011. It is the basis of the film Radioactive, directed by Marjane Satrapi.

== See also ==
- Oak Flat: A Fight for Sacred Land in the American West, another book by Redniss
- Thunder & Lightning: Weather Past, Present, Future, another book by Redniss
