= Radioactive (film) =

2019 film by Marjane Satrapi

- Theatrical release poster with the original release date
- Directed by: Marjane Satrapi
- Screenplay by: Jack Thorne; Steven Knight
- Based on: Radioactive: Marie & Pierre Curie: A Tale of Love and Fallout by Lauren Redniss
- Produced by: Tim Bevan; Eric Fellner; Paul Webster
- Starring: Rosamund Pike; Sam Riley; Aneurin Barnard; Anya Taylor-Joy
- Cinematography: Haris Zambarloukos
- Edited by: Joe Murphy; Valerio Bonelli
- Music by: Dario Marianelli
- Production companies: Working Title Films; StudioCanal
- Distributed by: Lionsgate
- Release dates: 14 September 2019 (TIFF); 15 June 2020 (United Kingdom)
- Running time: 109 minutes
- Country: United Kingdom
- Language: English
- Box office: $3.5 million

Radioactive is a 2019 British biographical drama film starring Rosamund Pike as Marie Curie. It was directed by Marjane Satrapi and written by Jack Thorne, who adapted the 2010 graphic novel Radioactive: Marie & Pierre Curie: A Tale of Love and Fallout by the American artist Lauren Redniss.

The film premiered as the Closing Night Gala at the 2019 Toronto International Film Festival. The film was scheduled to be released in cinemas in 2020, but its opening was cancelled due to the COVID-19 pandemic. It was released digitally in the United Kingdom on 15 June 2020 by StudioCanal and began streaming on Amazon Prime Video in the United States on 24 July 2020.

== Plot ==
In 1934, Marie Curie collapses in her laboratory in Paris. As she is rushed to the hospital, she remembers her life. In 1893 she was frequently rejected for funding due to her attitude, which she had in common with Pierre Curie. This joint attitude issue with the leading academic authorities led her to share a laboratory with Pierre Curie.

Before Marie discovers polonium and radium, the two fall in love, marry, and have two children. Soon, Marie announces the discovery of radioactivity, revolutionizing physics and chemistry. Radium is soon used in a series of commercial products. Pierre takes Marie to a séance where it is used to attempt to contact the dead, but Marie disapproves of spiritualism and the idea of an afterlife after the death of her mother in Poland.

Although Pierre rejects the Légion d'honneur for not nominating Marie and insists that they jointly share their Nobel Prize in Physics, she becomes agitated that he accepted the Prize in Stockholm without her. Soon afterwards Pierre becomes increasingly sick with anemia as a result of his research and is trampled to death by a horse and cart.

Marie initially dismisses concerns that her elements are toxic, but increasing numbers of people die from serious health conditions after exposure to radium. Depressed, she begins an affair with her colleague Paul Langevin. Although she receives Pierre's professorship at the Sorbonne, the French nationalist press reports the details of her affair with Langevin and she is harassed by xenophobic mobs due to her Polish origins.

Marie returns to the house where she attended the seance and tearfully begs her friend, Loie Fuller, who was there to try to use radium to contact Pierre. When she is awarded the Nobel Prize in Chemistry in 1911, she defies the committee's instructions not to travel to Stockholm and at her award ceremony receives a standing ovation from the entire audience.

In 1914, when World War I starts, Marie's daughter Irene convinces her to run an X-ray unit on the Western Front in order to determine whether or not amputation is needed for wounded soldiers. Irene begins dating Frédéric Joliot, and Marie initially disapproves of that relationship because of their joint research into induced radioactivity, later asking Irene not to take part in Frédéric's future work on this because of possible effects on her health. Although Irene does not heed her mother, together they go to the Western Front to run the X-ray machine.

Scenes of Marie's life are interwoven with scenes depicting the future impact of her discoveries, including external beam radiotherapy at a hospital in Cleveland in 1956, the atomic bombings of Hiroshima and Nagasaki, a nuclear bomb test in Nevada in 1961, and the Chernobyl disaster in 1986. As she dies in 1934, she sees visions of these events before awakening in a hospital room. Pierre arrives and they leave the hospital together.

Before the film's credits, the Curies' accomplishments are detailed, including their mobile unit which X-rayed more than a million men during the war "saving countless lives", their research would be used to create radiotherapy, and the Joliot-Curies would discover artificial or induced radioactivity in 1935.

The movie's last image is of a photo showing Marie Curie's attendance at the 1927 Solvay Conference with many other celebrated physicists, including Albert Einstein.

== Cast ==
- Rosamund Pike as Marie Curie
- Sam Riley as Pierre Curie
- Sian Brooke as Bronia Sklodowska
- Simon Russell Beale as Gabriel Lippmann
- Anya Taylor-Joy as Irene Curie
  - Ariella Glaser as young Irene Curie
  - Indica Watson as six-year-old Irene Curie
- Cara Bossom as Ève Curie
- Aneurin Barnard as Paul Langevin
- Edward Davis as Frédéric Joliot-Curie
- Katherine Parkinson as Emma Jeanne Desfosses
- Tim Woodward as Alexandre Millerand
- Jonathan Aris as Hetreed
- Mirjam Novak as Nurse Francoise
- Corey Johnson as Adam Warner
- Demetri Goritsas as Dr. Jenkins
- Michael Gould as Judge Clark
- Drew Jacoby as Loie Fuller
- Paul Albertson as Paul Tibbets

== Production ==
It was announced in February 2017 that Marjane Satrapi would direct a biopic on the life of Marie Curie, with StudioCanal and Working Title Films serving as producers. An "autumn 2017" production start was initially foreseen. In May 2017, during the Cannes Film Festival, Rosamund Pike was cast as Curie.

In February 2018, Amazon Studios acquired the US distribution rights to the film, with filming beginning in the Hungarian cities of Budapest and Esztergom the same week. The cast was rounded out by Sam Riley, Anya Taylor-Joy, Aneurin Barnard and Simon Russell Beale a few days later.

== Release ==
Radioactive premiered as the Closing Night Gala at the Toronto International Film Festival on 14 September 2019. To celebrate International Women's Day, the film's UK premiere took place at the Curzon Mayfair Cinema on 8 March 2020, ahead of its intended 20 March theatrical release, which was cancelled due to the COVID-19 pandemic. StudioCanal eventually released the film in the United Kingdom through electronic sell-through platforms on 15 June 2020 and through video on demand on 6 July, followed by a DVD release on 27 July. In the United States, where the film was originally set to be released theatrically on 24 April 2020 by Amazon Studios, it was released straight to Amazon Prime Video on 24 July 2020.

== Reception ==
=== Critical response ===
On the review aggregator website Rotten Tomatoes, the film holds an approval rating of 63%, based on 160 reviews, with an average rating of 6/10. The website's critics consensus reads, "Radioactive's flawed script and counterproductive storytelling choices are offset by Rosamund Pike's central performance in a sincere tribute to a brilliant scientific mind." Metacritic, which uses a weighted average, assigned the film a score of 56 out of 100, based on 31 critics, indicating "mixed or average" reviews.

Deborah Young of The Hollywood Reporter praised Pike's performance, the pacing and the treatment of the subject. The Independent gave it two stars and criticised the "on-the-nose writing that sucks the air out of every scene, as characters ceremoniously announce the film's themes and their personal motivations." Charles Bramesco of The Guardian panned the film as "by-the-numbers", criticising the script and direction, and gave it one star out of five. Kate Taylor of The Globe and Mail concluded that "the viewer may decide [Marie would] rather read a comic book."

Although the film is based on a 2010 graphic novel, it is marketed as a "biopic" on Marie Curie. Geraldine McGinty of Cornell University criticised the film not just for altering many historical events for dramatic effect, but for misrepresenting Curie's character and that of her husband, e.g. by saying that she stayed at home rather than attending the 1905 Nobel ceremony with Pierre, where he belatedly delivered the lecture for their 1903 prize. McGinty said that its misleading analogies, misrepresentation of principal characters, and inappropriate nudity and violence, all make it unsuitable as an educational or biographical source.
