= Lauren Redniss =

American writer

- Born: 1974 (age 51–52)
- Education: Brown University
- Writing career
- Language: English and French
- Notable works: Thunder & Lightning: Weather Past, Present, Future; Radioactive: Marie and Pierre Curie, A Tale of Love and Fallout
- Notable awards: PEN/E. O. Wilson Literary Science Writing Award (2016), MacArthur Fellow (2016)

Lauren Redniss (b. 1974) is an American artist and writer. She was awarded a "Genius Grant" from the John D. and Catherine T. MacArthur Foundation in 2016.

== Education ==
Redniss graduated from Brown University. She earned an MFA in Illustration as Visual Essay in 2000 from the School of Visual Arts.

== Career ==
Redniss is the author of several works of visual non-fiction. Radioactive: Marie and Pierre Curie, A Tale of Love and Fallout (2010) was a finalist for the 2011 National Book Award, the first work of visual non-fiction to be so recognized. Thunder & Lightning: Weather Past, Present, Future (2015) won the 2016 PEN/E. O. Wilson Literary Science Writing Award. The New York Times called Oak Flat: A Fight for Sacred Land in the American West (2020) "astonishing" and "virtuosic."

In 2021, the New Yorker magazine wrote, "In the world of arts and letters, there isn’t anyone quite like Lauren Redniss.... Reading her work is like poring over the notebooks of a hyper-literate, hyper-curious, and slightly mad artist." The Sunday Telegraph has called Redniss' work "some of the most inventive, rigorous and beguiling published anywhere in the world." In its citation of Radioactive, the National Book Foundation wrote: "Redniss' achievement is a celebration of the essential power of books to inform, charm, and transport. In marrying the graphic and visual arts with biography and cultural history, she has expanded the realm of non-fiction."

Redniss is also the author of Century Girl: 100 Years in the Life of Doris Eaton Travis, Last Living Star of Ziegfeld Follies (2006). Her writing and drawing have appeared in numerous publications including the New York Times, which nominated her work for the Pulitzer Prize.

Redniss has been a New America Foundation fellow, a Guggenheim Foundation fellow, a fellow at the New York Public Library’s Cullman Center for Scholars & Writers, and Artist-in-Residence at the American Museum of Natural History. She teaches at the Parsons School of Design in New York City.

== In other media ==
In 2019, a film adaptation of Radioactive, premiered at the Toronto International Film Festival. The film, directed by Marjane Satrapi, starred Rosamund Pike as Marie Curie, Sam Riley as Pierre Curie, and Anya Taylor-Joy as Irène Curie.

In 2020, Redniss created a large installation at Lincoln Center for New York City Ballet. Her installation featured portraits and oral histories of over 100 people who work behind the scenes at the theater.
