= Maria de Medeiros =

Portuguese actress, film director and singer (born 1965)

Maria de Medeiros DamSE
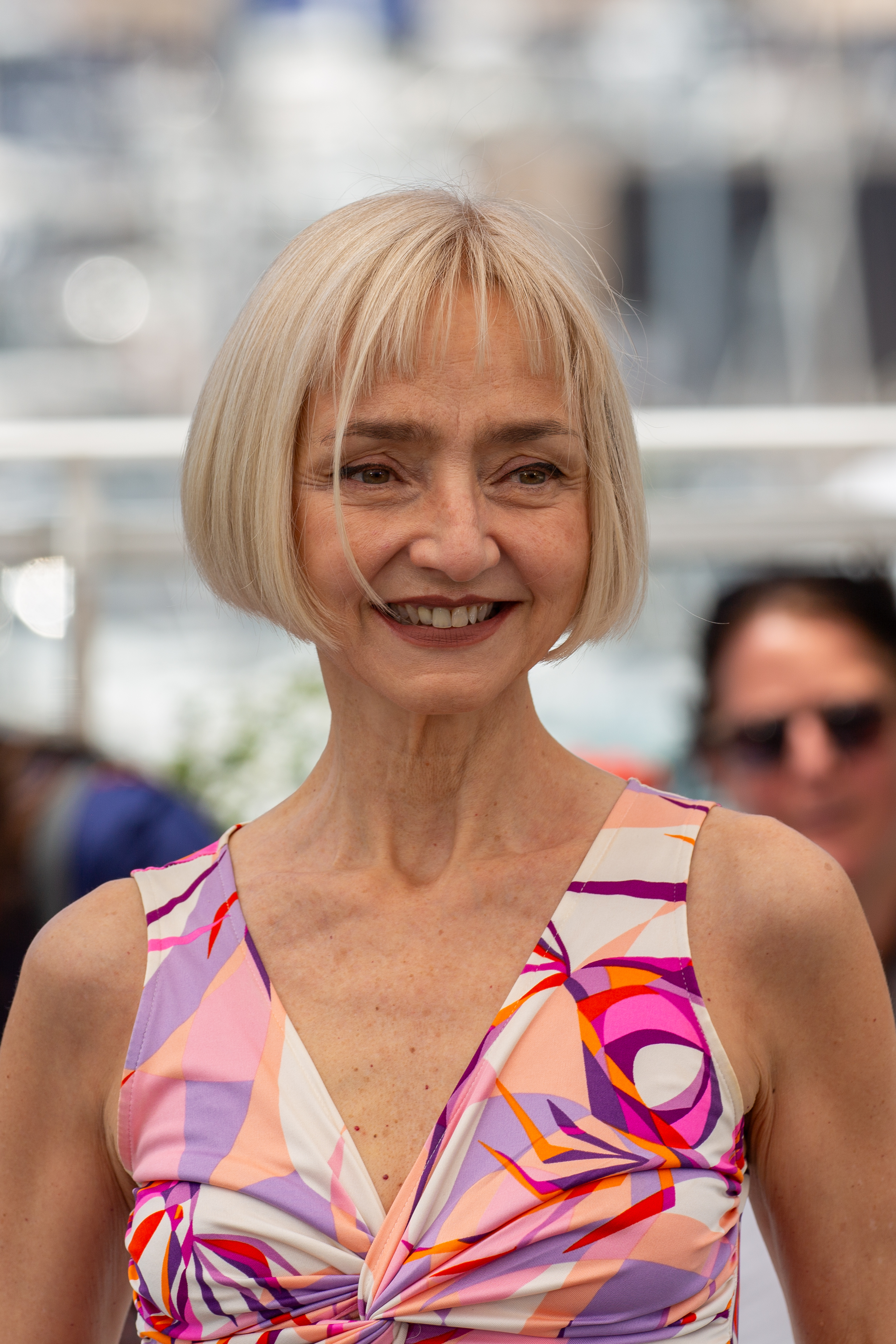
- Medeiros in 2025
- Born: Maria Esteves de Medeiros Victorino de Almeida; 19 August 1965 (age 61); Lisbon, Portugal
- Occupations: Actress, director, singer
- Years active: 1981–present
- Spouse: Agustí Camps
- Children: 2
- Father: António Victorino de Almeida
- Relatives: Inês de Medeiros (sister)

Maria Esteves de Medeiros Victorino de Almeida (born 19 August 1965), known professionally as Maria de Medeiros (Portuguese pronunciation: [mɐˈɾiɐ ðɨ mɨˈðɐjɾuʃ]), is a Portuguese actress, director, and singer who has been involved in both European and American film-productions.

== Early life ==
Maria de Medeiros was born in Lisbon, Portugal, the daughter of musician and composer António Victorino de Almeida. She played her first part on screen at the age of 15. At 18, she moved to France to pursue her acting studies and was a student at the Conservatoire national supérieur d'art dramatique (CNSAD), graduating in 1988.

Medeiros is the first Portuguese woman to be designated a UNESCO Artist for Peace.

== Career ==
=== Film ===
Medeiros's resemblance to Anaïs Nin landed her the primary role in Henry & June (1990), in which she played the author. In 1990, she played the role of Maria in Ken McMullen's film about the rise of the Paris Commune, 1871. In 1994, Medeiros appeared in Quentin Tarantino's Pulp Fiction playing Fabienne, the girlfriend of Butch Coolidge, played by Bruce Willis.

In 2000, she directed and starred in the film April Captains about the 1974 Carnation Revolution in Portugal. The film was screened in the Un Certain Regard section at the 2000 Cannes Film Festival.

In 2003, Medeiros appeared as a hairdresser in the movie My Life Without Me starring Sarah Polley. She has starred in the Canadian movie The Saddest Music in the World (2004) directed by Guy Maddin and co-starring Isabella Rossellini and Mark McKinney.

=== Music ===
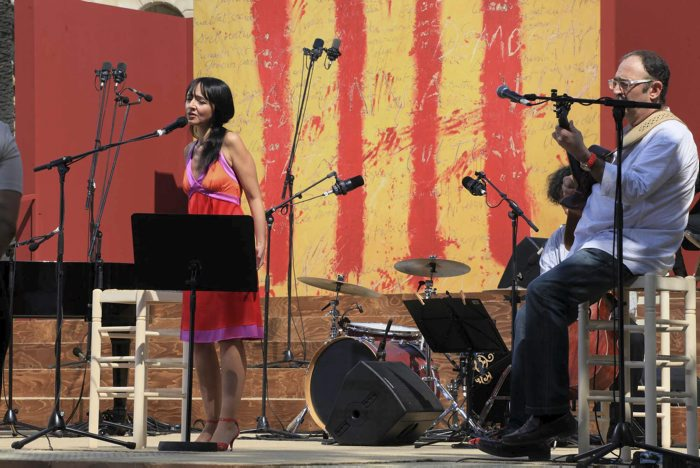
Maria de Medeiros singing in the celebration of National Day of Catalonia 2012

In 2007, Medeiros released the album A little more Blue on which she performs songs by Brazilian musicians, including Chico Buarque, Caetano Veloso, Ivan Lins, and Dolores Duran. She sings in Portuguese, French ("Joana Francesa" by Buarque), and English ("A little more Blue" by Veloso).

In 2009, she sang "These Boots are made for Walkin'" on The Legendary Tigerman's album Femina. Her second recording, Penínsulas & Continentes, was released on 23 February 2010. Her third album was Pájaros Eternos in 2012. For her fourth album, she teamed up with Phoebe Killdeer & The Shift to produce The Piano's playing the Devils Tune, released in 2016.

== Selected filmography ==
=== As director ===
- Sévérine C. (1987)
- Fragmento II (1988)
- A Morte do Príncipe (1991)
- April Captains (2000)
- Mathilde au matin (2004)
- Je t'aime moi non plus (2004)
- Repare Bem (2012)

=== As actress ===
- Silvestre (1981)
- Sorceress (Le Moine et la sorcière) (1987)
- 1871 (1990)
- Henry & June (1990)
- Meeting Venus (1991)
- Huevos de Oro (a.k.a. Golden Balls) (1993)
- Pulp Fiction (1994)
- Adão e Eva (1995)
- Polygraph (1996)
- Go for Gold (1997)
- Airbag (1997)
- Spanish Fly (1998)
- Babel (1999)
- April Captains (2000)
- Deuxième vie (2000)
- Honolulu Baby (2001)
- A Samba for Sherlock (2001)
- Water and Salt (2001)
- Stranded: Náufragos (2002)
- My Life Without Me (2003)
- I, Cesar (Moi César, 10 ans 1/2, 1m39) (2003)
- The Saddest Music in the World (2004)
- The Remains of Nothing (2004)
- Je m'appelle Élisabeth (2006)
- Medea Miracle (2007)
- Midsummer Madness (2007)
- Fallen Heroes (2007)
- Riparo (a.k.a. Shelter Me) (2007)
- My Stars (2008)
- David's Birthday (2009)
- O Contador de Histórias (a.k.a. The Story of Me) (2009)
- Chicken with Plums (2011)
- Holidays by the Sea (2011)
- Journey to Portugal (2011)
- Dream and Silence (2012)
- Gang of the Jotas (2012) as Maria
- Women Directors, talking on a blade (2014)
- Pasolini (2014)
- The Forbidden Room (2015)
- Le Fils de Joseph (2016)
- The Killer (2017)
- The Broken Key (2017)
- Verdades Secretas (2021)
- Giorni Felici (2024)
- Reflection in a Dead Diamond (2025)
- Una quinta portuguesa (2025)

== Discography ==
- A Little More Blue (2007)
- Penínsulas & Continentes (2010)
- Pássaros Eternos (2013)
- The Piano's Playing the Devil's Tune (2016) - with Phoebe Killdeer & the Shift

=== Collaborations ===
- Drama Box, by Mísia (2005)
- Rendez-vous chez Nino Rota, CD+DVD from the Italian Mauro Gioia (2008), with Adriana Calcanhotto, Martirio, Ute Lemper, Catherine Ringer, Susana Rinaldi and Sharleen Spiteri. De Medeiros sings "La pappa col pomodoro"
- Femina, by The Legendary Tigerman (2009). De Medeiros sings "These Boots Are Made for Walkin'"
- Señora (ellas cantan a Serrat) (2009). De Medeiros sings "Nanas de la Cebolla"
