= Stewart Richards =

English film producer (born 1956)

Stewart Richards (born 1956) is an English film producer, television executive, publisher and writer.

He is notable for producing award-winning British arthouse films in the 1980s and 1990s, including the 1991 Oscar-nominated and BAFTA-nominated Dear Rosie, the 1988 Palme d'Or-nominated Out of Town, and the 1990 Un Certain Regard-selected 1871.

== Early life and education ==
Stewart was born in Ripley, Derbyshire, in 1956. Aged 17, he joined the National Youth Theatre and won an Arts Council trainee director fellowship, working at the Nottingham Playhouse, the Theatre Royal Lincoln and Birmingham Repertory Theatre. He later studied for three years at the London Academy of Music and Dramatic Art.

== Film career ==
In the 1980s, Stewart produced a number of British art films, including:

- Out of Town, a short film by Norman Hull and starring David Morrissey, which was in competition for the Palme d'Or at the 1988 Cannes Film Festival and was screened at the 1988 São Paulo International Film Festival;
- 1871, a feature film by Ken McMullen and starring Roshan Seth and Timothy Spall that was selected for Un Certain Regard at the 1990 Cannes Film Festival and which was screened at the 1991 American Film Institute Los Angeles International Film Festival; and
- Dear Rosie, a short film by Peter Cattaneo, co-written by Peter Morgan, that was nominated for the 1991 Academy Award for Best Live Action Short Film and the BAFTA Award for Best Short Film, and which won a gold plaque for best short film at the Chicago International Film Festival.

== Television career ==
In the 1990s, Stewart joined Channel 4 Films and Film on Four and then joined the team that launched Carlton Television in 1993, where he line-produced Frontiers, co-written by Stephen Poliakoff.

== Publishing and writing ==
Stewart founded the publishing house Mr Punch, which produces radio drama and audiobooks, including the 1995 three-part play The Mutiny on the Bounty, with Oliver Reed, Linus Roache and Roger Daltrey, for BBC Radio 4.

He has written two books: The Great Train Robbery: The definitive account, about the 1963 Great Train Robbery, which he co-produced as a documentary for ITV Studios; and Curtain Down at Her Majesty’s, about Queen Victoria's final days, which he produced as a five-part drama for BBC Radio 4 and which was selected for Pick of the Week.
