= António Victorino de Almeida =

Portuguese composer

António Victorino de Almeida GCIH
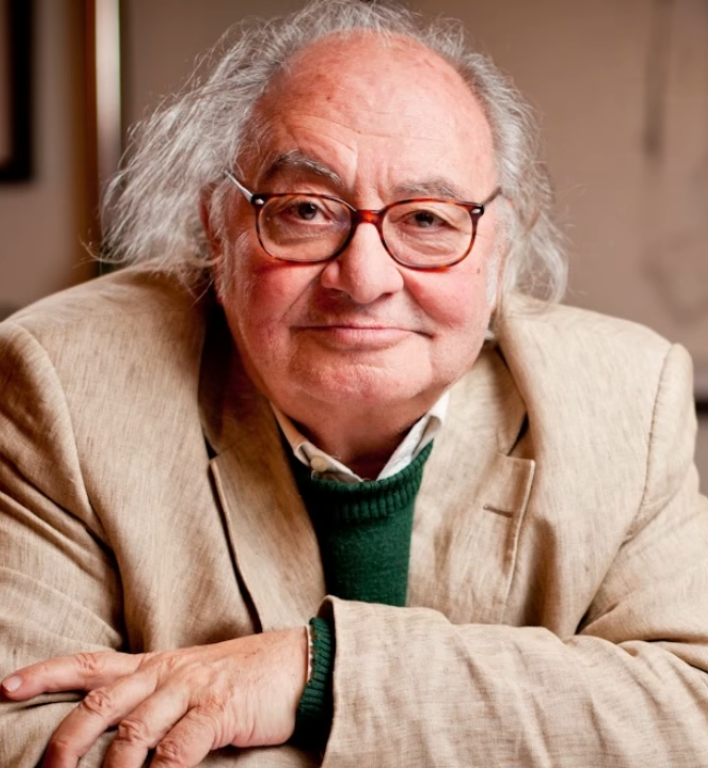
- Born: António Victorino Goulart de Medeiros e Almeida; 21 May 1940 (age 86); Lisbon, Portugal
- Occupation: Composer
- Children: Maria de Medeiros; Inês de Medeiros; Anne Victorino de Almeida

António Victorino Goulart de Medeiros e Almeida (born 21 May 1940) is a Portuguese composer, music teacher, pianist and writer from Lisbon. He has also directed several films and television programmes about music. He is the father of actresses Maria de Medeiros and Inês de Medeiros and the violinist and composer Anne Victorino de Almeida.

== Distinctions ==
=== National orders ===
- Grand Cross of the Order of Prince Henry the Navigator (9 June 2005)

== See also ==
- List of Portuguese composers
