= 1871 (film) =

- Directed by: Ken McMullen
- Written by: Ken McMullen; James Leahy; Terry James
- Produced by: Stewart Richards
- Starring: Ana Padrao; Roshan Seth; John Lynch; Jack Klaff; Timothy Spall
- Cinematography: Elso Roque
- Edited by: William Diver
- Music by: Barrie Guard
- Production companies: Looseyard; La Sept; Palawood Development Inc. Animatógrafo - Produção de Filmes Lda
- Distributed by: FilmFour International
- Release date: 10 September 1990
- Running time: 100 minutes
- Countries: United Kingdom; France
- Languages: English; French

1871 is a 1990 period film about the rise and fall of the Paris Commune in 1871. It was directed by Ken McMullen and produced by Stewart Richards. The writers were McMullen, James Leahy and Terry James. It was screened in the Un Certain Regard section at the 1990 Cannes Film Festival and the 1991 American Film Institute Los Angeles International Film Festival, at which it was “highly recommended” by the Los Angeles Times. The film stars Ana Padrao, Roshan Seth, John Lynch, Jack Klaff, and Timothy Spall.

== Cast ==
- Ana Padrao - Severine
- Roshan Seth - Grafton
- John Lynch - O'Brien
- Jack Klaff - Cluseret
- Timothy Spall - Ramborde
- Dominique Pinon - Napoleon III
- Maria de Medeiros - Maria
- Med Hondo - Karl Marx
- Cédric Michiels - The Urchin
