= MTV Movie Award for Best New Filmmaker =

This is a following list for the MTV Movie Award winners for Best New Filmmaker. This award was last given out in 2002.

== Winners ==
Year	Director	Movie
1992	John Singleton	Boyz n the Hood
1993	Carl Franklin	One False Move
1994	Steven Zaillian	Searching for Bobby Fischer
1995	Steve James	Hoop Dreams
1996	Wes Anderson	Bottle Rocket
1997	Doug Liman	Swingers
1998	Peter Cattaneo	The Full Monty
1999	Guy Ritchie	Lock, Stock and Two Smoking Barrels
2000	Spike Jonze	Being John Malkovich
2001	Sofia Coppola	The Virgin Suicides
2002	Christopher Nolan	Memento
