= Adão e Eva =

- Film poster
- Directed by: Joaquim Leitão
- Starring: Maria de Medeiros; Joaquim de Almeida
- Release date: December 22, 1995
- Running time: 104 minutes
- Country: Portugal
- Language: Portuguese

Adão e Eva is a 1995 Portuguese film directed by Joaquim Leitão.

== Cast ==
- Maria de Medeiros
- Joaquim de Almeida
- Ana Bustorff
- Karra Elejalde
- Cristina Carvalhal

== Reception ==
It won the 1996 Portuguese Golden Globe for Best Film, as well as Best Director, Best Actor (Joaquim de Almeida) and the Best Actress (Maria de Medeiros).
