= Inês de Medeiros =

Portuguese actress and politician (born 1968)

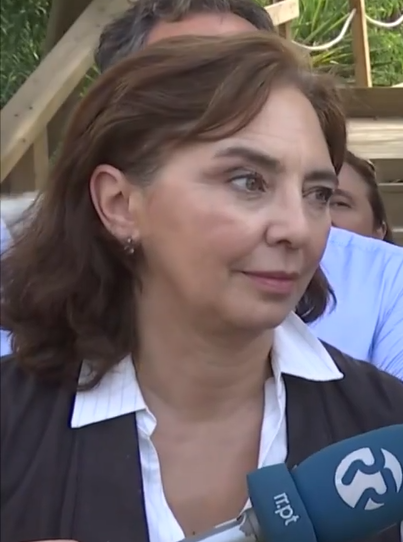
- Medeiros in 2024

Mayor of Almada
- Incumbent
- Assumed office 28 October 2017
- Preceded by: Joaquim Judas

Member of the Assembly of the Republic
- In office 15 October 2009 – 24 January 2016
- Constituency: Lisbon (2009–2015); Setúbal (2015–2016)

Personal details
- Born: Inês de Saint-Maurice Esteves de Medeiros Victorino de Almeida; 15 April 1968 (age 58) Vienna, Austria
- Party: Socialist Party
- Parent: António Victorino de Almeida (father)
- Relatives: Maria de Medeiros (sister)
- Education: Sorbonne University

Inês de Saint-Maurice Esteves de Medeiros Victorino de Almeida (born 15 April 1968) is a Portuguese actress and politician. She won a Portuguese Golden Globe in 1996. A member of the Socialist Party, she was a deputy in the Assembly of the Republic from 2009 to 2016, and has served as mayor of Almada from 2017.

== Early life and acting ==
Medeiros was born in Vienna, Austria, where her father António Victorino de Almeida was a conductor, while her mother Maria Armanda Esteves was a journalist. Her sister Maria is also an actress. The family moved regularly until the Carnation Revolution in Portugal in 1974; they settled in Lisbon the year after. She studied two years of Portuguese literature at the NOVA University Lisbon but did not graduate; she then studied theatre for two years at Sorbonne University.

Medeiros made her cinematic debut in 1981's A Culpa, directed by her father. In 1997, she won a Golden Globe for Best Actress in a Motion Picture, for her performance in Pandora.

== Politics ==
In the October 2009 elections, Medeiros was elected to the Assembly of the Republic for the Lisbon, representing the Socialist Party (PS). She commuted to the legislature from her home in Paris, with the tickets being reimbursed by the state as if they were flights between Lisbon and the Azores, €620 return. This was in agreement with pre-existing legislation around deputies from that archipelago. PS parliamentary leader Francisco Assis said of the matter "On a scale of zero to 100 of the main problems in this country [with zero as the highest], this subject must come 300th". She was re-elected in 2011 and 2015, the latter time by Setúbal.

In the 2017 municipal elections, Medeiros became mayor of Almada after forming a coalition with the Social Democratic Party; the result ended the hegemony of the Communist Party that had existed in the city since the first democratic elections in 1976. She won a second term in 2021, ahead of the former three-term Communist mayor of nearby Setúbal, Maria das Dores Meira.

In late 2022, the Almada local government led by Medeiros began the demolition of the Bairro do Segundo Torrão, a shanty town in Trafaria inhabited mainly by immigrants. The reason given was that drainage problems could have caused the buildings to collapse. The decision was condemned by Amnesty International. Medeiros said that residents had been put in emergency accommodation in Almada or Lisbon hotels until housing contracts could be finalised. The deadline for leaving before demolition was 30 September; houses collapsed into the drainage ditch due to heavy rains on 20 October.

In the 2025 Portuguese local elections, Medeiros won a third and final term as mayor, though the PS fell from five to four seats and from 39% to 29% of the vote. She said that she would negotiate with any other party except the two councillors from Chega, describing their party as one that has "nothing positive, has no programme, and only wants to defeat democracy".
