= Holding the Baby (American TV series) =

American television series

- Genre: Sitcom
- Based on: Holding the Baby by: Dominic Minghella; Mark Wadlow
- Developed by: Howard J. Morris
- Starring: Jon Patrick Walker; Jennifer Westfeldt; Eddie McClintock
- Composers: Paul Buckley; Jonathan Wolff
- Country of origin: United States
- Original language: English
- No. of seasons: 1
- No. of episodes: 14 (7 unaired)

Production
- Camera setup: Multi-camera
- Running time: 30 minutes
- Production companies: Howard J. Morris Productions; Granada Entertainment; 20th Century Fox Television

Original release
- Network: Fox
- Release: August 23 – December 15, 1998

Holding the Baby is an American sitcom television series that aired on Fox from August 23 until December 15, 1998. The series is an American version of the British show of the same name.

== Premise ==
An ad exec hires a female grad student as a nanny for his newborn son when his wife moves to Tibet with another man.

== Cast ==
=== Main ===
- Jon Patrick Walker as Gordon Stiles
- Jennifer Westfeldt as Kelly O'Malley
- Eddie McClintock as Jimmy Stiles
- Ron Leibman as Stan Peterson
- Sherri Shepherd as Miss Boggs
- Carter Kemp / Jordan Kemp as Dan

== Episodes ==
No.	Title	Directed by	Written by	Original release date	Prod. code
1	"Pilot"	James Widdoes	Howard J. Morris	August 23, 1998	1ACH79
Gordon begs Kelly to babysit Danny.
2	"Father Knows Breast"	Jeff Melman	Jack Kenny and Brian Hargrove	August 30, 1998	1ACH01
Gordon fears he has an underdeveloped maternal instinct when joins a class for new moms.
3	"Guess Who's Not Coming to Dinner"	Richard Correll	Ellen Idelson and Rob Lotterstein	September 6, 1998	1ACH02
The parents of Gordon's wife comes for a visit. They have no idea that their daughter is in Tibet with another man.
4	"Homeward Boundaries"	Richard Correll	Ari Posner and Eric Preven	September 20, 1998	1ACH03
Gordon gives Kelly the night off.
5	"Looking For Mr. Hoppity"	Jeff Melman	Jack Kenny and Brian Hargrove	December 1, 1998	1ACH05
Stan's new wife uses Dan's stuffed bunny in a menagerie of stuffed animals.
6	"The Gay Divorcee"	Jeff Melman	Howard J. Morris and Rosalind Moore	December 8, 1998	1ACH04
Kelly makes Gordon's Date think that he is gay.
7	"One Date at a Time"	Richard Correll	Eric Idelson and Rob Lotterstein	December 15, 1998	1ACH07
Gordon and Kelly end up ruining each other's dates.
8	"Viva Las Gordy"	Michael Zinberg	Ellen Idelson and Rob Lotterstein	Unaired	1ACH12
Gordon plans a charity event.
9	"My Brother, My Wife"	TBD	TBD	Unaired	1ACH06
Jimmy offers to babysit Dan while Gordon is at work. Heather Locklear has a cameo.
10	"No Man Is A Fantasy Island"	TBD	TBD	Unaired	1ACH08
Jimmy gets the leading role in a movie. Gordon's fantasy about Kelly ends up on her answering machine.
11	"Make Room For Da Da"	TBD	TBD	Unaired	1ACH09
12	"Barefoot In The Nanny Park"	TBD	TBD	Unaired	1ACH10
13	"Gordy's Choice"	TBD	TBD	Unaired	1ACH11
14	"Bordy Gordy"	TBD	TBD	Unaired	1ACH13
