= Journey to Portugal (film) =

2011 film by Sérgio Tréfaut

- Viagem a Portugal
- Directed by: Sergio Tréfaut
- Written by: Sergio Tréfaut
- Produced by: Sergio Tréfaut
- Starring: Maria de Medeiros, Isabel Ruth, Makena Diop
- Cinematography: Edgar Moura
- Edited by: Sergio Trefaut, Goncalo Soares, Pedro Marques, Maria Gaivao
- Music by: György Ligeti
- Release date: 16 June 2011
- Running time: 75 minutes
- Country: Portugal
- Language: Portuguese

Journey to Portugal (Portuguese: Viagem a Portugal) is a 2011 Portuguese film directed and written by Sergio Tréfaut, based on a true story. It was Tréfaut's first feature-length fiction film and stars Maria de Medeiros, Isabel Ruth, and Makena Diop.

== Synopsis ==
Maria, a Ukrainian doctor, comes to Portugal to spend a year with Greco, her husband who is also a doctor. Upon arrival at Faro airport she is the only person from Kyiv approached by agents of Immigration and Customs that lead her to a room of interrogation, without any explanations. All this occurs because the authorities suspect that something illegal should be behind her trip, since she is from Eastern Europe and her husband is Senegalese.

== Awards and nominations ==
Caminhos do Cinema Português 2011 (Portugal)

Category	Result
Best film	Won
Best supporting actress — Isabel Ruth	Won

Golden Globes 2012 (Portugal)

Category	Result
Best film	Nominated
Best actress — Maria de Medeiros	Nominated
