= Chicken with Plums =

2004 graphic novel by Marjane Satrapi

Chicken with Plums (Poulet aux prunes)
- French edition cover
- Date: 2004
- Page count: 96 pages
- Publisher: L'Association

Creative team
- Creator: Marjane Satrapi

Original publication
- Published in: France
- Date of publication: October 2004
- Language: French
- ISBN: 2-84414-159-5

Translation
- Publisher: Pantheon Books
- Date: 2006
- ISBN: 0375424156
- Translator: Anjali Singh

Chicken with Plums (French: Poulet aux prunes) is a 2004 graphic novel by Iranian author Marjane Satrapi.

== Synopsis ==
Nasser Ali Khan, a relative of Satrapi's and a tar player, has his cherished instrument broken after a heated argument with his wife. The book narrates the last eight days of his life as he lost the will to live, in November 1958 in Tehran.

== Publication history ==
The original French-language version was published in France in 2004 and the English version was translated by Anjali Singh and published by Pantheon Books in 2006 (ISBN 0375424156), followed by a softcover version in 2009 (ISBN 0375714758).

== Awards ==
Chicken with Plums won the Best Album Award (Prix du Meilleur Album) at the Angoulême International Comics Festival in 2005.

== Film adaptation ==
Satrapi directed a film adaptation of the comic, which debuted at the La Pate theatre in France on October 26, 2011.
