= Jack Klaff =

South African actor, academic, writer

Jack Klaff is a South African-born actor, writer and academic. He attended the Bristol Old Vic Theatre School. He has held professorships at Princeton University and Starlab.

Klaff initially studied law at Witwatersrand University before moving into acting. He left South Africa for political reasons and trained formally as an actor in the United Kingdom. Among his early screen roles were those in Star Wars Episode IV: A New Hope (1977) as Red Four and For Your Eyes Only (1981) as Apostis. He also appeared in the 1984-87 BBC radio comedy series Delve Special alongside Stephen Fry.

== Filmography ==
Year	Title	Role	Notes
1976	Space: 1999	Launch Pad Security Guard	3 episodes
1977	Star Wars Episode IV: A New Hope	John D. Branon (Red Four)	
1981	For Your Eyes Only	Apostis	
1982	The Hunchback of Notre Dame	Officer	TV movie
1985	King David	Jonathan	
1987	Vanity Fair	Rawdon Crawley	TV miniseries
1990	1871	Cluseret	
1991	The Case-Book of Sherlock Holmes	The Hon. Philip Green	The Disappearance of Lady Frances Carfax
1991	Chernobyl: The Final Warning	Dr Pieter Claasen	TV movie
1991	Red Dwarf	Abraham Lincoln	1 episode
1995	Ghosts	Trevor	1 episode
1998	Cadfael	Lord Eudo Blount	The Potter's Field
2004	Hotet	McBready	
2009	Elemental Storage	Professor Phillip Hargrave	

Jack Klaff appeared in Midsomer Murders, season 8, episode 2, as Freddie Bonavita.

Klaff wrote and performed a one-man show "Nagging Doubt" at the Edinburgh Festival in 1981. It was revived in May 2010 at the Finborough Theatre. The play revisits the 1960 Sharpeville Massacre. In June 2025, at 59E59 Theaters in Manhattan, he appeared in the one-man play, Kafka, which he wrote. "Kafka premiered in 1983 at the Cheltenham Literary Festival to commemorate the centenary of Kafka's birth". It was revived as part of a Jack Klaff Retrospective at the Riverside Studios in London in 1994 and was revived again in 2024, at the Finborough Theatre in London, "for the centenary of Kafka’s death". He is the author of The Bluffer's Guide to the Quantum Universe.
