= Dear Rosie =

- Directed by: Peter Cattaneo
- Written by: Peter Morgan; Mark Wadlow
- Produced by: Stewart Richards; Barnaby Thompson; Nicky Kentish Barnes
- Starring: Fiona Victory
- Cinematography: Clive Tickner
- Edited by: Guy Bensley
- Music by: Simon Davison
- Production companies: Channel 4 Television Corporation; World's End Productions
- Distributed by: FilmFour International
- Release dates: 15 March 1991 (New York New Directors and New Films Festival)
- Running time: 11 minutes
- Country: United Kingdom
- Language: English

Dear Rosie is a 1991 British short subject directed by Peter Cattaneo from a script by Peter Morgan and Mark Wadlow. The plot follows Rosie, played by Fiona Victory, an unsuccessful novelist who begins receiving letters from overweight people after her agent publishes her diet tips.

Cattaneo directed the short while he was a student at the Royal College of Art. The 11-minute film premiered at the 1990 London Film Festival. The following year, it was presented at the New York Film Festival.

The short was nominated in the Best Short Film category at the 44th British Academy Film Awards, and the Best Live Action Short Film category at the 63rd Academy Awards.
