= Hunted (2020 film) =

2020 thriller film

- Film Poster
- Directed by: Vincent Paronnaud
- Written by: Vincent Paronnaud; Léa Pernollet
- Produced by: Alexandre Perrier; Benoit Roland
- Starring: Christian Bronchart; Lucie Debay; Ciaran O'Brien; Jean-Mathias Pondant; Kevin Van Doorslaer
- Cinematography: Joachim Philippe
- Edited by: Nicolas Sarkissian
- Music by: Olivier Bernet
- Distributed by: Shudder
- Release dates: August 21, 2020 (Fantasia Film Festival); January 14, 2021
- Running time: 87 minutes
- Countries: Belgium; France; Ireland
- Language: English

Hunted is a 2020 survival thriller film directed by Vincent Paronnaud. The film stars Christian Bronchart, Lucie Debay, Ciaran O'Brien, Jean-Mathias Pondant and Kevin Van Doorslaer. The film premiered at the 2020 Fantasia Film Festival and released on Shudder on January 14, 2021.

== Plot ==
What started as a flirtatious encounter at a bar turns into a life-or-death struggle as Eve (Lucie Debay) becomes the unknowing target of a misogynistic plot against her. Forced to flee as two men pursue her through the forest, she’s pushed to her extremes while fighting to survive in the wilderness—but survival isn’t enough for Eve. She will have revenge.

== Cast ==
- Christian Bronchart as The Foreman
- Lucie Debay as Eve
- Ciaran O'Brien as The Accomplice
- Jean-Mathias Pondant as Barman
- Kevin Van Doorslaer as Eve's Boss
- Kevin Van Doorslaer as Eve's Boyfriend
- Gilles Vandeweerd as Husband
- Leila Putcuips as The Pregnant Wife
- Dianne Weller as Real Estate Agent
- Arieh Worthalter as The Handsome Man
- Ryan Brodie as Jeremy
- Simone Milsdochter as The Huntress
- Bruce Ellison as Pump Attendant
- Guillaume Kerbusch as The Guard

== Reception ==
On the review aggregator website Rotten Tomatoes, 61% of 46 critics' reviews are positive, with an average rating of 6.2/10. The website's consensus reads: "Although its overly sadistic moments threaten to derail it, Hunted's grindhouse thrills will be enough to please fans." Metacritic, which uses a weighted average, assigned the film a score of 47 out of 100, based on 8 critics, indicating "mixed or average" reviews.
