= Thunder & Lightning: Weather Past, Present, Future =

2015 nonfiction book by Lauren Redniss

Thunder & Lightning: Weather Past, Present, Future is a 2015 illustrated non-fiction book by Lauren Redniss, published by Random House in the United States and Vintage in the United Kingdom.

Lucy Scholes of The Guardian described the book as "natural science writing by means of highly visual storytelling". The book includes biographical data on people in history related to the weather.

Sadie Stein of The New York Times wrote that the book's style, lettering, and artwork show "whimsy". Susanna Nesmith of the Miami Herald described the writing style as "simple, unadorned".

Redniss received inspiration for her photogravure and photopolymer processes from Mark Catesby's painting of a flamingo and P. Henderson's cowslip engraving.

Kirkus Reviews described the book as "highly atmospheric, entertainingly earnest, and intimate". Philip Hoare Times Higher Education stated that the book is "extraordinary".

== See also ==
- Oak Flat: A Fight for Sacred Land in the American West, another book by Redniss
- Radioactive, another book by Redniss
