= Frontiers (1996 TV series) =

- Genre: Crime drama
- Created by: Stephen Poliakoff
- Written by: Sam Donovan; Sandy Welch
- Directed by: Michael Whyte; Andrew Piddington
- Starring: Kevin McNally; Peter Howitt; Simon Kunz; Clare Holman; Hywel Bennett; David Sibley; Philip Glenister; Amelia Bullmore; Fay Ripley
- Composer: Steve Parr
- Country of origin: United Kingdom
- Original language: English
- No. of series: 1
- No. of episodes: 6

Production
- Executive producer: Therese Pickard
- Producer: Stewart Richards
- Editor: Graham Walker
- Camera setup: Gary Parnham
- Running time: 50 minutes
- Production company: Carlton Television

Original release
- Network: ITV
- Release: 7 May – 25 June 1996

Frontiers is an ITV television crime drama series was produced by Carlton Television, broadcast between 7 May and 25 June 1996. The series, created by acclaimed writer Stephen Poliakoff, focuses on the rivalry between two rival police chiefs of the Special Crime Squad and their respective teams of officers. Co-written with Sam Donovan and Sandy Welch, only a single series of six episodes was broadcast, as despite a high-profile cast, including Kevin McNally, Clare Holman, Hywel Bennett and Philip Glenister, the series failed to impact audiences and was quickly axed. Amelia Bullmore, Fay Ripley and singer Sophie Ellis-Bextor also appeared in the series.

Thomas Sutcliffe of The Independent said of the series; "Stephen Poliakoff is noted as a Special Adviser to Frontiers. Stephen Poliakoff, the respected playwright, that is. This is inexplicable, unless they have simply ignored his advice, because Frontiers is the apotheosis of the Angry Shouting Copper show, a mail-order catalogue for every exhausted cliché of the genre – from the lazily rotating extractor fan which casts such a gothic light, to the stand-up rows in gloomy corridors. "Screw up on my territory again, and I'll make sure you're not in charge of a whelk stall before I'm finished with you."

== Cast ==
- Kevin McNally as Superintendent Graham Kirsten
- Peter Howitt as Superintendent Nick Jarratt
- Simon Kunz as DCI Adrian Jackson
- Clare Holman as DI Louise Raynor
- Hywel Bennett as DS Eddie Spader
- David Sibley as DCI David Lennox
- Jay Villiers as DS Lacey
- Philip Glenister as DS Danny Curtis
- Kevin Dignam as DS Alick Jackson
- Mac Andrews as DS Marshall
- Dido Miles as DS Elsa Cooper
- Chris Brailsford as DC Ryan
- Justin Chadwick as DC Clive Reilly
- Annie Keller as DC Lizzie Harlech
- David Baukham as ACC Gordon Pierce
- Anthony Carrick as ACC Henry Barton
- Amelia Bullmore as Caroline Poole
- Fay Ripley as Elizabeth Kirsten
- David Tse as DS Bailey
- Vivienne Ritchie as Kate Jarratt
- Sophie Ellis-Bextor as Rosie Jarrett

== Episodes ==
No.	Title	Directed by	Written by	British air date
1	"Two Teenagers Kidnapped"	Andrew Piddington	Sandy Welch & Stephen Poliakoff	7 May 1996
2	"Casual Bank Robbers"	Andrew Piddington	Sandy Welch & Stephen Poliakoff	14 May 1996
3	"Overseas Politicians"	Michael Whyte	Sandy Welch & Stephen Poliakoff	21 May 1996
4	"Date Rape"	Michael Whyte	Sandy Welch & Stephen Poliakoff	28 May 1996
5	"Cheerleader Murder"	Michael Whyte	Sandy Welch & Stephen Poliakoff	4 June 1996
6	"Palmer is Found Murdered"	Michael Whyte	Sandy Welch & Stephen Poliakoff	25 June 1996
