= Embroideries (comic) =

Comic by Marjane Satrapi

Embroideries (Broderies)
- Date: 2005
- Page count: 144 pages
- Publisher: Pantheon Books

Creative team
- Creator: Marjane Satrapi

Original publication
- Published in: L'Association
- Date of publication: 2003
- Language: French

Translation
- Publisher: Pantheon Books
- Date: 2005
- ISBN: 0375714677
- Translators: Anjali Singh

Embroideries is a 2003 comic by Marjane Satrapi. It was first published as Broderies in French (2003), before being published as Embroideries in English (2005). Embroideries is set in Tehran and features a young Satrapi conversing with her mother, grandmother, neighbours, and relatives about their relationships, sex, and love.

== Production ==
Satrapi described the process of creating Embroideries as a "big challenge" due to the setting of seven characters remaining in the same room.

== Synopsis ==
Embroideries is framed through an afternoon of tea drinking in Tehran, featuring Satrapi's grandmother, aunt, mother, neighbours, and friends. The women discuss topics including love, sex, and relationships with men. Through the course of the comic, the women's conversations turn to arranged marriage, cosmetic surgery, adultery, and virginity.

== Publication history ==
Embroideries was originally published in 2003 in France as Broderies by L'Association. The book received a Spanish translation as Bordados, published by Norma Editorial in 2004. Embroideries was first published in English, having been translated by Anjali Singh, in 2005 by Pantheon Books. Embroideries was translated into German as Sticheleien for a 2016 publication by Edition Moderne.

== Reception ==
Writing in Women in French Studies, Olivia Donaldson said that the book "addresses a range of issues impacting Iranian women's bodies and lives and does so in a manner that promotes border-crossing dialogue that is important to cosmopolitan ethics and transnational feminist coalition" Jena Habegger-Conti, in Invisibility in visual and material culture, wrote that Embroideries offers an example of "seeing the invisible" in Iranian women's lives and discourses through the setting and focus of the text. Emaeil Zeiny Jelodar and Noraini MD Yusof, writing in The Southeast Asian Journal of English Language Studies, said that Satrapi choosing "to write about Iranian female sexuality in a memoir means a bold break from Iranian literary tradition where women were not allowed to write their life stories let alone writing about their sexuality."

Reflecting on the title of the text, Chris Reyns-Chikuma and Houssem Ben Lazreg wrote, in The Cambridge History of the Graphic Novel, that it "refers to both the work traditionally done by women whose stories are told here, but also, in Persian slang, to the surgery to reinstate a woman’s virginity". Reyns-Chikuma and Lazreg added that the idea of embroidering has a further "meta- level meaning, referring to the work of art itself including the graphic narrative as a rich text. This third meaning shows that this apparently simple story has more layers when seen not only as a narrative but also as a “text”. They suggested that "it is these "braidings" that give a specific, rich texture" to the comic.

Sharon L. Jansen, in Reading Women’s Worlds from Christine de Pizan to Doris Lessing, wrote that through Embroideries Satrapi "shows us what happens behind closed doors, when women gather together and engage in a lively, spirited, and private conversation".

In a review for Words Without Borders, Richard McGill Murphy said: "Yet contemporary politics are notably absent from Satrapi's narrative. The only sign that the revolution ever happened is that her female characters wear headscarves and enveloping black overcoats when they go out on dates. Which tells us something about the current state of revolutionary politics in Iran. For Satrapi and the disaffected Iranian generation that she represents, ignoring the regime is an eloquent political statement in itself."

Sarvi Batmanghelidj and Carey Hogg, reviewing Embroideries in The Virginia Quarterly Review, praised the book and said that "The allure of Embroideries lies not only in its irresistible and entertaining graphic narrative, but also in its ground-breaking, unconventional depicition of Iranian women" Batmanghelidj and Hogg: "The characters of Embroideries have the power to change hearts and minds, just as they have changed their own lives - through resilience, grace, and wit".

Embroideries was nominated for the 2003 Angoulême Album of the Year.
