= Vincent Paronnaud =

French comic artist (born 1970)

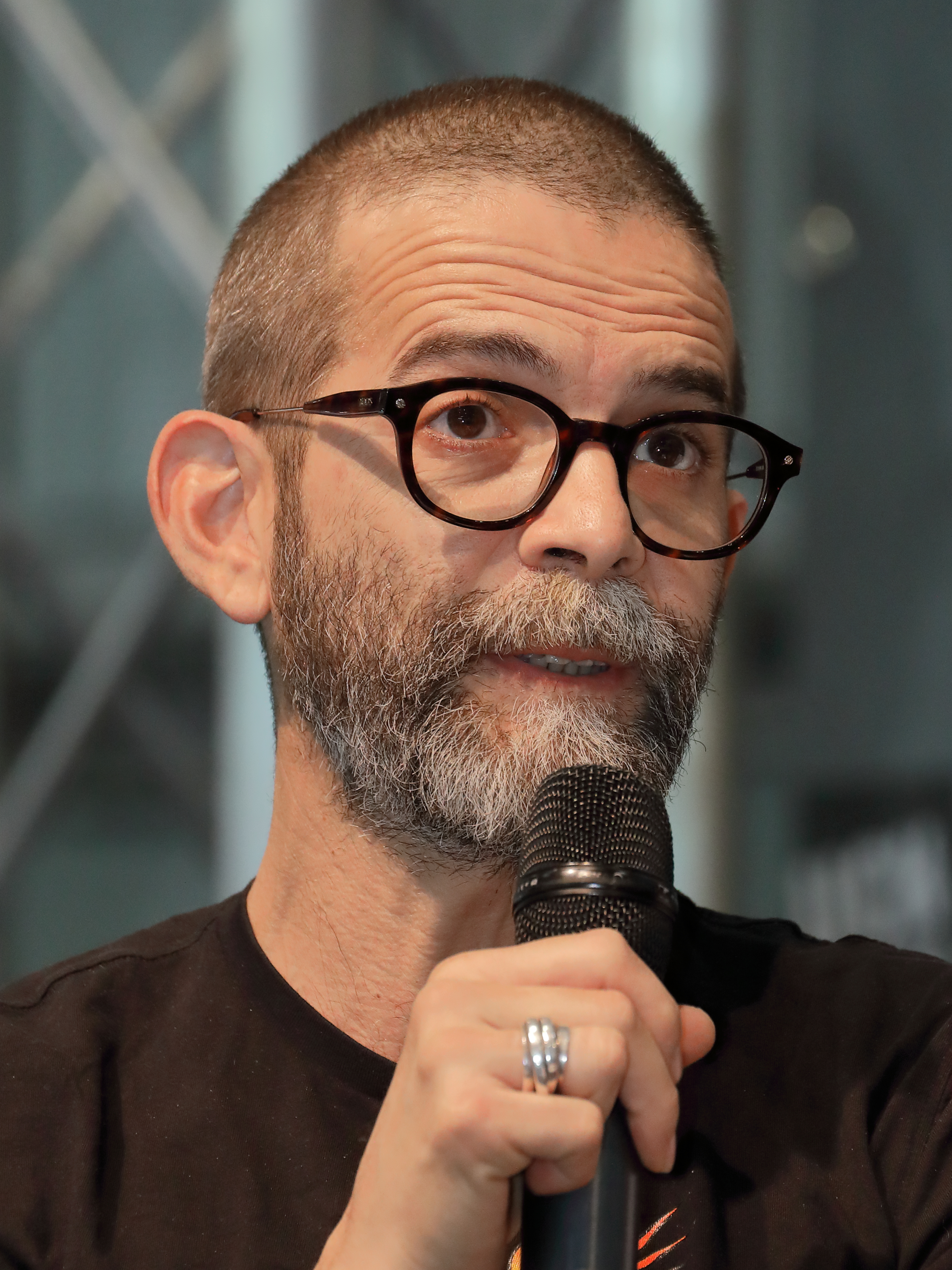
- Paronnaud in 2019
- Born: 20 February 1970 (age 56); La Rochelle, France
- Occupations: Comic artist, filmmaker

Vincent Paronnaud (born 20 February 1970), a.k.a. Winshluss, is a French comics artist and filmmaker.

== Biography ==
Paronnaud was born in La Rochelle. He is French comic book writer and artist. His works comprise one shots: Super negra (1999), Monsieur Ferraille (2001), Pat Boon (2001), Welcome to the Death Club (2002), Smart monkey (2002), Cornélius ou l'art de la mouscaille et du pinaillage (2007), Pinocchio (2008), Flip et Flopi 1996 1998, In God We Trust (2013) and Les fées – An electric story (2014), as well as comic book series (AUT) Winshluss (2004–2014) and Wizz et Buzz (2006–2007).

Paronnaud is best known for cowriting and codirecting with Marjane Satrapi the highly acclaimed animated film Persepolis (2007), for which they received numerous awards including the Jury Prize at the 2007 Cannes Film Festival and the César Award for Best First Film as well as an Academy Award nomination for Best Animated Feature.

== Work ==
=== Comics ===
- 1999 :
  - 7 Façons d'en finir avec l'humanité, Le dernier cri,
  - Super negra #1, Les Requins Marteaux
    - Wizz et Buzz, avec Cizo, Delcourt
- 2000 : Comix 2000, avec Cizo, L'Association (Album collectif noir et blanc)
- 2001 :
  - Welcome to the death club, 6 pieds sous terre; réédition avec inédits aux éditions Cornélius, 2010
  - Monsieur Ferraille, avec Cizo, Les Requins Marteaux
  - Pat Boon - "Happy End", L'Association
- 2004 : Smart Monkey, Cornélius
- 2006 : Tome 1 : Gras Double
- 2007 : Wizz et Buzz – Tome 2, Paris, Delcourt, Shampooing, 2007, 31p, ISBN 978-2-7560-0873-8, BnF 410994164
- 2008 : Pinocchio, Albi, Les Requins Marteaux, 2008, 187p, ISBN 978-2-84961-067-1, OCLC 470645596, BnF 41394167h – (Fauve d'or : prix du meilleur album – Festival d'Angoulême 2009)
- 2013 : In God We Trust, Bègles, Les Requins Marteaux, ISBN 978-2-84961-149-4, BnF 43706464w
- 2016 : Dans la forêt sombre et mystérieuse, Paris, Gallimard, 2016, 153p, ISBN 978-2-07-065570-0, BnF 451612440
- 2017 : Gang Of Four, Bègles, Les Requins Marteaux, 2017, ISBN 978-2-84961-233-0, BnF 45455798k
- 2019 : avec Véronique Bergen, L'anarchie – Théories et pratiques libertaires, Le Lombard, Coll. La petite bédéthèque savoirs, ISBN 978-2-8036-7578-4, 88 p.
- 2021 : J'ai tué le soleil, Paris, Gallimard, 2021, 200p ISBN 978-2-07-508410-9

=== Filmography ===
==== Long feature ====
- 2007 : Persepolis, with Marjane Satrapi
- 2009 : Villemolle 81
- 2011 : Poulet aux prunes, d'après et avec Marjane Satrapi
- 2020 : Hunted
- 2024 : Into the Wonderwoods

==== Short films ====
- Hollywood superstars avec Mr Ferraille - la biographie non autorisée de Monsieur Ferraille, faux documentaire de 23 minutes (avec Cizo)
- 2003 : Raging Blues, 6 minutes en noir et blanc (avec Cizo), 2003
- O’ boy, What nice legs !, 1 minute en noir et blanc (avec Cizo)
- 2010 : Il était une fois l'huile, Je suis bien content (14 minutes)
- 2014 : Territoire
- 2017 : La mort père et fils, (Court métrage d'animation, stop motion)
- 2018 : Welcome to the Death Club, (Court métrage d'animation)
- 2018 : The Bride, 20 minutes en noir et blanc.

== Exhibitions ==
- 2009 : Amour, Galerie Vallois, Paris, France
- 2013 : Winshluss, un monde merveilleux, Galerie des Jouets du Musée des arts décoratifs de Paris
- 2013 : Winshluss, un monde merveilleux, Galerie des Jouets du Musée des arts décoratifs de Paris
- 2016 : Dernière danse
- 2017 :
  - Winshluss, un monde merveilleux, Villa Bernasconi, Centre d'art grand Lancy, Suisse
  - Slow Future, Rencontre de la Bd et de l'illustration, Centre culturel Una Volta, Bastia, France
  - La belle vie numérique ! Espace foundation EDF, Paris, France
  - BD Factory, Galerie Vallois, Paris, France
  - Contre allées, Galerie Vallois, Paris, France
  - DEATH CLUB, Une exposition de Winshluss, Médiathèque de Bonlieu, Annecy, France
- 2018 : Gang of Four, Bibliothèque de Haillan, Bordeaux, France
- 2019 :
  - Jungle Fever, Galerie Vallois, Paris, France
  - Histoire de l'art cherche personnages, Bordeaux, France
- 2020 :
  - Raconter le cœur, Musée de la Vie romantique Paris, France
  - Retour vers le Futur, Galerie Vallois, Paris, France
  - Interférence rétroactive, Galerie Vallois, Paris, France

== Awards ==
- The Cinema for Peace Award for the Most Valuable Film of the Year, shared with Marjane Satrapi for Persepolis in 2008.
- Globe de Cristal for Best Film for Persepolis in 2008
- Prize for best album for Winshluss's Pinocchio, 2009 Festival International de la Bande Dessinée, Angoulême.
- Noor Iranian Film Festival award in 2013 for Best Animation Director, shared with Marjane Satrapi, on Chicken with Plums
