= Gang of the Jotas =

2012 crime comedy film by Marjane Satrapi

- Film poster
- La Bande des Jotas
- Directed by: Marjane Satrapi
- Written by: Marjane Satrapi
- Produced by: François-Xavier Decraene; Antoine Marbach (co-producer); Damien Stumpf (co-producer)
- Edited by: Stéphane Roche
- Music by: Elise Luguern (music supervisor); Frederic Sans (composer: additional music)
- Production companies: TAJ Poductions; Atelier VFX
- Distributed by: Urban Distribution (France)
- Release dates: 16 November 2012 (Rome Film Festival); 2 June 2013 (France)
- Running time: 75 minutes
- Countries: France; Belgium
- Language: French

The Gang of the Jotas (In French: La Bande des Jotas) is a 2012 French-language French-Belgian crime comedy film directed by Iranian-French film director Marjane Satrapi.

== Plot ==
A woman picks up the wrong suitcase at an airport in Spain and finds that it belongs to two gay amateur badminton players preparing for a tournament. She discloses that she is fleeing from a gang that murdered her sister and tells them tales about the various people coming to kill her. The men are unsure of the veracity of her stories but find themselves inextricably entangled in her life, killing her purported pursuers.

== Cast ==
- Marjane Satrapi as La femme (The Woman)
- Mattias Ripa as Nils
- Stéphane Roche as Didier
- Ali Mafakheri as José & Javier
- Maria de Medeiros as Maria

== Production and release ==
The actors playing the main characters in the film are also the figures behind the production. Satrapi wrote and directed the film, Ripa was the line producer, and Roche was the editor.

The film was shot in Spain.

The film premiered in a showing out of competition at the Rome Film Festival on November 16, 2012. This was followed by a showing at the (Göteborg International Film Festival) on January 29, 2013. The film was released theatrically in France on February 6, 2013.

== Reception ==
Reviews of the film were mediocre to negative.

Reviewer Dan Fainaru of Screen Daily wrote, "Satrapi wrote, directed and acts in this paper-thin lark that never pretends to have anything to say or make any sense. Eventually, given its high spirits, this might carve its own summer niche on the far margins of commercial cinema."

Reviewer Jay Weissberg of Variety wrote, "Little more than a well-made homemovie, the pic feels like a 'let's put on a show' venture in Spain, with Satrapi and friends doing double duty on and off the screen, channeling kooky caper comedies of yore."

The staff of theplaylist.com gave the film a "B" rating, writing, "Black comedy is among the hardest genres to do well, requiring a peculiar balance of elements to be sustained all the way through. And Satrapi is almost successful in pulling it off — almost, but not quite. Having been so assured and dynamic and funny for the first two acts, the pace slackens in the third, and the originality and energy that has abounded until then seems to dissipate. [...] It's as though Satrapi, having had such a great time along the way, can't quite work out the story's ending, and so doesn't really give it one."

Reviewer Jean-Christophe Nurbel of bellesdeculture.com wrote, "This film is part of a larger project, a collection of several films shot in different countries each time (in this case, Spain). The idea is to travel with a small crew (Marjane Satrapi, for example, is the actress, set designer, producer, director, and screenwriter on this film) and write the story day by day. In short, a film with no other ambition than to entertain. However, while the need to unwind is understandable, it isn't always necessary to film and share it. Let's hope Marjane Satrapi returns to writing and gives us more substantial stories to see and hear."
