= Mark Wadlow =

English screenwriter

- Born: 1962 (age 63–64); Middlesbrough, England
- Education: University of Leeds
- Occupation: Screenwriter
- Writing career
- Genres: Drama, comedy
- Notable works: Dear Rosie (1990); Coronation Street (1993—)

Mark Wadlow (born 1962) is an English screenwriter known for his partnership with Peter Morgan and his work on the ITV soap opera Coronation Street.

== Early life ==
Wadlow was born in Middlesbrough, England and attended St Francis Primary School. When he was 10, his family moved to the Hemlington area of the town, and he attended St George's Catholic School. At the age of 19, Wadlow began studying at the University of Leeds.

== Writing career ==
At Leeds, Wadlow began writing with Peter Morgan. In 1984, he and Morgan wrote a play entitled Gross, based on his summer job in a call centre, which they took to the Edinburgh Festival. At Edinburgh, Wadlow and Morgan were approached by a member of staff from a company that made training videos, who asked them if they would like jobs writing training films. Wadlow and Morgan accepted the job and wrote training films for many years. Wadlow and Morgan returned to Edinburgh in 1986 with the play Pax Britannica. In 1988, Wadlow and Morgan wrote additional material for Ruth Prawer Jhabvala's script for John Schlesinger's film Madame Sousatzka. Morgan recalled, "We were incredibly cheap and totally exploited for six months for about five grand". In 1990, Wadlow and Morgan co-wrote Dear Rosie, a short film directed by Peter Cattaneo. The short was nominated in the Best Short Film category at the 44th British Academy Film Awards, and the Short Film (Live Action) category at the 63rd Academy Awards.

After Wadlow and Morgan rewrote the script for the John Goodman film King Ralph (1991), they ended their writing partnership. Wadlow joined the writing staff of the ITV television soap opera Coronation Street in 1993 and has since become a senior storyliner. Throughout the rest of the 1990s, he wrote episodes of the topical comedy series The House of Windsor (1994), the soap opera Castles (1995), the sitcom Holding the Baby (1997), and the World Cup-themed comedy series Lost in France (1998). In 2000, he wrote an episode of the ITV prison drama Bad Girls and in 2006 wrote an episode of the BBC series Robin Hood.

As a member of the Coronation Street writing team, Wadlow has been the recipient of two Writers' Guild of Great Britain awards (1993 and 2009).

== List of works ==
=== Theatre ===
- Gross (1984, co-writer)
- Pax Britannica (1986, co-writer)

=== Film ===
- Madame Sousatzka (1988, co-writer)
- Dear Rosie (1990, co-writer)
- King Ralph (1991, co-writer, rewrites)
- The Silent Touch (1992, co-writer)

=== Television ===
- Coronation Street (1993—, 230+ episodes)
- The House of Windsor (1994, 6 episodes)
- Castles (1995, 2 episodes)
- Holding the Baby (1997, 5 episodes)
- Lost in France (1998, 12 episodes)
- Bad Girls (2000, 1 episode)
- Robin Hood (2006, 1 episode)

=== DVD film ===
- Coronation Street: Out of Africa (2008, co-writer)
