= Ghost Dance (film) =

1983 British film directed by Ken McMullen

DVD cover

Ghost Dance is a 1983 British film directed by Ken McMullen. This independent film explores the beliefs and myths surrounding the existence of ghosts and the nature of cinema. In it, Jacques Derrida explains his theory of the revenant, which is closely linked to media recording, especially in film.

== Plot ==
Through the experiences of two women in Paris and London, Ghost Dance offers an analysis of the complexity of our conceptions of ghosts, memory and the past. It is an adventure film strongly influenced by the work of Jacques Rivette and Jean-Luc Godard but with a unique intellectual and artistic discourse of its own and it is this that tempts the ghosts to appear, for Ghost Dance is permeated with all kinds of phantasmal presence. The film focuses on philosopher Jacques Derrida who considers ghosts to be the memory of something which has never been present. This theory is explored in the film.

This film has also been compared with the following works: Celine and Julie Go Boating, Thelma & Louise, O Lucky Man, Sans Soleil, Week End, and Viva Maria.

== Cast ==
- Leonie Mellinger
- Pascale Ogier
- Robbie Coltrane
- Jacques Derrida
- Dominique Pinon
- John Annette
- Stuart Brisley
- Barbara Coles

== Crew ==
- Producer - Ken McMullen
- Writer - Ken McMullen
- Cinematographer - Peter Harvey
- Music - David Cunningham, Michael Giles and Jamie Muir
