= Ken McMullen (film director) =

British film director (born 1948)

Ken McMullen (born 31 August 1948, Manchester) is a film director, artist and since 2012 Anniversary Professor of Film Studies at Kingston University, London. McMullen's films are grounded in philosophy, history, psychoanalysis and literature. McMullen's exhibition Signatures of the Invisible brought together artists and scientists working at CERN, the European particle physics facility near Geneva. His other work includes filming conversations with physicists at Stanford Linear Accelerator Centre, which he describes as "making a diary of the transition in human culture" because he believes physics is arriving at another shifting point. His latest work Arrows of Time is a radical new form of cinema consisting of 40 interchangeable elements that deal with literature, philosophy, and contemporary physics, premiered at the Museum of Modern Art in San Francisco in April 2007.

During the late 1990s and early 2000s McMullen also lectured and took tutor groups and what was then 'The London College of Printing and Distributive Trades' - now the London College of Communication. Attached to the department of Film and Television studies at the college's Back Hill facility, McMullen was popular with students.

== Selected filmography ==
- Hamlet Within (2022)
- Moments with Mujica (2021)
- The Ghost Within, film (2020)
- OXI: An Act of Resistance (2014)
- An Organization of Dreams (2009)
- Arrows of Time (2007)
- Art, Poetry and Particle Physics (2004)
- Pioneers in Art and Science: Metzger (2004)
- Lumin de Lumine (2001)
- Seven Sighs (1995)
- Lucky Man (1994), Documentary.
- There We Are, John (1993)
- 1867 (1990)
- 1871 (1990): a period film about the rise and fall of the Paris Commune in 1871. Produced by Stewart Richards and screened in the Un Certain Regard section at the 1990 Cannes Film Festival.
- Partition (1987): set in the turmoil surrounding the transfer of political power in British India from British to Indian hands and the partition of the subcontinent into The Dominion of Pakistan and The Republic of India in 1947.
- Zina (1985): comparable to a twentieth century Antigone, the titular daughter of Leon Trotsky discusses memories of her life and her father with the Berlinian psychotherapist Professor Kronfeld.
- Being and Doing (1984)
- Ghost Dance (1983): a journey into beliefs and myths surrounding the existence of ghosts and the nature of cinema.
- Patrick Hughes (1980)
- Patrick Heron (1979)
- Resistance (1976)
- Lovelies and Dowdies (1974)
- Joseph Beuys at the Tate and Whitechapel (1972)
