= Persepolis (film) =

2007 film by Marjane Satrapi and Vincent Paronnaud

- Theatrical release poster
- Directed by: Marjane Satrapi; Vincent Paronnaud
- Screenplay by: Marjane Satrapi; Vincent Paronnaud
- Based on: Persepolis by Marjane Satrapi
- Produced by: Marc-Antoine Robert; Xavier Rigault
- Starring: Chiara Mastroianni; Catherine Deneuve; Danielle Darrieux; Simon Abkarian; Gabriele Lopes
- Edited by: Stéphane Roche
- Music by: Olivier Bernet
- Production companies: 2.4.7. Films; France 3 Cinéma; The Kennedy/Marshall Company; Franche Connection Animations; Diaphana Distribution
- Distributed by: Diaphana Distribution (France); Sony Pictures Classics (United States)
- Release dates: 23 May 2007 (Cannes); 27 June 2007 (France); 25 December 2007 (United States)
- Running time: 96 minutes
- Countries: France; United States
- Language: French
- Budget: $7.3 million
- Box office: $22.8 million

Persepolis is a 2007 French-language animated film written and directed by Marjane Satrapi and Vincent Paronnaud, based on Satrapi's autobiographical graphic novel of the same name. The story follows a young girl as she comes of age against the backdrop of Iran's Islamic Revolution. The title references the historical city of Persepolis.

An international co-production between France and the United States, the film premiered at the 2007 Cannes Film Festival, where it co-won the Jury Prize, alongside Silent Light. It was released in France and Belgium on 27 June 2007, earning universal praise from critics. The film was selected as the French entry for the Best Foreign Language Film category and was nominated for Best Animated Feature at the 80th Academy Awards, making Satrapi the first woman to be nominated in that category.

== Plot ==
At Orly Airport in Paris, Marjane "Marji" Satrapi prepares to board a plane to Tehran, but changes her mind at the last moment. She spends the whole day at the airport, reflecting on her life before her departure from France.

During the 1979 Islamic Revolution against Shah Mohammad Reza Pahlavi, Marji's upper-middle-class family participates in the rallies, though she is forbidden from attending. Marji's uncle Anoosh comes to dinner upon release from prison, inspiring Marji with stories of his life on the run from the government. The Shah is deposed, and elections for a new leading power commence; Islamic fundamentalists win the elections and impose strict Islamic law, forcing women to dress "modestly" and wear headscarves. Anoosh is rearrested and executed for his political beliefs. Over time, many Iranians escape abroad.

The Iran–Iraq War breaks out and the Iranian government takes away even more social freedoms. Marji's uncle Taher suffers a heart attack and must go to England for surgery, but only those approved by the Board of Health can leave the country. When Marji's aunt seeks permission, she finds that the hospital director is her former window washer, who is incompetent and submissive to religion. Marji and her father visit Khosro for a fake passport. Khosro is sheltering Niloufar, a woman wanted for her Communist beliefs. When Niloufar is caught and executed, Khosro flees. Taher dies afterward.

As she grows up, Marji buys heavy metal music on the black market and wears Western clothing. When she rebuts a teacher's lies about government abuses, she is expelled. Fearing her arrest, her parents send her to a French lycée in Vienna to live with her mother's best friend. Marjane is later sent to live in a boarding house with Catholic nuns. Marji makes few friends and feels isolated. After she insults a nun, she is thrown out. She moves from house to house until she rents a room from Dr. Frau Schloss, a former teacher with an unstable personality.

One night, as she leaves a party where she lies about being French, Marji hears her grandmother's voice telling her to stay true to herself. She develops a relationship with Markus, but it ends after she catches him cheating on her with another woman. Schloss accuses Marji of stealing, and Marji leaves. She spends the day on a park bench, reflecting upon her actions and realizing she has nowhere to go. After living on the street for a few months, she contracts bronchitis and almost dies. She awakens in a Viennese hospital, where she is allowed to make a phone call home.

Marji returns to Iran with her family's hopes that the end of the war will improve their lives. She grows depressed, and attempts suicide by overdosing on medication. She dreams of meeting God, who insists that her time is not over. Jolted out of her depression, she attends university and starts dating fellow student Reza.

While waiting for Reza outside, Marji lies to a police officer to avoid arrest for wearing makeup, saying a man nearby who had been ogling her had made indecent comments to her. Her grandmother is disappointed and tells her that both her grandfather and her uncle died for freedom and that she should never sacrifice her integrity. Marji gives a speech during class, challenging the sexist double standard in the university's forum on public morality, but both Marji's and Reza's families are fined when the two are caught holding hands in public. Marji and Reza marry, but divorce a year later.

The fundamentalist police raid a party that Marji is attending. The women are detained while the men escape across the rooftops. One of them, Nima, falls to his death. Marji decides to leave Iran again. Before leaving, she visits the graves of her grandfather and uncle. Her mother forbids her from returning, and her grandmother dies soon after her departure.

In the present, at Orly, Marji gets into a taxi. As it leaves the airport, the driver asks where she is coming from. She replies, "Iran". She recalls her final memory of her grandmother.

== Cast ==
- Chiara Mastroianni as Marjane
- Catherine Deneuve as the mother

French version

- Danielle Darrieux as the grandmother
- Simon Abkarian as the father
- Gabriele Lopes as child Marjane
- François Jerosme as Uncle Anouche

English version

- Gena Rowlands as the grandmother
- Sean Penn as the father
- Amethyste Frezignac as child Marjane
- Iggy Pop as Uncle Anouche

== Production ==
=== Cinematography ===
The film is presented in the black-and-white style of the original graphic novels. Satrapi explains in a bonus feature on the DVD that this was so that the place and the characters would not look like foreigners in a foreign country but simply people in a country to show how easily a country can become like Iran. The present-day scenes are shown in color, while sections of the historic narrative resemble a shadow theater show. The design was created by art director and executive producer Marc Jousset. The animation is credited to the Perseprod studio and was created by two specialized studios, Je Suis Bien Content and Pumpkin 3D.

=== Animation and design ===
Written and directed by Marjane Satrapi and Vincent Paronnaud, the film was produced by 20 animators. Initially opposed to producing an animated film due to the high level of difficulty, producers Marc-Antoine Robert and Xavier Regault gave protagonist Satrapi various options to avoid animation. Robert said: "I know the new generation of French comic book artists quite well, and I'm afraid of Marjane's. I offered to write an original script for her, because I didn't want to work on an animated movie at all! ... I knew how complicated it was." In the end, the producers followed Satrapi's wishes and focused on interpreting her life story as depicted in her novel Persepolis. "With live-action, it would have turned into a story of people living in a distant land who don't look like us," Satrapi said. "At best, it would have been an exotic story, and at worst, a 'third-world' story."

The animation team worked alongside Satrapi to gain a detailed understanding of the types of graphic images she deemed necessary for accuracy. Following her guidelines, the animators, such as Marc Jousset, commented on their use of the "traditional animation techniques" Satrapi requested to keep the drawings simple and avoid the "more high-tech techniques" that "would look dated". Satrapi's vision, according to Jousset, involved a lot of focus on the characters' natural, humane physical imperfections.

During their initial stages of production, the animation team attempted to use 2D image techniques "on pen tablets", but were immediately unsatisfied with the product due to the lack of definition, Jousset has said. Applying traditional techniques as simple as paper and ink to the production allowed Satrapi to use methods she was familiar with. As a result, Satrapi crafted a depiction she recognized as her own work, and thus her own story.

Satrapi, along with the director and animation team, deliberately chose black and white as the film's dominant colors to continue on the path of traditional animation techniques. Despite its simplicity, members of the animation team such as Jousset discussed how black and white makes imperfections more obvious: "Using only black and white in an animation movie requires a great deal of discipline. From a technical point of view, you can't make any mistakes ... it shows up straight away on the large screen". In addition to color display, the animation team worked especially hard on techniques that mimicked the styles of Japanese comics, known as manga, and translating them into their own craft of "a specific style, both realistic and mature. No bluffing, no tricks, nothing overcooked". According to Jousset, "Marjane had quite an unusual way of working ... Marjane insisted on being filmed playing out all the scenes ... it was a great source of information for the animators, giving them an accurate approach to how they should work". With this in mind, the animators commented on the immense hardships they faced when creating each image of "1,200 shots" through Satrapi's perspective because even though "Marjane's drawings looked very simple and graphic ... they're very difficult to work on because there are so few identifying marks. Realistic drawings require outstanding accuracy".

Despite the difficulties in working with animation, Satrapi's determination to make the film motivated the animators to finish each graphic image with full accuracy. Following alongside a more traditional style of graphic imagery was not only difficult in terms of drawing, but also in terms of locating a team to draw the images since traditional animators "hardly exist in France anymore". With a group of more than 100 people, though, animator Pascal Chevé confirmed the variety of style each team member brought to the table: "An animator will be more focused on trying to make the character move in the right way. Assistant animators will then put the final touches to the drawings to make sure they're true to the original. Then the 'trace' team comes in, and they work on each drawing with ... a felt pen, to ensure that they are consistent with the line that runs throughout the movie".

Although it was hard to craft realistic cartoon drawings, Jousset said the biggest challenge was staying on schedule and within budget of "6 million Euros, which is reasonable for a 2D movie made in France", but that "I think the culmination of the fact that it was a true story, that the main character worked with you, that an animated movie dealt with a current issue and that it was intended for adults was tremendously exciting for the team".

== Release ==
The film premiered at the Cannes Film Festival on 23 May 2007, where it co-won the Jury Prize, alongside Silent Light. In her acceptance speech, Satrapi said, "Although this film is universal, I wish to dedicate the prize to all Iranians."

== Reception ==
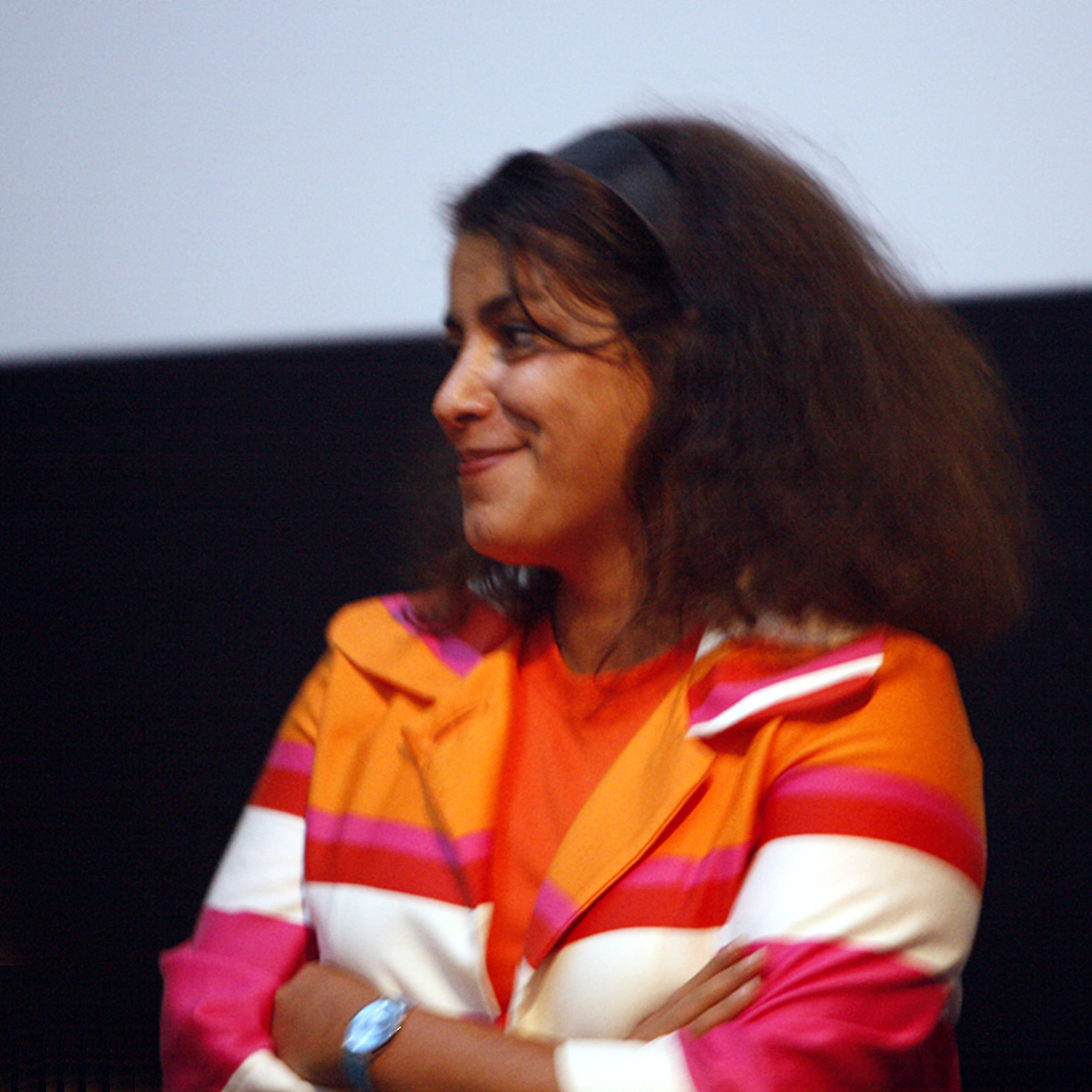
Writer-director Marjane Satrapi at the premiere of Persepolis

=== Critical response ===
On the review aggregator website Rotten Tomatoes, the film holds an approval rating of 96%, based on 163 reviews, with an average rating of 8.5/10. The website's critics consensus reads, "Persepolis is an emotionally powerful, dramatically enthralling autobiographical gem, and the film's simple black-and-white images are effective and bold." Metacritic, which uses a weighted average, assigned the film a score of 90 out of 100, based on 31 critics, indicating "universal acclaim".

Roger Ebert of the Chicago Sun-Times gave the film four stars out of four, writing that although its black and white animation "may sound Spartan", it is "surprisingly involving" and that Satrapi's story is told "caringly, lovingly and with great style". He added, "while so many films about coming of age involve manufactured dilemmas, here is one about a woman who indeed does come of age, and magnificently."

A. O. Scott, reviewing for The New York Times, was fascinated by the film and said, "Persepolis, austere as it may look, is full of warmth and surprise, alive with humor and a fierce independence of spirit".

Time's Richard Corliss ranked the film sixth on his list of the "Top 10 Movies" of 2007, calling it "a coming-of-age tale that manages to be both harrowing and exuberant".

The film was ranked number 58 on Empire's "The 100 Best Films of World Cinema" in 2010. In 2024, Looper ranked it 30th on its list of the "50 Best PG-13 Movies of All Time", writing: "Adapting a graphic novel into a feature film can be a bittersweet experience, as often these properties are translated into live-action films that erase the distinctive hand-drawn artwork of their source material. Thankfully, author Marjane Satrapi adapts her work Persepolis into a film of the same name through hand-drawn animation, which maintains the wonderfully idiosyncratic imagery of her original work."

=== International government reaction ===
The film drew complaints from the Iranian government. Even before its debut at the 2007 Cannes Film Festival, the government-connected Iran Farabi Foundation sent a letter to the French embassy in Tehran reading, "This year the Cannes Film Festival, in an unconventional and unsuitable act, has chosen a movie about Iran that has presented an unrealistic face of the achievements and results of the glorious Islamic Revolution in some of its parts." Despite such objections, the Iranian cultural authorities relented in February 2008 and allowed limited screenings of the film in Tehran, albeit with six scenes censored due to sexual content.

In June 2007, the film was dropped from the lineup of the Bangkok International Film Festival. Festival director Chattan Kunjara na Ayudhya said, "I was invited by the Iranian embassy to discuss the matter and we both came to mutual agreement that it would be beneficial to both countries if the film was not shown" and "It is a good movie in artistic terms, but we have to consider other issues that might arise here."

Persepolis was initially banned in Lebanon after some clerics found it "offensive to Iran and Islam." The ban was later revoked after an outcry in Lebanese intellectual and political circles.

=== Screening controversies ===
On 7 October 2011, the film was shown on the Tunisian private television station Nessma. The following day, a demonstration formed and marched on the station. The main Islamic party in Tunisia, Ennahda, condemned the demonstration. Nabil Karoui, the owner of Nessma TV, faced trial in Tunis on charges of "violating sacred values" and "disturbing the public order." He was found guilty and ordered to pay a fine of 2,400 dinars ($1,700; £1,000), a much more lenient punishment than predicted. Amnesty International said that criminal proceedings against Karoui are an affront to freedom of expression.

== Accolades ==
80th Academy Awards

- Nominated: Best Animated Feature. Additionally, it is the first traditionally animated nominee since 2005's Howl's Moving Castle. It was also France's Best Foreign Language Film entry, but was not nominated.

65th Golden Globe Awards

- Nominated: Best Foreign Language Film

62nd British Academy Film Awards

- Nominated: Best Film Not in the English Language
- Nominated: Best Animated Film

35th Annie Awards

- Nominated: Best Animated Feature
- Nominated: Directing in an Animated Feature Production
- Nominated: Music in an Animated Feature Production
- Nominated: Writing in an Animated Feature Production

33rd César Awards

- Won: Best First Feature Film (Vincent Paronnaud and Marjane Satrapi)
- Won: Best Adaptation (Vincent Paronnaud and Marjane Satrapi)
- Nominated: Best Editing (Stéphane Roche)
- Nominated: Best Film
- Nominated: Best Music Written for a Film (Olivier Bernet)
- Nominated: Best Sound (Samy Bardet, Eric Chevallier and Thierry Lebon)

2007 Cannes Film Festival

- Tied: Jury Prize
- Nominated: Palme d'Or

20th European Film Awards

- Nominated: Best Film

3rd Globes de Cristal Award

- Won: Best Film

2007 London Film Festival

- Southerland Trophy (Grand prize of the festival)

2007 Cinemanila International Film Festival

- Special Jury Prize

2007 São Paulo International Film Festival

- Won: Best Foreign Language Film

2007 Vancouver International Film Festival

- Won: Rogers People's Choice Award for Most Popular International Film

2009 Silver Condor Awards

- Won: Silver Condor Award for Best Foreign Film

== See also ==
- Iranian cinema
- List of animated feature-length films
- List of films based on French-language comics
- Arthouse animation
- Independent animation
- List of submissions to the 80th Academy Awards for Best Foreign Language Film
- List of French submissions for the Academy Award for Best Foreign Language Film
- The Breadwinner (2017 film), another animated film based on a novel

== Works cited ==
- Hohenadel, Kristin (21 January 2007). "An Animated Adventure, Drawn From Life". The New York Times. Archived from the original on 14 November 2014.
- Thompson, N. P. (26 January 2008). "Iranian life in cartoon motion". Northwest Asian Weekly. Archived from the original on 30 November 2012.
- Satrapi, Marjane (February 2008). "Marjane Satrapi". ION Magazine (Interview). Interviewed by Michael Mann.
- DePaul, Amy (5 February 2008). "Man with a Country". Guernica.
- Warren, Kate (Winter 2010). "Persepolis: Animation, Representation and the Power of the Personal Story" (PDF). Screen Education (58): 117–23.
- Anselmi, William; Wilson, Sheena (30 September 2015). "Technologies of Memory, Identity, and Oblivion in Persepolis (2007) and Waltz with Bashir (2008)". In Mannani, Manijeh; Thompson, Veronica (eds.). Familiar and Foreign: Identity in Iranian Film and Literature. Athabasca University Press. pp. 215–237. ISBN 9781927356869.
- Ristola, Jacqueline (31 December 2016). "Recreating Reality: Waltz With Bashir, Persepolis, and the Documentary Genre". Animation Studies 11. doi:10.17613/M60J79. ISSN 1930-1928.
- Massoumi, Nariman (17 February 2025), "The Family Idyll, Exclusion and Ideology in Persepolis", in Rethinking Migration, edited by Bridget Anderson, Bristol University Press, pp. 175–193, doi:10.56687/9781529234497015, ISBN 9781529234497, retrieved 17 June 2025.
