= Marjane Satrapi =

French and Iranian author and director (1969–2026)

- مرجان ساتراپی
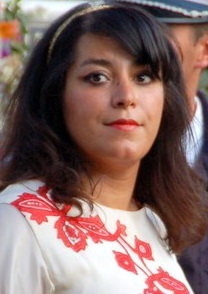
- Satrapi in 2008
- Born: Marjane Ebrahimi; 21 September 1969; Rasht, Imperial State of Iran
- Died: 3 June 2026 (aged 56); Paris, France
- Citizenship: Iran; France
- Occupations: Artist; film director; writer
- Notable work: Persepolis; Chicken with Plums; The Voices; Embroideries; Radioactive
- Spouses: Reza (m. 1989; div. 1994); Mattias Ripa (m. 1996; died 2025)
- Awards: Full list

Marjane Satrapi (French: [maʁʒan satʁapi]; Persian: مرجان ساتراپی [mæɾˈdʒɒːn(e) sɒːtɾɒːˈpiː]; (Note: The [-e] is the izāfa, which is a grammatical marker linking two words together. It is not indicated in writing, and is not part of the name itself, but is pronounced in Persian language when a first and last name are used together.) 21 September 1969 – 3 June 2026) was an Iranian-French comic book author, film director, and children's book author. Her best-known works include the graphic novel Persepolis and its film adaptation; the graphic novel Chicken with Plums; Woman, Life, Freedom; and the Marie Curie biopic Radioactive.

The success of Persepolis established Satrapi as one of the most widely read Iranian authors in the world, and her role in co-directing the film adaptation led to her becoming the first woman to be nominated for an Academy Award for Best Animated Feature.

== Early life ==
Satrapi was born on 21 September 1969 in Rasht, northwestern Iran, where she spent her first 20 days before the family moved to Tehran, where she grew up in an upper-middle class Iranian family and attended the French-language Razi High School.

Both her parents were politically active and supported leftist causes against the monarchy of the last Shah. According to Satrapi, her maternal great-grandfather was Naser al-Din Shah Qajar, the shah of Iran from 1848 to 1896. Satrapi said her maternal grandfather was once the governor of Gilan province. Her early years overlapped with a significant era in Iranian history. After the Iranian Revolution in 1979, her parents lived under the rule of the Islamic fundamentalists who had taken power. At nine years old, Satrapi observed the 1979 Iranian Revolution, which significantly altered the nation's political and social environment. The difference between her life in Iran and her time spent overseas shaped her artistic expression.

During her youth, Satrapi was exposed to the growing brutalities of the various regimes. Many of her family and friends were persecuted, arrested, and murdered by the regime's enforcers. She greatly admired her paternal uncle, Anushirvan Ebrahimi. In turn, he doted on her and treated her more as a daughter than a niece. According to Marjane, uncle Anoosh (as she called him) had previously joined Fereydun Ebrahimi in Azerbaijan. After the Azerbaijan People's Government collapsed, he became a political prisoner and spent time in exile in the Soviet Union. Upon his return to Iran, Ebrahimi was arrested again in 1982 and sentenced to death; he requested Satrapi when allowed to select a single visitor the night before his execution. His body was buried in an unmarked grave at the Evin Prison.

Although Satrapi's parents encouraged her to be strong-willed and defend her rights, they grew concerned for her safety. In her teens, she skirted trouble with police for disregarding modesty codes and buying music banned by the regime.

When Satrapi was 14, her parents arranged for her to live with a family friend to study abroad, and in 1983 she arrived in Vienna, Austria, to attend the Lycée Français de Vienne. She stayed in Vienna through her secondary school years, often moving from one residence to another and sometimes staying at friends' homes. Feeling like an outsider even among friends, Satrapi turned to drugs and struggled academically after a breakup. Eventually, she became homeless and lived on the streets for three months, until she was hospitalized for a near-fatal bout of bronchitis. Despite the hardships, in Austria she began to embrace and take pride in her Iranian heritage.

Upon recovery, she returned to Iran and studied visual communication, obtaining a master's degree from Islamic Azad University in Tehran. During this time, the Guardians of the Revolution took complete control.

When she was 21, Satrapi married a veteran of the Iran–Iraq War named Reza, whom she divorced after five years. After the divorce, she moved to Strasbourg, France, to study at the Haute école des arts du Rhin (HEAR). Her parents encouraged her to stay in Europe permanently. Along with her native language, Farsi, she spoke five European languages: French, English, Swedish, German, and Italian.

== Career ==
=== Comics ===
Satrapi became famous worldwide for her autobiographical comic books, originally published in French in four parts from 2000 to 2003 and in English in two parts in 2003 and 2004, respectively, as Persepolis and Persepolis 2. They depict her childhood in Iran and adolescence in Europe following the Iranian revolution.

Satrapi preferred the term "comic book" to "graphic novel". "People are so afraid to say the word 'comic'", she told The Guardian in 2011. "It makes you think of a grown man with pimples, a ponytail and a big belly. Change it to 'graphic novel' and that disappears. No: it's all comics."

In 2019, Persepolis ranked 47th on The Guardian's list of the 100 best books of the 21st century. In 2024, it ranked 48th on the New York Times's list of the 100 best books of the 21st century.

Persepolis won the Angoulême Coup de Coeur Award at the Angoulême International Comics Festival. In 2013, Chicago schools were ordered by the district to remove Persepolis from classrooms because of its graphic language and violence. The ban incited protests and controversy. Her later publication Embroideries (Broderies) was also nominated for the Angoulême Album of the Year award in 2003, an award her graphic novel Chicken with Plums (Poulet aux prunes) won in 2005. She also contributed to the op-ed section of The New York Times.

ComicsAlliance listed Satrapi as one of 12 women cartoonists deserving of lifetime achievement recognition.

=== Films ===
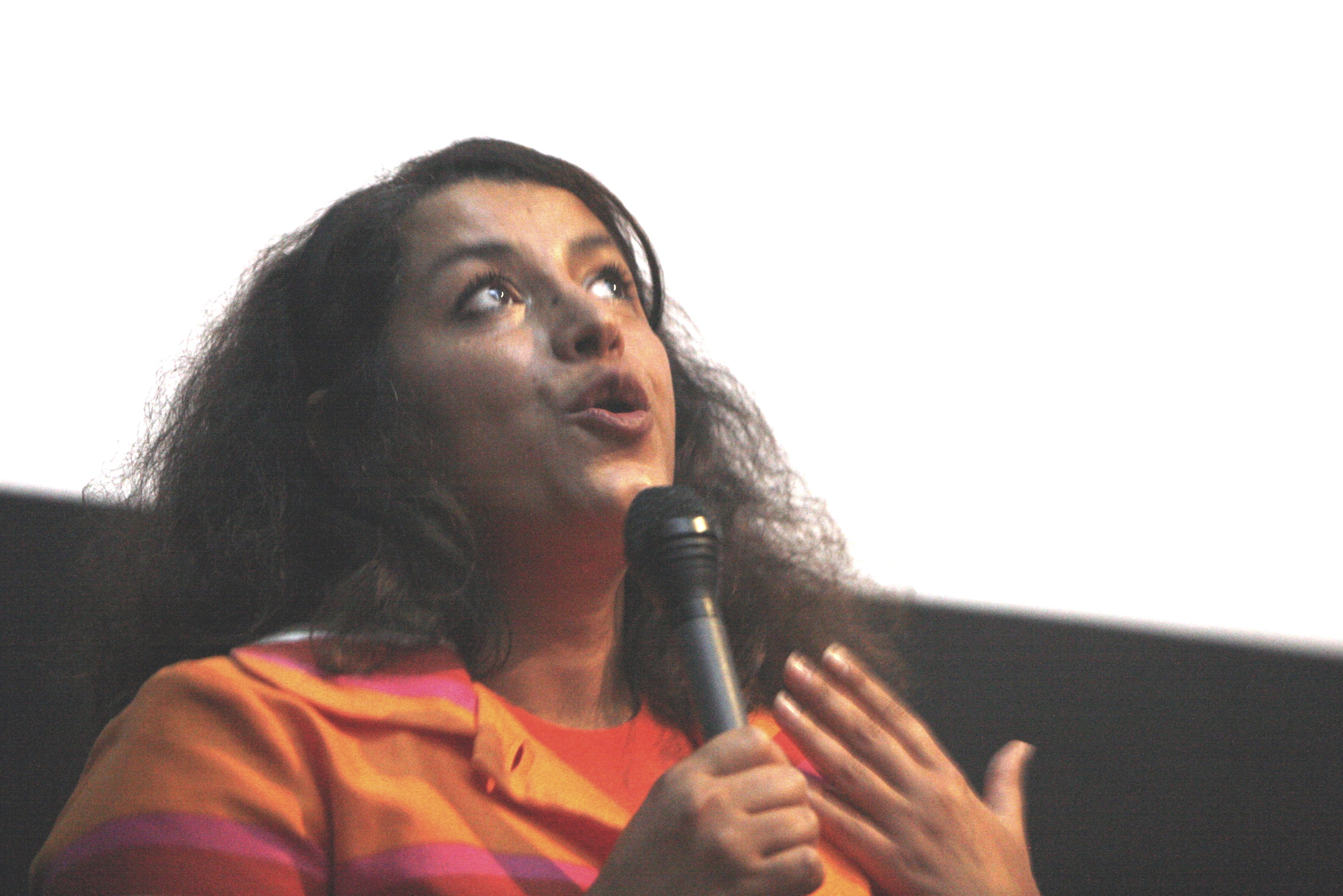
Satrapi at the premiere of Persepolis

Persepolis was adapted into an animated film of the same name. It debuted at the 2007 Cannes Film Festival in May and shared a Special Jury Prize with Carlos Reygadas's Silent Light (Luz silenciosa). Co-written and co-directed by Satrapi and director Vincent Paronnaud, the French-language picture stars the voices of Chiara Mastroianni, Catherine Deneuve, Danielle Darrieux, and Simon Abkarian. The English version, starring the voices of Gena Rowlands, Sean Penn, and Iggy Pop, was nominated for Best Animated Feature at the 80th Academy Awards in January 2008. Satrapi was the first woman to be nominated for the award. The Iranian government denounced the film and got it dropped from the Bangkok International Film Festival. Persepolis was a successful film commercially (with over a million admissions in France alone) and critically, winning Best First Film at the César Awards 2008. The film reflects many tendencies of first-time filmmaking in France, such as a focus on intimate rites of passage and ambivalent recounting of coming-of-age moments.

In late 2011, Satrapi and Paronnaud continued their success with another film adaptation of one of Satrapi's graphic novels—the live-action comedy drama Chicken with Plums. It follows one of Satrapi's relatives' final days, as he has lost the will to live.

In 2012, Satrapi directed and acted in the crime comedy film Gang of the Jotas, from her own screenplay.

In 2014, Satrapi directed the black comedy film The Voices, from a screenplay by Michael R. Perry. The film stars Ryan Reynolds, Anna Kendrick, and Gemma Arterton, and follows a factory worker with schizophrenia whose hallucinations drive him to commit murder while conversing with his talking pets and the severed heads of his victims.

In 2019, Satrapi directed Radioactive, a biopic of two-time Nobel Prize winner Marie Curie. It is an adaptation of a book of the same name. Initially intended to premiere in 2020, it was canceled due to the COVID-19 pandemic and later released online.

In 2021, Satrapi starred in the French animated short film The Soloists, voicing Ava, one of the three eponymous sisters fighting to express their musical talents in a country with blatantly sexist laws.

In 2024, Satrapi directed another black comedy, Dear Paris (Paradis Paris), which was featured at the Torino Film Festival. It explores several interconnected stories of people's lives affected by death.

=== Political activism ===
After the Iranian elections in June 2009, Satrapi and Iranian filmmaker Mohsen Makhmalbaf appeared before Green Party members in the European Parliament to present a document allegedly received from a member of the Iranian electoral commission claiming that the reform candidate, Mir Hossein Mousavi, had actually won the election, and that the conservative incumbent, Mahmoud Ahmedinejad, had received only 12% of the vote.

In 2022, Satrapi voiced her support for the Mahsa Amini protests. She continued on this path by directing and coordinating a graphic anthology documenting the uprising and its cultural context for Western audiences in solidarity with these women. She believed in the Woman, Life, Freedom movement as a cultural revolution. She also supported protests for freedom and rights against the regime in Iran.

In January 2025, Satrapi refused the Legion of Honour, France's highest and most prestigious award, citing French hypocrisy toward Iranian people. In an open letter addressed to the Minister of Culture, she explained her discontent regarding the visa policy of France, writing, "I can't continue seeing the children of Iranian oligarchs come to spend their holidays in France, even become naturalised, while at the same time young dissidents have difficulty in obtaining a tourist visa to come to see what the country of the Enlightenment and human rights looks like." She wrote, "supporting the women's revolution in Iran cannot be reduced to photos with victims or celebrities during commemorations of the death of Mahsa Amini ... Iranians don't need communication, we need concrete actions." Satrapi emphasised that her rejection of the decoration "is in no way an action or a thought against France. On the contrary, I deeply love this country, which is my country."

== Personal life and death ==
Satrapi lived in Paris, France, where she met Swedish actor and producer Mattias Ripa. She was married to Ripa until his death from cancer on 8 April 2025, at the age of 53. After Ripa's death, Satrapi founded the Mattias and Marjane Ripa-Satrapi Cinema Foundation as a way to provide support for foreign students who want to study filmmaking in Paris.

Satrapi experienced severe depression after Ripa died, and in April 2026 she visited a clinic in Munich, Germany, hoping to recover. Satrapi died on 3 June 2026. (Note: There were discrepancies about not only Satrapi's date of death, but when the death had been announced. Satrapi's family made the announcement through Agence France-Presse on 4 June, but sources such as La Croix and Variety, when referencing the statement, gave the announcement date as 3 June. Subsequent reporting gave the 4th as the date of death, with the Académie des Beaux-Arts, of which Satrapi was a member, publishing an announcement that Satrapi died on the 4th. But her death certificate states that she died on 3 June. This settles the matter, and incidentally corrects her birthdate, which was erroneously thought to be 22 November 1969 and is in fact 21 September 1969. See also .) Her family released an announcement saying she had "died of sadness" over her husband's death. Numerous public figures paid tribute to Satrapi, including writer Margaret Atwood, President of France Emmanuel Macron, Iranian human rights activist Narges Mohammadi, and actress Rosamund Pike, who starred in Satrapi's film Radioactive.

Satrapi's funeral was held on 19 June 2026 at the Père Lachaise Cemetery, where she was buried. With the funeral open to the public, attendees included actresses Catherine Deneuve and Golshifteh Farahani.

== Works ==
=== French ===
- Persepolis, vol. 1 (2000). Paris: L'Association, ISBN 2-84414-058-0.
- Persepolis, vol. 2 (2001). L'Association, ISBN 2-84414-079-3.
- Persepolis, vol. 3 (2002). L'Association, ISBN 2-84414-104-8.
- Persepolis, vol. 4 (2003). L'Association, ISBN 2-84414-137-4.
- Sagesses et malices de la Perse (2001, with Lila Ibrahim-Ouali and Bahman Namwar-Motalg, Albin Michel, ISBN 2-226-11872-1)
- Les monstres n'aiment pas la lune (2001, Nathan Jeunesse, ISBN 2-09-282094-X)
- Ulysse au pays des fous (2001, with Jean-Pierre Duffour, Nathan Jeunesse, ISBN 2-09-210847-6)
- Ajdar (2002, Nathan Jeunesse, ISBN 2-09-211033-0)
- Broderies (2003, L'Association, ISBN 2-84414-095-5)
- Poulet aux prunes (2004). Paris: L'Association, ISBN 2-84414-159-5.
- Le Soupir (2004, Bréal Jeunesse, ISBN 2-7495-0325-6)
- Femme, vie, liberté (2023, L'Iconoclaste, ISBN 2-37880-378-8)

=== English ===
- Persepolis: The Story of a Childhood. Vol. 1. New York: Pantheon Books. 2003. ISBN 978-0-375-42230-0.
- Persepolis: The Story of a Return. Vol. 2. New York: Pantheon Books. 2004. ISBN 978-0-375-42288-1.
- The Complete Persepolis. New York: Pantheon Books. 2007. ISBN 978-0-375-71483-2.
- Embroideries (2005, Pantheon ISBN 978-0-375-42305-5)
- Chicken with Plums (2006). New York: Pantheon Books, ISBN 978-0-375-42415-1.
- Monsters Are Afraid of the Moon (2006, Bloomsbury, ISBN 1-58234-744-1)
- The Sigh. Bloom Entertainment. 2011. ISBN 978-1-936393-46-6
- Woman, Life, Freedom. Seven Stories Press. 2024. ISBN 978-1-64421-405-3.

== Filmography ==
Year	Title	Director	Writer	Notes	Ref.
2007	Persepolis	Yes	Yes	Co-directed with Vincent Paronnaud	
2011	Chicken with Plums	Yes	Yes	Co-directed with Vincent Paronnaud	
2012	Gang of the Jotas	Yes	Yes		
2014	The Voices	Yes	No		
2019	Radioactive	Yes	No		
2024	Dear Paris	Yes	Yes		

Acting roles

Year	Title	Role	Notes	Ref.
2007	Persepolis	Actress/Gossip/Schloss (narration)	Voice roles	
2009	The French Kissers	Saleswoman from the music store		
2012	Gang of the Jotas	The woman		
2017	The Simpsons	Herself (narration)	Episode: "Springfield Splendor"	
2021	The Soloists	Ava	Voice role	
2024	Dear Paris	Director of the action film		

== Awards and nominations ==
Year	Award	Category	Title	Result	Ref.
2007	Cinema for Peace Foundation	Most Valuable Film of the Year	Persepolis	Won	
2007	Academy Awards	Best Animated Feature	Persepolis	Nominated	
2007	BAFTA Awards	Best Film Not in the English Language	Persepolis	Nominated	
2007	BAFTA Awards	Best Animated Film	Persepolis	Nominated	
2007	Golden Globe Awards	Best Foreign Language Film	Persepolis	Nominated	

Other awards

- 2001: Angoulême Coup de Coeur Award for Persepolis
- 2002: Angoulême Prize for Scenario for Persepolis: Tome 2
- 2005: Angoulême Best Comic Book Award for Poulet aux prunes
- 2007: Jury Prize for Persepolis (tied with Silent Light), Cannes Film Festival
- 2007: Best Animation: Los Angeles Film Critics Association
- 2008: Gat Perich Award
- 2008: Lulu of the Year Award (Friends of Lulu)
- 2009: Doctor honoris causa both at the Katholieke Universiteit Leuven and the Université catholique de Louvain from Belgium
- 2013: Noor Iranian Film Festival award for Best Feature Film Director (shared with Vincent Paronnaud), for Chicken with Plums
- 2024: Princess of Asturias Award for Communication and Humanities.
- 2025: (Declined) Legion of Honour.

== See also ==
- List of Iranian women in design
- List of women comics creators
