= Holding the Baby (British TV series) =

- Genre: Sitcom
- Created by: Dominic Minghella; Mark Wadlow
- Starring: Nick Hancock (Series 1); Hugh Bonneville (Series 2)
- Country of origin: United Kingdom
- Original language: English
- No. of series: 2
- No. of episodes: 12

Production
- Running time: 30 minutes (including adverts)
- Production company: Granada Television

Original release
- Network: ITV
- Release: 24 January 1997 – 13 August 1998

Holding the Baby is a 1997 British sitcom television series produced by Granada Television that aired on ITV. It lasted for two series between 24 January 1997 and 13 August 1998. The series focusses on Gordon Muir, whose wife leaves him for a younger man, and he's left to raise his baby son Daniel single handedly, whilst trying to balance his career. He is helped and hindered by his loutish brother Rob who later moves in, which makes his life harder to manage; whilst he faces constant advice by his intrusive neighbour Laura.

The series' average audience in 1997 was 6.85 million viewers, making it the 16th-highest rated British sitcom that year.

Nick Hancock left after Series 1, and was replaced by Hugh Bonneville in Series 2. Due to low audience ratings, the series was pulled from transmission halfway through the 2nd series. Two more episodes were shown in August 1998, before the series was subsequently cancelled. Another two episodes were additionally produced, but remain unbroadcast.

It was later remade in the United States for Fox Television in 1998; the U.S. version lasted only one season.

== Cast ==
- Nick Hancock as Gordon Muir (Series 1)
- Hugh Bonneville as Gordon Muir (Series 2)
- Joe Duttine as Rob Muir
- Sally Phillips as Laura
- Lou Gish as Claire

== Episode list ==
=== Series 1 (1997) ===
No. overall	No. in series	Title	Original release date
1	1	"Where's My Wife?"	24 January 1997
2	2	"Not Chicken Pox"	31 January 1997
3	3	"Mums and Toddlers Club"	7 February 1997
4	4	"A Full Time Parent"	14 February 1997
5	5	"Nanny"	21 February 1997
6	6	"Gifted"	28 February 1997
7	7	"Daniel's Granny"	7 March 1997

=== Series 2 (1998) ===
No. overall	No. in series	Title	Original release date
8	1	"Au Revoir L'amour"	28 April 1998
9	2	"Happy Families"	5 May 1998
10	3	"Dark and Stormy Nights"	12 May 1998
11	4	"Weekending"	6 August 1998
12	5	"Space Invaders"	13 August 1998
