= Geraldine McGinty =

Geraldine B. McGinty
- Born: England
- Education: National University of Ireland, Galway (MB BCh BAO); Columbia University (MBA)
- Known for: Chair of the American College of Radiology, Healthcare payment policy reform
- Awards: ACR Gold Medal (2024), Fellow of the ACR (FACR) (2013)
- Scientific career
- Fields: Radiology; Women's imaging; Healthcare economics; Healthcare leadership
- Workplaces: Weill Cornell Medicine; NewYork-Presbyterian Hospital

Geraldine B. McGinty is an Irish-American radiologist, healthcare strategist, and academic administrator. She is the Senior Associate Dean for Faculty at Weill Cornell Medicine and a Professor of Clinical Radiology. McGinty is an expert in healthcare economics and payment policy, and is known for her advocacy for patient-centered care and diversity in medical leadership.

In 2018, McGinty became the first woman to serve as chair of the American College of Radiology (ACR), and in 2020 became the 97th President of the ACR. In 2024, she received the ACR Gold Medal, becoming the 15th woman in over 100 years of ACR history to receive the award.

== Early life and education ==
McGinty attended the National University of Ireland, Galway, where she received her medical degree (MB, BCh, BAO) with Honors in 1988. Following medical school, she completed a rotational internship year in Medicine and Surgery at University College Hospital, Galway, Ireland (1988-1989).

McGinty completed her residency training in Diagnostic Radiology at the University of Pittsburgh Medical Center from 1989 to 1993, serving as Chief Radiology Resident during 1992-1993. She then completed a fellowship in Women's Imaging at Massachusetts General Hospital in Boston (1993-1994), where she also held the title of Clinical Instructor at Harvard Medical School.

In 2000, McGinty earned her Master of Business Administration (MBA) from Columbia University.

== Career ==
After completing her training, McGinty held several academic and clinical positions:

- Assistant Professor of Radiology and Assistant Attending Radiologist at New York Medical College and Westchester Medical Center (1994-1995)
- Medical Director of Outpatient Imaging at Montefiore Medical Center and Assistant Professor of Radiology at Albert Einstein College of Medicine (1995-2002)
- Physician and shareholder at NRAD Medical Associates, Garden City, NY (2002-2013), serving as Managing Partner from 2010-2012

In March 2014, McGinty joined the faculty at Weill Cornell Medical College as Assistant Professor of Radiology. She has since risen through the ranks to become Professor of Clinical Radiology and Professor of Clinical Population Health Sciences.

In 2021, she was appointed Senior Associate Dean for Clinical Affairs. In 2024, McGinty was promoted to Senior Associate Dean for Faculty.

McGinty has held leadership positions within the American College of Radiology:

- Member of the Board of Chancellors (2012-2021)
- Chair of the Commission on Economics (2012-2016)
- First woman Chair of the ACR (May 2018)
- 97th President of the ACR (2020)

=== Imaging 3.0 ===
As a steering group member of Imaging 3.0, launched in 2013, McGinty led efforts to support radiologists in the transition from "volume to value" healthcare delivery.

=== RadXX (Rad=) ===
In 2016, McGinty co-founded RadXX (later renamed Rad=), an inclusive community-building initiative aimed at increasing the participation of women in radiology and imaging informatics.

=== Radiology Health Equity Coalition ===
As ACR President in May 2021, McGinty launched the Radiology Health Equity Coalition, a radiology-wide coalition to reduce disparities in access to imaging care and improve outcomes. The coalition includes major organizations such as the American Board of Radiology, Radiological Society of North America, Society of Interventional Radiology, and the American Medical Association Section Council on Radiology, among others.

== Research and scholarship ==
McGinty's research interests include:

- Healthcare payment policy and new payment models, particularly their implications for radiology
- Impact of policy changes such as the Medicare multiple procedure payment reduction
- Connection between compliance with breast screening guidelines and patient cost-sharing trends
- Potential for bundled payments to improve quality and compliance in screening
- Mentorship culture and diversity in healthcare leadership
- Role of social media in healthcare advocacy and community building

She conducted a qualitative study of shared values among leaders at Weill Cornell Medicine, NewYork-Presbyterian, and Cornell University to inform curriculum development for a Healthcare Leadership course in the WCM Masters program.

McGinty is an Editorial Board Member for the Journal of the American College of Radiology (2011-2021).

== Mentorship ==
She has established mentorship programs throughout her career, beginning as Chief Resident at the University of Pittsburgh where she started a program to assist first-year residents. She is particularly committed to mentoring women to develop their leadership skills, noting the disparity between women comprising the majority of the healthcare workforce yet being underrepresented in top leadership positions. In 2019, McGinty endowed a scholarship at the University of Galway to support female physicians pursuing MBAs. According to Dr. Connie Lu, chief resident at NewYork-Presbyterian/Weill Cornell: "Many of the people I have met along the way told me how Dr. McGinty was a mentor to them as well. It's hard to find the words to encompass how truly amazing a mentor Dr. McGinty is and how many people she has positively impacted."

== Awards and honors ==
- 2024: American College of Radiology Gold Medal - 15th woman in over 100 years to receive this award
- 2013: Fellow of the American College of Radiology (FACR)

== Selected publications ==
=== Columns and articles ===
- "A Metrics Moonshot" New England Journal Catalyst (2016)
- "How to fight imposter syndrome in the time of corona virus" Harvard Business Review Ascend (2020, with Dr. Ruth Gotian)
- "U.S. Radiology Responds to the Pandemic and Looks Ahead" Health Management (2020)
- "Managing Diversity - Pathways to a More Inclusive Future" Health Management (2021)
- "Health Inequity in Radiology and Solutions for a More Equitable Future" Health Management (2021)
- "Integrative Diagnostics: A Vision for Better Care" Health Management (2023)

=== Book chapter ===
- Mema, E & McGinty, G. (2020). "The Role of Artificial Intelligence in Understanding and Addressing Disparities in Breast Cancer Outcomes." Current Breast Cancer Reports. 12:1-7. doi:10.1007/s12609-020-00368-x

McGinty maintains a personal blog at www.drgeraldinemcginty.com and contributed monthly columns on Economics and Health Policy to the American College of Radiology's "ACR Bulletin" from 2010-2016.
