= Peter Cattaneo =

British filmmaker (born 1964)

Peter Cattaneo MBE
- Born: Peter Joseph Cattaneo; 1 July 1964 (age 62); Twickenham, London, England
- Occupations: Film director; television director; producer; screenwriter
- Years active: 1989–present
- Known for: Director of The Full Monty
- Spouse: Julia Cattaneo
- Children: 4
- Awards: MTV Movie Award for Best New Filmmaker; The Full Monty (1997)

Peter Joseph Cattaneo MBE (born 1 July 1964) is a British filmmaker. He is best known for directing the comedy film The Full Monty, for which he won the MTV Movie Award for Best New Filmmaker and was nominated for the Academy Award for Best Director.

== Life and career ==
Cattaneo was brought up in Twickenham, London. His father was a London-born animator of Italian descent. After attending London College of Printing for an art foundation course, and Leeds Polytechnic for a BA in Graphic Design (Film), he graduated from the Royal College of Art in 1989, he was nominated for the Academy Award for Best Live Action Short Film for Dear Rosie (1990). He went on to make his feature film debut with The Full Monty (1997), which was a smash success both in the UK and internationally. The comedy grossed £160,049,344 at the box office on a £3 million budget and Cattaneo received a nomination for the Academy Award for Best Director.

Cattaneo has since directed several films, including Lucky Break (2001), Opal Dream (2006) and The Rocker (2008). He has also directed a multitude of commercials, as well as every episode of the award-winning comedy television series Rev. for BBC Two.

He was appointed a Member of the Order of the British Empire (MBE) in the 1998 Birthday Honours "for services to the British Film Industry."

== Filmography ==
Short film

- Dear Rosie (1990)
- Paddy's Rewards Club (2019)
- Cinch (2021)

Feature film

| Year | Title | Director | Producer | Writer |
|---|---|---|---|---|
| 1997 | The Full Monty | Yes | No | No |
| 2001 | Lucky Break | Yes | Yes | No |
| 2006 | Opal Dream | Yes | No | Yes |
| 2008 | The Rocker | Yes | No | No |
| 2019 | Military Wives | Yes | No | No |
| 2024 | The Penguin Lessons | Yes | Executive | No |

TV series

| Year | Title | Director | Executive Producer | Notes |
|---|---|---|---|---|
| 1993 | Teenage Health Freak | Yes | No | 6 episodes |
| 1993–1994 | The Bill | Yes | No | 2 episodes |
| 2010–2012 | Little Crackers | Yes | No | 4 episodes |
| 2010–2014 | Rev. | Yes | No | 19 episodes |
| 2016 | The A Word | Yes | No | 3 episodes |
| 2022 | Magpie Murders | Yes | Yes | 6 episodes |
| 2022 | The Flatshare | Yes | Yes | 3 episodes |

TV movies

- Loved Up (1995)
- Diana and I (2017)

== Accolades ==
Academy Awards

| Year | Title | Category | Result |
|---|---|---|---|
| 1990 | Best Live Action Short Film | Dear Rosie | Nominated |
| 1997 | Best Director | The Full Monty | Nominated |

BAFTA Awards

| Year | Title | Category | Result |
|---|---|---|---|
| 1990 | Best Short Film | Dear Rosie | Nominated |
| 1997 | Best Direction | The Full Monty | Nominated |
