= Oak Flat: A Fight for Sacred Land in the American West =

2020 graphic novel by Lauren Redniss

Oak Flat: A Fight for Sacred Land in the American West is a 2020 graphic novel by Lauren Redniss. It describes a conflict between the San Carlos Apache tribe and Resolution Copper.

Redniss cited corporate and legal documents, anthropology statements, and other journalistic accounts. Apaches and White Americans generated interviews used for the book.

Lily Meyer, in a review for National Public Radio, stated that due to the scope the book covers, it "feels expansive." Eliza Griswold of The New York Times wrote that the book is "virtuosic".

Heidi MacDonald of Publishers Weekly wrote that the book has "precise, descriptive prose".
