= List of Armenian films of the 1920s =

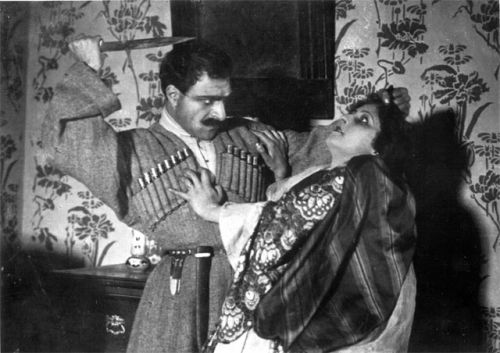
Namus, 1926

This is a list of films released in the 1920s produced in Armenia SSR or directed by Armenians or about Armenia or Armenians, ordered by year of release.

Title	Director	Cast	Genre	Notes
1920
1921
1922
1923
1924
1925
Նամուս; Namus	Hamo Beknazarian	Hovhannes Abelian; Hasmik	Silent film	Based on Alexander Shirvanzade's 1885 novel of the same name. It is widely recognized as the first Armenian feature film.
1926
Shor and Shorshor	Hamo Beknazarian	Hambartsum Khachanyan; Aram Amirbekyan; Nina Manucharyan	Comedy	
Զարե; Zare	Hamo Beknazarian	Maria Tenazi; Hrachia Nersisyan; Avet Avetisyan	Drama	
1927
1928
Խասփուշ; Khaspush	Hamo Beknazarian	Hrachia Nersisyan; M. Dulgaryan; Avet Avetisyan	War drama	
The Slave	A. Yalovoy	Hasmik; B. Madatova; N. Manucharyan	Drama	
Evil Spirit	Patvakan Barkhudaryan; Mikheil Gelovani	Hasmik; Nina Manucharyan; Mikheil Gelovani	Drama	
Five Hitting the Mark (Step by Step)	Patvakan Barkhudaryan	L. Sahakyan; H. Mravyan; S. Kocharyan	Crime, Drama	
1929
House on the Volcano	Hamo Beknazarian	Hrachia Nersisyan; T. Ayvazyan; T. Makhmuryan	Drama	
The Sixtheenth (The Sixteenth?)	Patvakan Barkhudaryan	A. Gorelov; T. Vishnevskaya; N. Volkhovskoy	Drama, Propaganda	
Spring in Collective Farm	Amasi Martirosyan	Avet Avetisyan; M. Garagash; Aram Amirbekyan	Drama, Propaganda	A short.
Who Is to Blame?	K. Arzumanyan	S. Mkrtchyan; Amasi Martirosyan; K. Arzumanyan	Drama, Propaganda	A short.

== See also ==
- List of Soviet films
