= List of Armenian films of the 1930s =

This is a list of films released in the 1930s produced in Armenia SSR or directed by Armenians or about Armenia or Armenians, ordered by year of release.

== List ==
Title	Director	Cast	Genre	Notes
1930
Zamallu (Shahali Bridge)	I. Perestiani	V. Vardanyan; O. Maysuryan; A. Harutyunyan	War, Propaganda	
Under the Black Wing (Signal at the Waterfall)	Patvakan Barkhudaryan	Hasmik; M. Garagash; A. Amiragyan	Propaganda, Drama	
First Rays	A. Danielyan	Ye. Kafieva; S. Astvatsatryan; A. Jalalyan		
Kim on Duty	Amasi Martirosyan	A. Gamkrelidze; Avet Avetisyan; S. Aghamalyan		A short.
1931
The Thief	K. Rodendorf	S. Edigarov; H. Stepanyan; Hrachia Nersisyan	Drama	
Կիկոս; Kikos	Patvakan Barkhudaryan	Hambartsum Khachanyan; Hrachia Nersisyan; Avet Avetisyan	Comedy; War	
1932
Happening in St. Louis	M. Verner	I. Kozlov; M. Chmshkyan; S. Mkrtchyan	Propaganda	
The Lazybones	I. Perestiani	H. Khachanyan; N. Manucharyan; Kh. Abrahamyan	Propaganda	
Mexican Diplomats	Amasi Martirosyan; Levon Kalantar	H. Khachanyan; Aram Amirbekyan; Hrachia Nersisyan		
1933
Kurds-Yezidis	Amasi Martirosyan	Hrachia Nersisyan; Hasmik; Avet Avetisyan	Propaganda	
Two Nights	Patvakan Barkhudaryan	Hrachia Nersisyan; S. Arevsha-tyan; M. Janan	Propaganda	
Harut	P. Armand	N. Manucharyan; G.Sarkisov; S. Mirzoyan; H. Danielyan		A lost film.
Light and Shadows	I. Perestiani	Hrachia Nersisyan; T. Makhmurova; H.Khachanyan	Propaganda	Silent.
Sunchild (Poem on the Cotton)	Patvakan Barkhudaryan; H. Stepanyan; K. Geghamyan; K. Simonyan		Historical	
1934
When the Gardens Bloom	Jerghiz Zhamharyan	H. Stepanyan; M. Garagash; Ye. Harutyunyan		A lost film.
Gikor	Amasi Martirosyan	Hrachia Nersisyan; Avet Avetisyan; Hasmik	Melodrama	
1935
Պեպո; Pepo	Hamo Beknazarian; Armen Gulakyan	Hrachia Nersisyan; Avet Avetisyan; Hasmik; Grigor Avetyan	Drama	Pepo is the first Armenian language sound film ever made and is based on Gabriel Sundukyan's 1876 play.
1936
1937
Karo	Artashes Hay-Artyan	Avet Avetisyan; M. Hakobyan; O. Buniatyan	Adventure, War	
Six Shots	G. Marinosyan	Hrachia Nersisyan; David Malyan; V. Mirzoyan		Lost Film
1938
Զանգեզուր; Zangezur	Hamo Beknazarian; Y. Dukor	Hrachia Nersisyan; Avet Avetisyan; Hasmik	War, Propaganda	About Dashnak opposition to the incursion of the Red Army and the local Bolshevik partisans in the Armenian province of Zangezur at the time of Sovietization.
The Fishermen of Sevan	G. Marinosyan; N. Dukor	Hrachia Nersisyan; Hasmik; O. Buniatyan	Propaganda	
1939
Mountainous March	Stepan Kevorkov; E. Karamyan	V. Vagharshyan; Avet Avetisyan; G. Avetyan	Propaganda	

== See also ==
- List of Soviet films
