= List of Armenian films of the 1940s =

This is a list of films released in the 1940s produced in Armenia SSR or directed by Armenians or about Armenia or Armenians, ordered by year of release.

Title	Director	Cast	Genre	Notes
1940
Mountain Stream or Mountain Flood (Inviolable Friendship)	Patvakan Barkhudaryan	V. Vagharshyan; H. Avagyan; T. Saryan		
Nazar the Brave	Amasi Martirosyan	Hambartsum Khachanyan; Arus Asryan; Avet Avetisyan	Comedy	
People of Our Collective Farm	Artashes Hay-Artyan	Hasmik; T. Saryan; V. Mirzoyan		
1941
Eye for an Eye	G. Gabrielyan; A. Samvelyan	Hrachia Nersisyan; A. Ter-Abrahamyan; K. Simonya	World War II	A short.
The Family of Patriots	E. Karamyan; T. Saryan	Avet Avetisyan; David Malyan; Hasmik	World War II	A short.
Fire in the Forest	Amasi Martirosyan; Levon Isahakyan	I. Boguslavsky; I. Sergeyev	World War II	A short.
Lesson of Soviet Language	Amasi Martirosyan; Levon Isahakyan	I. Boguslavsky; I. Sergeyev	World War II	A short.
1942
Daughter	Hamo Beknazarian	Hrachia Nersisyan; S. Volkhovskaya; Avet Avetisyan		A short.
1943
The Guardsman's Wife	Patvakan Barkhudaryan	V. Vagharshyan; N. Alisova; Ye. Samoylov		
1944
Դավիթ Բեկ; David Bek	Hamo Beknazarian	Hrachia Nersisyan; Avet Avetisyan; Hasmik	Adventure, biography and drama	
Once in the Night (Bride)	B. Barnet	B. Andreev; I. Kuznetsov; N. Dupak	World War II	
1945
1946
1947
Անահիտ; Anahit	Hamo Beknazarian	Hrachia Nersisyan; Avet Avetisyan; O. Buniatyan	Adventure	
1948
1949

== See also ==
- List of Soviet films
