= List of Soviet films of 1928 =

A list of films produced in the Soviet Union in 1928 (see 1928 in film).

== 1928 ==
Title	Original title	Director	Cast	Genre	Notes
1928
Bulat-Batır	Була́т-Баты́р	Yuri Tarich	Galina Kravchenko	Action drama	Only Tatar full length silent film
A Cup of Tea	Чашка чая	Nikolai Shpikovsky	Igor Ilyinsky, Nina Li, Ivan Lagutin	Comedy	
The Doll with Millions	Кукла с миллионами	Sergei Komarov	Igor Ilyinsky, Vladimir Fogel, Galina Kravchenko	Comedy	
Don Diego and Pelagia	Дон Диего и Пелагея	Yakov Protazanov	Mariya Blyumental-Tamarina	Comedy, drama	
Eliso	Элисо	Nikoloz Shengelaia	Aleksandre Imedashvili	Adventure	
Evil Spirit	Злой дух	Patvakan Barkhudaryan, Mikheil Gelovani	Hasmik, Nina Manucharyan, Mikheil Gelovani	Drama	
Five Right in the Target	Пять в яблочко	Patvakan Barkhudaryan	L. Sahakyan, H. Mravyan, Suren Kocharyan	Drama	
Golden Beak	Золотой клюв	Yevgeni Chervyakov	A. Yefimov	Drama	
Heroic Deed Among the Ice	Подвиг во льдах	Georgi Vasilyev and Sergei Vasilyev		Documentary	Partially lost
His Excellency	Его превосходительство	Grigori Roshal	Leonid Leonidov, Maria Sinelnikova, Tamara Adelheim, Nikolai Cherkasov, Mikhail Rostovtsev	Drama	
The House in the Snow-Drifts	Дом в сугробах	Fridrikh Ermler	Fyodor Nikitin, Tatyana Okova, Valeri Solovtsov	Drama	
The House on Trubnaya	Дом на Трубной	Boris Barnet	Vera Maretskaya, Vladimir Fogel	Comedy	
Kastus Kalinovskiy	Кастусь Калиновский	Vladimir Gardin		Biopic	
Khaspush	Хас-пуш	Hamo Beknazarian	Hrachia Nersisyan, M. Dulgaryan, Avet Avetisyan	War film	
Krazana	Овод	Kote Marjanishvili	Nato Vachnadze	Drama, Adventure	
Krivoi Rog	Кривой Рог	Aleksandr Gavronsky	Ivan Chuvelev, Dmitri Vasiliev, Ivan Shtrauh, Evgeny Tokmakov	Comedy, drama	Lost film
Lace	Кружева	Sergei Yutkevich	Nina Shaternikova	Comedy	
Durkh trern Through Tears	Durkh trern	Grigory Gricher	J. K. Kovenberg, A. D. Goritcheva, D. A. Cantor, M. D. Sen-Elnikova, S. J. Silberman, A. J. Vubnik and F. A. Soslovsky	Comedy, drama	Original lost
Lev Tolstoy and the Russia of Nicholas II	Россия Николая Второго и Лев Толстой	Esfir Shub		Documentary	
Mutiny	Мятеж	Semyon Tymoshenko	Pyotr Podvalny	War drama	
My Son	Мой сын	Yevgeni Chervyakov	Gennadiy Michurin, Anna Sten, Pyotr Berezov	Drama	
The Night Coachman	Ночной извозчик	Georgi Tasin	Amvrosi Buchma, Maria Dyusimeter, Nikolai Nademsky	Drama	
October: Ten Days That Shook the World	Октябрь: Десять дней, которые потрясли мир	Grigori Aleksandrov, Sergei Eisenstein	Vladimir Popov	History, drama	
Oktyabryukhov and Dekabryukhov	Октябрюхов и Декабрюхов	O. Iskander, Aleksei Smirnov	Georgi Astafyev, Leonid Barbe, Afanasi Belov	Comedy	
The Parisian Cobbler	Парижский сапожник	Fridrikh Ermler	Veronika Buzhinskaya	Drama	
Penal Servitude	Каторга	Yuli Raizman	Andrei Zhilinsky	Drama	
A Nenets Boy	Самоедский мальчик	Valentina Brumberg, Zinaida Brumberg, Nikolai Khodataev, Olga Khodatayeva		Animation, short	
Vania the Pioneer	Пионер Ваня	Victor Grigoryev		Animation	Lost film
Potholes	Ухабы	Abram Room	Sergei Minin, Evlaliya Olgina	Drama	
Rasputin	Распутин	Nikolai Larin, Boris Nevolin	Vladimir Gajdarov, Suzanne Delmas, Ernst Rückert	Drama	Soviet-German co-production
The Rink	Каток	Yuri Zhelyabuzhsky		Animation, short	
Salamander	Саламандра	Grigori Roshal	Bernhard Goetzke, Natalya Rozenel, Nikolay Khmelyov, Sergey Komarov	Drama	Soviet-German co-production
Snow Boys		Boris Shpis		Comedy	
The Shanghai Document	Шанхайский документ	Yakov Bliokh		Documentary	
Storm Over Asia	Потомок Чингисхана	Vsevolod Pudovkin	Valéry Inkijinoff	Drama	
A Tangled Web	Провокатор	Victor A. Turin	Leonid Danilov, Vladimir Krueger, Nikolay Kutuzov	Drama	
A Town Full of Light	Светлый город	Ivan Pravov, Olga Preobrazhenskaya	Raisa Puzhnaya, Vasiliy Gndeochkin, Emma Tsesarskaya, Elena Maksimova		
Tip-Top in Moscow	Тип-Топ в Москве	Aleksandr Vasilyevich Ivanov		Animation	Lost film
Vanka and the 'Avenger'	Ванька и «Мститель»	Aksel Lundin	Anton Klimenko, Volodya Nolman, Andrey Petrovsky	Adventure	
The White Eagle	Белый орёл	Yakov Protazanov	Vasili Kachalov, Anna Sten, Vsevolod Meyerhold	Drama	
The Yellow Ticket	Земля в плену	Fedor Ozep	Anna Sten, Ivan Koval-Samborsky, Mikhail Narokov, Vladimir Fogel	Drama	
Zvenigora	Звeнигopа	Alexander Dovzhenko	Semyon Svashenko	Fantasy	Ukraine SSR

== See also ==
- 1928 in the Soviet Union
