= List of Soviet films of 1944 =

A list of films produced in the Soviet Union in 1944 (see 1944 in film).

== 1944 ==
| Title | Original title | Director | Cast | Genre | Notes |
|---|---|---|---|---|---|
1944
| David Bek | Давид-Бек | Hamo Beknazarian | Hrachia Nersisyan, Avet Avetisyan, Hasmik | Biopic | |
| Days and Nights | Дни и ночи | Aleksandr Stolper | Vladimir Solovyov | Drama | |
| Duel | Поединок | Vladimir Legoshin | Sergei Lukyanov | Crime drama | |
| Ivan Nikulin: Russian Sailor | Иван Никулин - русский матрос | Igor Savchenko | Ivan Pereverzev | Drama | |
| The Last Hill | Малахов курган | Iosif Kheifits, Aleksandr Zarkhi | Nikolay Kryuchkov | Drama | |
| Nebo Moskvy | Небо Москвы | Yuli Raizman | Pyotr Aleynikov | Drama | |
| Once There Was a Girl | Жила-была девочка | Viktor Eisymont | Nina Ivanova | Drama | |
| Rainbow | Радуга | Mark Donskoy | Nina Alisova, Natalya Uzhviy, Vera Ivashova | War film | |
| Silva | Сильва | Aleksandr Ivanovsky | Zoya Smirnova-Nemirovich, Sergei Martinson | Operetta film | |
| At 6 P.M. After the War | В шесть часов вечера после войны | Ivan Pyryev | Marina Ladynina, Ivan Lyubeznov, Yevgeny Samoylov | Drama | |
| The Ural Front | Большая земля | Sergey Gerasimov | Tamara Makarova, Viktor Dobrovolsky, Sofya Khalyutina | War film | |
| The Wedding | Свадьба | Isidor Annensky | Erast Garin, Zoya Fyodorova, Alexey Gribov, Faina Ranevskaya, Sergey Martinson | Comedy | |
| We from the Urals | Мы с Урала | Lev Kuleshov, Aleksandra Khokhlova | Aleksei Konsovsky, Yanina Zhejmo, Sergei Filippov, Aleksandr Mikhajlov, Georgy Millyar | Drama | |
| Zoya | Зоя | Lev Arnshtam | Galina Vodyanitskaya | Biopic | |

== See also ==
- 1944 in the Soviet Union
