= List of Soviet films of 1938 =

A list of films produced in the Soviet Union in 1938 (see 1938 in film).

== 1938 ==
Title	Russian title	Director	Cast	Genre	Notes
1938
Alexander Nevsky	Александр Невский	Sergei Eisenstein		Biopic	
The Bear	Медведь	Isidor Annensky	Olga Androvskaya	Drama	
The Childhood of Maxim Gorky	Детство Горького	Mark Donskoy	Aleksei Lyarsky	Historical	
Doctor Aybolit	Доктор Айболит	Vladimir Nemolyayev	Maksim Shtraukh		
Friends	Друзья	Lev Arnshtam, Viktor Eisymont	Boris Babochkin	Biopic	
The Great Citizen	Великий гражданин	Fridrikh Ermler	Nikolay Bogolyubov	Biopic	
The Great Dawn	Великое зарево	Mikheil Chiaureli		Drama, history, biopic	
If War Comes Tomorrow	Если завтра война...	Lazar Antsi-Polovsky, Georgy Beryozko, Yefim Dzigan, Nikolai Karmazinsky	Inna Fyodorova	Drama	
Komsomolsk	Комсомольск	Sergei Gerasimov	Pyotr Aleynikov, Sergei Gerasimov	Drama	
The Man with the Gun	Человек с ружьём	Sergei Yutkevich	Maksim Shtraukh	Drama	
Men of the Sea	Балтийцы	Aleksandr Faintsimmer	P. Gofman, Galina Inyutina, Pyotr Kirillov	War film	
The New Moscow	Новая Москва	Aleksandr Medvedkin, Aleksandr Olenin	Daniil Sagal	Comedy	
Peat-Bog Soldiers	Болотные солдаты	Aleksandr Macheret	Oleg Zhakov	Drama	
Professor Mamlock	Профессор Мамлок	Gerbert Rappaport	Semyon Mezhinsky	Drama	
Treasure Island	Остров сокровищ	Vladimir Vajnshtok, David Bradley	Osip Abdulov, Mikhail Klimov, Nikolai Cherkasov	Adventure	
Victory	Победа	Vsevolod Pudovkin	Yekaterina Korchagina-Aleksandrovskaya	Drama	
Volga-Volga	Волга-Волга	Grigori Aleksandrov	Lyubov Orlova, Igor Ilyinsky	Comedy	awarded Stalin Prize in 1941
Wish upon a Pike	По щучьему веленью	Aleksandr Rou	Pyotr Savin, Georgy Millyar, Maria Kravchunovskaya	Fantasy	
Zangezur	Зангезур	Hamo Beknazarian	Hrachia Nersisyan, Avet Avetisyan, Hasmik	War drama	awarded Stalin Prize in 1941

== See also ==
- 1938 in the Soviet Union
