= List of Soviet films of 1935 =

A list of films produced in the Soviet Union in 1935 (see 1935 in film).

== 1935 ==
Title	Original title	Director	Cast	Genre	Notes
1935
Aerograd	Аэроград	Aleksandr Dovzhenko	Stepan Shagaida, Sergei Stolyarov	Adventure	
Bezhin Meadow	Бежин луг	Sergei Eisenstein	Viktor Kartashov	Drama	
Dzhulbars	Джульбарс	Vladimir Schneiderov	Nikolay Cherkasov-Sergeyev	Action	
Engineer Goff	Инженер Гофф	Boris Shpis, Rashel Milman			
Happiness	Счастье	Aleksandr Medvedkin	Pyotr Zinovyev	Comedy	
Lyotchiki	Лётчики	Yuli Raizman, Grigori Levkoyev	Ivan Koval-Samborsky	Drama	
Red Army Days	Горячие денечки	Alexander Zarkhi, Iosif Kheifits	Nikolay Simonov, Tatiana Okunevskaya, Nikolay Cherkasov, Janina Żejmo, Alexey Gribov	Comedy	
The Last Port	Последнии порта	Arnold Kordyum	Pyotr Masokha, Sergei Minin, Ladislav Golichenko	Drama	
Loss of Sensation	Гибель сенсации	Alexandr Andriyevsky		Science fiction	
The New Gulliver	Новый Гулливер	Aleksandr Ptushko		Animation	
Paths of Enemy	Вражьи тропы	Ivan Pravov and Olga Preobrazhenskaya			
Pepo	Պեպո	Hamo Beknazarian, Armen Gulakyan	Hrachia Nersisyan, Avet Avetisyan, Hasmik, Grigor Avetyan	Drama	Armenian SSR
The Youth of Maxim	Юность Максима	Grigori Kozintsev and Leonid Trauberg	Boris Chirkov	Historical drama	
Three Comrades	Три товарища	Semyon Timoshenko	Mikhail Zharov	Drama	

== See also ==
- 1935 in the Soviet Union
