= Armenfilm =

Armenian film studio

- Type: Public (1923–2005; 2015–present); Private (2005–2015)
- Industry: Film
- Founded: 16 April 1923; 103 years ago
- Founders: Hamo Beknazarian; Daniel Dznuni
- Headquarters: Yerevan, Armenia,
- Owner: Government of Armenia

Armenfilm (Russian: Арменфильм; Armenian: Արմենֆիլմ), also known as Hayfilm (Armenian: Հայֆիլմ), is an Armenian film studio company located in Yerevan. The studio company was founded on 16 April 1923 as a production unit of the Soviet State Cinema Organization, with Daniel Dznuni as the first director. It is one of the oldest film studios in Armenia.

Armenfilm was sold by the state to private investors in 2005 with a long list of conditions to revitalize the studio's equipment and produce new content. It was renamed as CS Film Studios but failed to produce the required new feature films. In 2015, the Government of Armenia decided that the new management had failed to satisfy the conditions of the sale and moved to reclaim the studio's assets.

== History ==
- 1923 - The organization "Goskino" was created within the People's Commissariat of Education of Armenia, as well as the association "Gosfotokino".
- 1928 - The studio was renamed as "Armenkino".
- 1938 - The studio was renamed as "Yerevan Film Studio".
- 1957 - The studio was renamed as "Armenfilm".
- 1959 - The newsreel and television sector was reallocated to the independent Yerevan Studio of Documentary Films.
- 1966 - The studio was named after Hamo Beknazarian.
- 2005 - The studio was sold to the company "Armenia Studios" (part of the holding CS MEDIA CITY), which in turn was owned by members of the Armenian diaspora in the United States – the Cafesjian and Sarkisian families. The new owner committed to invest $66 million into the studio over 10 years.
- 2015 - The studio was reclaimed by the Government of Armenia.

== Establishment and early growth ==
The Armenian Film Foundation was established in 1923 by the centralized government following Armenia's 1922 entry to the Soviet Union. Armenian cinema prospered until the start of World War II, when production declined. Following Hayfilm's comeback and renewal in the late 1950s, the motion picture industry started to accelerate once more. The Armenian film industry finally expanded to consistently release six to seven feature-length films annually in the 1980s. This happened due to receiving orders from the USSR's Central Television and working with Mosfilm, the biggest and most important studio in the Soviet Union and Europe at the time.

== Production ==
Hayfilm had considerable cinematic success in the 1960s, as it developed the duplicating and recreating of Armenian silent films. Some of the early works from the studio include Namus (1925), Zare (1926), Shor and Shorshor (1926), and Khaspush (1928), all directed by Hamo Beknazarian. In the late 20th century, the Hayfilm studio duplicated 42–45 films annually. Cartoon production began in 1967 and has continued since, with the most prominent animator being Robert Sahakyants. In 1978, the film studio relocated to a newly launched institution, developed film-making techniques, and issued 6-7 films yearly. During the same period, Hayfilm acquired orders from the USSR's Central Television, partnering with the Mosfilm film studio, and in the 1980s, reached accomplishments in the film industry. The "Hayk Documentary Film Studio" was established in 1990 when the Hayfilm documentary film creative association divided and rebuilt the documentary film library.

== Female contributions ==
The animation department of Hayfilm was mainly employed by female artists. The women in this department developed their culture for around ten years and were critical for the next generation. Among them was Lyudmila Sahakyants, whose Congregation of Mice (1978) animated cartoon was a satire of the political and social environment that is still present today.

== Film industry post-independence ==
The Armenian cinema industry suffered considerably during the 1990s energy crisis when film production and consumption required electricity. In the same period, the blockade, the Spitak earthquake, and the First Nagorno-Karabakh War caused theaters to close, filmmakers to leave, and local cinematography fell into a period of decline. State-run film production projects gradually became privately owned and controlled. The widespread privatization aligned with the first diaspora investments into the industry which led to a resurgence in the Armenian film industry.

== Selected films ==
- Namus (1925) – directed by Hamo Beknazarian
- Zare (1926) – directed by Hamo Beknazarian
- Shor and Shorshor (1926) – directed by Hamo Beknazarian
- Khaspush (1928) – directed by Hamo Beknazarian
- Evil Spirit (1928) – directed by Patvakan Barkhudaryan and Mikheil Gelovani
- Kikos (1931) - directed by Patvakan Barkhudaryan
- Gikor (1934) - directed by Amasi Martirosyan
- Pepo (1935) – directed by Hamo Beknazarian
- Karo (1937) – directed by Artashes Hay-Artyan and S. Taits
- Zangezur (1938) – directed by Hamo Beknazarian and Yakov Dukor
- Nazar the Brave (1940) – directed by Amasi Martirosyan
- David Bek (1944) – directed by Hamo Beknazarian
- Dark Is the Night (1945) – directed by Boris Barnet
- Anahit (1947) – directed by Hamo Beknazarian
- The Song of First Love (1958) – directed by Yuri Yerznkyan and Laert Vagharshyan
- Guys from the Army Band (1960) – directed by Henrik Malyan and Henrik Margaryan
- Road to the Stage (1963) – directed by Henrik Malyan and Levon Isahakyan
- Hello, That's Me! (1966) – directed by Frunze Dovlatyan
- The Color of Pomegranates (1969) – directed by Sergei Parajanov
- We and Our Mountains (1969) – directed by Henrik Malyan
- My Heart Is in the Highlands (1975) – directed by Levon Grigoryan
- Seasons of the Year (1975) – short film, directed by Artavazd Peleshyan
- Delivery (1976) – directed by Frunze Dovlatyan
- Nahapet (1977) – directed by Henrik Malyan
- The Mulberry Tree (1979) – directed by Gennadi Melkonian
- Oh, Gevorg (1979) – directed by Sargis Petrosyan
- Kikos (1979) – animation, directed by Robert Sahakyants
- A Piece of Sky (1980) – directed by Henrik Malyan
- Gikor (1982) – directed by Sergey Israelyan
- The Tango of Our Childhood (1984) – directed by Albert Mkrtchyan
- The Lesson (1987) – animation, directed by Robert Sahakyants
- The 13th Apostle (1988) – directed by Suren Babayan
- Yearning (1990) – directed by Frunze Dovlatyan

== See also ==
- Armenian National Cinematheque
- Cinema of Armenia
