= Karo (1937 film) =

- Directed by: Artashes Hay-Artyan; S. Taits
- Written by: Arkasi Kajdar (novel); Artashes Hay-Artyan; S. Taits
- Starring: Avet Avetisyan; Moko Hakobyan; Ori Buniatyan
- Cinematography: O. Fradkin
- Music by: Sargis Barkhudaryan
- Production company: Armenkino
- Release date: November 1, 1937 (Soviet Union)
- Running time: 80 min
- Country: Soviet Union
- Language: Armenian

Karo (Armenian: Կարո) is a 1937 adventure-war film directed by Artashes Hay-Artyan and S. Taits and starring Avet Avetisyan, Moko Hakobyan and Ori Buniatyan

== Cast ==
- Moko Hakobyan - Karo
- Gurgen Gabrielyan - Tatul
- Murad Kostanyan - Hambo
- Amasi Martirosyan - gypsy boy
- Gurgen Janibekyan - Amiryan
- Avet Avetisyan - Colonel
- Ori Buniatyan - Tchibukh
- V. Badalyan - Davit
- D. Tzaturyan - Ashkhen
- Samvel Mkrtchyan - Officer #1
- Aram Samvelyan - Officer #2
- G. Ohanyan - Cadet
