= Gikor (1934 film) =

- Directed by: Amasi Martirosyan
- Written by: M. Gevorgyan; Amasi Martirosyan
- Starring: Hrachia Nersisyan; Avet Avetisyan; Hasmik
- Cinematography: Garosh Bek-Nazaryan
- Distributed by: Armenfilm
- Release date: December 19, 1934 (Soviet Union)
- Running time: 63 min
- Country: Soviet Union
- Language: Armenian

Gikor (Armenian: Գիքոր) is a 1934 Armenian melodrama film directed by Amasi Martirosyan, starring Hrachia Nersisyan, Avet Avetisyan and Hasmik. The film is based on Hovhannes Tumanyan's poem of the same name.

== Plot ==
The film is set in the 19th century and follows Gikor, a peasant boy expelled from school due to his family's inability to pay tuition. His father, Ambo, takes him to Tbilisi and places him in the service of a wealthy merchant. However, Gikor endures mistreatment and abuse from the merchant's family. During the harsh winter, the boy falls gravely ill. Although Ambo arrives to see his son, Gikor, delirious from his illness, fails to recognize him. After Gikor's funeral, Ambo returns to his village

=== Differences from the original story ===
- The film begins with Gikor's expulsion from school, a scene absent from the source material, which opens with the line "In the peasant Ambo’s hut, there was an uproar." This plot element was drawn from other stories by Hovhannes Tumanyan.
- Several additional scenes depict Gikor's adjustment to urban life, including a three-story house, a tavern owner, a policeman, a toy vendor, and the merchant's shop.

== Cast ==
- Hrachia Nersisyan – Hambo
- Avet Avetisyan – Bazaz Artem
- Hasmik – Dedi
- M. Jrpetyan – Nato
- Tatyana Makhmuryan – Nani
- H. Poghosyan – Gikor
- D. Aghbalyan – Zani
- L. Alaverdyan – Guest
- D. Amiberkyan – Hambal
- Aram Amirbekyan – Bago
- M. Beroyan – Guest
- Tatul Dilakyan – Vaso
- Gurgen Gabrielyan – Flower man
- K. Geghamyan – Peasant
- A. Ghukasyan – Guest
- Arkady Harutyunyan – Dukanchi
- S. Mirzoyan – Peasant
