= Nazar the Brave =

- Directed by: Amasi Martirosyan
- Written by: Derenik Demirchyan (play); Amasi Martirosyan
- Starring: Hambartsum Khachanyan; Arus Asryan; Avet Avetisyan
- Cinematography: Sarkis Gevorkyan
- Music by: Sargis Barkhudaryan
- Production company: Yerevan Film Studio
- Release date: 1940
- Running time: 50 min
- Country: Soviet Union
- Languages: Armenian, Russian

Nazar the Brave (a.k.a. Kaj Nazar) (Armenian: Քաջ Նազար) is a 1940 Soviet comedy film directed by Amasi Martirosyan. The title is a reference to the famous fairy tale of the same name by Hovhannes Tumanyan.

== Plot ==
A comical tale about how the coward Nazar who, as a joke of fate, appears to preside over the throne.

== Cast ==
- Hambartsum Khachanyan - Nazar
- Arus Asryan - Ustian
- Avet Avetisyan - Sako
- Manvel Manvelyan - Butler
- L. Msrlyan - Tamada
- Aram Amirbekyan - Voskan
- Samvel Mkrtchyan - Teacher
- A. Aslanyan - Priest
- Artemy Harutyunyan - Courtier
- Davit Gulazyan - Courtier
- Khachatur Abrahamyan - Courtier
- A. Ter-Abrahamyan - Ishkhan
