= The Song of First Love =

- Առաջին Սիրո Երգը
- Directed by: Yuri Yerznkyan, Laert Vagharshyan
- Written by: Zhirayr Hakobyan, Yakov Volchek
- Starring: Khoren Abrahamyan; Hrachia Nersisyan; Elanora Sudakova
- Cinematography: Artashes Jalalyan
- Music by: Arno Babajanyan, Ghazaros Saryan
- Production company: Hayfilm
- Release date: 4 April 1958
- Running time: 102 minutes
- Country: Soviet Union
- Languages: Armenian, Russian

The Song of First Love (Armenian: Առաջին Սիրո Երգը; Russian: Песня первой любви) is a 1958 Soviet romantic musical film co-directed by Yuri Yerznkyan and Laert Vagharshyan. The film is about a talented singer, spoiled by his success, who almost loses his beloved wife.

The film premiered in Yerevan on 4 April 1958 and in Moscow on 4 August 1958.

The film was Khoren Abrahamyan's first significant role acting in a film. The film was Vagharsh Vagharshian's last film in which he acted.

== Plot ==
A young singer, Arsen Varunts (Khoren Abrahamyan), who knew fame early, cannot cope with its burden. His family breaks up, and so too does his voice. An architect in love with Arsen's wife helps Arsen regain his former glory, faith in his talent and win back his wife's love.

== Cast ==
- Khoren Abrahamyan – Arsen
- Hrachia Nersisyan – Varunts
- Elanora Sudakova – Ruzanna
- Semyon Sokolovsky – Varuzhan
- Vagharsh Vagharshian – Melik-Nubaryan
- Olga Gulazyan – Vartush
- A. Sogomonyan – Onik
- Nikolay Ter-Semyonov – Mamikonyan
- Verdalis Mirijanyan – Parandzem
- Tamara Kimanyan-Lanko – Ophelia
- A. Selimkhanov – Dodik
- Ivan Grigorievich Grigurov – Excavator operator
- T Bahchinyan – Ruzanna and Arsen's son
- Anna Garagash – Girlfriend
- Gurgen Shahnazaryan – Black marketeer
- Amasi Martirosyan – Guard
- Murad Kostanyan – Varunts's neighbour
- Tatul Dilakyan

== Music ==
Arno Babajanyan wrote three songs for the film: "Yerevan's lovely girl", "My Yerevan" and "You are the sun of my life". The songs were recorded in May 1957 in Moscow, with an orchestra conducted by Babajanyan, and sung by Sergey Davidyan. It is considered the first Soviet post-war film in which jazz sounded. The screening of the film led Babjanyan's journey to fame.

== Reception ==
The Song of First Love became the top box office film in the Soviet Union in 1958, watched by 24.6 million viewers. The positive reception of the film was so great that special showings were organised at the newly constructed Luzhniki Stadium in Moscow.
