= Kikos (1931 film) =

1931 film

- Directed by: Patvakan Barkhudaryan
- Written by: Patvakan Barkhudaryan
- Story by: M. Darbinyan (story)
- Starring: Hambartsum Khachanyan; Hrachia Nersisyan; Avet Avetisyan
- Cinematography: Aleksandr Stanke
- Production company: Armenkino
- Release dates: 3 December 1931 (Tiflis); 6 January 1932 (Moscow)
- Running time: 53 min
- Country: Soviet Union
- Language: Silent

Kikos (Armenian: Կիկոս) is a 1931 Soviet Armenian comedy-war film, directed by Patvakan Barkhudaryan and starring Hambartsum Khachanyan, Hrachia Nersisyan and Avet Avetisyan.

== Plot ==
Kikos, a naïve and politically uneducated Armenian peasant, finds himself alternately switching sides between opposing factions during the Russian Civil War. Ultimately, he chooses to join the Red Army (RKKA), which fights for the rights of the working people.

== Cast ==
- Hambartsum Khachanyan
- Hrachia Nersisyan
- Avet Avetisyan
- Kh. Abrahamyan
- A. Ashimova
- M. Garagash
- V. Ilyin
- Vasili Ilyin
- Suren Kocharyan
- K. Kogamov
- Amasi Martirosyan
- A. Papyan
