= The House on the Volcano =

1929 film

- Russian: Дом на вулкане
- Directed by: Amo Bek-Nazaryan
- Written by: Amo Bek-Nazaryan; P. Folyan
- Starring: Hrachia Nersisyan; T. Ayvazyan; Tatyana Makhmuryan; V. Manukhina
- Cinematography: Aleksandr Galperin
- Release date: 1929
- Country: Soviet Union

The House on the Volcano (Russian: Дом на вулкане) is a 1929 Soviet film directed by Amo Bek-Nazaryan.

== Plot ==
The film tells about the drill master Petros, who tells the story of the oil workers' strike to his adopted son.

== Cast ==
- Hrachia Nersisyan as Petros
- T. Ayvazyan as Ghukassov
- Tatyana Makhmuryan as Maro (as Tanya Makhmurova)
- V. Manukhina as Sona
- M. Garagash as Governor
- Dimitri Kipiani as Georgi
- Pavel Yesikovsky as Russian worker (as P. Yesikovsky)
- Alasgar Alakbarov
