= Evil Spirit (disambiguation) =

An evil spirit is a malevolent supernatural being.

Evil Spirit or Evil Spirits may also refer to:

- Evil Spirit (film), a 1928 Soviet drama film
- Evil Spirits (album), by the Damned, 2018
- Evil Spirits (film), a 1990 American horror film
