= Evil Spirit (film) =

1928 film

- Directed by: Patvakan Barkhudaryan Mikheil Gelovani
- Written by: Amo Bek-Nazaryan
- Story by: Alexander Shirvanzade (story)
- Starring: Hambartsum Khachanyan; Hrachia Nersisyan; Avet Avetisyan
- Cinematography: N. Anoschenko Arkadi Yalovoy
- Distributed by: Armenkino
- Release date: 25 November 1928
- Running time: 62 min
- Countries: Soviet Union; Soviet Armenia
- Language: Silent

Evil Spirit (Armenian: Չար ոգի) is a 1928 Soviet drama film, directed by Patvakan Barkhudaryan and Mikheil Gelovani and starring Hasmik, Nina Manucharyan and Mikheil Gelovani

The film tells the tragic story about a girl who has epilepsy and is a victim of the superstitions of her husband's family.

== Cast ==
- Hasmik as Shushan
- Nina Manucharyan as Zarnishan
- Mikheil Gelovani as Crazy Danel
- B. Madatova as Sona
- Hambartsum Khachanyan as Servant
- M. Garagash as Merchant
- Samvel Mkrtchyan as Murad
- A. Mamikonyan as Voskan
- A. Papyan as Javahir
- A. Abrahamyan
- S. Epitashvili
