= Zare (film) =

1926 film

- Directed by: Hamo Beknazarian
- Written by: Hamo Beknazarian
- Starring: Maria Tenazi; Hrachia Nersisyan; Avet Avetisyan
- Cinematography: Garosh Bek-Nazaryan; Arkadi Yalovoy
- Production company: Armenkino
- Release dates: 9 November 1926 (Yerevan, Armenia)
- Running time: 69 min.
- Country: Soviet Union
- Language: Silent

Zare (Russian: Зарэ, Armenian: Զարե, Kurdish: Zarê) is a 1926 Soviet Armenian drama film, written and directed by Hamo Beknazarian. Zare is the first Armenian film dedicated to Kurdish culture and was inspired by the text "Zare" written by Hakob Ghazaryan (1864–1926).

== Plot ==
The film depicts the life of the Kurds in the Caucasus and their resistance against imperial Russian authorities. One Kurdish tribe, led by Mejid-agha, has set up camp on the slopes of Mount Ararat and Mount Alagyaz. Under Mejid-agha’s rule, the tribe faces hardship, exacerbated by the oppressive and reckless Timur-bek, who imposes heavy taxes. Timur-bek falls in love with Zare, the fiancée of a shepherd named Saydo. When Zare’s father rejects Timur-bek’s proposal, he vows to eliminate Saydo.

Amidst the turmoil, Kurdish "involunteer" units are being formed under Russian pressure. Saydo, coerced by Timur-bek, joins but later deserts to be with Zare. During a battle with servants of a local lord who attack Zare’s family, Saydo is severely wounded. In his absence, Timur-bek kidnaps Zare. At their wedding, Zare publicly humiliates Timur-bek by slapping him, an act considered intolerable among Kurds. In retaliation, Timur-bek falsely accuses Zare of infidelity at the wedding feast. Ostracized and cursed, Zare finds solace only in Saydo. Together, they abandon their tribe to seek a new life among free people and build a future of happiness.

== Cast ==
- Maria Tenazi as Zare
- Hrachia Nersisyan as Saydo
- Avet Avetisyan as Slo
- Olga Gulazyan as Lyatif Khanum
- Manvel Manvelyan as Msto
- Nina Manucharyan as Nano
- Hambartsum Khachanyan as Khdo
- M. Garagash as Temur-Bek
- Aram Amirbekyan as Clerk
- Sh. Guramashvili as Police-officer
- Amasi Martirosyan as Zurba
- M. Aghamalov as Sheikh
- N. Barres as Head of Uezd
- N. Aghambekyan as Zare's girlfriend
- S. Gevorgyan as Zurba's wife

== See also ==
- Kurdish cinema
