= Namus (film) =

1925 film

- Theatrical release poster
- Directed by: Hamo Beknazarian
- Based on: Namus by Alexander Shirvanzade
- Starring: Hovhannes Abelian; Hasmik
- Cinematography: Sergei Zabozlayev
- Production companies: Armenfilm; Sakhkinmretsvi
- Release dates: 13 April 1926 (Yerevan); 3 October 1926 (Moscow)
- Running time: 62 minutes
- Country: Soviet Union
- Language: Armenian (1960s voiced version)

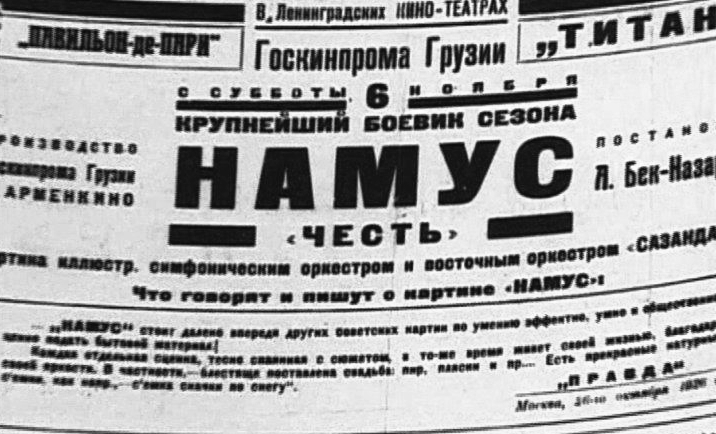
Russian poster of Namus in Leningrad, 1926

Namus (Armenian: Նամուս, meaning "honor") is a 1925 silent drama film by Hamo Beknazarian, based on Alexander Shirvanzade's 1885 novel of the same name, which denounces the despotic rites and customs of Caucasian families. It is widely recognized as the first Armenian feature film.

== History ==
=== Background ===
The Armenfilm studio was founded two years later, on 16 April 1923 as the State Cinema Organisation. Hamo Beknazarian, who was an actor prior to the 1917 Revolution, became actively involved in directing films after the Bolsheviks took over. Namus became his first notable work as a director.

=== Production and reaction ===
Namus was first premiered in Yerevan's Nairi Theatre on 13 April 1926. On 3 October of the same year, the film was presented in Moscow. A poster in Leningrad in 1926 called Namus the "biggest blockbuster of the season". When asked about the film, Hamo Beknazarian said "I wanted to set the power of custom in the pillory, that stupid force of the concept of 'father's honor'". The film had incredible success and brought Beknazarian to fame in the Soviet Union, which helped him in his later works, making him the founder of Armenian cinematography.

=== Restoration ===
The first attempt to restore the film was made in the 1960s, when it was voiced. In 2005 Namus was digitally restored by Franco-German network Arte. This version was first shown in Cinéma Le Balzac in Paris in November 2005 and then in Moscow Cinema in Yerevan in April 2010.

== Plot ==
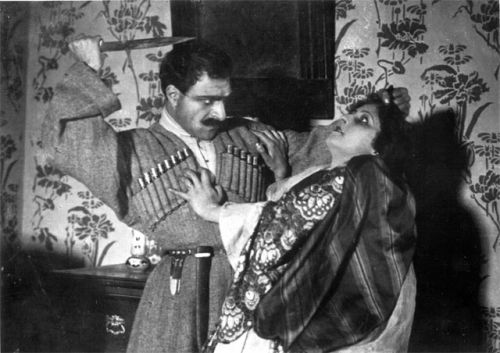
A scene from the film

The story is set in the Caucasian city of Shemakhi, which was a provincial town in pre-revolutionary Russia. The love story involves Seyran, a son of a potter, who secretly meets with Susan, to whom he is engaged. The Armenian customs didn't tolerate this and strictly prohibited such behavior. When a neighbor catches them during one of their secret meetings, rumors of their actions spread around the neighborhood and her family decides to marry her to another man, in order to restore the family's honor. They choose Rustam, a rich merchant, for Susan to marry. Seyran slanders Susan by saying that he owns her. Rustam kills Susan, considered himself disgraced by Seyran's actions. At the end, Seyran commits suicide upon hearing about his lover's death.

== Cast ==
- Hovhannes Abelian as Barkhudar
- Hasmik as Mariam
- Olga Maysurian (hy) as Gyulnaz
- Hrachia Nersisyan as Rustam
- Avet Avetisian (hy, ru) as Hayrapet
- Nina Manucharyan as Shpanik
- Samvel Mkhrtchian (hy) as Seyran
- Maria Shahbutian-Tatieva as Susan
- Hambartsum Khachanyan as Badal
- Levon Aleksanian as Susambar
- Gayane Beknazarian (hy: Գայանե Բեկնազարյան) as Sanam
- Amasi Martirosyan as Smbat
- Mikayel Garagash (hy) as shopkeeper
- Husik Muradian (hy) as dancing child
- Elizaveta Adamian as Mariam's friend
- Tigran Shamirkhanian (hy) as a Zurna blower
- Armen Gulakian (hy) in episodes
- Pahare (hy) as pub owner

== See also ==
- Namus (the concept)
- Cinema of Armenia
