= 1928 in film =

The following is an overview of 1928 in film, including significant events, a list of films released and notable births and deaths. Although some films released in 1928 had sound, most were still silent. This year is notable for the introduction of the official mascot of The Walt Disney Company, Mickey Mouse, in the animated short Steamboat Willie, the first film to include a soundtrack completely created in post production.

== Events ==
- January 6 – The long-awaited Charlie Chaplin comedy The Circus premieres at the Strand Theatre in New York City.
- April 21 – The Passion of Joan of Arc is released.
- July 6 – Lights of New York (starring Helene Costello) is released by Warner Bros. It is the first "100% Talkie" feature film, in that dialog is spoken throughout the film. Previous releases Don Juan and The Jazz Singer had used a synchronized soundtrack with sound effects and music, with The Jazz Singer having a few incidental lines spoken by Al Jolson.
- September 19 – The Singing Fool, Warner Bros' follow-up to The Jazz Singer, is released. While still only a partial-talkie (sequences still feature intertitles), 66 minutes of the film's 105 minute running time feature dialogue or songs, making it the longest talking motion picture yet. (Lights of New York runs a total of 57 minutes.) It is the highest-grossing film of the year, becomes Warner Bros' highest-grossing film for the next 13 years, is the most financially successful film of Al Jolson's career and also remains the highest-grossing sound film until the release of Snow White and the Seven Dwarfs in 1937.
- October 23 – RKO Productions Inc. created
- November 10 – At the beginning of White Shadows in the South Seas, Metro-Goldwyn-Mayer's mascot Leo the Lion roars for the very first time, giving voice to one of the most popular American film logos.
- November 18 – Disney's Steamboat Willie premieres, marking the official introduction of Mickey Mouse. This animated short is the first film to include a soundtrack completely created in post production, including sound effects, music and dialogue.
- December 25 – In Old Arizona, released by Fox Films, is the first sound-on-film feature-length talkie, utilizing the Movietone process. Previously, feature-length talkies used the less-reliable Vitaphone sound-on-disc process. It is also the first Western talkie, and the first sound film primarily shot outdoors.

== Academy Awards ==
- Best Picture: Wings – Paramount Pictures
- Best Unique and Artistic Picture: Sunrise: A Song of Two Humans – Fox Film Corporation
- Best Director, Dramatic Picture: Frank Borzage – 7th Heaven
- Best Director, Comedy Picture: Lewis Milestone – Two Arabian Knights
- Best Actor: Emil Jannings – The Last Command and The Way of All Flesh
- Best Actress: Janet Gaynor – 7th Heaven, Street Angel, and Sunrise: A Song of Two Humans

Note: Prior to 1933, awards were not based on calendar years, which is why there is no 'Best Picture' for a 1928 film.

== Top-grossing films (U.S.) ==
The top ten 1928 released films by box office gross in North America are as follows:

Highest-grossing films of 1928
Rank	Title	Distributor	Domestic rentals
1	The Singing Fool	Warner Bros.	$3,821,000
2	The Circus	United Artists	$1,820,000
3	Street Angel	Fox Film	$1,700,000
4	Lilac Time	Warner Bros.	$1,675,000
5	Four Sons; Ramona	Fox Film; United Artists	$1,500,000
6	Noah's Ark	Warner Bros.	$1,367,000
7	The Red Dance; In Old Arizona	Fox Film	$1,300,000
8	The Terror	Warner Bros.	$1,221,000
9	Lights of New York	Warner Bros.	$1,160,000
10	My Man	Warner Bros.	$1,099,000

== Notable films released in 1928 ==
United States unless stated

=== A ===
- Accident (Polizeibericht Überfall), directed by Ernő Metzner – (Germany)
- Across to Singapore, directed by William Nigh, starring Ramón Novarro, Joan Crawford and Ernest Torrence
- The Actress (lost), directed by Sidney Franklin, starring Norma Shearer
- Adam's Apple, directed by Tim Whelan, starring Monty Banks – (GB)
- Alraune, written and directed by Henrik Galeen, starring Brigitte Helm and Paul Wegener – (Germany)
- Ang Lumang Simbahan (The Old Church), directed by José Nepomuceno, starring Mary Walter – (Philippines)
- The Ape (lost), directed by Beverly C. Rule, starring Gladys Walton
- L'Argent (Money), directed by Marcel L'Herbier, starring Pierre Alcover and Brigitte Helm – (France)
- The Awakening (lost), directed by Victor Fleming, starring Vilma Bánky and Louis Wolheim

=== B ===
- Balaclava, directed by Maurice Elvey and Milton Rosmer, starring Cyril McLaglen and Benita Hume – (GB)
- Beau Sabreur (lost), directed by John Waters, starring Gary Cooper, Evelyn Brent, Noah Beery Sr. and William Powell
- Beggars of Life, directed by William A. Wellman, starring Wallace Beery, Richard Arlen and Louise Brooks
- The Big City (lost), directed by Tod Browning, starring Lon Chaney, Betty Compson and Marceline Day
- The Black Pearl (lost), directed by Scott Pembroke, starring Lila Lee, based on the novel by Mrs. Wilson Woodrow
- The Burning of the Red Lotus Temple (Huo shao hong lian si) (lost), 16-part serial directed by Zhang Shichuan – (China)

=== C ===
- The Cameraman, directed by Edward Sedgwick and Buster Keaton, starring Buster Keaton and Marceline Day
- The Cardboard Lover, directed by Robert Z. Leonard, starring Marion Davies, Jetta Goudal and Nils Asther
- Champagne, directed by Alfred Hitchcock, starring Betty Balfour – (GB)
- The Circus, starring, a Charles Chaplin film
- The Constant Nymph, directed by Adrian Brunel, starring Ivor Novello – (GB)
- The Cossacks, directed by George Hill and Clarence Brown, starring John Gilbert, Renée Adorée and Ernest Torrence
- The Crowd, directed by King Vidor, starring Eleanor Boardman

=== D ===
- Dawn, directed by Herbert Wilcox, starring Sybil Thorndike – (GB)
- The Devious Path (Abwege), directed by G.W. Pabst – (Germany)
- The Divine Woman (lost), directed by Victor Sjöström, starring Greta Garbo and Lars Hanson
- The Docks of New York, directed by Josef von Sternberg, starring George Bancroft, Betty Compson and Olga Baclanova

=== E ===
- Easy Virtue, directed by Alfred Hitchcock, starring Isabel Jeans – (GB)

=== F ===
- The Fall of the House of Usher, directed by James Sibley Watson and Melville Webber, based on the short story by Edgar Allan Poe
- The Fall of the House of Usher (La Chute de la maison Usher), directed by Jean Epstein, based on the short story by Edgar Allan Poe – (France)
- The Farmer's Wife, directed by Alfred Hitchcock, starring Jameson Thomas and Lillian Hall-Davis – (GB)
- Feel My Pulse, directed by Gregory La Cava, starring Bebe Daniels, Richard Arlen and William Powell
- The First Born, directed by Miles Mander, starring Miles Mander and Madeleine Carroll – (GB)
- Four Sons, directed by John Ford

=== G ===
- The Gallant Hussar (lost), directed by Géza von Bolváry, starring Ivor Novello and Evelyn Holt – (GB/Germany)
- Gang War, directed by Bert Glennon, starring Jack Pickford and Olive Borden
- Gentlemen Prefer Blondes (lost), directed by Mal St. Clair, starring Ruth Taylor and Alice White
- A Girl in Every Port, directed by Howard Hawks, starring Victor McLaglen, Louise Brooks and Robert Armstrong
- The Godless Girl, directed by Cecil B. DeMille, starring Lina Basquette, Marie Prevost and Noah Beery Sr.
- The Guns of Loos, directed by Sinclair Hill, starring Madeleine Carroll (GB)

=== H ===
- Habeas Corpus, directed by Leo McCarey and James Parrott, starring Laurel and Hardy
- Hangman's House, directed by John Ford, starring Victor McLaglen
- The Haunted House, directed by Benjamin Christensen, starring Thelma Todd, based on a 1926 stage play by Owen Davis
- His House in Order (lost), directed by Randle Ayrton, starring Tallulah Bankhead – (GB)
- Homecoming (Heimkehr), directed by Joe May, starring Lars Hanson – (Germany)
- Honor Bound, directed by Alfred E. Green, starring George O'Brien, Estelle Taylor and Leila Hyams
- The House of Terror (lost), a 10-chapter serial directed by Roland D. Reed
- The House on Trubnaya (Dom na Trubnoy), directed by Boris Barnet – (U.S.S.R.)
- Hungarian Rhapsody, directed by Hanns Schwarz, starring Lil Dagover, Willy Fritsch and Dita Parlo – (Germany)
- Huntingtower, directed by George Pearson, starring Harry Lauder – (GB)

=== I ===
- In Old Arizona, directed by Raoul Walsh and Irving Cummings, starring Edmund Lowe, Warner Baxter and Dorothy Burgess, based on a 1907 short story The Caballero's Way by O. Henry
- Interference, directed by Lothar Mendes, starring Evelyn Brent, Clive Brook and William Powell
- The Italian Straw Hat (Un chapeau de paille d'Italie), directed by René Clair – (France)

=== J ===
- Jujiro (Crossroads), directed by Teinosuke Kinugasa – (Japan)

=== L ===
- Ladies of the Mob (lost), directed by William A. Wellman, starring Clara Bow and Richard Arlen
- The Last Command, directed by Joseph von Sternberg, starring Emil Jannings, Evelyn Brent and William Powell
- The Last Warning, directed by Paul Leni, starring Laura La Plante, based on the 1916 novel The House of Fear by Charles Wadsworth Camp
- Laugh, Clown, Laugh, directed by Herbert Brenon, starring Lon Chaney and Loretta Young
- The Leopard Lady (lost), directed by Rupert Julian, starring Jacqueline Logan, Alan Hale and Robert Armstrong, based on the play by Edward Childs Carpenter
- Lights of New York, directed by Bryan Foy
- Lilac Time, directed by George Fitzmaurice, starring Colleen Moore and Gary Cooper
- A Little Bit of Fluff, directed by Wheeler Dryden and Jess Robbins, starring Sydney Chaplin and Betty Balfour – (GB)
- Lonesome, directed by Paul Fejos, starring Glenn Tryon and Barbara Kent

=== M ===
- The Man Who Laughs, directed by Paul Leni, starring Mary Philbin, Conrad Veidt and Olga Baclanova, based on the 1869 novel L'Homme qui rit by Victor Hugo
- Maria Marten, directed by Walter West, starring Trilby Clark and Warwick Ward – (GB)
- The Matinee Idol, directed by Frank Capra, starring Bessie Love and Johnnie Walker
- The Midnight Taxi, directed by John G. Adolfi, Starring Antonio Moreno, Helene Costello and Myrna Loy
- Mother Machree (lost), directed by John Ford, starring Victor McLaglen, Belle Bennett and Neil Hamilton
- Moulin Rouge, directed by Ewald André Dupont – (GB)
- My Man (lost), directed by Archie Mayo, starring Fanny Brice
- Man's Heart — (Malaysia)
- The Mysterious Lady, directed by Fred Niblo, starring Greta Garbo and Conrad Nagel
- The Mysterious Mirror (Der Geheimnisvolle Spiegel), directed by Carl Hoffmann and Richard Teschner – (Germany)

=== N ===
- The New Version of the Ghost of Yotsuya (Shinpan Ōoka seidan), directed by Daisuke Itō, based on the 1825 play Yotsuya Kaidan by Tsuruya Nanboku IV – (Japan)
- Noah's Ark, directed by Michael Curtiz, starring Dolores Costello, George O'Brien and Noah Beery Sr.
- The Noose, directed by John Francis Dillon, starring Richard Barthelmess and Thelma Todd
- Number 17 (Haus Nummer 17), directed by Géza von Bolváry, starring Guy Newall and Lien Deyers – (GB/Germany)

=== O ===
- October: Ten Days That Shook the World (Oktyabr': Desyat' dney kotorye potryasli mir), directed by Sergei Eisenstein and Grigori Aleksandrov – (U.S.S.R.)
- On Trial (lost), directed by Archie Mayo, starring Pauline Frederick, Bert Lytell and Lois Wilson
- Our Dancing Daughters, directed by Harry Beaumont, starring Joan Crawford and Johnny Mack Brown

=== P ===
- The Passion of Joan of Arc (La Passion de Jeanne d'Arc), directed by Carl Theodor Dreyer, starring Renée Jeanne Falconetti – (France)
- The Patsy, directed by King Vidor, starring Marion Davies and Marie Dressler
- The Phantom City, directed by Albert S. Rogell, starring Ken Maynard
- The Power of the Press, directed by Frank Capra, starring Douglas Fairbanks Jr. and Jobyna Ralston

=== R ===
- The Racket, directed by Lewis Milestone, starring Thomas Meighan, Louis Wolheim and Marie Prevost
- Ramona, directed by Edwin Carewe, starring Dolores del Río and Warner Baxter
- Ransom (lost), directed by George B. Seitz, starring Lois Wilson
- Rasputin, the Holy Sinner (Rasputins Liebesabenteuer), directed by Martin Berger – (Germany)
- Rasputin, the Prince of Sinners (Dornenweg einer Fürstin), directed by Nikolai Larin and Boris Nevolin – (Germany/U.S.S.R.)
- The Red Dance, directed by Raoul Walsh, starring Dolores del Río and Charles Farrell
- Red Hair (lost), directed by Clarence G. Badger, starring Clara Bow and Lane Chandler
- The Ringer, directed by Arthur Maude – (GB)
- The Road to Ruin, directed by Norton S. Parker, starring Helen Foster
- Rose-Marie (lost), directed by Lucien Hubbard, starring Joan Crawford

=== S ===
- Sadie Thompson, directed by Raoul Walsh, starring Gloria Swanson and Lionel Barrymore
- The Seashell and the Clergyman (La Coquille et le Clergyman), directed by Germaine Dulac – (France)
- Sex in Chains (Geschlecht in Fesseln), starring and directed by William Dieterle – (Germany)
- Show People, directed by King Vidor, starring Marion Davies and William Haines
- The Singing Fool, directed by Lloyd Bacon, starring Al Jolson
- Sins of the Fathers, directed by Ludwig Berger, starring Emil Jannings and Ruth Chatterton
- Skyscraper, directed by Howard Higgin, starring William Boyd and Alan Hale
- The Smart Set, directed by Jack Conway, starring William Haines
- Something Always Happens, directed by Frank Tuttle, starring Esther Ralston, Neil Hamilton and Sôjin Kamiyama
- A South Sea Bubble, directed by T. Hayes Hunter, starring Ivor Novello and Benita Hume – (GB)
- Speedy, directed by Ted Wilde, starring Harold Lloyd
- Spione (Spies), directed by Fritz Lang, starring Rudolf Klein-Rogge – (Germany)
- Steamboat Bill, Jr., directed by Charles Reisner, starring Buster Keaton and Ernest Torrence
- Steamboat Willie, directed by Walt Disney and Ub Iwerks, debut of Mickey and Minnie Mouse
- Storm Over Asia (Potomok Chingiskhana), directed by Vsevolod Pudovkin, starring Valéry Inkijinoff – (U.S.S.R.)
- Street Angel, directed by Frank Borzage, starring Janet Gaynor and Charles Farrell
- Sweeney Todd, directed by Walter West, based on the 1847 stage play The String of Pearls, or The Fiend of Fleet Street by George Dibdin-Pitt) – (GB)

=== T ===
- Take Me Home (lost), directed by Marshall Neilan, starring Bebe Daniels and Neil Hamilton
- The Tell-Tale Heart, directed by Charles Klein and Leon Shamroy, based on the 1843 short story by Edgar Allan Poe
- Tempest, directed by Sam Taylor, starring John Barrymore, Camilla Horn and Louis Wolheim
- The Terrible People (lost), a 10-chapter serial directed by Spencer Gordon Bennett, starring Allene Ray and Walter Miller, based on the 1926 novel by Edgar Wallace
- The Terror, directed by Roy Del Ruth, starring May McAvoy, Louise Fazenda and Edward Everett Horton, based on the 1927 stage play by Edgar Wallace
- Terror Mountain, directed by Louis King, starring Tom Tyler
- Tesha, directed by Victor Saville and Edwin Greenwood, starring María Corda – (GB)
- Thérèse Raquin (lost), directed by Jacques Feyder – (France)
- A Thief in the Dark, directed by Albert Ray
- Three Sinners, directed by Rowland V. Lee, starring Pola Negri, Warner Baxter and Olga Baclanova
- Tillie's Punctured Romance (lost), directed by A. Edward Sutherland, starring W. C. Fields, Chester Conklin and Louise Fazenda
- Tommy Atkins, directed by Norman Walker, starring Lillian Hall-Davis – GB)
- Toni, directed by Arthur Maude, starring Jack Buchanan – (GB)
- The Trail of '98, directed by Clarence Brown, starring Dolores del Río, Ralph Forbes and Karl Dane
- The Triumph of the Scarlet Pimpernel, directed by T. Hayes Hunter, starring Matheson Lang – (GB)
- Two Tars, directed by James Parrott, starring Laurel and Hardy

=== U ===
- Underground, directed by Anthony Asquith – (GB)

=== V ===
- The Viking, directed by Roy William Neill, starring Donald Crisp
- Vormittagsspuk (Ghosts Before Breakfast), directed by Hans Richter – (Germany)
- The Vortex, directed by Adrian Brunel, starring Ivor Novello – (GB)

=== W ===
- We Faw Down, directed by Leo McCarey, starring Laurel and Hardy
- The Wedding March, directed by and starring Erich von Stroheim with Fay Wray and ZaSu Pitts
- West of Zanzibar, directed by Tod Browning, starring Lon Chaney, Lionel Barrymore and Warner Baxter, based on the 1926 stage play Kongo by Chester De Vonde
- What a Night! (lost), directed by A. Edward Sutherland, starring Bebe Daniels and Neil Hamilton
- While the City Sleeps, directed by Jack Conway, starring Lon Chaney, Anita Page and Mae Busch
- White Shadows in the South Seas, directed by W. S. Van Dyke
- The Wind, directed by Victor Sjöström, starring Lillian Gish and Lars Hanson
- A Woman of Affairs, directed by Clarence Brown, starring John Gilbert, Greta Garbo, Lewis Stone, Johnny Mack Brown and Douglas Fairbanks Jr.

=== Z ===
- Zvenigora, directed by Alexander Dovzhenko – (U.S.S.R.)

== Short film series ==
- Our Gang (1922–1944)
- Laurel and Hardy (1921–1943)

== Animated short film series ==
- Felix the Cat (1919–1936)
- Aesop's Film Fables (1921–1933)
- Krazy Kat (1925–1940)
- Inkwell Imps (1927–1929)
- Oswald the Lucky Rabbit
  - Harem Scarem
  - Neck 'n' Neck
  - The Ol' Swimmin' Hole
  - Africa Before Dark
  - Rival Romeos
  - Bright Lights
  - Oh, What a Knight
  - Sagebrush Sadie
  - Ride'em Plow Boy
  - Sky Scrappers
  - Ozzie of the Mounted
  - Hungry Hobos
  - Poor Papa
  - The Fox Chase
  - Tall Timber
  - Sleigh Bells
  - Hot Dog
- Newslaffs (1927–1928)
- Mickey Mouse
  - Plane Crazy
  - The Gallopin' Gaucho
  - Steamboat Willie

== Births ==
- January 1 – Helen Westcott, American actress (died 1998)
- January 2 – Ellen Kaarma, Estonian actress (died 1973)
- January 5 – Denise Bryer, British actress (died 2021)
- January 7
  - William Peter Blatty, American screenwriter (died 2017)
  - Ante Garmaz, Argentine actor, fashion designer and model (died 2011)
- January 13 - Gregory Walcott, American actor (died 2015)
- January 15 – Joanne Linville, American actress (died 2021)
- January 20 – Peter Donat, Canadian-American actor (died 2018)
- January 23 – Jeanne Moreau, French actress, singer, screenwriter and director (died 2017)
- January 26 – Roger Vadim, French director, screenwriter and actor (died 2000)
- February 1 – Stuart Whitman, American film and television actor (died 2020)
- February 4 – Vincent Wong, Jamaican-born British-Chinese actor (died 2015)
- February 7 - Leonard Jackson, American actor (died 2013)
- February 8 – Jack Larson, American actor (died 2015)
- February 11 – Conrad Janis, American actor (died 2022)
- February 14 - Margaret Bowman, American actress (died 2018)
- February 16 – Eva Ingeborg Scholz, German actress (died 2022)
- February 18 – Little Caesar, American singer and actor (died 1994)
- February 22 – Paul Dooley, American actor, writer and comedian
- February 24 – Al Lettieri, American actor (died 1975)
- February 28
  - Tom Aldredge, American actor (died 2011)
  - Stanley Baker, Welsh actor and film producer (died 1976)
- February 29
  - Joss Ackland, English actor (died 2023)
  - Tempest Storm, American burlesque performer and actress (died 2021)
- March 1 – Jacques Rivette, French director (died 2016)
- March 3 – Joe Conley, American actor (died 2013)
- March 5 - Alyque Padamsee, Indian ad filmmaker and actor (died 2018)
- March 11 – Albert Salmi, American actor (died 1990)
- March 12 - Robert Paynter, English cinematographer and actor (died 2010)
- March 13 – Douglas Rain, Canadian actor (died 2018)
- March 16 – Victor Maddern, English actor (died 1993)
- March 17 – Eunice Gayson, English actress (died 2018)
- March 19
  - Marceline Loridan-Ivens, French actor (died 2018)
  - Patrick McGoohan, Irish actor (died 2009)
  - Jan Shepard, American actress (died 2025)
- March 24 – Vanessa Brown American actress (died 1999)
- March 27 – Reg Evans, British actor (died 2009)
- March 29 – Philip Locke, English actor (died 2004)
- March 30 – Lilia Prado, Mexican actress, dancer (died 2006)
- March 31 – June Jago, Australian actress (died 2010)
- April 1 – George Grizzard, American actor (died 2007)
- April 2 – Piet Römer, Dutch actor (died 2012)
- April 3 – Kevin Hagen, American actor (died 2005)
- April 4
  - Estelle Harris, American actress and comedienne (died 2022)
  - Monty Norman, English composer of the "James Bond Theme" (died 2022)
- April 7
  - James Garner, American actor (died 2014)
  - Valeria Sabel, Italian actress (died 2009)
- April 11 – Henri Garcin, Belgian actor (died 2022)
- April 12 – Hardy Krüger, German actor (died 2022)
- April 23 – Shirley Temple, American actress (died 2014)
- May 1 – Vitaly Melnikov, Russian director and screenwriter (died 2022)
- May 3
  - Jeanne Bal, American actress (died 1996)
  - Julien Guiomar, French actor (died 2010)
- May 7
  - John Ingle, American actor (died 2012)
  - Georgi Rusev, Bulgarian actor (died 2011)
- May 9 - Douglas Rain, Canadian actor (died 2018)
- May 12 – Burt Bacharach, American composer and songwriter (died 2023)
- May 18
  - John Abineri, English actor (died 2000)
  - Sara Shane, American actress (died 2022)
- May 21 – Alice Drummond, American actress (died 2016)
- May 23 – Nigel Davenport, English actor (died 2013)
- May 28 – Gina Cabrera, Cuban actress (died 2022)
- May 30 – Agnès Varda, Belgian-born French director, producer and screenwriter (died 2019)
- June 2 – Bob Amsberry, American actor (died 1957)
- June 4 – Ruth Westheimer, German-American sex therapist, talk show host and actress (died 2024)
- June 5 – Robert Lansing, American actor (died 1994)
- June 7 – James Ivory, American director, producer and screenwriter
- June 8 – Mimi Mariani, Indonesian actress, model, and singer (died 1971)
- June 9 – Jackie Mason, American stand-up comedian and actor (died 2021)
- June 12
  - Vic Damone, American singer, entertainer and actor (died 2018)
  - Tom Rosqui, American character actor (died 1991)
  - Richard M. Sherman, American film songwriter (died 2024)
- June 13 – Nikola Todev, Bulgarian actor (died 1991)
- June 15 – Morgan Jones, American actor (died 2012)
- June 16 – Ernst Stankovski, Austrian actor (died 2022)
- June 19 – Nancy Marchand, American actress (died 2000)
- June 20
  - William Berger, American actor (died 1993)
  - Martin Landau, American actor (died 2017)
- June 21 – Margit Bara, Hungarian actress (died 2016)
- June 22 – Ralph Waite, American actor (died 2014)
- June 29 – Ian Bannen, Scottish actor (died 1999)
- June 30 – Clifford David, American actor and singer (died 2017)
- July 5 - Warren Oates, American actor (died 1982)
- July 6 – Nestor de Villa, Filipino actor (died 2004)
- July 7 – Pat Hitchcock, English actress and producer (died 2021)
- July 9 – Vince Edwards, American actor, director, and singer (died 1996)
- July 12 – Peter Cellier, English actor
- July 13
  - Bob Crane, American actor (died 1978)
  - Mace Neufeld, American film and television producer (died 2022)
- July 14 – Nancy Olson, American actress
- July 15 – Tom Troupe, American actor and writer (died 2025)
- July 21 – Chuck Low, American actor (died 2017)
- July 22 – Orson Bean, American actor (died 2020)
- July 24 – Michael Currie, American actor (died 2009)
- July 26 – Joe Jackson, American talent manager (died 2018)
- July 26 - Stanley Kubrick, American director (died 1999)
- August 1 – Nick LaTour, American actor (died 2011)
- August 6 – Andy Warhol, American artist and director (died 1987)
- August 10 – Gus Mercurio, American-born Australian character actor (died 2010)
- August 14
  - Joëlle Bernard, French actress (died 1977)
  - Jacques Rouffio, French director and screenwriter (died 2016)
  - Lina Wertmüller, Italian screenwriter and director (died 2021)
- August 15
  - Nosher Powell, English actor and stuntman (died 2013)
  - Nicolas Roeg, English director (died 2018)
  - Simone Silva, Egyptian-born French actress (died 1957)
  - Raymond Llewellyn, Welsh actor
- August 18 – Norma Donaldson, American actress and singer (died 1994)
- August 20 - Buddy Van Horn, American stunt coordinator and director (died 2021)
- August 27 – Bernard Atha, English actor (died 2022)
- August 28 – Charles Gray, English actor (died 2000)
- August 31 – James Coburn, American actor (died 2002)
- September 1
  - George Maharis, American actor (died 2023)
  - Allene Roberts, American actor (died 2019)
- September 3 – Pilar Pallete, Peruvian actress
- September 4 – Dick York, American actor (died 1992)
- September 9 – Darrell Zwerling, American character actor (died 2014)
- September 10 - Selma Lopes, Brazilian voice actress
- September 11 – Earl Holliman, American actor (died 2024)
- September 17 – Roddy McDowall, British actor (died 1998)
- September 19 – Adam West, American actor (died 2017)
- September 22 – Eugene Roche, American actor (died 2004)
- October 1
  - Laurence Harvey, Lithuanian British actor (died 1973)
  - George Peppard, American actor (died 1994)
  - Erica Yohn, American actress (died 2019)
- October 2 – George McFarland, American actor (died 1993)
- October 6 – Barbara Werle, American actress (died 2013)
- October 17 – Don Collier, American actor (died 2021)
- October 25
  - Jeanne Cooper, American actress (died 2013)
  - Anthony Franciosa, American actor (died 2006)
  - Marion Ross, American actress
- October 29
  - Ben Chapman, American actor (died 2008)
  - Jack Donner, American actor (died 2019)
- November 1 – Emmaline Henry, American actress (died 1979)
- November 3
  - Wanda Hendrix, American actress (died 1981)
  - Lew Palter, American actor (died 2023)
- November 4 - Shaike Ophir, Israeli actor, comedian, screenwriter and director (died 1987)
- November 5 – Gwen Van Dam, American actress (died 2024)
- November 10
  - Ennio Morricone, Italian composer (died 2020)
  - Norma Crane, American actress (died 1973)
- November 13
  - Helena Carroll, Scottish-American actress (died 2013)
  - Ralph Foody, American actor (died 1999)
- November 14 – Kathleen Hughes, American actress (died 2025)
- November 16 – Clu Gulager, American actor (died 2022)
- November 20 – Franklin Cover, American actor (died 2006)
- November 23 – Elmarie Wendel, American actress singer (died 2018)
- November 25 – Rance Howard, American actor (died 2017)
- December 1 – Malachi Throne, American actor (died 2013)
- December 3 – Carlo Giuffrè, Italian actor (died 2018)
- December 5 – Barbara Krafftówna, Polish actress (died 2022)
- December 6 – Lance Fuller, American actor (died 2001)
- December 9 – Dick Van Patten, American actor (died 2015)
- December 10 – Barbara Nichols, American actress (died 1976)
- December 12
  - Lionel Blair, English actor and television presenter (died 2021)
  - Roberto Contreras, American actor (died 2000)
- December 13 – Nati Mistral, Spanish actress (died 2017)
- December 16 – Terry Carter, American actor and filmmaker (died 2024)
- December 17
  - Leonid Bronevoy, Russian actor (died 2017)
  - George Lindsey, American actor and stand-up comedian (died 2012)
- December 21 – Colleen Townsend, American actress
- December 22 - Bunny Levine, American actress (died 2026)
- December 25 – Dick Miller, American actor (died 2019)
- December 29
  - Bernard Cribbins, English actor and singer (died 2022)
  - June Preston, American child actress (died 2022)

== Deaths ==
- January 2 – Emily Stevens, American stage & film actress (born 1882)
- January 3 – Claude France, German film actress (born 1893)
- January 11 - Rapley Holmes, Canadian stage and screen actor (born 1868)
- January 25 – Charles Gorman, American stage and screen actor (born 1865)
- January 26 - Earl Metcalfe, American actor, (born 1889)
- February 22 – Rudolph J. Bergquist American cinematographer
- March 5 – Lidia Quaranta, Italian actress (born 1891)
- March 13 – Elsie Mackay, British actress and heiress; lost at sea (born 1893)
- April 22 – Frank Currier, American director, stage & silent film actor (born 1857)
- June 22 – George Siegmann, American silent film actor (born 1882)
- June 24 – Holbrook Blinn, American stage & silent film actor (born 1872)
- July 20 – Scott Sidney, American film director (born 1872)
- July 21
  - Ellen Terry, British stage actress of the Victorian and Edwardian times and later a silent film actress (born 1847)
  - Ward Crane, American film actor (born 1890)
- August 10 – Rex Cherryman, American actor (born 1896)
- August 17 – Frank Urson, American film director (born 1887)
- August 26 – Colin Campbell, British-born film director (born 1859)
- October 8 – Larry Semon, American film comedian (born 1889)
- November 10 – Anita Berber, German film actress (born 1899)
- November 19 – Jeanne Bérangère, French stage and film actress (born 1864)
- December 14 – Theodore Roberts, American film actor (born 1861)
- December 25 – Fred Thomson, American film actor (born 1890)

== Film debuts ==
- Mabel Albertson – Gang War
- Mischa Auer – Something Always Happens
- Ward Bond – Noah's Ark
- Joe E. Brown – Crooks Can't Win
- Dorothy Burgess – In Old Arizona
- Madeleine Carroll – The Guns of Loos
- Hobart Cavanaugh – San Francisco Nights
- Ruth Chatterton – Sins of the Fathers
- G. Pat Collins – The Racket
- Andy Devine – That's My Daddy
- Lien Deyers – Spione
- Stuart Erwin – Mother Knows Best
- Anne Grey – The Constant Nymph
- Gustl Gstettenbaur – Spione
- Jean Harlow – Honor Bound
- Paul Hörbiger – Spione
- Merna Kennedy – The Circus
- Mae Madison – The Play Girl
- Anna Magnani – Scampolo
- Ray Milland – Moulin Rouge
- Edward Nugent – The Man in Hobbles
- Merle Oberon – The Three Passions
- Lynne Overman – The Perfect Crime
- Ellen Pollock – Moulin Rouge
- Randolph Scott – Sharp Shooters
- Delmar Watson – Taxi 13
- Harry Watson – Taxi 13
