= Khaspush =

1928 film

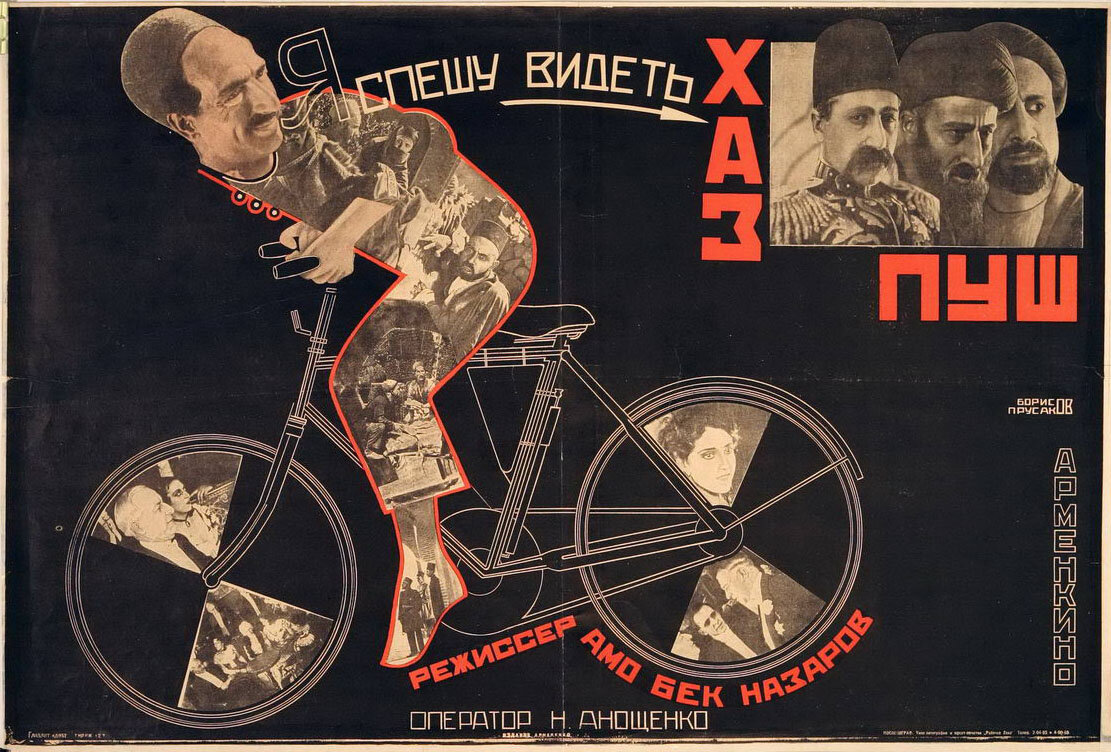
- Directed by: Hamo Beknazarian
- Written by: Hamo Beknazarian; G. Braginsky; A. Ter-Hovnanyan
- Story by: Raffi (story); Vrtanes Papazian (story)
- Starring: Hrachia Nersisyan; M. Dulgaryan; Avet Avetisyan
- Cinematography: Nikolai Anoshchenko
- Production company: Armenkino
- Release date: 3 January 1928 (Soviet Union)
- Running time: 72 min
- Country: Soviet Union
- Language: Silent

Khaspush (Armenian: Խասփուշ, Russian: Хас-пуш) is a 1927 Soviet Armenian drama and war film, directed by Hamo Beknazarian and starring Hrachia Nersisyan, M. Dulgaryan and Avet Avetisyan

== Synopsis ==
The film is about the Persian revolutionary movement of the peasants and townspeople against the dominance of the English tobacco monopoly. Persia in 1891 is an arena of fierce clashes between foreign monopolies. In the fight between the English and the Russian capital, the victory belongs to the English monopoly. The country remains without bread. Impoverished peasants and artisans - the khaspush - raise a revolt against the foreign colonizers. Initially the uprising is led by the merchants and the clergy. The poverty-stricken citizens smash the British Embassy. At a critical moment the merchants and the clergy are remove themselves from the fight, betraying the masses. Khaspush union, acting under the protection of the Sharia flag removes their religious facade. The urban poor are beginning to realize their true class interests. Although the rebellion is suppressed, the idea of the necessity of social struggle remains in the minds of the oppressed people.

== Cast ==
- Hrachia Nersisyan as Rza
- M. Dulgaryan as Fatima
- Avet Avetisyan as Head of police
- T. Ayvazyan as Hasan
- Hambartsum Khachanyan as Prime Minister
- M. Janan as Seyid
- M. Garagash as Merchant
- T. Shamirkhanyan as Peasant
- Vagharsh Vagharshyan as Shah
- Amasi Martirosyan as Mulla
