= David Bek (film) =

- Directed by: Hamo Beknazarian
- Written by: Hamo Beknazarian; Y. Dukor; Vladimir Solovyov; S. Harutyunyan
- Starring: Hrachia Nersisyan; Avet Avetisyan; Hasmik; Yevgeny Samoylov
- Cinematography: Garosh Bek-Nazaryan (on location); Dmitriy Feldman (studio)
- Music by: Ashot Satyan
- Production company: Yerevan Film Studio
- Release date: 14 February 1944 (Moscow)
- Running time: 94 min
- Country: Soviet Union
- Languages: Armenian, Russian

David Bek (Armenian: Դավիթ Բեկ) is a 1944 Soviet biographical adventure and drama film directed by Hamo Beknazarian and starring Hrachia Nersisyan, Avet Avetisyan and Hasmik The film is about Davit Bek, an Armenian nobleman and revolutionary and is based on the novel David Bek by Raffi (1882).

== Cast ==
- Hrachia Nersisyan as Davit Bek
- Avet Avetisyan
- Hasmik
- Yevgeny Samoylov
- Arus Asryan
- Grigor Avetyan
- L. Zohrabyan
- Murad Kostanyan
- David Malyan
- T. Ayvazyan
- Vaghinak Marguni
- Frunze Dovlatyan
- Tatyana Makhmuryan
- L. Shahparonyan
- Vladimir Yershov
- Evgeniy Samoylov
- Lev Sverdlin
- Ivane Perestiani
- Arman Kotikyan
- H. Stepanyan
- D. Pogosyan
