= Krivoi Rog (film) =

1928 film

- Directed by: Aleksandr Gavronsky
- Written by: Sergei Ermolinsky
- Produced by: Gosvoenkino
- Starring: Ivan Chuvelev, Dmitri Vasiliev, Ivan Shtrauh, Evgeny Tokmakov
- Cinematography: Igor Gelein
- Distributed by: Central Studio of Newsreels
- Release date: 30 April 1929
- Country: USSR
- Language: Russian (subtitles)

Krivoi Rog (Russian: Кривой Рог) is a 1928 USSR comedian drama propaganda film. The film is now considered a lost film, with no known complete copies remaining.

== Plot ==
A film about the cultural and educational work in the countryside. The action takes place during the offensive against the Kulaks. In the village for a short time Red Army soldier arrives, Andrei. He seeks to wrest the youth from influence of the rural priest

== See also ==
- List of Ukrainian films
- Krivoi Rog, city in Ukraine
- List of lost films
