= Man's Heart =

1928 film

Man's Heart (男子的心)
- Production company: Kwong Kwong Motion Picture Company (Chinese: 光光影片公司)
- Release date: 29 November 1928
- Running time: 9 reels
- Countries: Malaysia; United Kingdom
- Languages: silent film with Chinese and English subtitles

Man's Heart (Chinese: 男子的心) is a British-Malaysian tragedy silent film about the overseas Chinese community in the tin mining industry. Produced and released in 1928, the film was presented by the Kwong Kwong Motion Picture Company (Chinese: 光光影片公司), which was located in Seremban, Negeri Sembilan state. Its film crew and shooting equipment came from the past Nanyang Low Pui-kim's self-made Motion Picture Company (Chinese: 南洋劉貝錦自製影片公司) in Singapore.

== Release record ==
- Seremban, Negeri Sembilan, Malaysia
  - Premiere in "(時新戲院)" in Seremban
- Singapore
  - one ticket to watch two movies, with another 1927 silent film "(血淚碑)" from Shanghai Star Motion Pictures Company, in Marlborough Theatre (曼舞羅戲院) in Beach Road, Singapore, total four days, from 29 November to 2 December 1928.

== Plot ==
In order to seek more girlfriends, a Chinese man abandons his family, leaving his wife and son to a hard life. In the end, all his lovers leave him, and he suffers retribution for his sin.
