= Oktyabryukhov and Dekabryukhov =

1928 film

- Russian: Октябрюхов и Декабрюхов
- Directed by: O. Iskander; Aleksei Smirnov
- Written by: Vladimir Mayakovsky
- Starring: Georgi Astafyev; Leonid Barbe; Afanasi Belov; Valeriy Gakkebush; Dmitriy Kapka
- Cinematography: I. Gudima
- Release date: 1928
- Country: Soviet Union
- Language: Russian

Oktyabryukhov and Dekabryukhov (Russian: Октябрюхов и Декабрюхов) is a 1928 Soviet comedy film directed by O. Iskander and Aleksei Smirnov.

== Plot ==
Nikolay Dekabryukhov as a result of the revolution throws his wife and leaves the country to Paris, where he tells the local people about his exploits. Meanwhile, his wife is marrying his brother.

== Cast ==
- Georgi Astafyev
- Leonid Barbe
- Afanasi Belov
- Valeriy Gakkebush as White Emigrant with a Stain
- Dmitriy Kapka
- T. Kochkina
- V. Korsch
