= Alexander Shirvanzade =

Armenian playwright and novelist

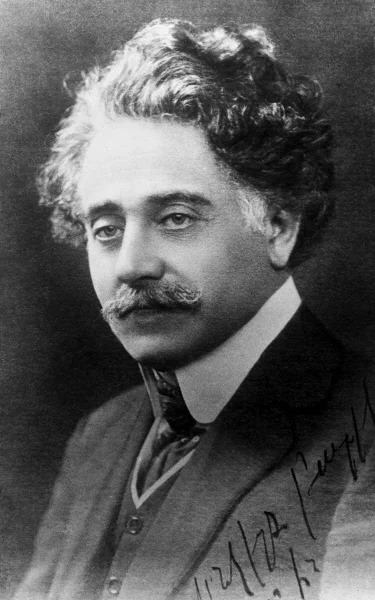
- Born: Alexander Movsisian; 18 April 1858 Shamakhi, Russian Empire
- Died: 7 August 1935 (aged 77) Kislovodsk, Soviet Union
- Occupation: Writer, playwright
- Literary movement: Realism

Alexander Minasi Movsisian (Armenian: Ալեքսանդր Մինասի Մովսիսեան; 18 April 1858 – 7 August 1935), better known by his pen name Alexander Shirvanzade (Armenian: Ալեքսանդր Շիրվանզադէ) was an Armenian playwright and novelist. He was one of the main representatives of the realist movement in Armenian literature.

== Life and work ==
Alexander Movsisian was born on 18 April 1858 into a tailor's family in Shamakhi, the center of the historical province of Shirvan (then Shemakha Governorate, Russian Empire, modern-day Azerbaijan), from which he later derived his pen name Shirvanzade (meaning "son of Shirvan" in Persian). Shamakhi was a multicultural and once-prosperous economic and administrative center which was declining with the growth of nearby Baku. Shirvanzade received his earliest education at a school run by a Protestant Armenian preacher, then attended the Armenian parish school. His father, considering a Russian-language education to be more useful for his son, moved Alexander to the local Russian two-year school, from which he graduated in 1872. As a youth, he participated in amateur theater groups and wrote a vaudeville. Shirvanzade was prevented from pursuing further education when his father, who had attempted to make a fortune as a dye-maker, went bankrupt and moved to Quba to resume work as a tailor. In 1875, at the age of seventeen, Shirvanzade left for Baku to find work to support his family and never returned to his hometown. For eight years, he worked as a clerk and bookkeeper in the offices of the provincial administration and various private firms, including oil companies. He saw firsthand the formation of a new capitalist class and the struggle for oil in Baku. His experiences influenced his political and social outlook.

In Baku, Shirvanzade initially lived with his relatives the Abelians, a family which included several cultural figures and intellectuals (including Hovhannes Abelian, who later gained renown for his performances in Shirvanzade's plays). It was here that he first began to familiarize himself with literature and the press. He read the works of Armenian authors, including the novels of Khachatur Abovian, Raffi and Perch Proshian, the poetry of Mikayel Nalbandian and Raphael Patkanian, the plays of Gabriel Sundukian, and the journal Hyusisap’ayl. He read Russian literature and the works of European authors such as Stendhal, Honoré de Balzac, Gustave Flaubert, Émile Zola and Shakespeare (he especially enjoyed the works of the latter). He also read many works on philosophy and economics. He benefited from the library recently founded by the Armenian Philanthropic Society of Baku and served as that library's librarian for some time. Shirvanzade began writing for the Armenian and Russian press, writing articles about the oil industry and the state of the working class. In 1883, he published his first literary works in the Armenian newspaper Mshak, a short story titled "Hrdeh navt’agortsaranum" (Fire at the Oil Wells), which highlights the mistreatment of oilfield workers, and a novella titled Gortsakatari hishatakaranits’ (From the diary of a salesman). That same year, he moved to Tiflis (modern-day Tbilisi, Georgia), where he became acquainted with many Armenian writers and intellectuals. In 1885, he published his first major novel, Namus (Honor), in the weekly Ardzagank’, which earned him recognition. The novel takes place in the author's hometown, Shamakhi. Tragedy befalls its two protagonists, caused by repressive traditions and the influence of money. Another one of his works, Fat’man yev Asadë (Fatma and Asad, 1888), is written on a similar theme. He worked as a secretary for Ardzagank’ from 1886 to 1891 and published several more literary works there, as well as articles and reviews in which he expressed his support for realism, as he understood it. In Shirvanzade's view, realist literature should avoid open tendentiousness and should not merely replicate real life in a "photographic" manner (he was strongly opposed to naturalism).

Shirvanzade wrote many works during the 1890s. According to literary scholar Hrant Tamrazian, Shirvanzade's best works were written in the 1890s and on the eve of the 1905 Russian Revolution, a time of vibrant social and political activity. During the Hamidian massacres of Armenians in the Ottoman Empire in 1895–96, Shirvanzade, who was a member of the Hunchakian Party (a socialist and Armenian nationalist organization), wrote articles in defense of the Ottoman Armenians and went to Russia to organize aid for them. However, he was accused of provoking a rebellion against the Ottoman government and was imprisoned in Tiflis. While imprisoned, he decided to write the novel K’aos (Chaos, 1898), which is regarded as his masterpiece and has been called the greatest work of Armenian realism. The novel is set in Baku and depicts a conflict over money within the family of an Armenian oil magnate, showing how industrial capitalism transforms the protagonists.

In 1898, Shirvanzade was exiled for two years to Odessa, where he continued to write actively. He returned to Baku and wrote a number of plays on women's issues, including Yevgine (1903) and Uner iravunk’ (Did she have the right? 1903). He addresses both capitalism and women's issues in his drama Patvi hamar (1904, English translation For the Sake of Honor, 1976). Shirvanzade is considered an important figure in the development of Armenian dramaturgy, both as a playwright and a critic. He wrote both dramas and comedies and was the continuator of Gabriel Sundukian in his portrayals of modern Armenian life and socio-political issues. In 1916, Maxim Gorky wrote that Shirvanzade's works "were known and read not only in the Caucasus but also in England, in the Scandinavian Peninsula, and Italy."

Shirvanzade lived in Paris from 1905 to 1910. He was deeply affected by the suffering of the Armenian people during the Armenian genocide and condemned the actions of the Ottoman government and the policies of the great powers in his articles and letters. In 1919, Shirvanzade went abroad again for medical treatment. He lived in France and the United States. He returned permanently to the USSR in 1926 and settled in Yerevan. He undertook the publication of his collected works in eight volumes and revised many of his works. He also wrote his memoirs, titled Kyank’i bovits’ (From the crucible of life), which Kevork Bardakjian praises as "a lively and insightful account of people, places, and events." The work is remembered for its descriptions of a number of prominent Armenian cultural figures whom Shirvanzade knew, including actor Petros Adamian and writers Raffi, Ghazaros Aghayan, Perch Proshian and Gabriel Sundukian. He became a member of the Union of Soviet Writers and the Union of Azerbaijani Writers, participating in the founding congresses of both in 1934. He died in Kislovodsk in 1935 and was buried in Komitas Pantheon, which is located in the city center of Yerevan.

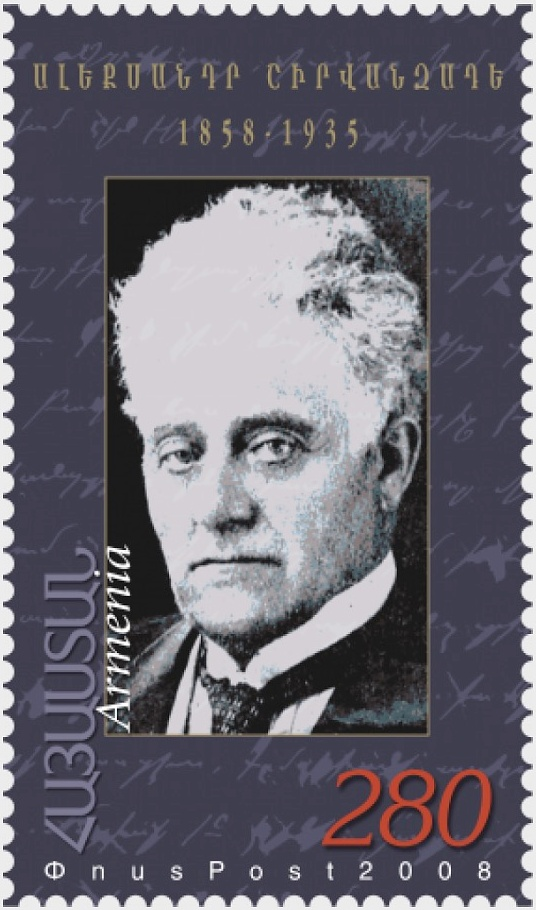
Stamp of Armenia, 2008

== Legacy ==
Several of Shirvanzade's works were adapted into films in Soviet Armenia: Namus in 1925, Char vogi in 1927, Patvi hamar in 1956, Morgani khnamin ("Morgan's In-law") in 1970, and Chaos in 1973. A street and a school in Yerevan are named after him, as well as a theater in Kapan.

== Works ==
From the collection of the Library of Congress, Washington, DC:

- Artistē (1924)
- Char ogi; Namus; Patwi hamar (1979)
- Erker: hing hatorov Collected works, 5 volumes. (1986–1988)
- Erker (1983)
- Erkeri zhoghovatsu: tasě hatorov (1959)
- Evil spirit: a play Translated from the Armenian Char ogi by Nishan Parlakian. (1980) ISBN 0-934728-01-1
- For the sake of honor Translated from Badvi hamar and with an introd. by Nishan Parlakian. (1976)
- Erkeri liakatar zhoghovatsu (1934)
- Iz-za chesti (1941)
- Izbrannoe (1947, 1949, 1952)
- Kʻaos: vēp (1956)
- Melania: vēpik: kovkasean irakan keankʻitsʻ (1938)
- Sobranie sochineniĭ 3 volumes. (1957)
- Tsʻawagarě (1958)
- Verjin shatruaně: sēnario (1937)
- Yōtʻ patmuatskʻner (1920)
