= Pepo (film) =

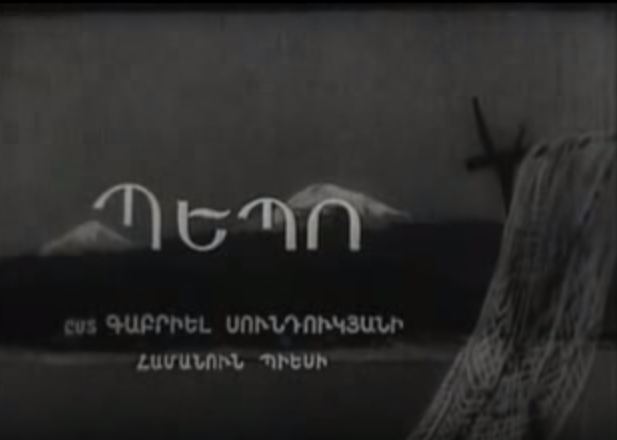
- USSR (Armenfilm) movie "Pepo" (Պեպո) title.
- Directed by: Hamo Beknazarian; Armen Gulakyan
- Written by: Hamo Beknazarian
- Starring: Hrachia Nersisyan; Avet Avetisyan; Hasmik; Grigor Avetyan
- Cinematography: Dmitri Feldman
- Music by: Aram Khachaturian
- Production company: Armenfilm
- Distributed by: Amkino Corporation (1935) (USA) (subtitled)
- Release date: 9 October 1935
- Running time: 88 min.
- Country: Soviet Union
- Languages: Armenian, Russian

Pepo (Armenian: Պեպո) is a 1935 Soviet drama film based on Gabriel Sundukyan's 1876 play of the same name, scripted and directed by Hamo Beknazarian, with music composed by Aram Khachaturian. Considered the 'most outstanding' film in Soviet cinema before the outbreak of World War II, the film has gained international recognition and has come to represent Armenian culture abroad.

== Plot ==
Set in 19th century Tiflis, the film details the day-to-day life of a poor but honest Armenian fisherman Pepo (Hrachia Nersisyan) who opposes a cunning trader Arutin Kirakozovich Zimzimov (Avet Avetisyan), who has robbed the former by trickery. The story comes to a conclusion of sorts when Pepo falls in love.

== Cast ==
- Hrachia Nersisyan – Pepo
- Tatyana Makhmuryan – Kekel, his sister
- David Malyan – Kakuli, a friend
- Avet Avetisyan – Arutin Kirakozovich Zimzimov
- Hambartsum Khachanyan – Darcho, merchant
- Hasmik – Shushan
- Grigor Avetyan – Giko
- Nina Manucharyan – Natel
- Armen Gulakyan – Duduli, a friend
- N. Gevorgyan – Efemia
- Gurgen Gabrielyan – Kinto
- A. Kefchiyan – Pichkhul
- H. Vanyan – Margurit
- M. Garagash – Gevorg, clerk
- Vladimir Barsky – Judge
- V. Bagratuni – Samson
- M. Beroyan – Darcho's mother
- M. Jrpetyan – Gossiper

== Reception in the United States ==
Pepo was screened in the United States shortly after its premiere and was released via Soviet distribution channels, including bookings associated with the "Armenkino". Contemporary American press responses were mixed. According to Bakhchinyan, a review in The New York Times (10 October 1935) emphasized the film's period setting, comedic tone, and its ethnographic interest—especially street life, market scenes, dancing, and music—while noting that English titles made the story understandable. A review in the New York Herald Tribune (11 October 1935) described the film as dull and incomplete, and Motion Picture Daily (late 1935) suggested that the picture would primarily appeal to audiences fluent in the language, also criticizing the limited subtitles for non-Armenian viewers. Despite divergent assessments, the film’s American screenings and critical coverage are considered an early example of an Armenian Soviet sound feature receiving attention in U.S. cinemas.

== Images ==
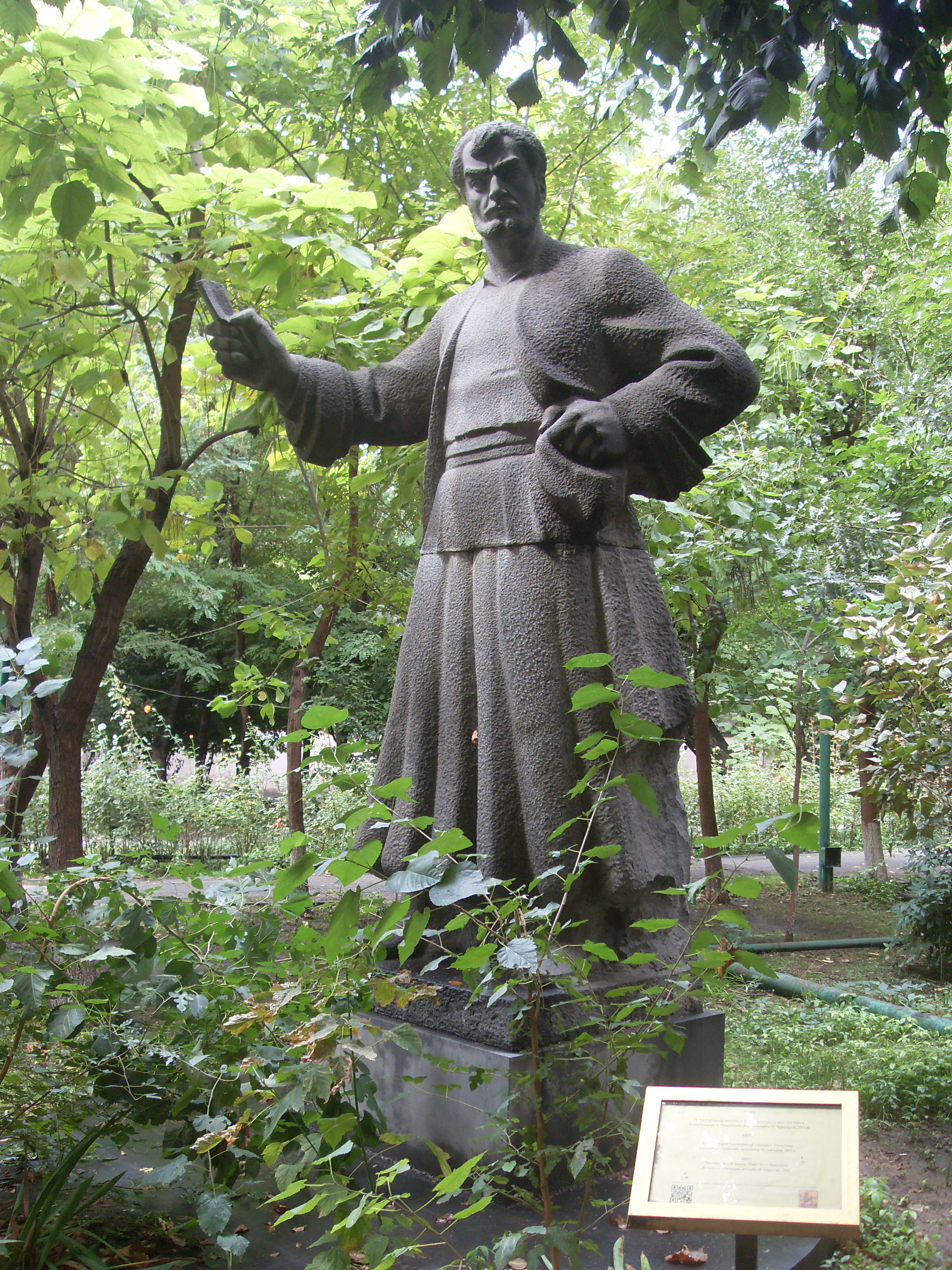
Pepo's statue in Yerevan

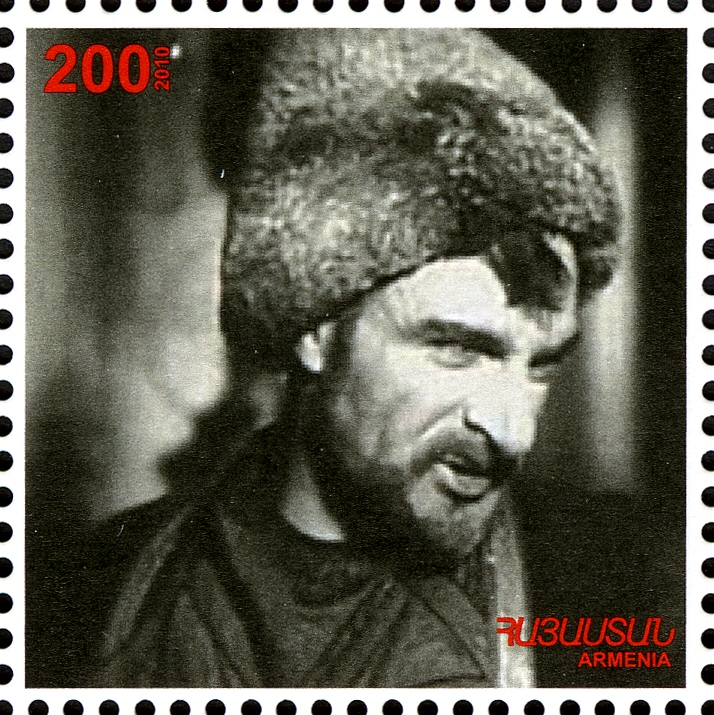
Pepo

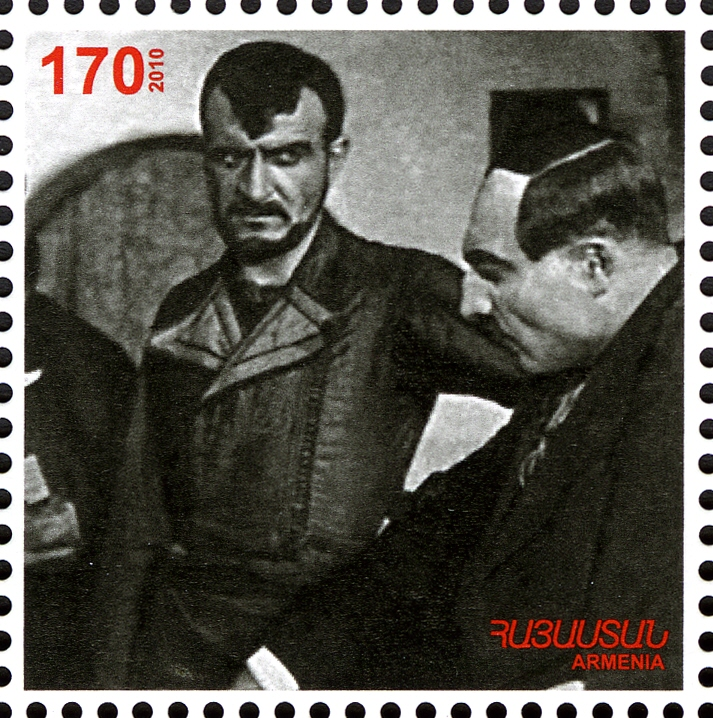
Pepo and Zimzimov

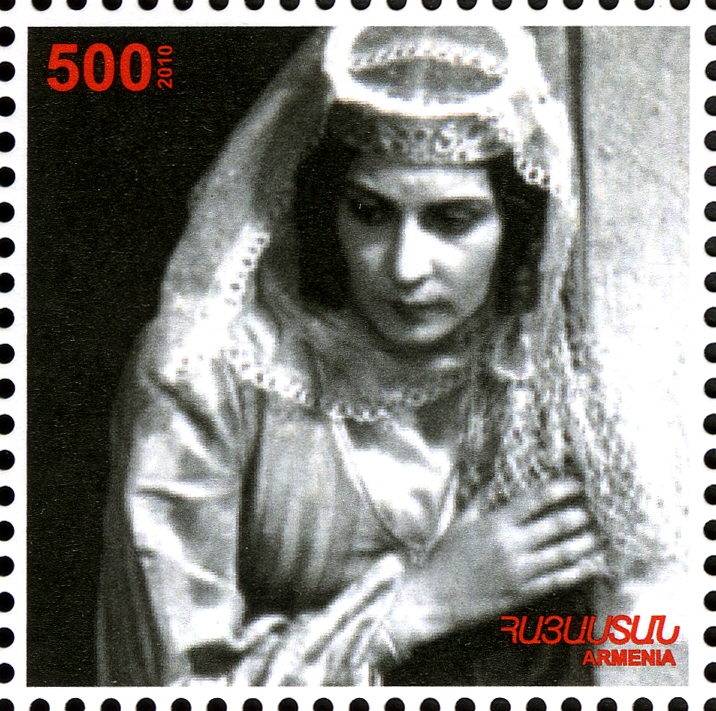
Kekel
