= Nina Manucharyan =

- Born: Նինա Նիկոլայի Մանուչարյան; 17 February 1885
- Died: 3 September 1972 (aged 87); Yerevan
- Occupation: Actress
- Years active: 1925–1935

Nina Manucharyan (Armenian: Նինա Մանուչարյան, 17 February 1885 – 3 September 1972) was an Armenian film actress.

== Filmography ==
- Namus (1925)
- Shor and Shorshor (1926)
- The Slave (1927)
- Zare (1927)
- Evil Spirit (1927)
- The Power of Evil (1928)
- Anush (1931)
- Harut (1933)
- Pepo (1935)
