= Zangezur (film) =

- Directed by: Hamo Beknazarian; Yakov Dukor
- Written by: Axel Bakunts; Hamo Beknazarian
- Starring: Hrachia Nersisyan; Avet Avetisyan; Hasmik
- Cinematography: Garosh Beknazarian; Ivan Dildaryan
- Music by: Aram Khachaturian
- Production company: Armenkino
- Distributed by: Armenkino
- Release date: May 23, 1938
- Running time: 89 minutes
- Country: Soviet Union
- Languages: Armenian; Russian

Zangezur is a 1938 Soviet Armenian war film by Hamo Beknazarian. A propaganda film released on the eve of World War II, it depicts the 1921 anti-Bolshevik uprising in Zangezur (present-day Syunik), in which Dashnak forces clashed with the Red Army and Armenian Bolshevik partisans.

== Production ==
According to Ashot Hovhannisian, the idea for the film was conceived by Anastas Mikoyan. The screenplay was originally written by Axel Bakunts, before his arrest in 1936 during the Great Purge. The film score was composed by Aram Khachaturian. For the film, director Beknazarian was awarded the Stalin Prize, 2nd degree, in 1941.

== Cast ==
- Hrachia Nersisyan - Hakobyan
- Avet Avetisyan - Sparapet (based on Garegin Nzhdeh)
- Hasmik - Agyul
- David Malyan - Makich
- Gurgen Janibekyan - Sako
- Gurgen Gabrielyan - Armen
- Grigoriy Avetyan - deaf old man
- Gegham Harutyunyan - Samvel
- Andrei Kostrichkin - Denikin Colonel Markov
- Ivan Chuvelev - Nikita
- Galust Sululikyan - Atyun Aper
- Amasi Martirosyan - Dashnak officer
- Murad Kostanyan - Dashnak officer
- Haykasar Minasaryan - Gusan
- A. Arakelyan - Aznar
- Bella Isahakyan - Anush
- Grigory Margaryan - soldier
- Mikael Garagash - Samson
- Yunis Nuri - Azeri partisan
- Vladimir Tsoppi - English major
