= Sargis Barkhudaryan =

Armenian composer, pianist and educator

Sargis Barkhudaryan (Armenian: Սարգիս Բարխուդարյան) (August 26, 1887 – October 25, 1973) was an Armenian composer, pianist and educator.

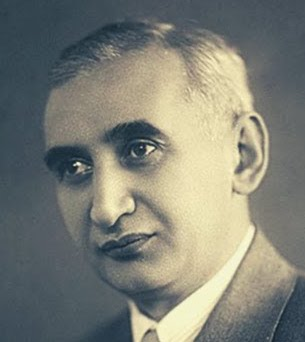
Sargis Barkhudaryan

== Biography ==
Born in Tiflis (now Tbilisi), Georgia. Sargis was one of the eight children of a successful businessman, who died when his son was only a teenager. The young man grew up in a musical household. Their house was near an open marketplace and here Sargis heard different tunes sung by vendors, which he was able to reproduce on various folk instruments. Finally, a piano was purchased and Sargis began to take private lessons, initially from Sofia Karakhanyan and later at the local music school, where he eventually enrolled in the class of Lyutsan Lyutsanovich Truskovsku.

In 1900, Sargis’s mother Vartuhi sent the young man to Armenia to become familiar with his native culture. There he met Komitas and was deeply affected. In 1907, like Komitas before him, Barkhudaryan left for Berlin, Germany, to refine his musical education. In the beginning, he studied the piano privately with Prof. Schultz but shortly he joined the student body of the Royal Conservatory itself. In Berlin, he made important contacts and got involved in local Armenian activities. Later, he entered the Petrograd Conservatory (now the Saint Petersburg Conservatory), enrolling in the theory and composition classes of Maximilian Steinberg and Yosep Vitol.

He graduated in 1915. Barkhudaryan taught in the conservatories of Tbilisi and later of Yerevan. In 1936, Sargis Barkhudaryan was named the Honored Worker of Georgian SSR and in 1960, the People's Artist of Armenian SSR. He has written mostly piano miniatures.

He died in Tbilisi and is buried in Yerevan.

== Compositions ==
=== Piano ===
- Արևելյան պարեր (4 պիես) (Four Oriental Dances, 1910 – 1913)
- Դաշնամուրային պիեսներ - առաջին սերիա՝ Էսքիզ, Ակվարել, Հեքիաթ, Էսքիզ, Օրորոցային, Աշնանային (Piano Pieces, First Series, 1910 – 1918)
- Սոնատ, 4 մասից (Sonata in four movements, 1915)
- Դաշնամուրային պիեսներ - երկրորդ սերիա՝ Շուրջպար, Մենապար, Էսքիզ, Պրելյուդ No. 2` «Աշուն» (Piano Pieces, Second Series, 1915 – 1923)
- Նազ-պար (Coy Dance, 1921)
- Պոեմ «Ճգնավորի խցիկում» (Poem: "In the Cell of an Ascetic")
- Ժողովրդական պար «Հայաստան» (Folk Dance: Armenia, 1926)
- Սյուիտ դաշնամուրի համար, 4 մասից (Suite for piano, in four movements, 1932)
- Անդանտե (Andante, 1932)
- Մանկական պիեսների ժողովածու (12 պիես) (Collection of 12 Children’s Pieces, 1939)
- Պիեսների ժողովածու պատանեկութեան համար (12 պիես) (Collection of 12 Pieces for Adolescents, 1942 – 1943)
- Aquarelle

=== Vocal ===
- Սայաթ Նովայի 8 երգ (մշակումներ) (Eight songs after Sayat Nova, 1932 – 1933)
- Ժողովրդական երգերի մշակումներ («Սարի աղջիկ», «Ծամով աղջիկ» «Դլե յաման», «Սիրուհիս», «Մաճկալ ես», «Քյոռ-օղլի») (Arrangement of folk songs, 1927 - 1936)
- Վոկալ շարք Ավ. Իսահակյանի տեքստերով (Vocal cycle on poems by Avetik Isahakyan, 1959)

=== Ballet ===
- «Նարինե», 4 գործողություն (“Nariné” in four acts, 1938)

=== Children’s Opera ===
- «Քեռի Քուչի», 4 գործողություն (“Uncle Kushi” in four acts, 1946)

=== Symphonic ===
- Սիմֆոնիկ պոեմ «Անուշ», 4 մասից (Anush, Symphonic Poem in four movements, 1916 - 1917)
- Սյուիտ «Զակֆետերացիա» (Suite, 1932)
- Սյուիտ լարային նվագախումբի համար (Suite for string orchestra, 1939)
- Երկու սյուիտ «Նարինե» բալետից (Two Suites from the ballet Nariné, 1942)
- Նախերգանք (Overture, 1943)

=== Band ===
- Սգո քայլերգ Թումանյանի հիշատակին (Funeral March in memory of Tumanyan, 1923)
- Շտուրմ-քայլերգ (Sturm-March, 1933)

=== Film scores ===
- «Կարո» (Karo, 1936)
- «Քաջ Նազար» (Brave Nazar, 1940)
- «Շունն ու կատուն» (The dog and the cat, 1936)
- «Տերտերն ու այծը» (The Priest and the Goat, 1939)

=== Incidental music ===
- Մեծապատիվ մուրացկաններ (Honorable Beggars, 1933)
- Շահնամե (Proclamation, 1935)
- Սկաուտ (The Scout, 1935)
- Երկիր հայրենի (Fatherland, 1936)
- Նամուս (Honor, 1936)
- Քաջ Նազար (Brave Nazar, 1941)
- Արևելյան ատամնաբոյժ (Oriental Dentist, 1942)
- Խաթաբալա (Bewildered, 1944)
- Մեծ հարսանիք (Big Wedding, 1946)
- Հարազատ մարդիկ (Genuine People, 1947)

=== Choral ===
- Սովետական Միության հիմնը (Soviet National Anthem, 1943)
- Հայկական ՍՍՀ հիմնը (Soviet Armenian National Anthem, 1944)
