= Shor and Shorshor =

1926 film

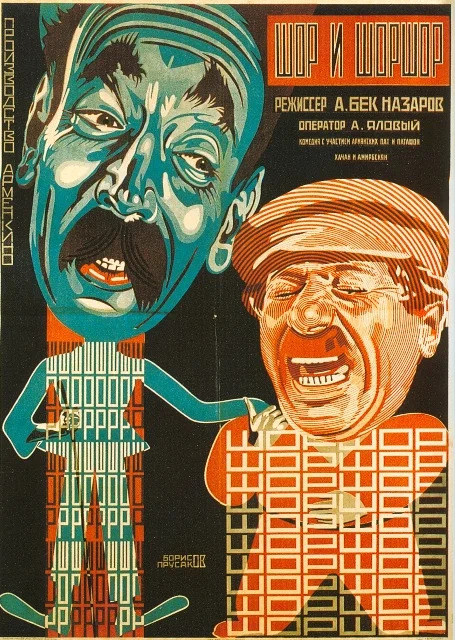
- Directed by: Hamo Beknazarian
- Written by: M. Bagratuni; Hamo Beknazarian
- Starring: Hambartsum Khachanyan; A. Amirbekyan; Nina Manucharyan; Avet Avetisyan; Grigor Avetyan
- Cinematography: Garosh Bek-Nazaryan; Arkadi Yalovoy
- Production company: Armenkino
- Release date: 1926
- Running time: 55 minutes
- Country: Soviet Union
- Language: Silent (Russian intertitles)

Shor and Shorshor is a 1926 Soviet comedy film directed by Hamo Beknazarian. Other title: "Armenian Pat & Patachon". Based on a story by M. Bagratuni.

== Plot ==
The film tells of the adventures of rural slackers Shor and Shorshor. Their wives kick them out of the house (without collusion) and tell them that they will be able to return home only when they get hold of food, but the friends use the superstitious villagers only for procuring alcohol.

== Cast ==
- Hambartsum Khachanyan as Shor
- A. Amirbekyan as Shorshor
- Nina Manucharyan as Yeghso
- Avet Avetisyan as Vardan
- Grigor Avetyan as Miller
- B. Muradyan as Ghukas
- Ye. Adamyan as Heriknaz
- O. Stepanyan as Kyokhva (village headman)
- Arkady Harutyunyan as Ohan (as A. Harutyunyan)
- T. Shamirkhanyan as Vahan
- David Malyan as Devil

== Production ==
The screenplay was written by Hamo Beknazarian in only one night, on the eleventh day of work the film was shot and edited. The director and the actors improvised on set. "Shor and Shorshor" was a huge success both in Armenia and abroad, bringing the studio "more than three hundred thousand ticket sales."
