= Hambartsum Khachanyan =

Armenian film actor

- Born: 13 February 1894; Trabzon, Ottoman Empire
- Died: 30 June 1944 (aged 50); Yerevan, Soviet Armenia
- Occupation: Actor
- Years active: 1926-1940

Hambartsum Misaki Khachanyan (Armenian: Համբարձում Միսակի Խաչանյան, 13 February 1894 - 30 June 1944) was an Armenian film actor.

== Filmography ==
- 1940 - Nazar the Brave
- 1939 - Sevani dzknorsnere
- 1935 - Pepo
- 1932 - Meksikakan diplomatner
- 1931 - Kikos
- 1928 - Evil Spirit
- 1928 - Khaspush
- 1928 - Hinge khndzorin
- 1927 - Zare
- 1926 - Shor and Shorshor
- 1925 - Namus
