= Murad Kostanyan =

Armenian actor

- Մուրադ Կոստանյան
- Born: 25 August 1902; Salmas, Qajar Iran
- Died: 3 January 1989 (aged 86); Yerevan, Armenian SSR, Soviet Union
- Occupation: Actor
- Awards: People's Artist of the Armenian SSR

Murad Kostani Kostanyan (Armenian: Մուրադ Կոստանյան; 25 August 1902 – 3 January 1989) was an Armenian actor, People's Artist of Armenia (1956).

== Biography ==
From 1920 to 1925 and from 1927 to 1928 he studied at Moscow Armenian Theatral Studio. From 1925 to 1927 he was an actor of Tbilisi Armenian Theatre. He is one of the founders of Leninakan Drama theatre after Mravian. In 1930 he became an actor of the Sundukyan State Academic Theatre of Yerevan where he worked until his death. He played more than 1500 roles.

Kostanyan also starred in films, including Dzakhord Panose (1980), Harsnatsun hyusisits (1975) and 01-99 (1959).

== Links ==
- Biography
