= Hovhannes Abelian =

Armenian actor

Hovhannes Abelian PAA
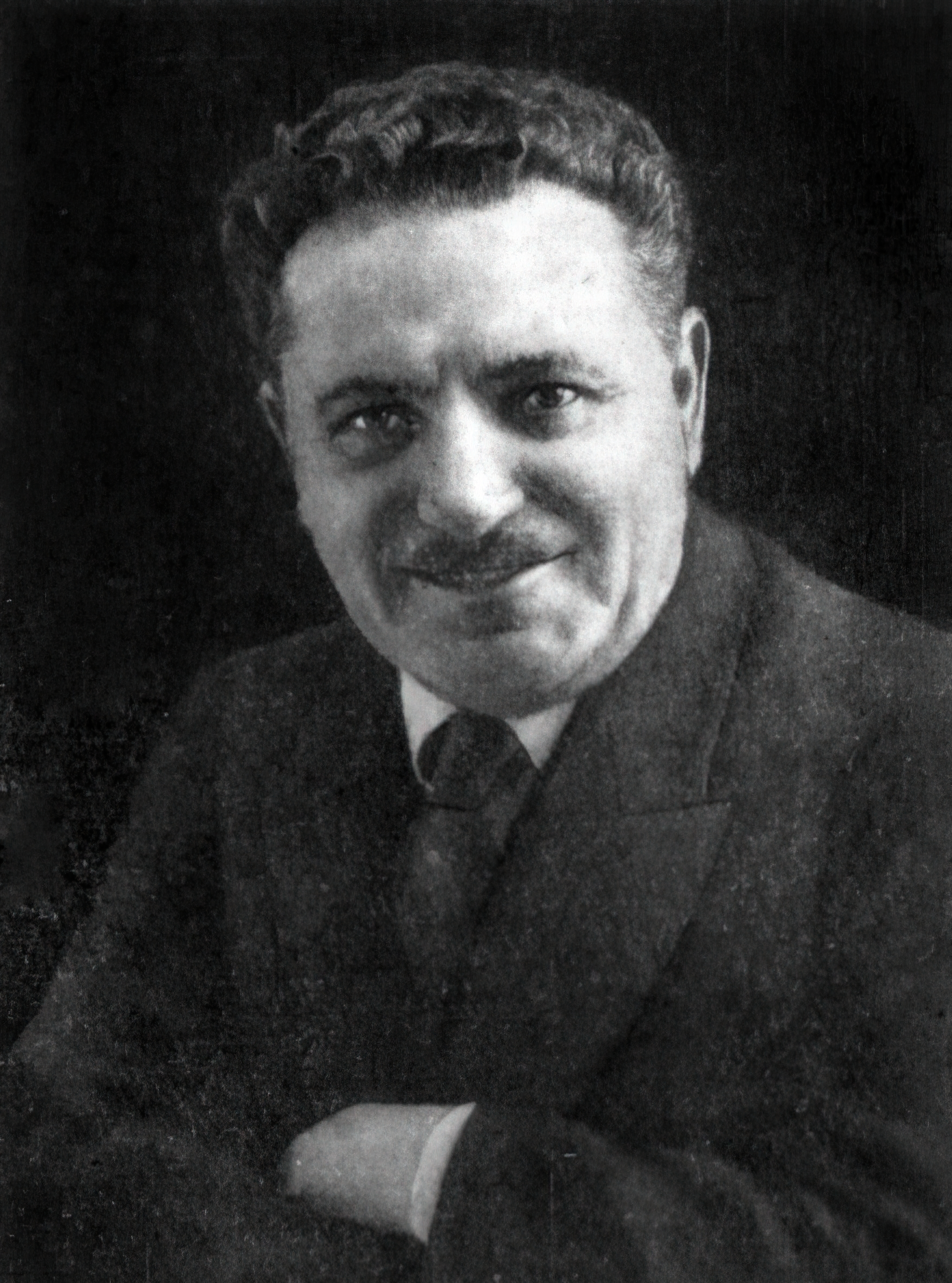
- Hovhannes Abelian
- Born: Hovhannes Harutyuni Abelian; October 23, 1865; Shamakhi, Baku Governorate, Russian Empire
- Died: July 1, 1936 (aged 70); Yerevan, Soviet Armenia
- Occupation: actor
- Awards: People's Artist of the Armenian SSR (1925)

Hovhannes Harutyuni Abelian (Armenian: Հովհաննես Աբելյան, October 23, 1865, Shamakhi, Baku Governorate, Russian Empire - July 1, 1936, Yerevan, Soviet Armenia) was an Armenian actor, People's Artist of the Armenian SSR (1925).

== Biography ==
From 1882, he worked in Armenian and Russian theatres of Baku and Tiflis. In 1908, he became the founder of "Abelian-Armenian Theatral Group", and realised artistic tours in different countries (Russia, Iran, Germany, France, USA). In 1925, Abelian entered to the Armenian State Theatre, and played in the cinema ("Namus", 1925). A realistic-style actor, he played more than 300 roles.

== Sources ==
- Armenian Concise Encyclopedia, Ed. by acad. K. Khudaverdian, Yerevan, 1990, p. 11
- "Աբելյան Հովհաննես". Հայկական Հանրագիտարան.
