= Avet Avetisyan =

Soviet actor

- Ավետ Ավետիսյան
- Born: Avet Markosi Voskanyan; March 21, 1878; Tbilisi, Russian Empire (now Georgia)
- Died: March 29, 1971 (aged 73); Yerevan, Armenian SSR, Soviet Union
- Occupation: Actor
- Years active: 1925 – 1970

Avet Markosi Avetisyan (Note: Armenian: Ավետ Մարկոսի Ավետիսյան, romanized: Avet Markosi Avetisyan) (24 November [O.S. 12 November] 1897 – March 29, 1971, born Voskanyan) (Note: Armenian: Ոսկանյան, romanized: Oskanyan) was a Soviet Armenian film actor.

== Biography ==
In 1905, Avetisyan was accepted to the Nersisian School, where he participated in school plays. Before leaving for the army (in 1916), Avetisyan worked in a manufacturing shop as a student and clerk. After being discharged from the military (in 1918) he joined Hovhannes Abelyan's theater company in Baku. Avetisyan's debut performance occurred in 1918 as Voskan in Alexander Shirvanzade's Evil Spirit (Char Vogi). Avetisyan went to Tbilisi with Abelyan, where he performed in an Armenian drama group (1919). During 1920-1921, Avetisyan performed with the Amo Kharazyan group in Karakilisa (modern Vanadzor). In 1922, Avetisyan moved to Yerevan as part of the touring theatre before being accepted to the famous Sundukyan State Academic Theatre, where he continued to write for the rest of his life. Avetisyan acted in 28 Armenian movies. Avetisyan is buried in the Komitas Pantheon.

== Theatre Credits ==
- Pantalone in Carlo Goldoni's "Maid of Two Households" (1923)
- Zemlyanika in Nikolai Gogol's "Revisor" (1923)
- Orgon in Molière's "Tartuffe" (1924)
- Sako in Derenik Demirchian's "Nazar the Brave" (1924)
- Matvey Yegorich in Vrtanes Papazian's "Boulder"
- Zambakhov in Gabriel Sundukian's "Khatabala" (1927)
- Parsigh in Gabriel Sundukian's "The Destroyed Home" (1938)
- Sarkis in Gabriel Sundukian's "Another Victim" (1944)
- Pepo in Gabriel Sundukian's "Pepo" (1929, 1935, 1948)
- Mikitan in Perch Proshyan's "Bread's Problem" (1937)
- Shprikh in Mikhail Lermontov's "Masquerade" (1949)
- Dostigayev in Maxim Gorky's "Dostigayev and Others" (1934)
- Saghatel in Alexander Shirvanzade's "For the Sake of Honour" (1939)
- Marutkhanyan in Alexander Shirvanzade's "Chaos" (1959)
- Shvandya in Konstantin Trenyov's "Lyubov Yarovaya"
- Berest in Oleksandr Korniychuk's "Platon Kretchet"
- Shadrin in Nikolai Pogodin's "Man With a Gun" (1938)
- Kutuzov in Vladimir Solovyov's "Field Marshal Kutuzov" (1942)
- Sahag Svata in Muratsan's "Gevorg Marzpetuni" (1941)
- Globa in K. Simonov's "Russian People" (1942)
- Shulga in Mikhail Sholokhov's "Young Guard" (1947)
- Grinyov in Anatoly Sofronov's "Moscow's Mood" (1949)
- Moshig in Yeghishe Charents' "Towards the Future" (1960)
- Robinson in Alexander Ostrovsky's "The Poor Bride" (1946)
- Yepikhodov in Anton Chekhov's "Cherry Park" (1951)

== Filmography ==
- Namus (1925)
- Zare (1925)
- Shor and Shorshor (1926)
- Khaspush (1927)
- Golkhozain Karoon (1929)
- Gime Hertabah (1930)
- Kikos (1931)
- Krter-Yeztiner (1932)
- Gikor (1934)
- Pepo (1935)
- Karo (1937)
- Zangezur (1938)
- Lernain Arshav (1939)
- Nazar the Brave (1940)
- Hayrenaseri Endanike (1941)
- Toosdre (1942)
- David Bek (1943)
- Anahit (1947)
- Araradian Tasdi Aghchige (1949)
- Badvi Hamar (1956)
- Inchoo e Aghmgoom Kede (1958)
- Ploozoom (1959)
- Northern Rainbow (1960)
- Sayat-Nova (1960)
- Monsieur Jacques and Others (1964)
- An Explosion After Midnight (1969)
- Adam and Heva (1969)
- Morgan's Relative (1970)

== Awards and honours ==
- 1938 - People's Artist of the Armenian SSR
- 1941 - Stalin Prize, 2nd Degree, for his role as the Commander in Zangezur
- 1956 - Order of Lenin
- 1962 - People's Artist of the USSR
- 1971 - USSR State Prize
- 3 other honours and medals

== Documentaries ==
- Avet Avetisyan (1966)
