= Patvakan Barkhudaryan =

- Born: August 31, 1898; Stepanavan
- Died: January 13, 1948 (aged 49); Yerevan
- Occupation: film director

Patvakan Barkhudaryan (Armenian: Պատվական Անդրեյի Բարխուդարյան) was an Armenian film director and a People's Artist of the Armenian SSR (1940)

== Filmography ==
- The Savur Grave (1926) (as actor)
- Evil Spirit (1927)
- Funeral of A. Spendiarov (1928)
- Five Right in the Target (1928)
- The Sixteenth (1928)
- Under the Black Wing (1930)
- Kikos (1931)
- Two Nights (1932)
- Kurds-Yezids (1932)
- A Child of Sun (1933)
- Mountain Stream (1939)
- Armenian Film-Concert (1941)
- The Guardsman's Wife (1943)
- Second Armenian Film-Concert (1946)
