= Amasi Martirosyan =

Armenian filmmaker

- Ամասի Մարտիրոսյան
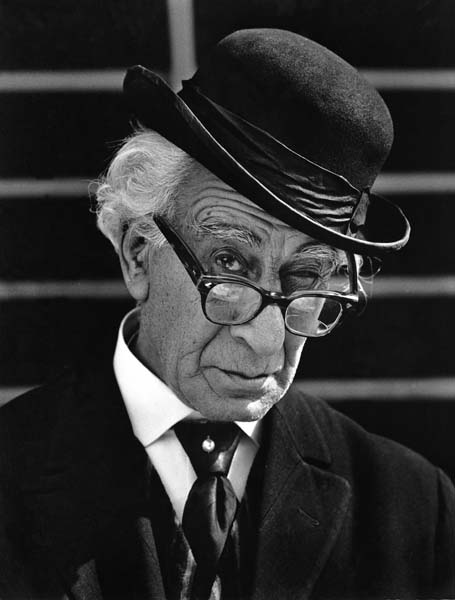
- Born: 18 April 1897; Erivan, Erivan Governorate, Russian Empire
- Died: 21 December 1971 (aged 74); Yerevan, Armenian SSR, Soviet Union
- Occupations: Film director, scriptwriter and actor
- Years active: 1925–1963

Amasi Martirosyan (Armenian: Ամասի Պետրոսի Մարտիրոսյան) was an Armenian film director, screenwriter and actor.

== Filmography ==
=== As actor ===
- Namus (1925) as Smbat
- Zare (1927) as Zurba
- Khaspush (1928) as Mulla
- Zangezur (1938) as Dashnak officer
- The Song of First Love (1958) as Guard

=== As assistant director ===
- Khaspush (1928)
- Evil Spirit (1928)
- David Bek (1944)
- Anahit (1947)
