= Hasmik (actress) =

Soviet and Armenian actress

Hasmik Aсмик
- Born: Taguhi Hakobyan; 21 March 1879; Nakhchivan, Russian Empire
- Died: 23 August 1947 (aged 69); Yerevan, Soviet Armenia
- Occupation: Actress
- Years active: 1906–1947

Hasmik (Armenian: Հասմիկ) (born Taguhi Hakobyan (Armenian: Թագուհի Հակոբյան), 21 March 1879 – 23 August 1947) was a Soviet and Armenian actress.

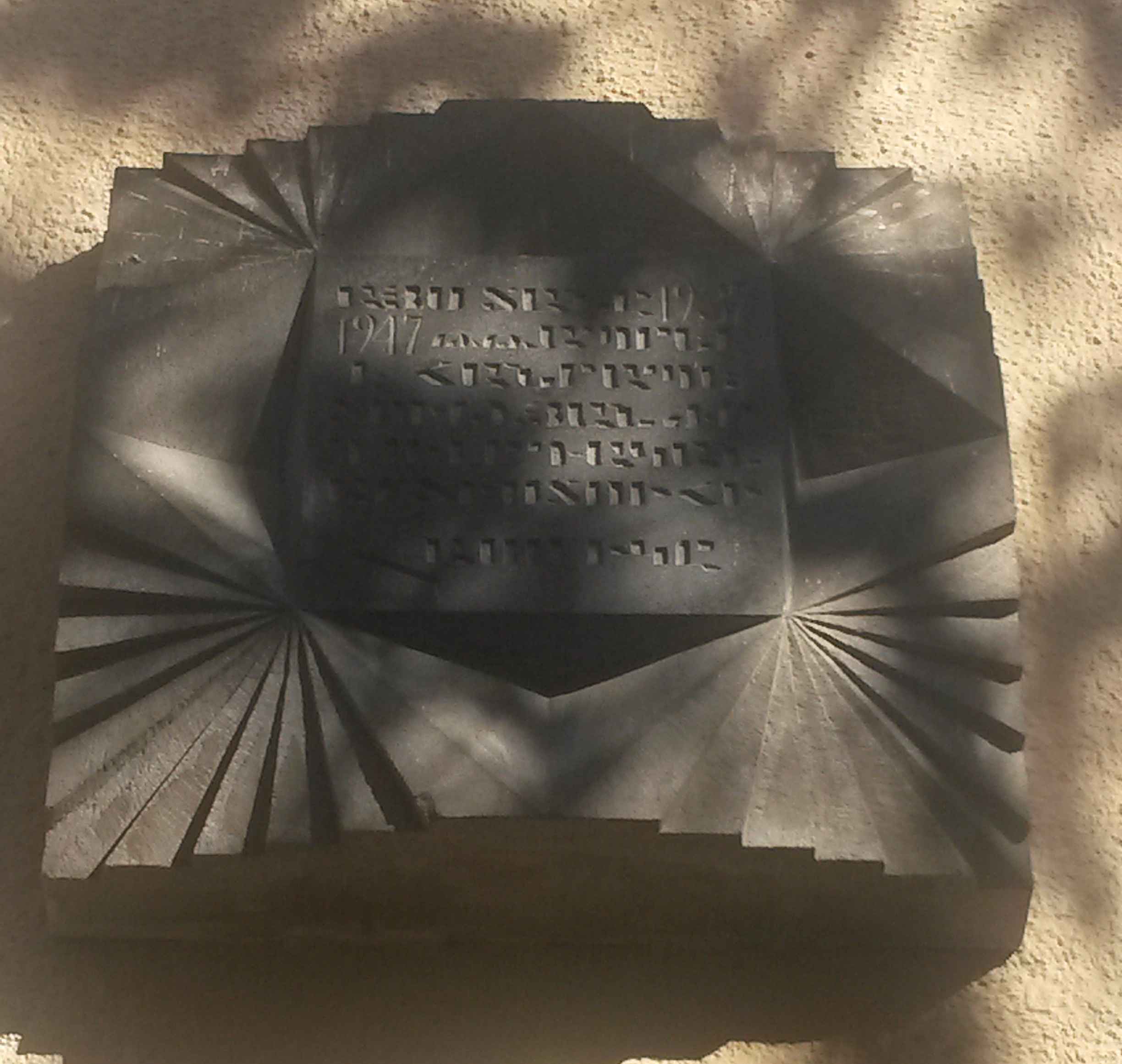

== Awards ==
- People's Artist of the Armenian SSR (1935)
- Hero of Labour (1936)
- Order of the Red Banner of Labour (1945)

== Partial filmography ==
- Evil Spirit (1927)
- Gikor (1934)
- Pepo (1935)
- Zangezur (1938)
- David Bek (1944)
