= Hamo Beknazarian =

Soviet American film director

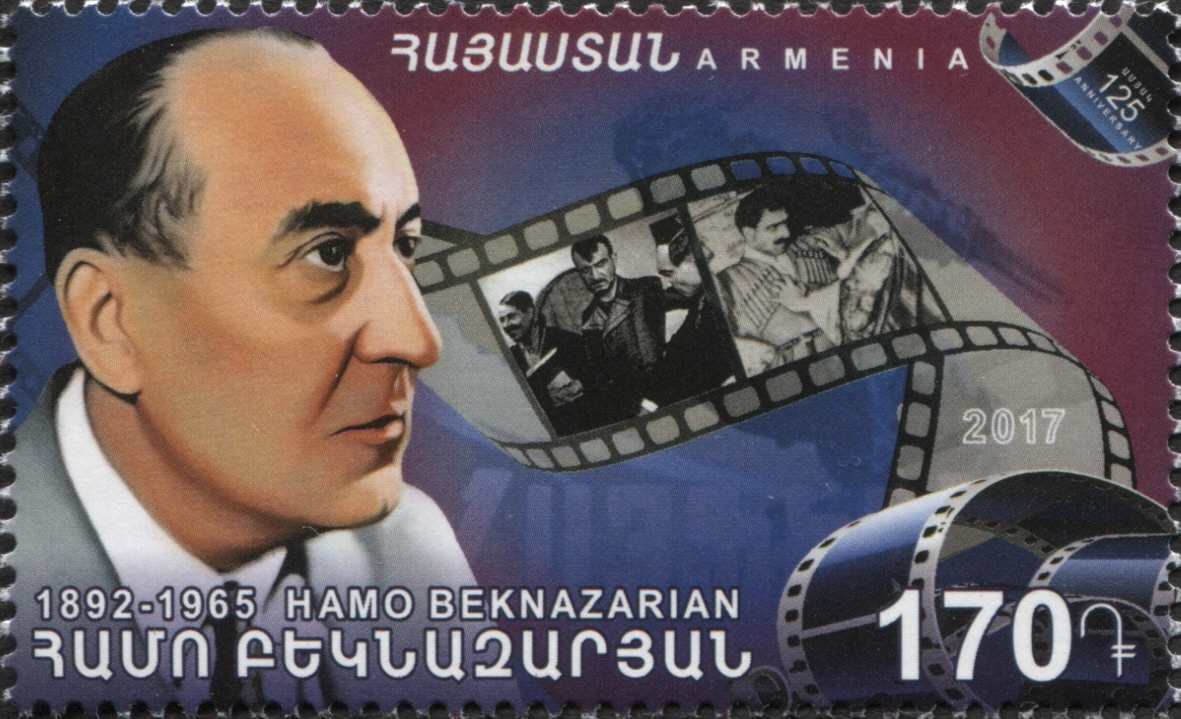
- Hamo Beknazarian on a 2017 stamp of Armenia
- Born: Ambartsum Beknazaryan; 19 May 1891; Yerevan, Russian Empire
- Died: 27 April 1965 (aged 73); Moscow, Russian SFSR, Soviet Union
- Resting place: Moscow Armenian Cemetery
- Occupations: Film director; actor; screenwriter
- Awards: Stalin Prize

Hamo Beknazarian (Armenian: Համո Բեկնազարյան; Russian: Амбарцум Бек-Назаров; 19 May 1891 – 27 April 1965), also known as Hamo Bek-Nazarov or Amo Bek-Nazarian, was an Armenian film director, actor, and screenwriter.

== Biography ==
Hamo Beknazarian was born on 19 May 1891 in Yerevan, Russian Empire (now the capital of Armenia). His career in cinema started in 1914, when a casual acquaintance offered him a part in a film. Since that part, he decided to pursue a career in cinema. Between 1914 and 1918, he played about 70 parts, becoming a popular actor in pre-Revolutionary Russian film. In 1920, instead of going to Armenia as he had decided, he went to Tbilisi where he developed a film department for the Georgian Commissioner's office of Public Education. He shot many films in Tbilisi, including Patricide and Lost Treasures. In 1925, he shot his first Armenian film and moved to Armenia. In 1933, he shot the first Armenian sound film Pepo. In 1941, Beknazarian was awarded the Stalin Prize. Besides feature films, he also shot a few documentaries.

Hamo Beknazarian died on 27 April 1965 in Moscow, USSR.

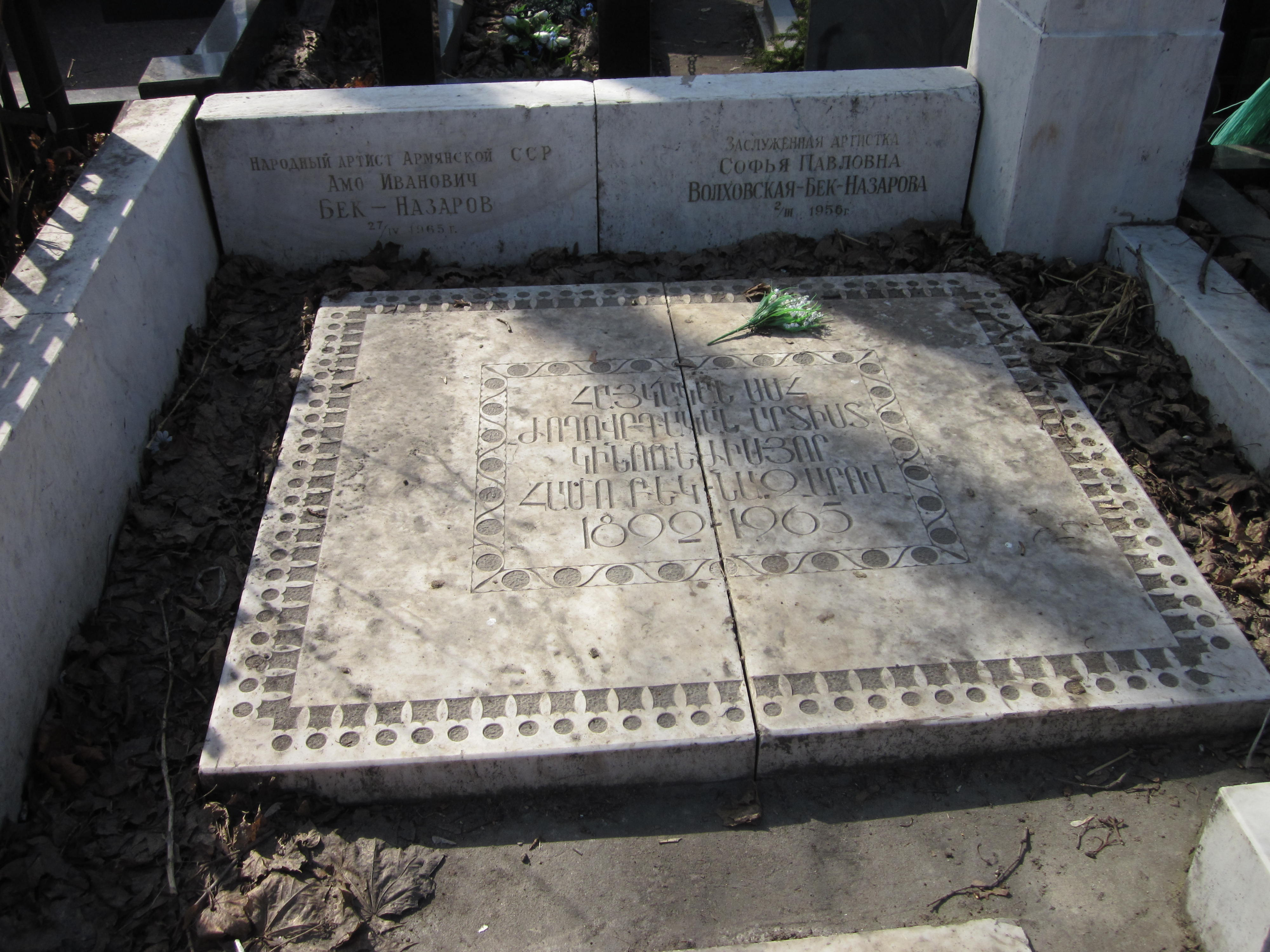
Hamo Beknazaryan's grave in Armenian Cemetery of Moscow

== Filmography ==
- 1922: The Suram Fortress, actor
- 1923: Patricide, director
- 1925: Namus, scriptwriter, director
- 1925: The Case of Tariel Mklavadze's Murder, director
- 1926: Natela, director
- 1926: Shor and Shorshor, scriptwriter, director
- 1927: Zare, scriptwriter, director
- 1928: Khaspush, co-scriptwriter, director
- 1928: The House on the Volcano, co-scriptwriter, director
- 1943: David-Bek, co-scriptwriter, director
- 1935: Pepo, scriptwriter, director
- 1938: Zangezur, co-scriptwriter, director
- 1947: Anahit, director
