= Hrachia Nersisyan =

Soviet actor

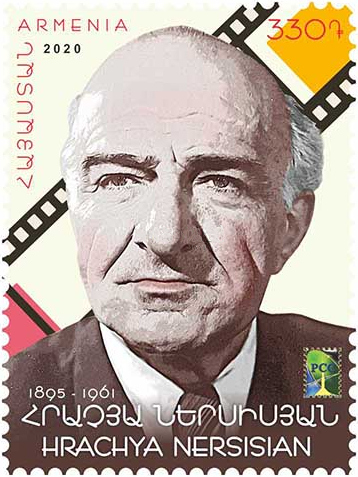
- Born: November 24, 1895
- Died: November 8, 1961 (aged 65)
- Resting place: Komitas Pantheon
- Occupations: Actor, director

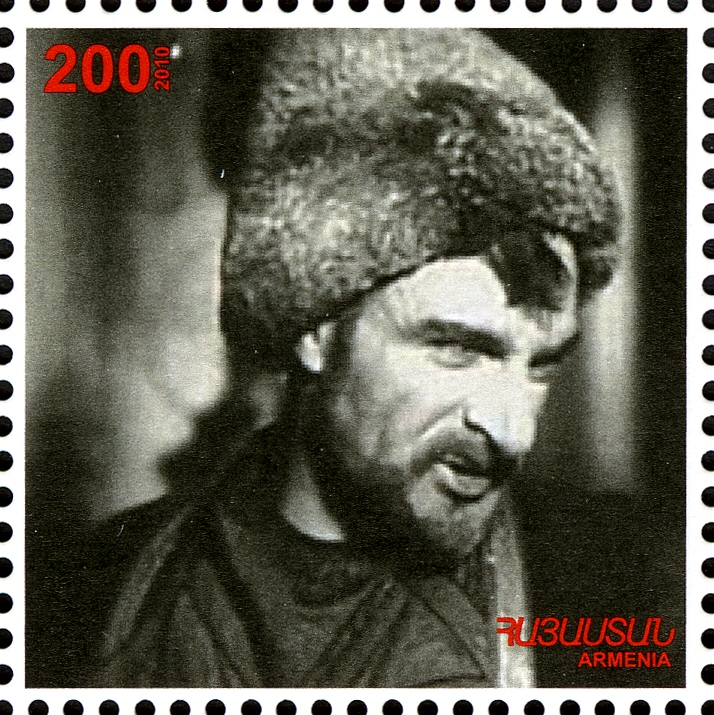
Nersisyan in Pepo, 2011 Armenian stamp

Hrachia Nersisyan (Armenian: Հրաչյա Ներսիսյան, 24 November 1895 – 6 November 1961) was a Soviet-Armenian film actor. He was honoured with title of People's Artist of the USSR in 1956.

Nersisyan was born in Nicomedia, Ottoman Empire (modern-day İzmit, Turkey) and studied in Constantinople. He moved to the Soviet Union in 1923, and soon became a film actor.

Nersisyan's first credit was in Namus, a 1925 silent movie. Later credits include Pepo (1935), Zangezur (1938) (won Stalin Prize in 1941), David Bek (1944), The Song of First Love (1958) and Tjvjik (1961). Hrachiya Nersisyan continued acting until the end of his life. His work spanned over two dozen films, including several released posthumously.

Hrachia Nersisyan is buried at Komitas Pantheon in Yerevan city center.
