= Anahit (disambiguation) =

Anahit is goddess of fertility and healing, wisdom and water in Iranian and Armenian mythology.

Anahit or Anahid may also refer to:

== Arts and entertainment ==
- Anahit (fairy tale), an 1881 Armenian fairy tale
  - Anahit (1947 film), an adaptation of the fairy tale directed by Hamo Beknazarian
  - Anahit (2014 film), an animated adaptation of the fairy tale directed by Davit Sahakyants
- Anahit, a 1965 composition by Giacinto Scelsi

== Other uses ==
- Anahit (name)
- Anahita or Anahit, a Persian goddess
- Anahid, a supplement of the Lebanese-Armenian daily Aztag

== See also ==
- Anahita (disambiguation)
- Anahid Literary Prize, an Armenian literary prize, awarded to Arthur Nersesian in 2005
- Anahidrano, a town and commune in Madagascar
- "Anahid's Musings Op. 147", a 2006 work for two pianos and percussion by Dianne Goolkasian Rahbee
