= Anahit (name) =

Anahit (Persian: آناهید, in Armenian Անահիտ) (in Western Armenian transliteration and pronunciation Anahid) is goddess of fertility and healing, wisdom and water in Iranian and Armenian mythology.

Anahita is a Persian goddess, known also by the spellings Anahit/Anahid.

Anahit and variant Anahid is a common given name for Iranian and Armenian females, and may refer to:

== Anahid ==
(in Western Armenian given names)

- Anahid Ajemian (1924–2016), Armenian-American violinist
- Anahid Fayad (born 1983), Syrian-born Palestinian-Jordanian actress
- Anaid Iplicjian (born 1935), German-Armenian actress
- Anahid Nersessian, American writer and critic
- Anahide Ter Minassian (1929–2019), French-Armenian historian

== Anahit ==
(in Eastern Armenian given names)

- Anahit Bakhshyan (born 1947), Armenian politician and MP
- Anahit or Ana Kasparian (born 1986), American political pundit
- Anahit Maschyan (1900–1989), Armenian theatre and film actress
- Anahit Nersesyan (born 1954), Armenian pianist
- Anahit Perikhanian (1928–2012), Armenian Iranologist
- Anahit Sahinyan (1917–2010), Armenian writer
- Anahit Tsitsikian (1926–1999), Armenian violinist
- Anahit Yulanda Varan (1917–2003), Turkish street performer of Armenian ethnicity

== See also ==
- Anahita (given name)
