= Anahita (disambiguation) =

Anahita is an Iranian goddess.

Anahita may also refer to:

- Anahit, an Armenian goddess
- Anahita (given name)
- Anahita (spider), a genus of spider
- 270 Anahita, a minor planet designation: 270 Anahita

== See also ==
- Anahit (disambiguation)
- Anahata (disambiguation)
- Anaïs (disambiguation)
- Nahid (disambiguation)
- Nahida
- Temple of Anahita (disambiguation)
