= Nahid (disambiguation) =

Nahid is the Persian name for the Iranian goddess Anahita.

Nahid may also refer to:

- Nahid (film), 2015 Iranian film
- Nahid (magazine), Ottoman magazine
- Nahid-1, Iranian satellite

== People with the given name ==
- Nahid Afrin (born 2001), Indian singer
- Nahid Angha (born 1945), American Sufi scholar
- Nahid Bhadelia, American physician
- Nahid Hasan (born 1988), Indian politician
- Nahid Islam (born 1998), Bangladeshi student leader
- Nahid Kulenović (1929–1969), Croatian politician
- Nahid Majid, (born 1964) British civil servant
- Nahid Persson Sarvestani (born 1960), Swedish filmmaker
- Nahid al-Rayyis (1937–2010), Palestinian politician
- Nahid Shahmehri (born 1952), Swedish professor of Computer Science
- Nahid Toubia (born 1951), Sudanese surgeon and women's health rights activist

== People with the surname ==
- Nurul Islam Nahid (born 1945), Bangladeshi politician

== See also ==
- Anahita (disambiguation)
- Nahida
