= Anahit (fairy tale) =

1881 Armenian fairy tale

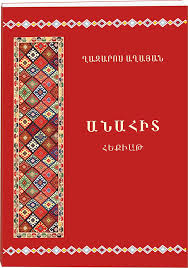
The cover of the Anahit fairy tale.

Anahit (Անահիտ) is a popular Armenian literary fairy tale written by Ghazaros Aghayan in 1881. It has been adapted for two films and has been analyzed by scholars.

== Plot ==
Anahit is a virtuous, gifted shepherd's daughter living in a remote village. Her many fine points cause Armenian prince Vachagan to fall in love with her and propose marriage. However, she turns him down because she wants a husband with a trade. So he spends a year learning to become a weaver, and then she marries him.

Later Vachagan is captured by a priest. The heathen priest kills all of his prisoners except for those who have a craft and can therefore be useful to him. Vachagan weaves a carpet for him and persuades him to sell it to Anahit. He does so, not knowing that she is Vachagan's wife. She finds and reads the secret message Vachagan has weaved into the carpet, rescues him and imprisons the priest.

== Adaptations ==
Among its stage adaptations was one in Tabriz in 1902.

The tale is also the basis of two films.

Anahit is a 1947 67-minute-long black-and-white film directed by Hamo Beknazarian and starring Metaksia Simonyan as Anahit and Hrachia Nersisyan as Vachagan. It was produced by Yerevan Film Studio and premiered on 2 December 1947.

The animated film Anahit debuted on 27 December 2014. It took five years to produce and used "traditional drawing animation technology and 3D graphics." The production took some liberties with the source, including a magician and modern inventions such as a mobile phone, a computer and a subway. One scholarly journal article described it as "the most notable and widely viewed cartoon of Armenian's [sic] post-independence era."

== Analysis ==
The tale has been the subject of scholarly analysis.
