= Aghvan =

- Pronunciation: Armenian: [ɑʁˈvɑn]
- Gender: Male
- Language: Armenian

Origin
- Meaning: "[Caucasian] Albanian"
- Region of origin: Armenia

Aghvan (Armenian: Աղվան (reformed); Աղուան (classical)) is an Armenian masculine given name. It stems from the name of the Caucasian Albanians. It is used throughout the Caucasus, although very rare. It is the source of the last name Aghvanyan.

Notable people with the name include:

- Aghvan Chatinyan (born 1927), Armenian mountain climber
- Aghvan Grigoryan (born 1969), Armenian weightlifter
- Aghvan Hovsepyan (born 1953), Armenian lawyer
- Aghvan Mkrtchyan (born 1981), Armenian footballer
- Aghvan Papikyan (born 1994), Polish-born Armenian footballer
- Aghvan Vardanyan (born 1958), Armenian politician
