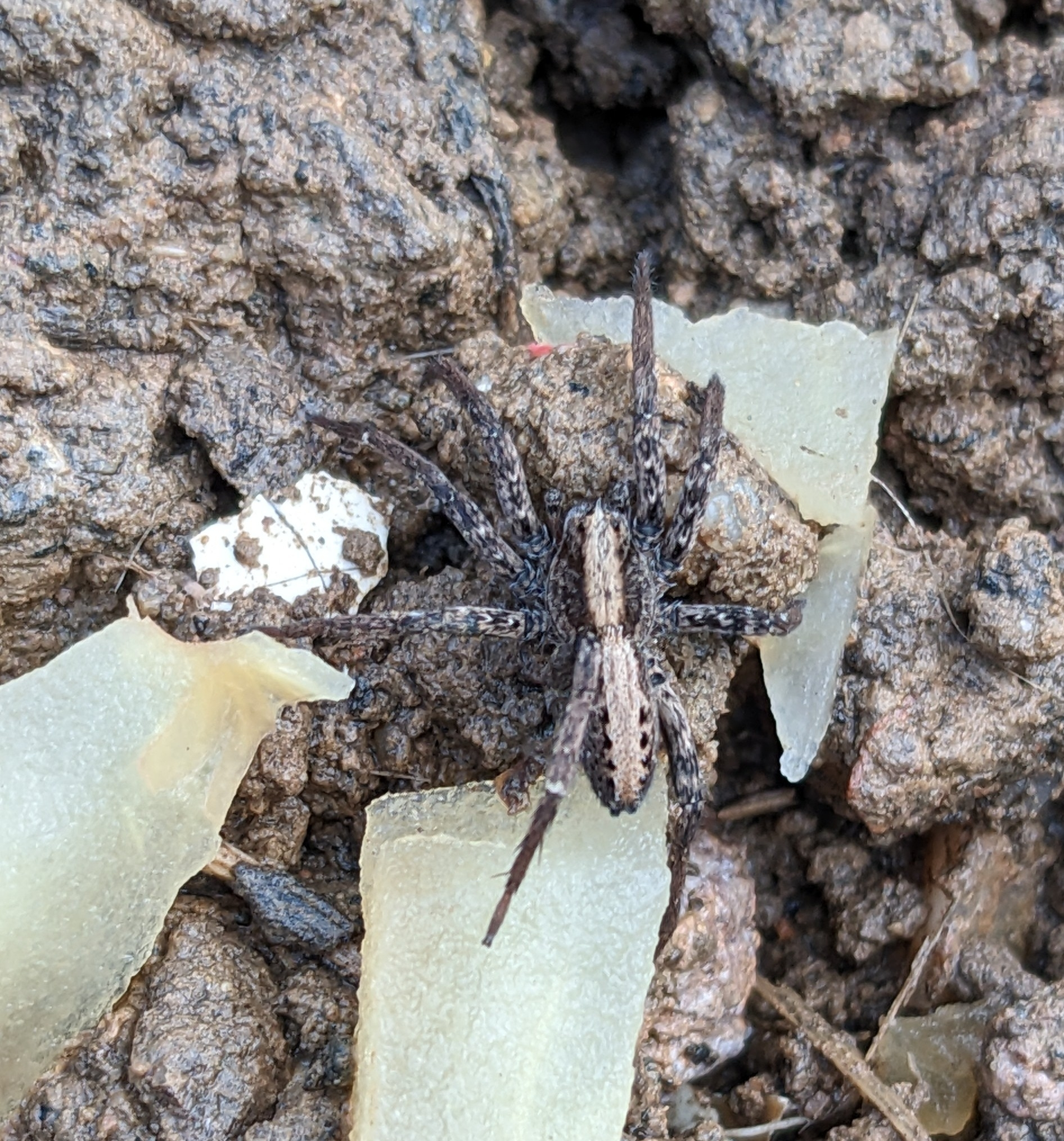
- A. maolan from Hong Kong

Scientific classification
- Kingdom: Animalia
- Phylum: Arthropoda
- Subphylum: Chelicerata
- Class: Arachnida
- Order: Araneae
- Infraorder: Araneomorphae
- Family: Ctenidae
- Genus: Anahita
- Species: A. maolan

Binomial name
- Anahita maolan Zhu, Chen & Song, 1999

= Anahita maolan =

Species of spider

Anahita maolan is a species of spider in the family Ctenidae. It was first described from Guizhou Province, China in 1999.

The species name is derived from the name of Maolan (茂兰) Nature Reserve in Guizhou Province, China.

== Distribution ==
A. maolan is known from southern China (Guizhou and Hunan Provinces) and Taiwan. The species was originally described from specimens collected in the Maolan Nature Reserve in Guizhou Province. It was subsequently recorded from Hunan Province and Taiwan, where it was found in Kenting National Park.

== Description ==
A. maolan is a medium-sized spider with notable sexual dimorphism in size. Males have a total length of approximately 10.9–11.5 mm, while females are larger at 8.9–12.8 mm.

=== Female ===
Females are generally larger than males, with a carapace length of 4.9–6.4 mm and width of 4.2–5.45 mm. The carapace is dark brown with a broad yellow median band and irregular lateral bands. The abdomen displays a light brown coloration with a longitudinal yellow band.

The epigyne features a large, trapezoidal septum that is slightly longer than wide. The copulatory openings are located above the epigynal teeth, and the receptacles are elongate and not well separated from the copulatory ducts.

=== Male ===
The male has a brown carapace measuring 4.7–5.65 mm in length and 3.5–4.5 mm in width, decorated with a broad yellow median band and lateral bands. The fovea is thin and dark colored. The abdomen is oval-shaped with a distinctive yellow longitudinal band running down the center, flanked by gray-brown areas. The posterior portion of the central band is marked by four pairs of black spots on each side.

The pedipalps are distinctive, with the embolus being comparatively long and crescent-shaped, gradually tapering toward the tip. The tegular apophysis is large with a deep groove, and no conductor is present. The legs are yellowish-brown with indistinct darker spots, and the first pair of legs bears five pairs of ventral spines on the femur and three pairs on the patella.

== Taxonomy ==
A. maolan is closely related to Anahita jianfengensis, which was described from Hainan Island. However, A. maolan can be distinguished by its larger size, long crescent-like embolus, large conductor, and the distinctive shape of the sperm duct loop. The species also has a thick brush of hairs on the top of the tibia near the cymbium base, which is absent in A. jianfengensis.

There appears to be some morphological variation within the species, as specimens from different provinces show differences in epigynal structure, particularly in the shape of the septum and epigynal teeth.
