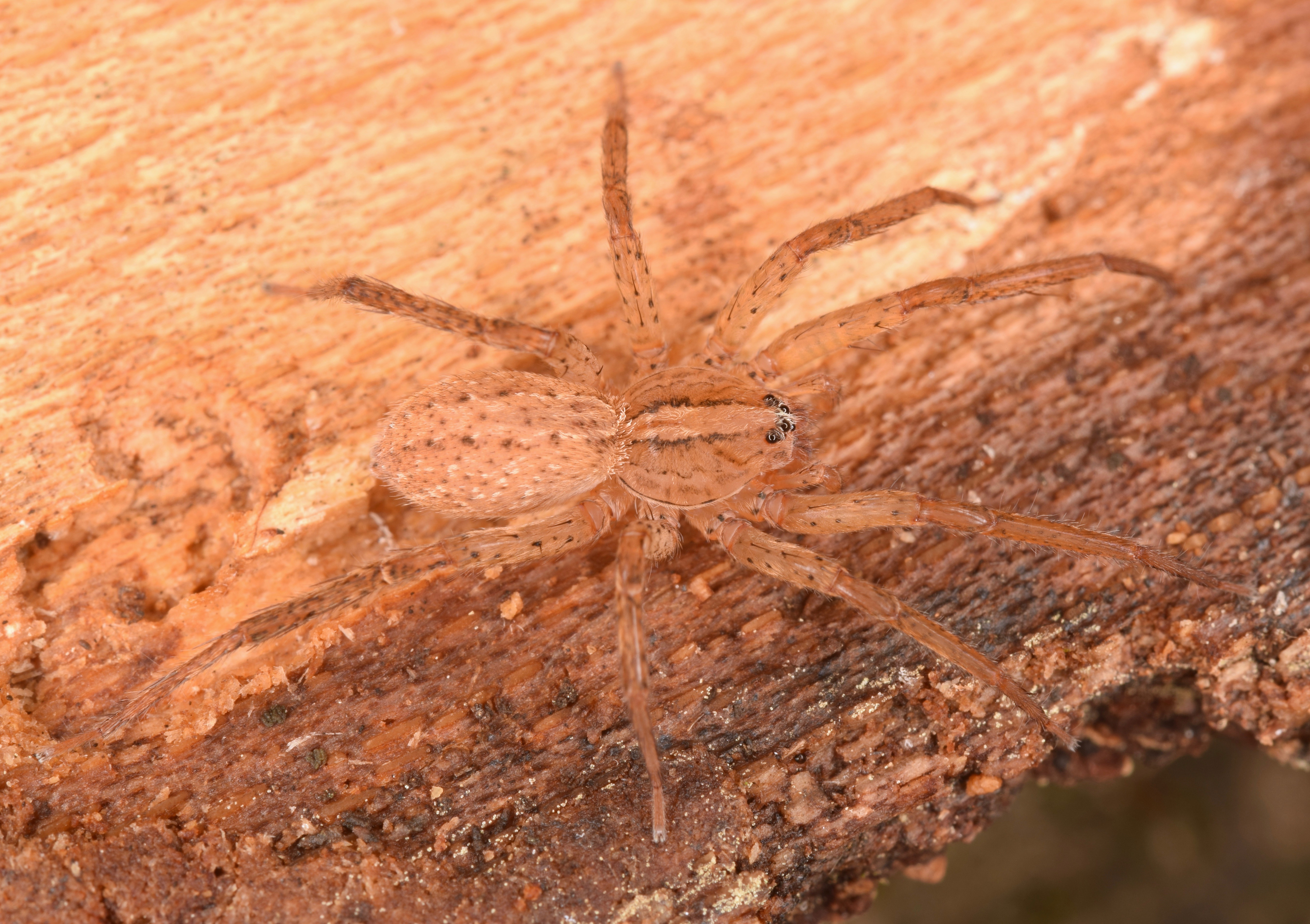

Conservation status
- Apparently Secure (NatureServe)

Scientific classification
- Kingdom: Animalia
- Phylum: Arthropoda
- Subphylum: Chelicerata
- Class: Arachnida
- Order: Araneae
- Infraorder: Araneomorphae
- Family: Ctenidae
- Genus: Anahita
- Species: A. punctulata

Binomial name
- Anahita punctulata (Hentz, 1844)

= Anahita punctulata =

Species of spider

Anahita punctulata, the southeastern wandering spider, is a species of wandering spider in the family Ctenidae. It is found in the USA.
