= Anahit Sahinyan =

Anahit Sahinyan (Armenian: Անահիտ Սահինյան) (June 20, 1917, Vardablur, Lori region, Armenia – January 7, 2010, Yerevan, Armenia) was an Armenian writer, journalist, editor, and translator.

== Biography ==
Anahit Sahinyan was born in Vardablur, Lori on June 20 ,1917. Later in her lifetime regarding her education, she would attend and graduate from the Yerevan State Construction/Engineering Technical School and the Yerevan State University from the Philology division in 1941.

Her first piece of writing, "Vayelk" was published in 1942. In addition, from 1942 up to 1958 she worked as the head of the children's literature section for the Armenian State Publicity. Following then, from the extent of 1969 until the 1980s, she was the designated editor of "Pioneer Kanch" magazine, where she was also able to translate for children's work published in various editions, and publicly write articles discussing state literary press agenda matters. Before and during her time as editor she also managed to produce several novels. Some of her most prominent novels include, Crossroads (1946), Thirst (1955) and Longing (1974). She is also known to have translated numerous other children's books besides the writings published in "Pioneer Kanch" magazine into Armenian.

She died on January 7, 2010, in Yerevan at the age of 92, with her funeral held on the 8th.

Many of her works today have been translated into Russian.

== Awards ==
- State Prize of USSR
