= Yuri Bakhshyan =

Armenian politician

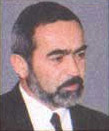

Deputy Speaker of National Assembly of Armenia
- In office 1998 – October 27, 1999
- Preceded by: Albert Bazeyan
- Succeeded by: Ruben Miroyan

Personal details
- Born: June 28, 1947 Goris, Armenian SSR, USSR
- Died: October 27, 1999 (aged 52) Yerevan, Armenia
- Cause of death: Assassination by firearm
- Spouse: Anahit Bakhshyan
- Children: 3
- Education: Yerevan State University

Yuri Bakhshyan (Armenian: Յուրի Բախշյան; June 28, 1947 in Goris – October 27, 1999 in Yerevan) was an Armenian politician, the Deputy Speaker of National Assembly of Armenia.

== Biography ==
Bakhshyan was born in 1947, in Goris. He finished the faculty of Physics of the Yerevan State University, then worked as senior scientist. He became Deputy speaker of the Armenian parliament in 1998 until his assassination with other eight politicians in parliament in the Armenian parliament shooting.

He had three children with his wife, Anahit Bakhshyan.

== Death ==
On October 27, 1999, he, along with Vazgen Sargsyan, Karen Demirchyan, Ruben Miroyan, Leonard Petrosyan, Henrik Abrahamyan, Armenak Armenakyan and Mikayel Kotanyan were shot and killed by Nairi Hunanyan, his brother Karen, their uncle Vram and two others, Derenik Ejanyan and Eduard Grigoryan - armed with AK-47 rifles hidden under long coats after the gunmen broke into the National Assembly building in Yerevan, while the government was holding a question-and-answer session.
