= Nahida =

Nahida may refer to:

- Nahida Akter (born 2000), Bangladeshi cricketer
- Nahida Khan (born 1986), Pakistani cricketer
- Nahida Ruth Lazarus (1849-1928), German–Jewish author and scholar
- Nahida Nakad (born 1960), Lebanese and Italian TV reporter and journalist
- Nahida Sobhan, Bangladeshi diplomat
- Nahida Touhami (born 1978), Algerian middle distance runner
- Nahida (Genshin Impact), a character in the 2020 video game Genshin Impact
- Nahida (butterfly), a genus of butterflies found in the Americas

== See also ==
- Anahita (disambiguation)
- Nahid (disambiguation)
