= Anahit (2014 film) =

2014 animated film

- Directed by: Davit Sahakyants
- Screenplay by: Davit Sahakyants; Naira Sahakyants; Lyulya Sahakyants
- Music by: Armen Martirosyan; Vardan Zadoyan
- Production company: Robert Sahakyants Production
- Release date: 27 December 2014
- Running time: 90 minutes
- Country: Armenia
- Language: Armenian

Anahit (Armenian: Անահիտ) is a 2014 Armenian traditionally animated fantasy film directed by Davit Sahakyants from a screenplay written by Davit, Naira, and Lyulya Sahakyants (who also acted as co-director). The screenplay was based on the 1881 fairytale of the same name by Ghazaros Aghayan. The soundtrack was composed by Armen Martirosyan and Vardan Zadoyan. Produced by Robert Sahakyants Production, Anahit was released in Armenian cinemas on 27 December 2014.

== Production ==
The film was funded by the Ministry of Culture of Armenia, and animated using traditional drawing animation combined with 3D computer-animation. In February 2013, there were 25 minutes left to animate. Director Davit Sahakyants stated that the financing provided the Ministry was enough for 20 minutes of animation per year. In February 2014, there were about 10–12 minutes left.

=== Music ===
The soundtrack was composed by Armen Martirosyan and Vardan Zadoyan. The songs were performed by Shushan Petrosyan, Inga Arshakyan, Tigran Petrosyan, Gor Sujyan, Nick Egibyan, Hasmik Karapetyan and the Akunk Folk Ensemble.

== Release ==
Anahit was released in Armenian cinemas on 27 December 2014. According to Agos, the film received 100,000 admissions in Armenia.

== See also ==
- List of Armenian films of 2014
