= Anahata (disambiguation) =

Anahata or Anahat may refer to:

- Anahata, the fourth primary chakra according to the Hindu Yogic and Tantric traditions
- Anahat Yoga, a type of Yoga
- Anahata (album), an album by the band June of 44
- Anahat (film), a 2003 Indian Marathi-language film by director Amol Palekar

== See also ==
- Anahita (disambiguation)
