= Anahit (1947 film) =

- Romanian film poster
- Directed by: Hamo Beknazarian
- Written by: Ghazaros Aghayan (fairy tale); Vladimir Shvejtser
- Starring: Hrachia Nersisyan; Avet Avetisyan; O. Buniatyan
- Cinematography: Ivan Dildaryan
- Music by: Ashot Satyan
- Production company: Yerevan Film Studio
- Release date: December 2, 1947 (Moscow)
- Running time: 66 min
- Country: Soviet Union
- Languages: Armenian, Russian

Anahit (Armenian: Անահիտ, Russian: Анаит, romanized: Anait) is a 1947 Armenian adventure film, based on the fairy tale "Anahit" by Ghazaros Aghayan (written in 1881). It was shot by the ArmenFilm, directed by Hamo Beknazarian and stars Hrachia Nersisyan, Avet Avetisyan, Metaksia Simonyan, Frunze Dovlatyan, and Ori Buniatyan. The film is black-and-white and in Armenian but it was dubbed into various languages. The music was composed by Ashot Satyan.

== Plot ==
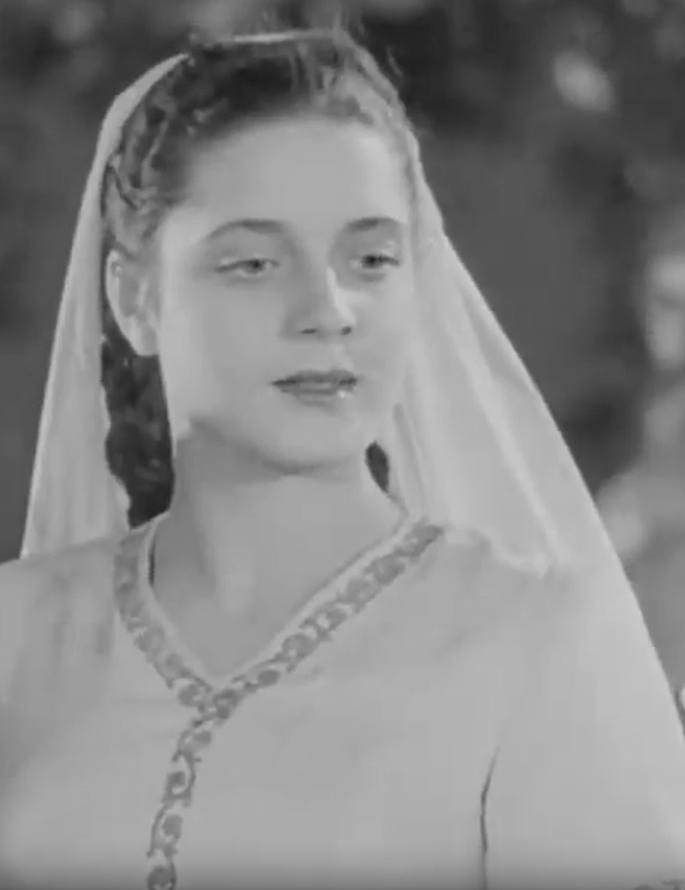
Metaksia Simonyan as Anahit

Young king Vachagan falls in love with a common girl, Anahit. He declines to marry the princess Feizula, the daughter of the neighbouring ruler, Nureddin. Instead Vachagan proposes marriage to Anahit, which she accepts on the condition that he learns a practical craft. Vachagan learns to weave, a skill that later saves his life after a tragic turn of events.

While the wedding takes place, Nureddin conspires with Feiruza to assassinate Vachagan, but the assassin's arrow strikes and kills Vachagan's mother, Queen Ashkhen.

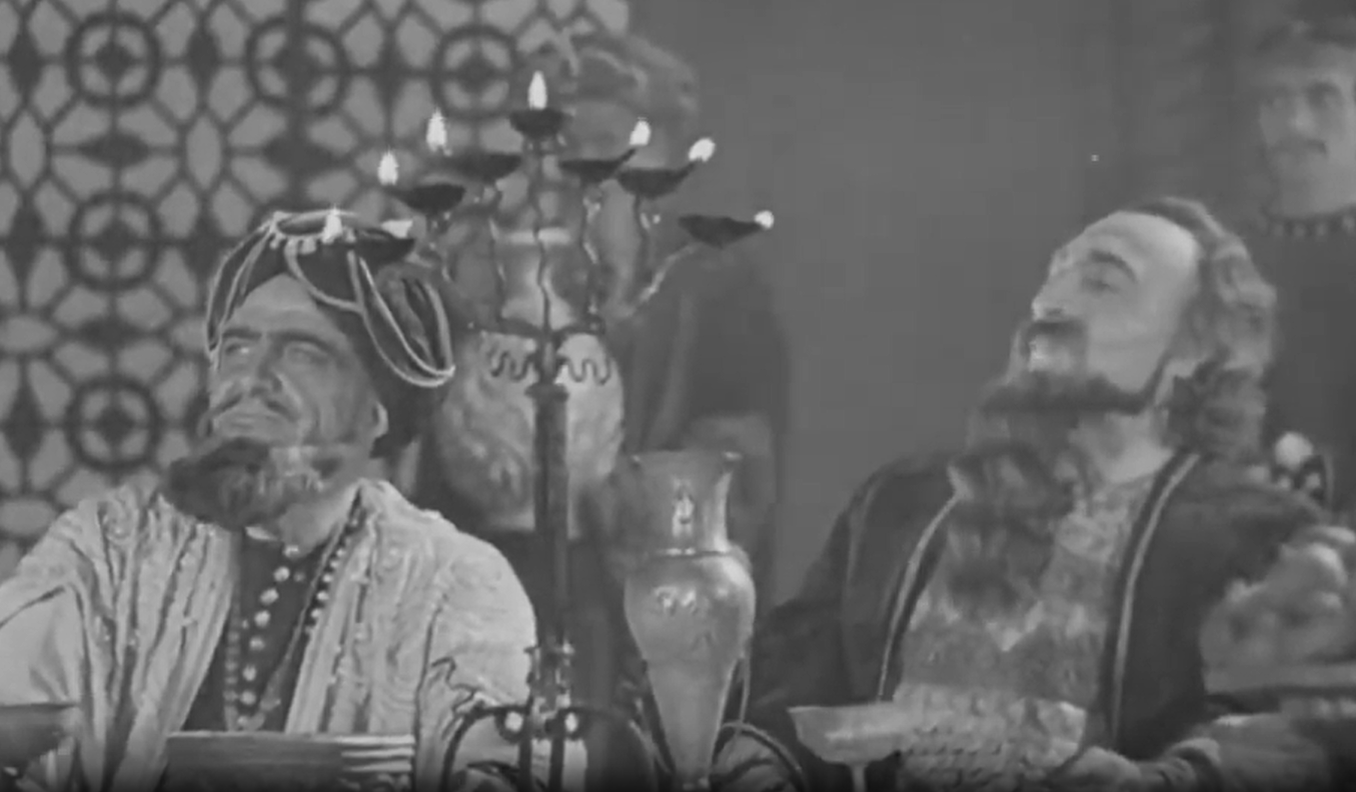
Rachia Nersisyan

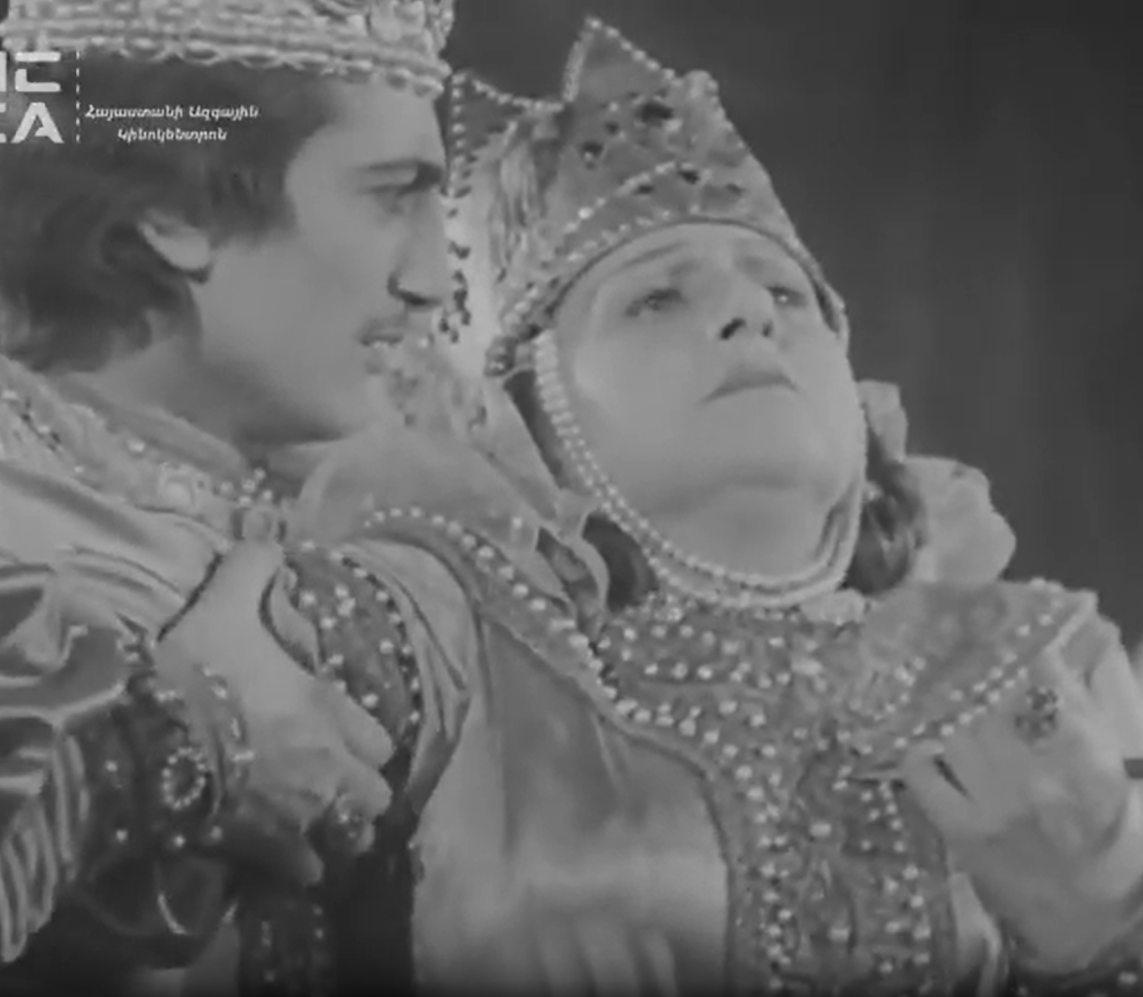
Evgenia Sebar and Frunze Dovlatyan

Consumed by grief, Vachagan nominates his young wife as the regent of his kingdom and rides out with his loyal commander, Hrant, to avenge his mother's death, but is soon ambushed and imprisoned. He hides his identity and is spared his life only for his valuable artisan skill. Enslaved, Vachagan creates a magnificent silk carpet, hiding a message within the patterns using Armenian flower letters "tsaghkagir" (ծաղկագիր). He also suggests his captors that the carpet be taken to King Vachagan's court, promising it will be bought there at a very high price.

When the carpet arrives at the palace, Anahit recognizes her husband's work and decodes the secret text. Having trained herself in swordsmanship, Anahit leads a military mission into enemy territory and rescues her husband by defeating Feizula and Nureddin.

The moral of the story is that possessing a practical craft is a vital asset that transcends social status, offering ultimate survival and salvation when raw power and royal titles fail.

== Cast ==
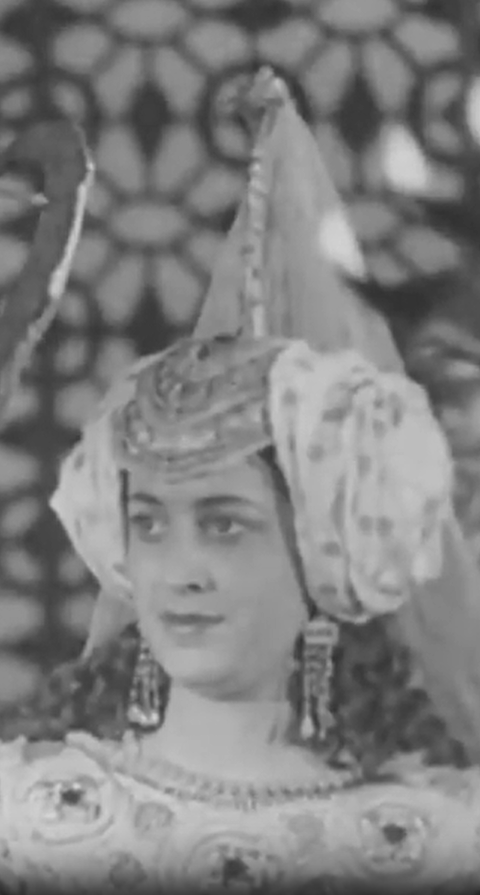
Bella Isahakyan as Feizula

- Metaksia Simonyan - Anahit
- Frunze Dovlatyan - Vachagan, King
- Hrachia Nersisyan - Nureddin
- Yevgenia Sebar - Queen Ashkhen
- Bella Isahakyan - Princess Feizula, Nureddin's daughter
- Avet Avetisyan - Bahatur
- Ori Buniatyan - Aram, Anahit's father
- David Malyan - Prince Hrant, Vachagan's friend
- Khachatur Abrahamyan - Nariman
- Shara Talyan - gusan
- Aram Amirbekyan - soldier
- Vaghinak Marguni - captain of the guards

=== Creative team ===
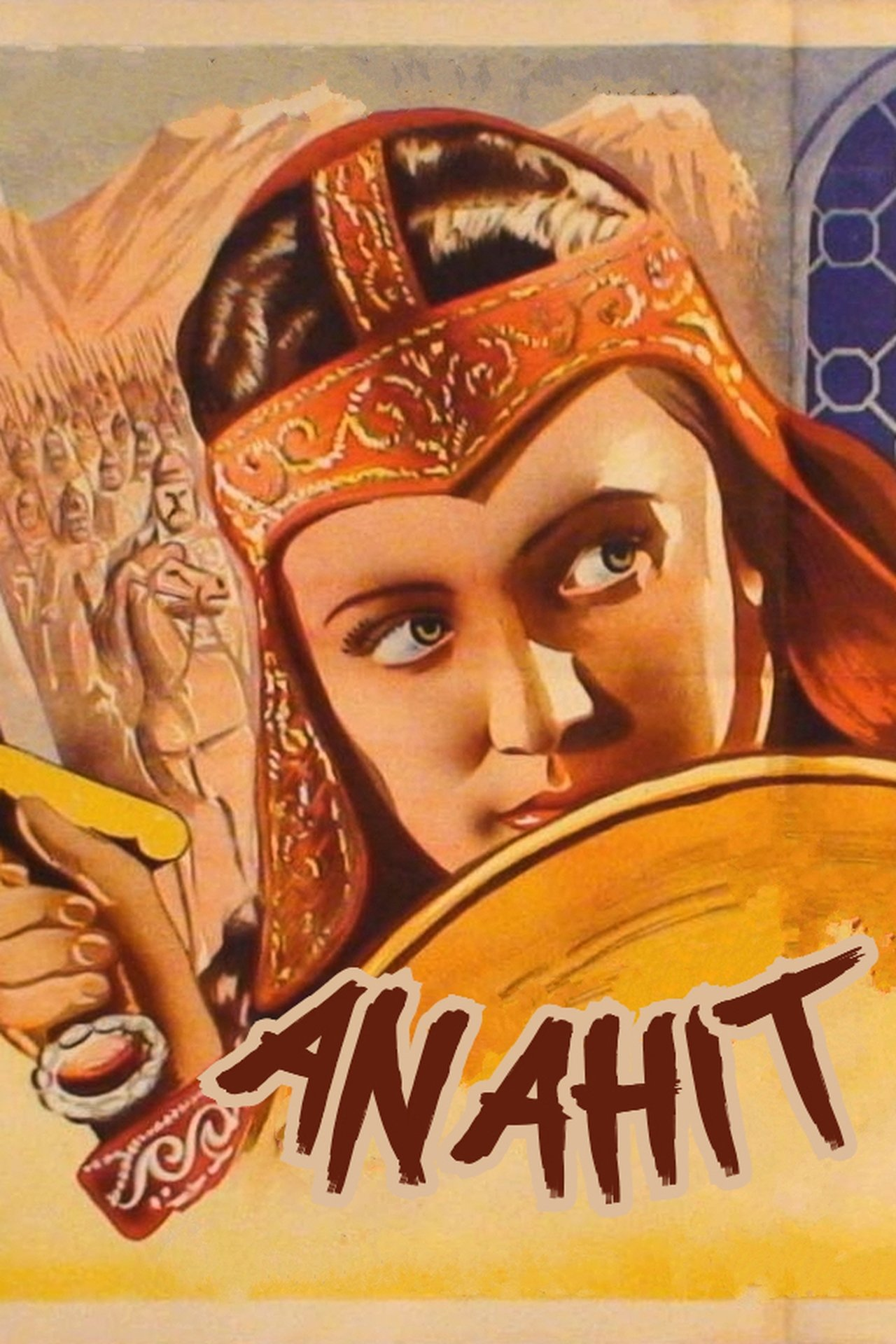
"Anahit" film poster

- Director - Hamo Beknazaryan
- Co-director – Amasi Martirosyan
- Screenwriter - Ghazaros Aghayan; Vladimir Shvejtser
- Music - Ashot Satyan
- Author of lyrics – Gegham Saryan
- Cinematographer - Ivan Dildaryan
- Production artists – Armen Danduryan, Sargis Safaryan, Yuri Shvets
- Architects – Gevorg Aghababyan, Mikayel Allaverdyan
- Producer, studio director – Konstantin Hovhannisyan
- Sound engineer – Ivan Grigoryan
- Assistants to the director – H. Stepanyan, Zh. Injeyan, V. Asilova
- Second cameraman – H. Hovsepyan
- Assistant cameraman – G. Yeghiazaryan
- Assistant editor – G. Meliksetyan
- Joint cameraman – R. Stepanov
- Make-up artist – P. Ashchyan
