= Metaksia Simonyan =

Soviet Armenian actress (1926–1987)

- Մետաքսյա Սիմոնյան
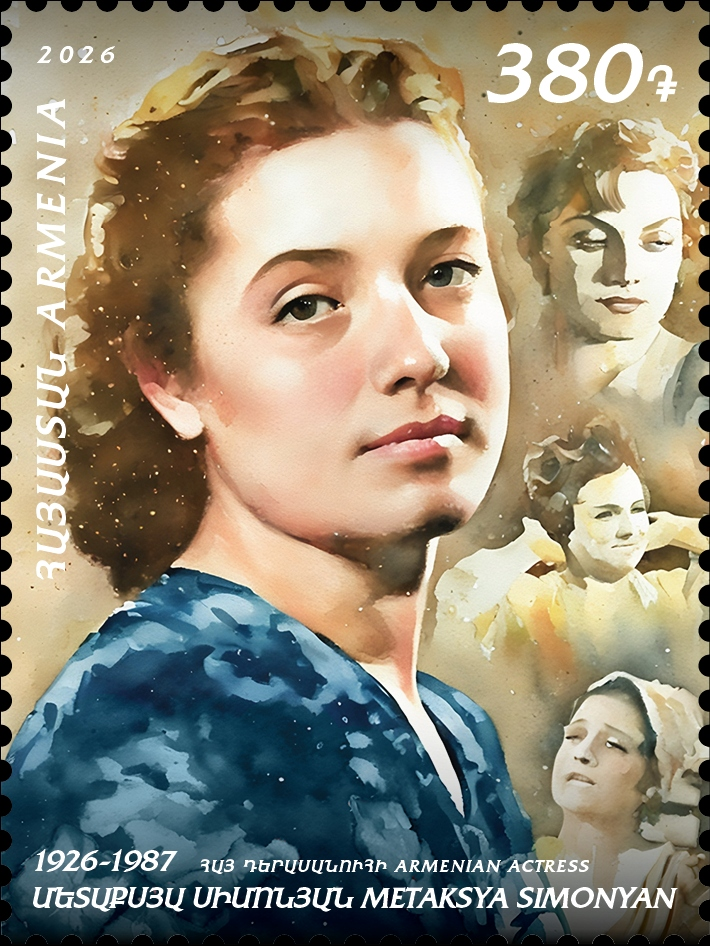
- Simonyan on a 2026 stamp of Armenia
- Born: 21 February 1926; Ashgabat, Turkmen SSR, Soviet Union
- Died: 11 August 1987 (aged 61); Yerevan, Armenian SSR, Soviet Union
- Education: Yerevan State Institute of Theatre and Cinematography
- Occupations: Actress, pedagogue
- Years active: 1948–1987

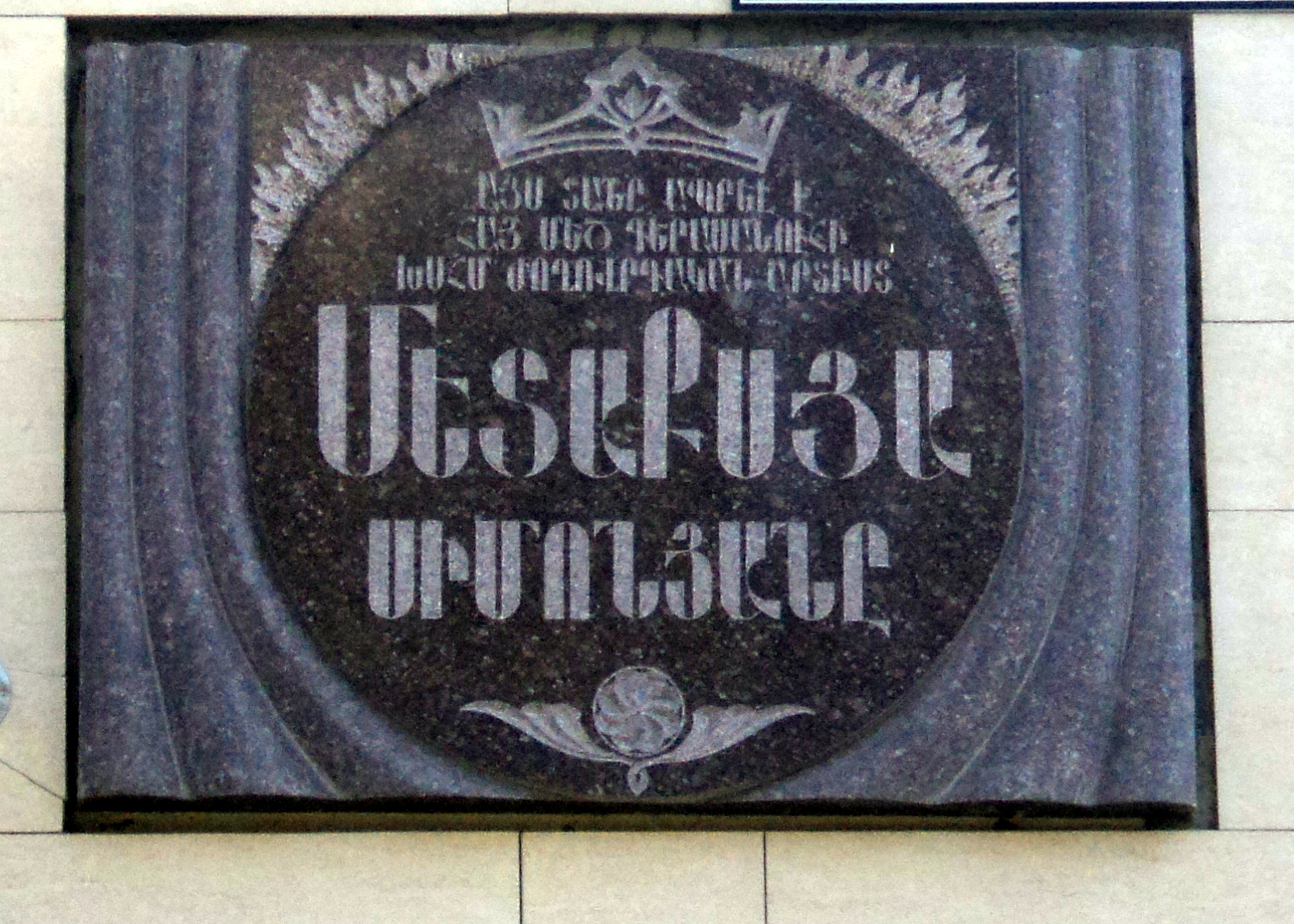
Plaque commemorating Simonyan

Metaksia Migranovna Simonyan (Armenian: Մետաքսյա Միհրանի Սիմոնյան; 21 February 1926 – 11 August 1987) was a Soviet and Armenian stage and film actress and pedagogue.

== Biography ==
Metaksia Simonyan was born in Ashgabat. In 1933 Simonyan moved to Yerevan with her family. In 1948 she graduated from Yerevan State Institute of Theatre and Cinematography. In the same year she was invited to Sundukyan State Academic Theatre. Since 1968 she has taught at Yerevan State Academy of Fine Arts of Armenia.

In the course of studying she played the roles of Katerina (Feodor Sologod's Penny Plucked) and Anani (Gabriel Sundukian's Once Again Another Victim).

Among the first memorable roles are Armanush (Grigor Ter-Grigoryan's These Stars are Ours, Stalin Prize, 1950), Nina (Mikhail Lermontov's Masquerade, Arbenin, Vahram Papazian).

== Career ==
Simonyan continued Arus Voskanyan and Ruzanna Vardanyan's traditions in the Armenian theatre. She also played the same role in the plays of Russian, Western European and Armenian authors, played comic, and tragic roles. Metaksya Simonyan was a leading actress for decades, characters she played include: Shura (Maxim Gorky's Yegor Bulychov and Others), Desdemona, Juliet, Cordelia (William Shakespeare's Othello, Romeo and Juliet, King Lear), Susan (Alexander Shirvanzade's Namus) Then she played the roles of Hudit (Karl Gutzkow's Uriel Acosta), Noudar (Nairi Zarian's Ara Beautiful), Catherine Leffier (Victorian Sardou and Madame San Jen of Ezezip Moro), Martha (Edward Albee's Who's Afraid of Virginia Woolf, last role), etc.

Simonyan also played the role of Nastasia Philipovna (according to Fyodor Dostoevsky's novel Idiot). Namus performance is based on Alexander Shirvanzade's Namus poem, which tells about the love of the young couple, Seyran and Susan, which has a tragic end because of patriarchal prejudice. Here Metaksia Simonyan played Susan's role. Metaksia Simonyan has been shotted in cinema (Anahit, 1947, "A Girl From Ararat Valley", 1949, To Whom The Life Smiles, 1957, A Jump Over the Precipice in 1959, Waters Rise, 1962, The Last Deed of Kamo, 1973, Hayfilm, Sayat-Nova, 1960, TV movie, etc.). She also recited poetry and played on radio and television shows. Simonyan performed in Moscow, Baku, Tbilisi, Beirut, Damascus and elsewhere.

She died in Yerevan at the age of 61.

== Filmography ==
- 1947 – Anahit (as Anahit)
- 1949 – A Girl From Ararat Valley (as Anush)
- 1954 – Trifle (as Varduhi)
- 1955 – Looking of the Addressee (as Manush)
- 1957 – To Whom the Life Smiles (as Zaruhi)
- 1959 – Her Fantasy (as nurse)
- 1959 – A Jump Over the Precipice (as Gayane)
- 1960 – Sayat-Nova (as Anna)
- 1962 – Waters Rise (as Arev)
- 1970 – A Spring of Heghnar (Mkrtich's mother)
- 1971 – Khatabala (in the episodes)
- 1973 – The Last Deed of Kamo (as Arsha)

== Theatrical performances ==
Year	Title	Role	Notes
1949	Masquarade	Nina	Author: Mikhail Lermontov
1955	Namus	Susanna	Author: Alexander Shirvanzade
1960	Romeo and Juliet	Juliet	Author: William Shakespeare
1960	Othello	Dezdemona	Author: William Shakespeare
1970	Uriel Acosta	Hudit	Author: Karl Gurtzkow
1975	Ara Beautiful	Nvard	Author: Nairi Zaryan
1980	Madam San Jean	Katherine Lephevr	Author: Viktorien Sardu
1981	Who is afraid of Virginia Wulf	Marta	Author: Edward Albee
1982	Idiot	Nastasya Phlipovna	Author: Fyodor Dostoevsky
