= Nahid Shahmehri =

- Education: Linköping University
- Occupation: Professor of Computer Science
- Employer: Linköping University
- Website: http://www.ida.liu.se/~nahsh/

Nahid Shahmehri is a professor of Computer Science at Linköping University in Linköping, Sweden,and also a Senior Member of IEEE, specializing in computer and network security issues. She received her PhD in Computer Science from Linköping University in 1991.
