= Nahid (magazine) =

Ottoman-Turkish journal

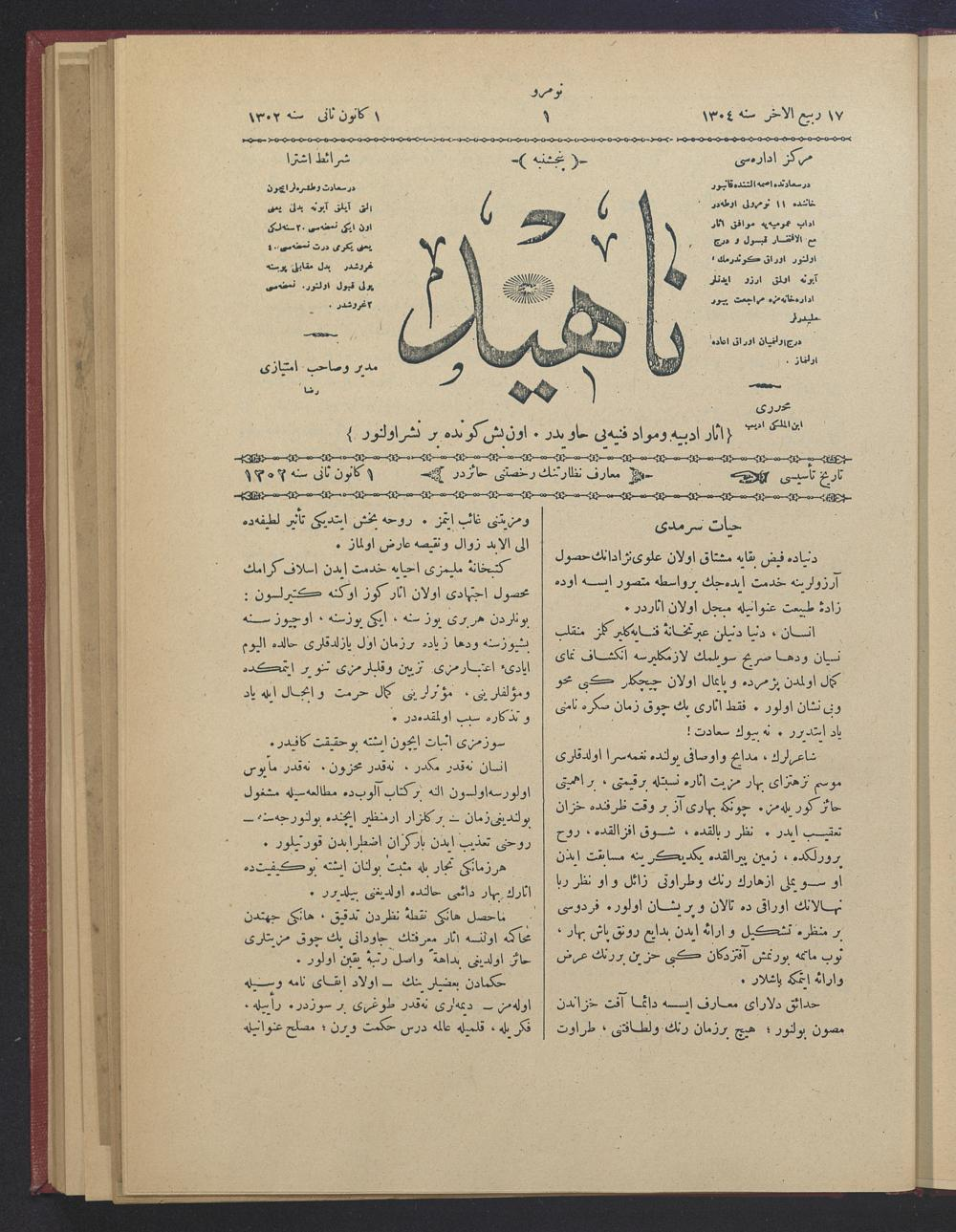
- Founded: 1886
- Final issue: 1887
- Country: Ottoman Empire
- Based in: Istanbul
- Language: Ottoman-Turkish
- Website: Nahid

The Ottoman-Turkish journal Nahid (Ottoman Turkish: ناھید) was published in Istanbul in 1886, and 1887 in a total of 28 issues. Its content focused largely on literary topics, as well as articles on art and culture of that time.
