= Anahid Nersessian =

American writer and critic

Anahid Nersessian (born October 27, 1982) is an American writer and critic who served as the poetry editor of Granta Magazine. Her essays and reviews have appeared in The New Yorker, The New York Review of Books, The London Review of Books, The Paris Review, The Los Angeles Review of Books, n+1, Public Books, and New Left Review. In 2021 Nersessian's Keats's Odes: A Lover's Discourse was named one of the best books of the year by The Boston Globe. She is Professor of English at the University of California, Los Angeles.

== Work ==
Nersessian was born and grew up in New York City. She attended Yale University as an undergraduate and has a Ph.D. in English from the University of Chicago. Her doctoral advisor was the theorist Lauren Berlant.

Nersessian is the author of three books, Utopia, Limited: Romanticism and Adjustment, published by Harvard University Press, The Calamity Form: Poetry and Social Life, published by the University of Chicago Press, and Keats's Odes: A Lover's Discourse, published by the University of Chicago Press in the U.S. and by Verso Books in the U.K. Keats's Odes, a book of personal essays about the English poet John Keats, received positive reviews. The Washington Post called the book "true to Keats's spirit" while Publishers Weekly said that "intense emotion abounds in this literary blend of analysis and autobiography." The Times Literary Supplement described Nersessian's prose as "bold, irreverent, declarative, and feral," and compared the book favorably to other books published on Keats that year. Similarly, the American political magazine Jacobin called it "the best book about John Keats published" on the bicentenary of the poet's death, and The Nation said it was "radical and unforgettable." Writing in The Paris Review, novelist Ben Lerner described Keats's Odes as "risky, passionate criticism" and "a brilliant and refreshingly unprofessional book." In a Boston Review article naming Keats's Odes one of the best books of 2021, Walton Muyumba called the book "a terse, stunning pastiche of Roland Barthes's A Lover's Discourse, adding that "Nersessian proves that criticism can be loving, literary art." The book was a finalist for the Poetry Foundation's 2022 Pegasus Award for Poetry Criticism.

Nersessian is also the editor of the Broadview Press edition of Percy Shelley's long poem Laon and Cythna; Or, the Revolution of the Golden City (2016)--an edition described in a review in the Keats-Shelley Journal as "of vital significance for the study of Romantic literature."

In a 2022 interview with The New York Review of Books, Nersessian described herself as an expert on poetry with interest in political philosophy and the history of literary criticism. Much of her scholarly work to date has focused on eighteenth- and nineteenth-century British and European literature and especially the Romantic period.

Nersessian is represented by The Wylie Agency.

== Personal life ==
Nersessian is of partial Armenian-Iranian ancestry and was raised speaking Armenian as her first language. She has spoken openly about being bullied at school because of her father's Iranian citizenship.

Nersessian is close friends with writer and actress Zoe Kazan.
