= Vardablur, Lori =

Vardablur Վարդաբլուր
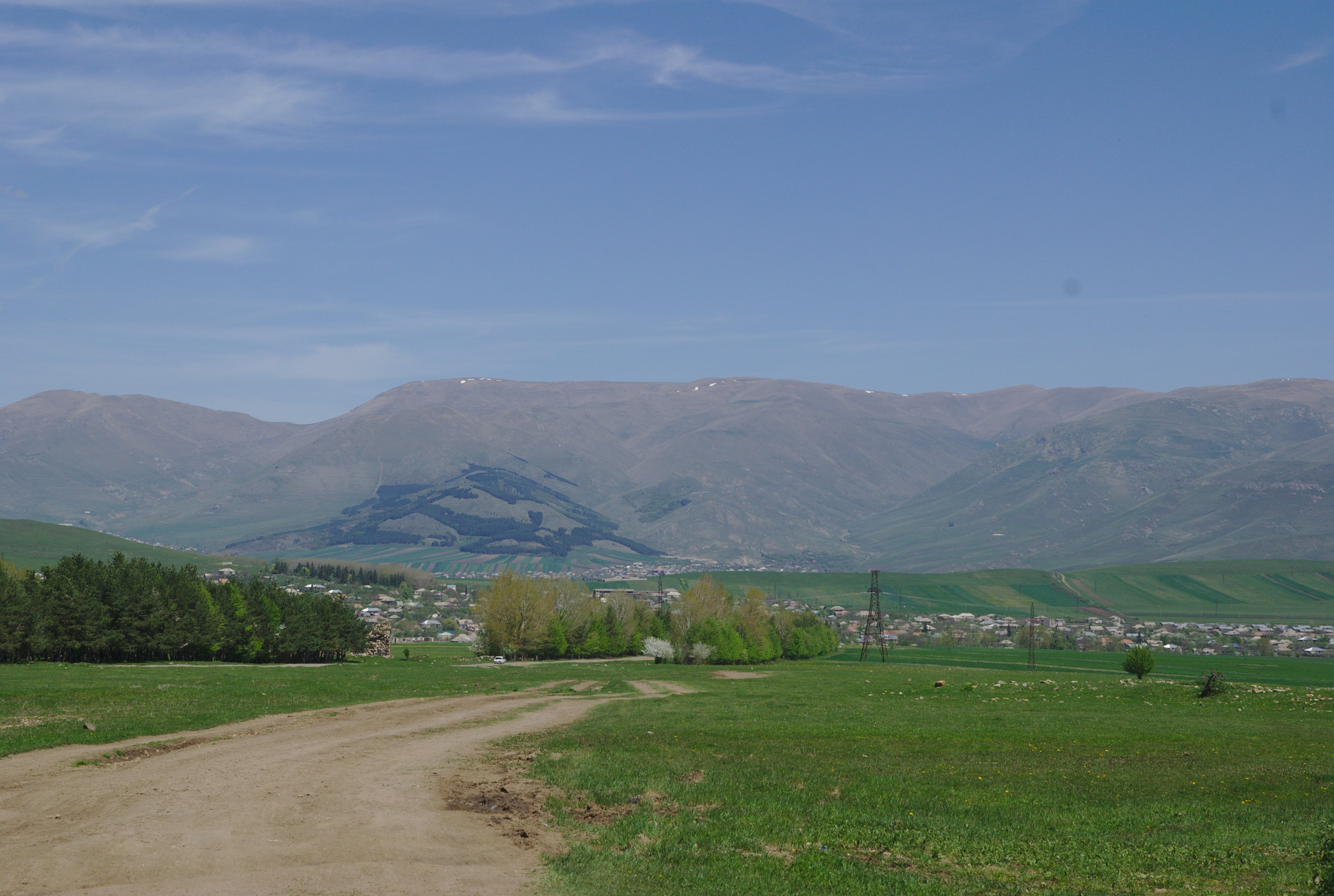

- Location within Armenia
- Coordinates: 40°58′15″N 44°30′32″E
- Country: Armenia
- Province: Lori

Government
  - Village chief: Hakob Vardanyan

Area
  - Total: 13.49 km^{2} (5.21 sq mi)
- Elevation: 1,325 m (4,347 ft)

Population (2011)
  - Total: 1,245
- Time zone: UTC+4 (AMT)
- Area code: 1921

Vardablur (Armenian: Վարդաբլուր) is a village in the Lori Province of Armenia. It is located 19 km (12 mi) northwest of the regional center Vanadzor. It is located on both banks of the Gargar River, at an altitude of 1325 meters above sea level. The highest point is the Holy Sargis mountain, 1,550 m (5,090 ft).

The area of the village is 1,349.0 ha (3,333 acres), of which 119.0 ha (294 acres) is under development, arable land - 803.0 ha (1,984 acres), grassland - 153.0 ha (378 acres), pastures - 203.0 ha (502 acres), unusable reserve land - 68.0 ha (168 acres).

The population is engaged in animal husbandry, cultivation of grains, fodder crops and vegetable growing. In the past, they were engaged in pottery, blacksmithing, and carpet weaving.

== Population ==
According to the results of the census 2011, the permanent population of Vardablur was 1245, the existing population was 1094 people. The inhabitants are Armenians, some of whose ancestors came from the Mets Parni village of Spitak and the villages of Muş and Sason in Western Armenia.

== History ==
=== Education ===
The first school in Vardablur was opened in 1892, which was headed by the village priest Yeghia Zohrabyan. He graduated from Gevorgyan Spiritual Lyceum, studied at Leipzig University and mastered five languages, was one of Hovhannes Tumanyan's close friends. In 1923, a school building for 4 classes was built with the funds of the villagers. In 1932, the school became a seven-year school, and in 1944, it graduated the first graduates with secondary education. The typical school building built in 1979 was destroyed during the Spitak earthquake. Vagharshak Harutyunyan, Navasardyan, Mukuch Stepanyan, Vaghinak Amirkhanyan, Shavarsh Sargsyan, Koryun Hakobyan, Andranik Khachatryan, Zaven Vardanyan, Nvard Vardanyan, Haykaram Harutyunyan worked as principals of the school.

Since February 2021, Elsa Vahradyan has been the director of the school . The school has an ethnographic museum rich in valuable collections. The Armat laboratory of information technologies has been operating since 2020, and Artyom Gasparyan is the head of it since November 2021.

It was in this village where the Armenian priest and musicologist Komitas composed Horovel (Armenian: Հորովել) and where the national poet of Armenia Hovhannes Tumanyan wrote Hazaran Bulbul (Armenian: Հազարան Բըլբուլ).

=== Historical and cultural monuments ===
On the eastern side of the village, on the top of the Holy Sargis mountain, there is the Cyclopean masonry and the chapel of the same name, ″The Asron″ built by the Kiurikian kings (Kiurikian dynasty, year of 1050), on the northern side, on the right-hand side gorge of Dzoraget, there are the Jgrashen church (6th century) and The Broken Clock (6th century), in the village - St. Astvatsatsin Church (1876) and St. Khach (12th century) church. In 1968, the monument dedicated to the memory of the victims of The Great Patriotic War was opened (architect: Vardges Papoyan, sculptor: Shavarsh Hovhannisyan). In 1990, the first monument dedicated to the memory of oppressed in Armenia was built (in 1937), and in the village sculptor Grigor Manukyan's "The Cross and the Woman" (2015) and monuments (2016) dedicated to the creation of the song "Lorva Gutanerg" and Reverend Komitas were built.

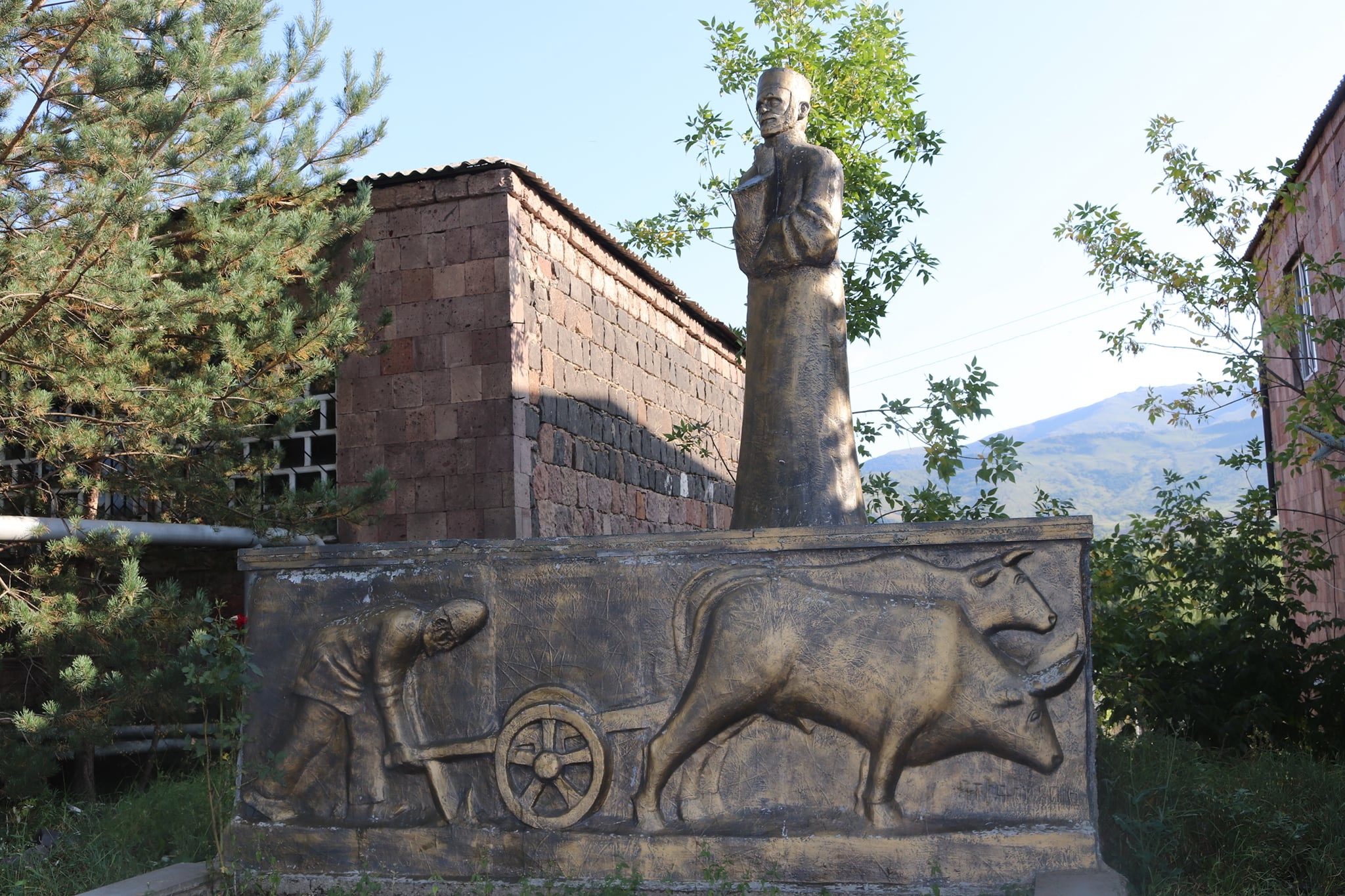
"Horovel" monument in the Vardablur village dedicated to the Reverend Komitas

== Notable people ==
- Aghvan Chatinyan, an Armenian mountaineer and several times Caucasus rock climbing champion.

== Gallery ==
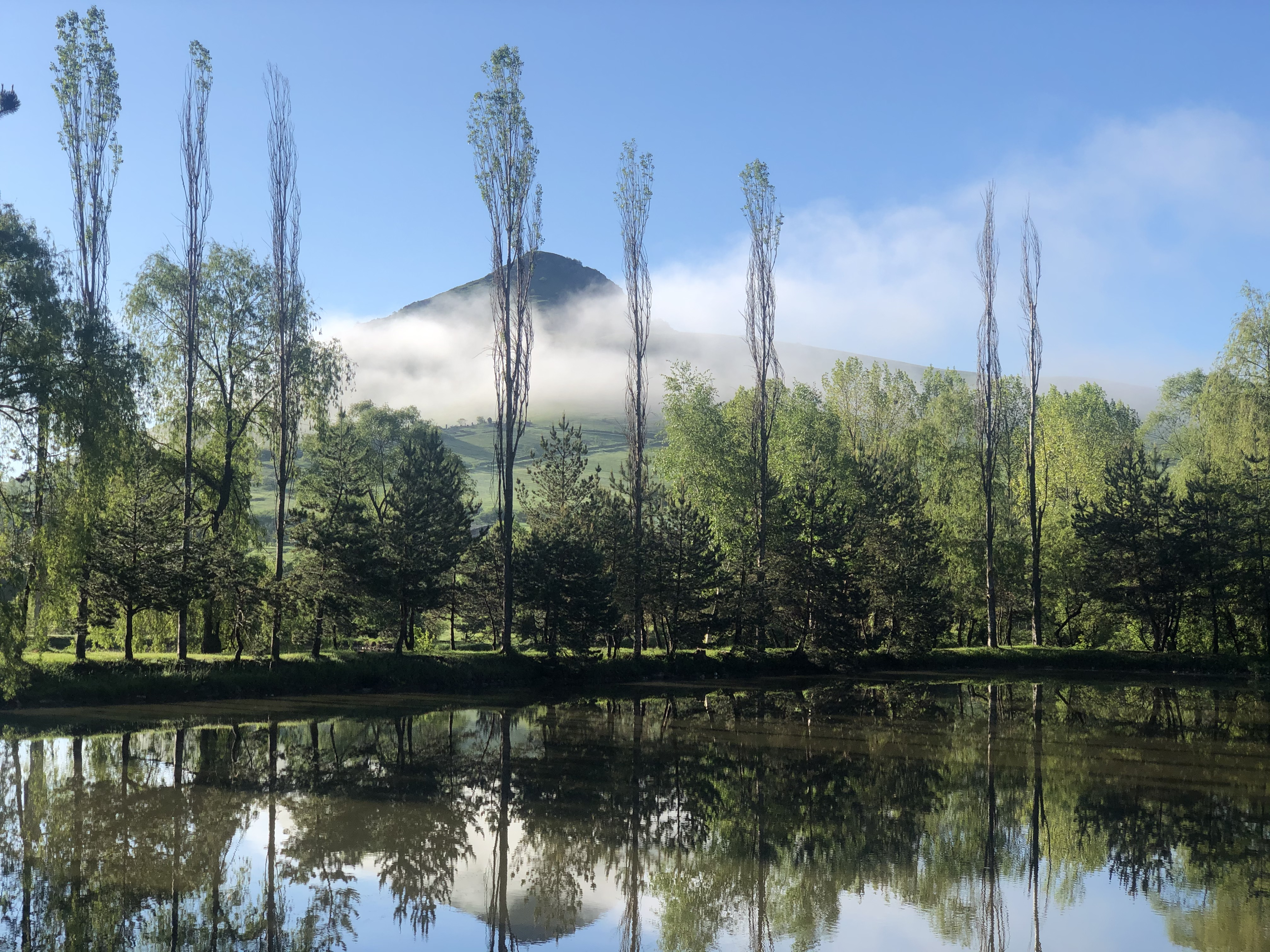

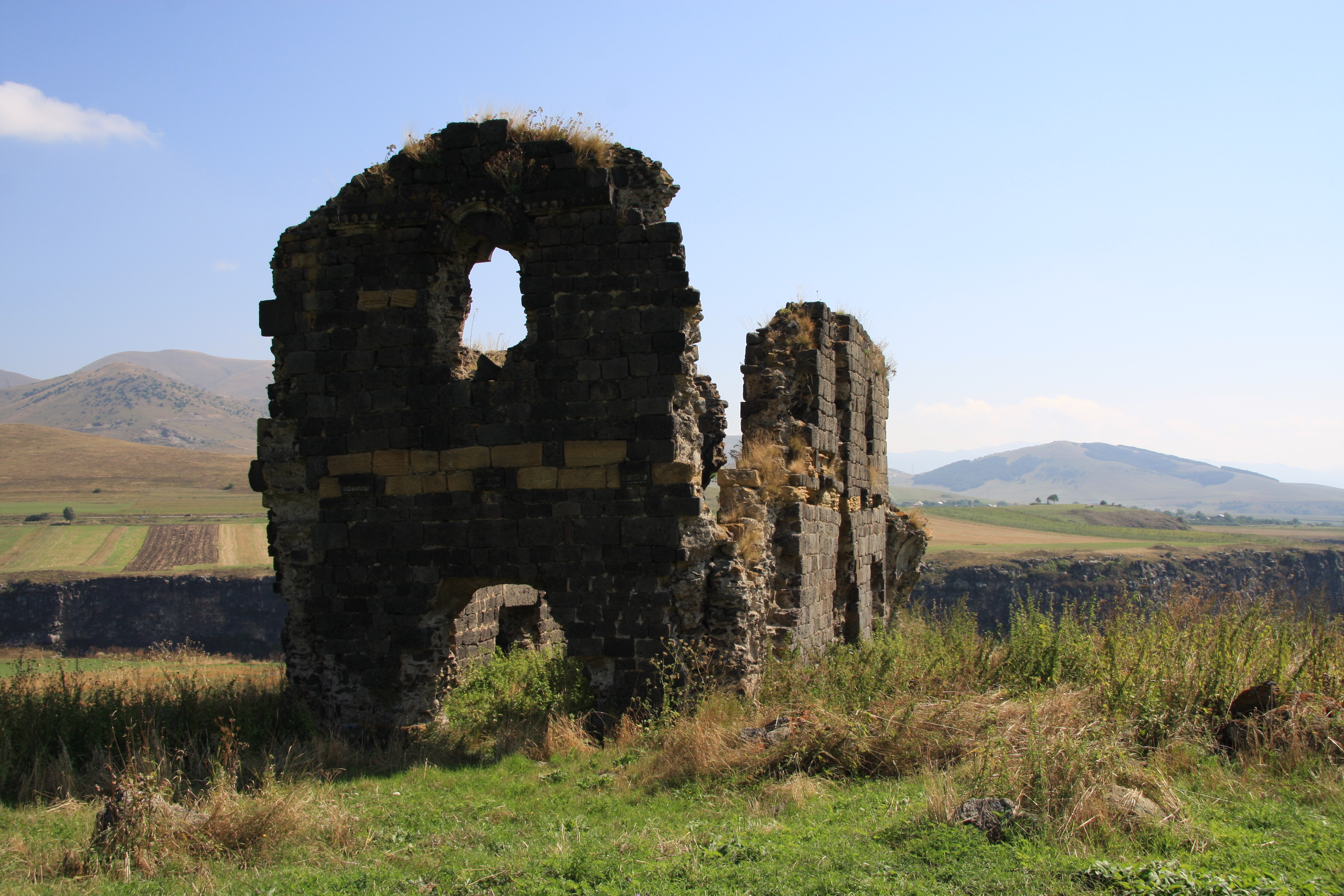

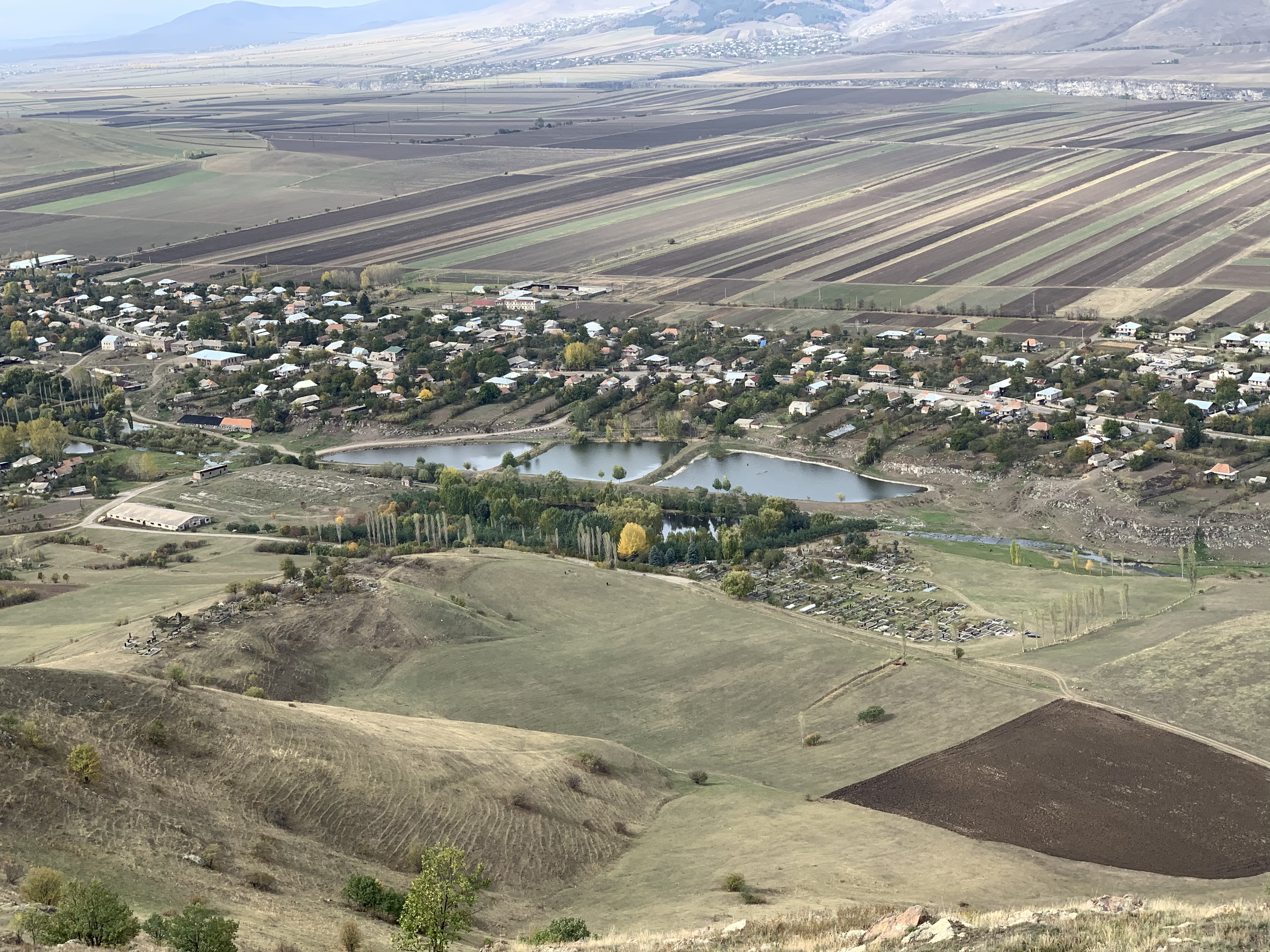

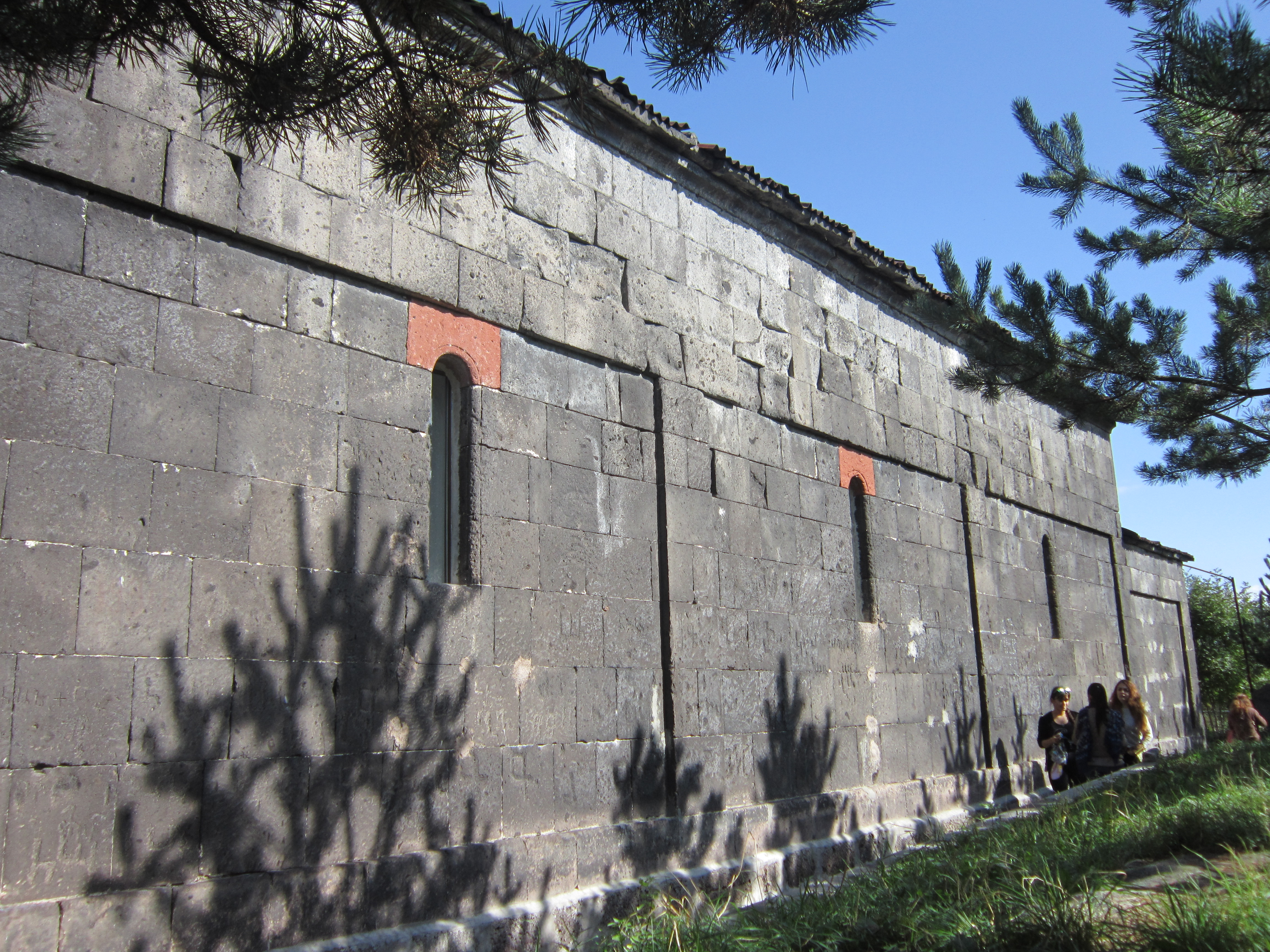

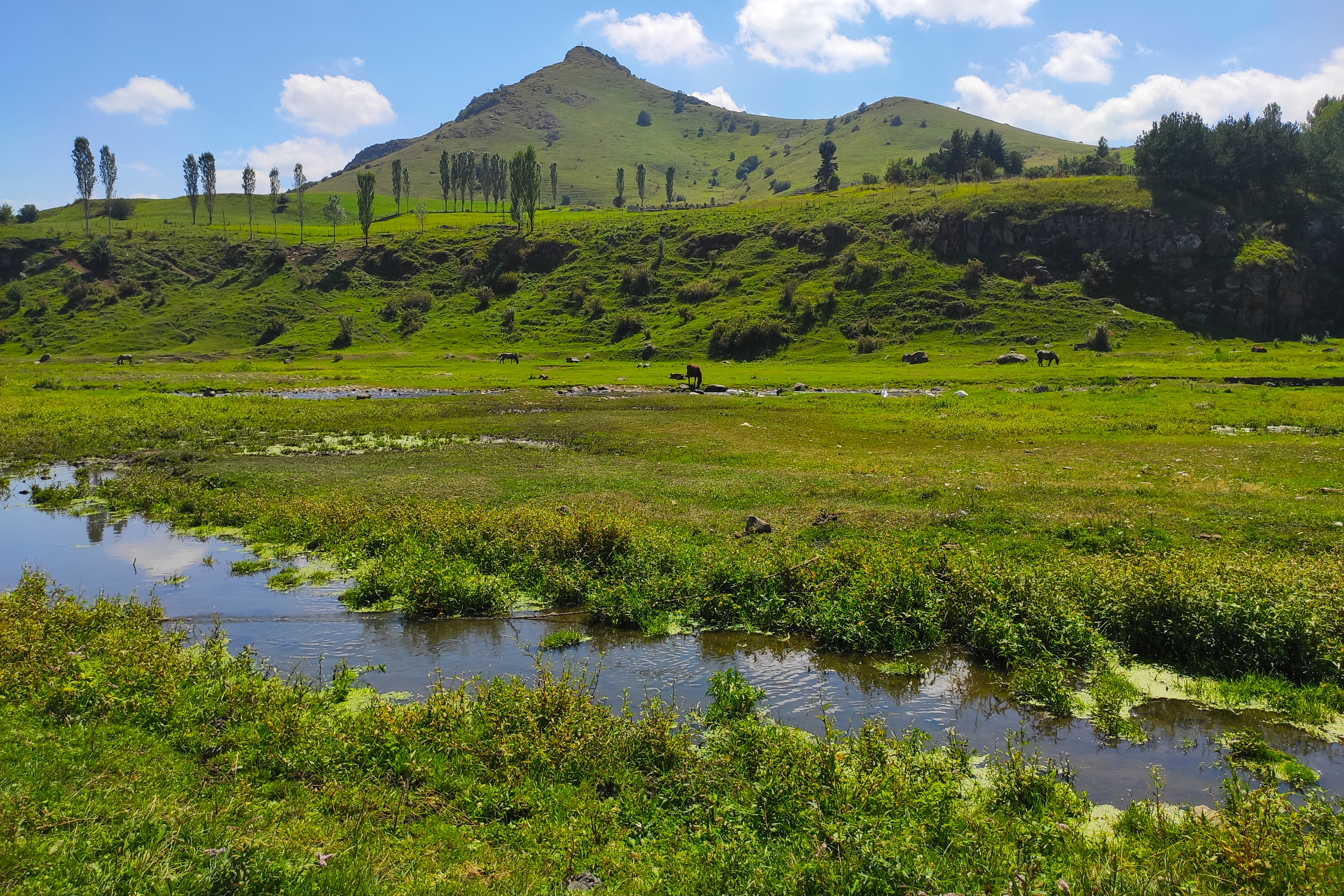

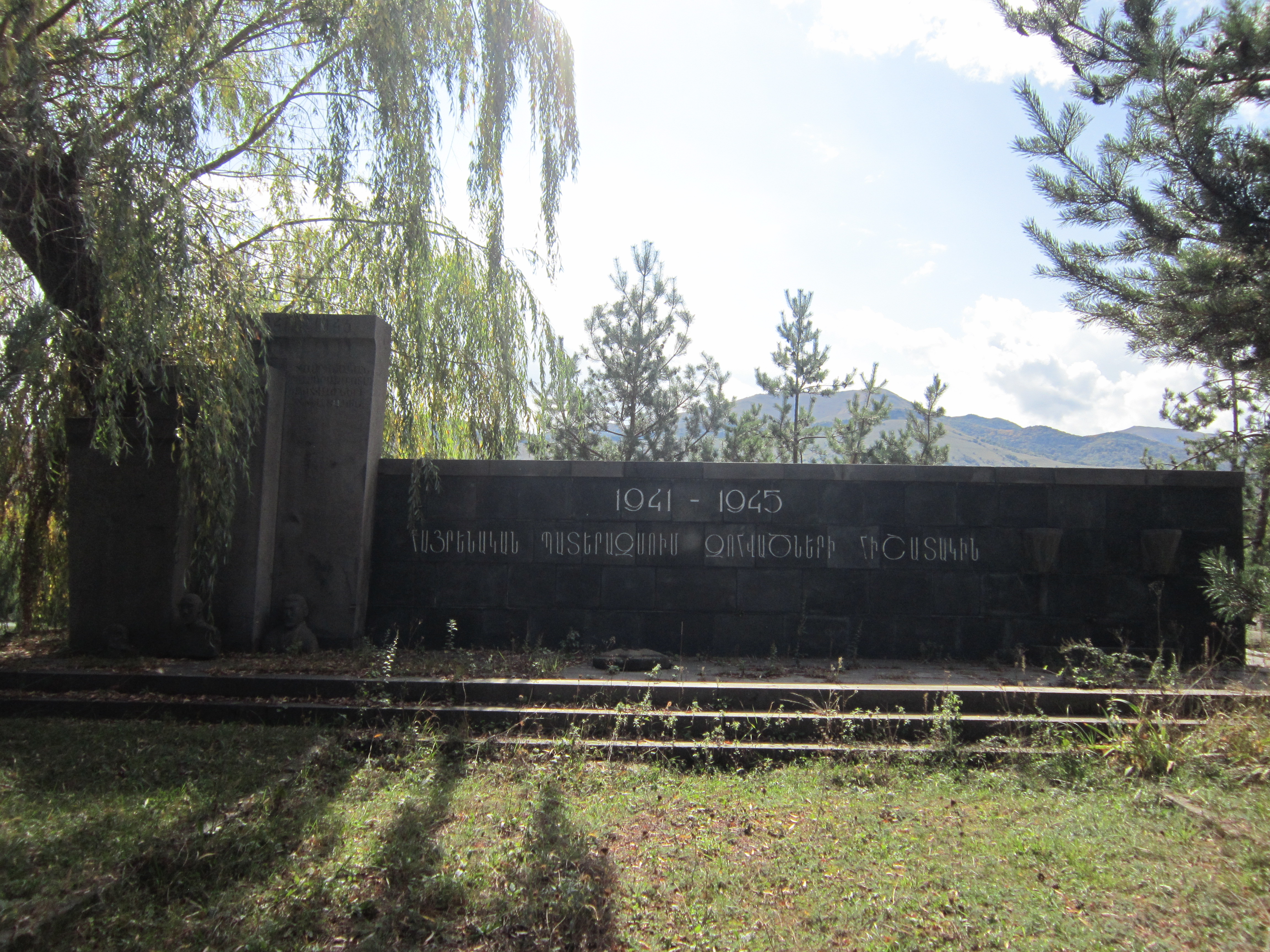

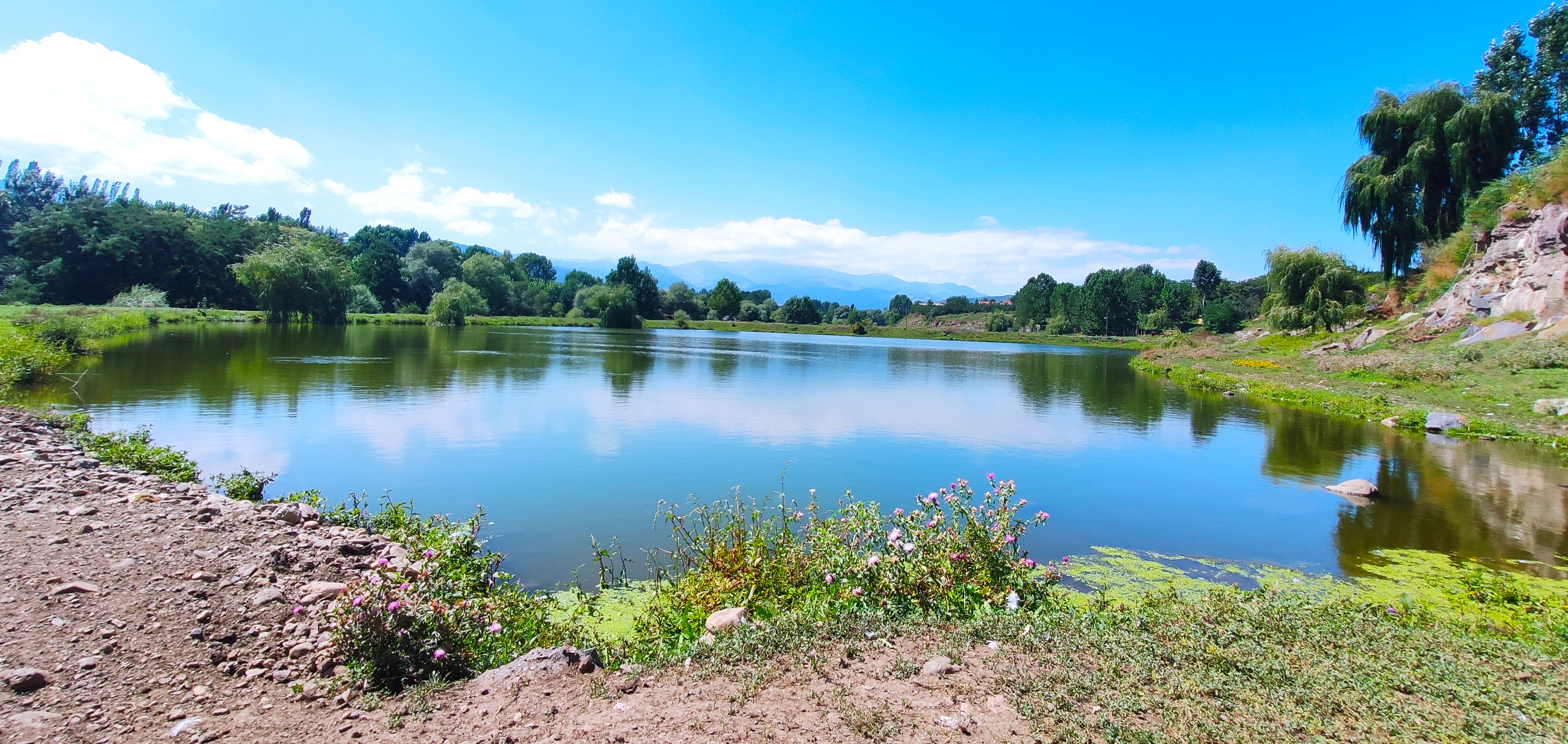

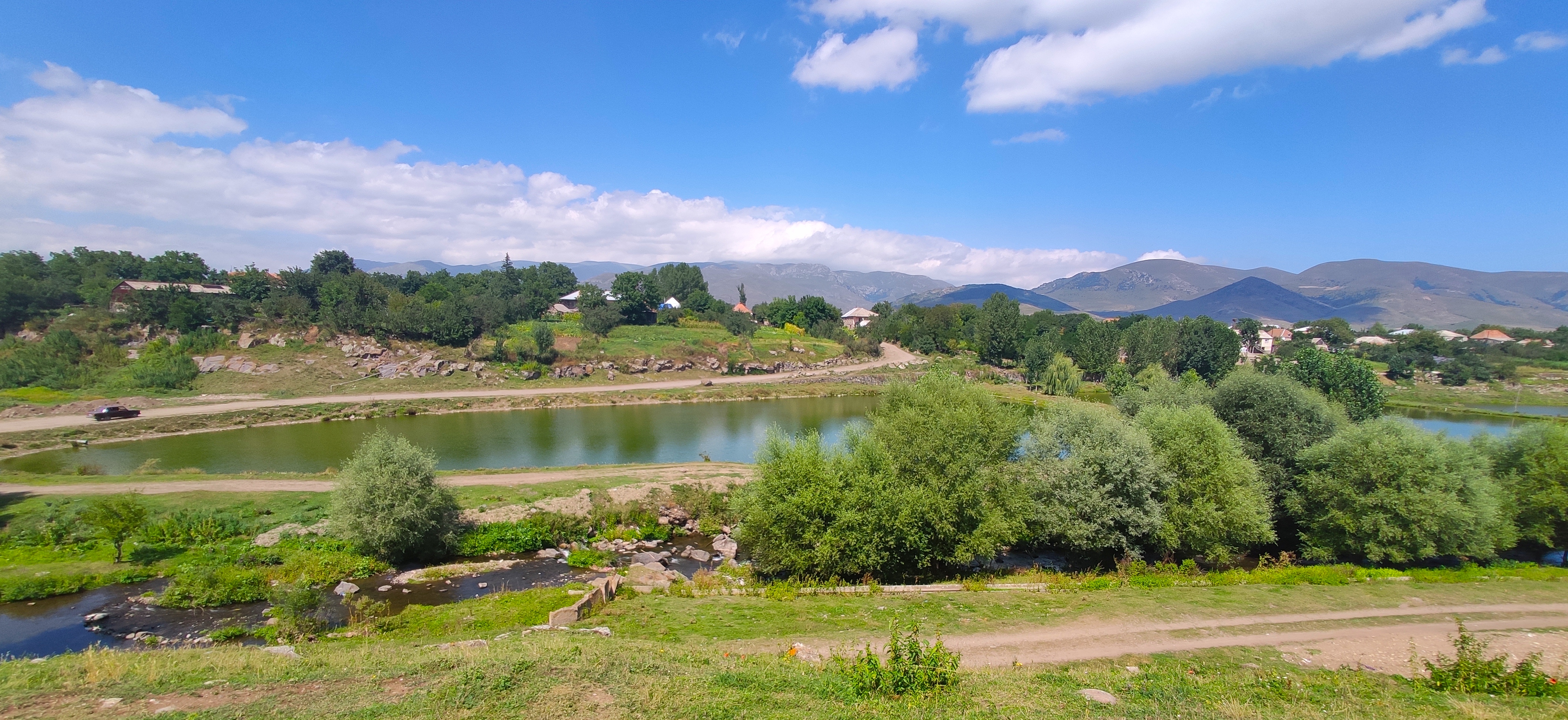

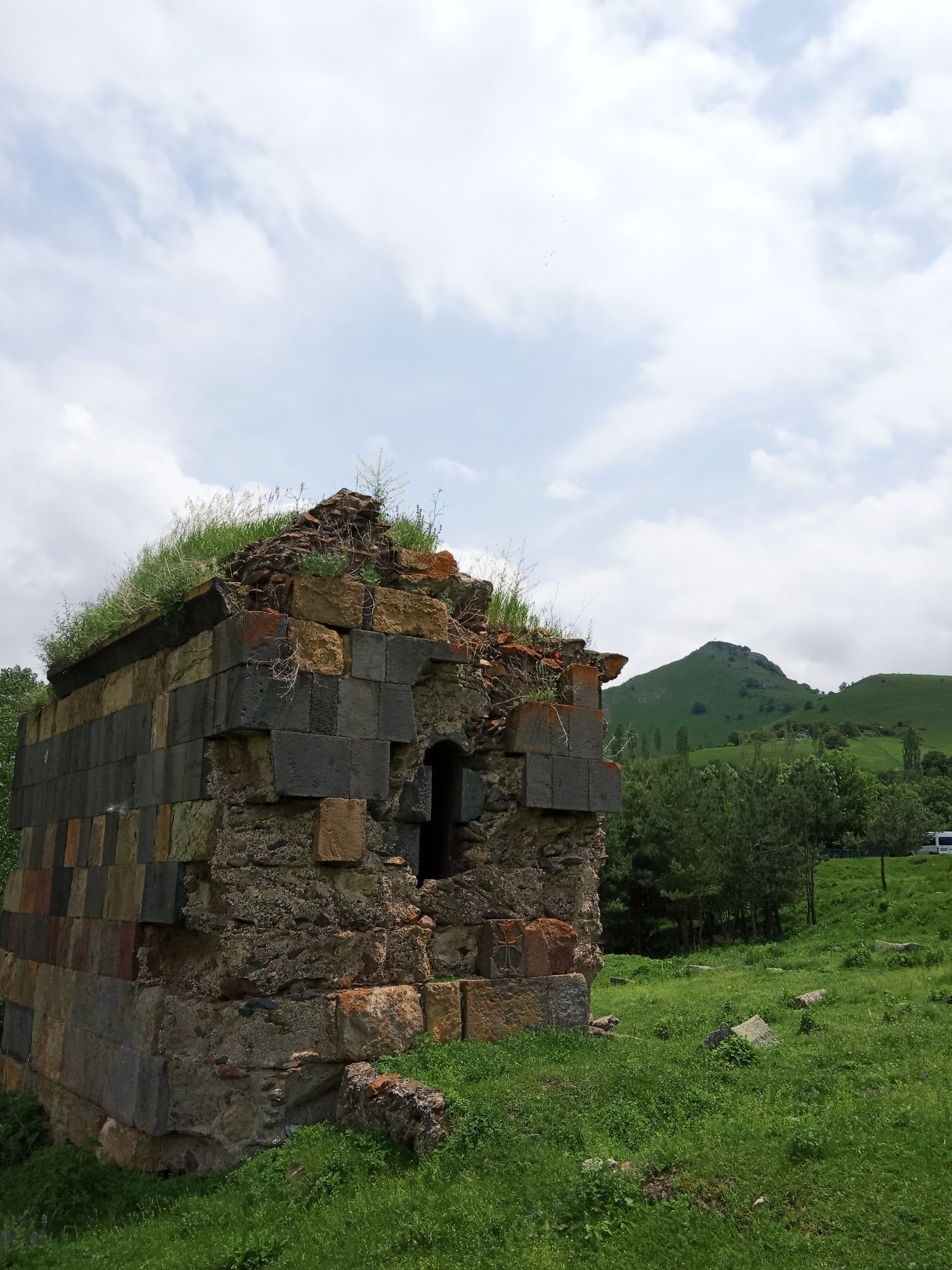

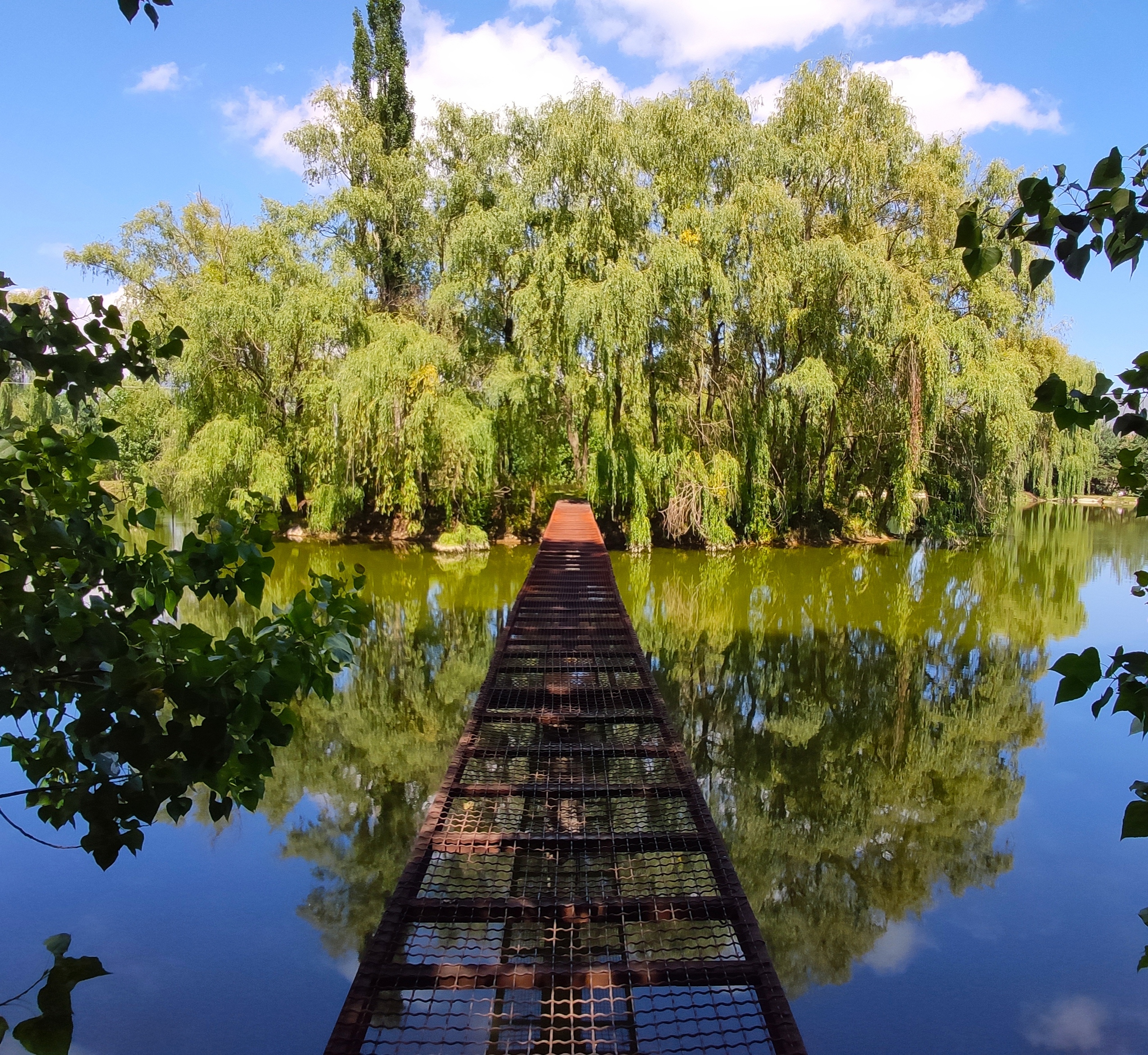

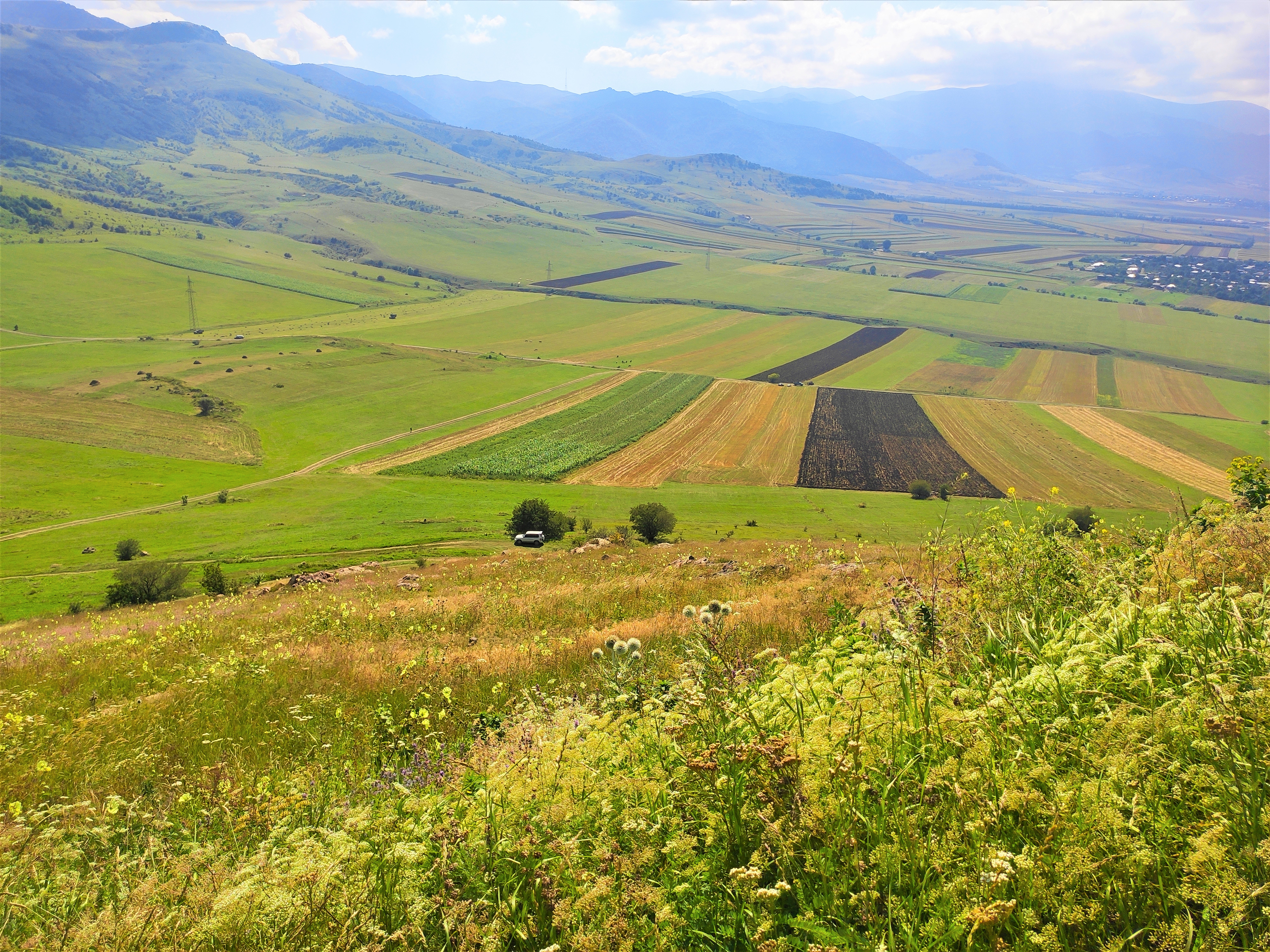

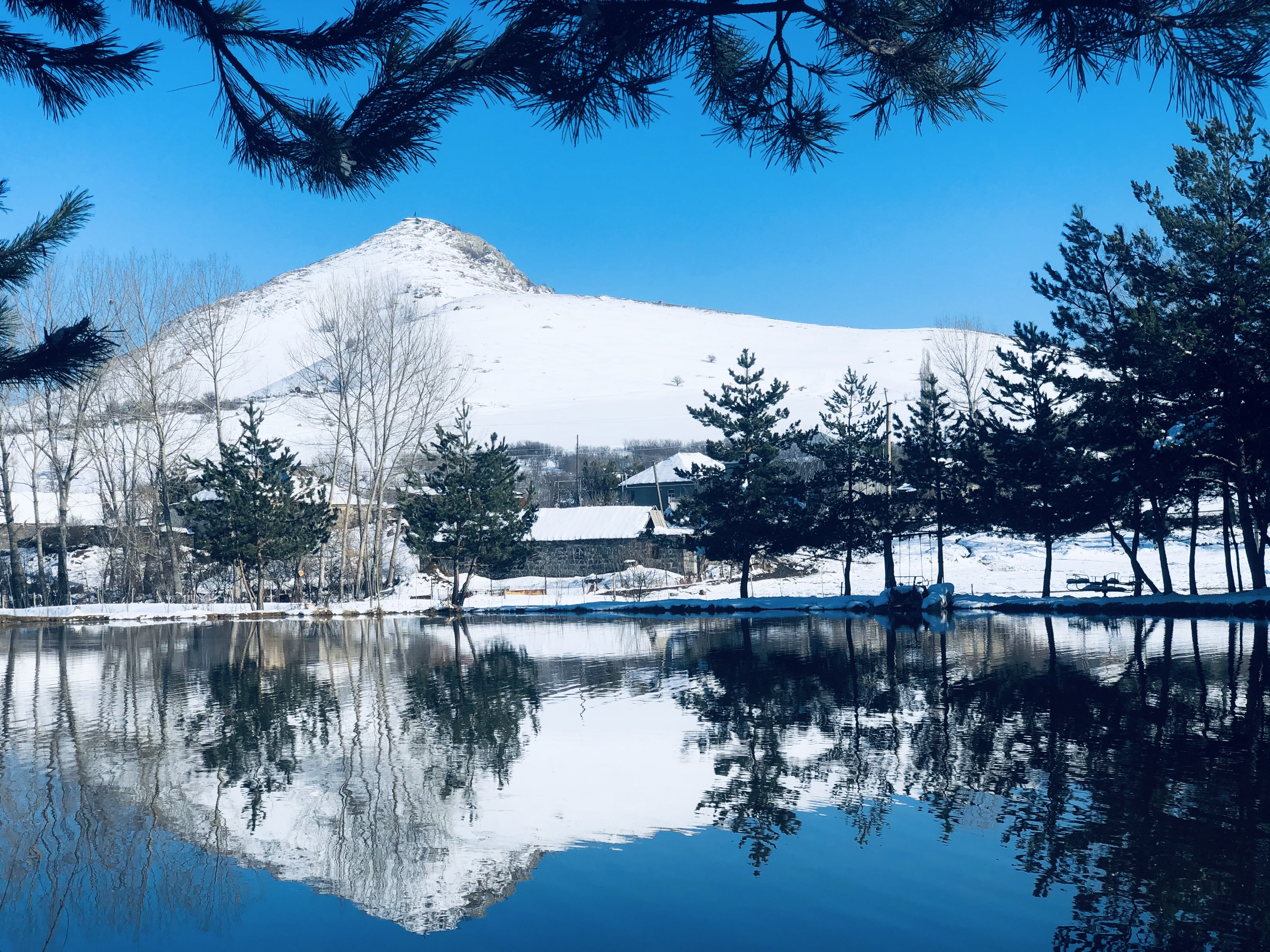

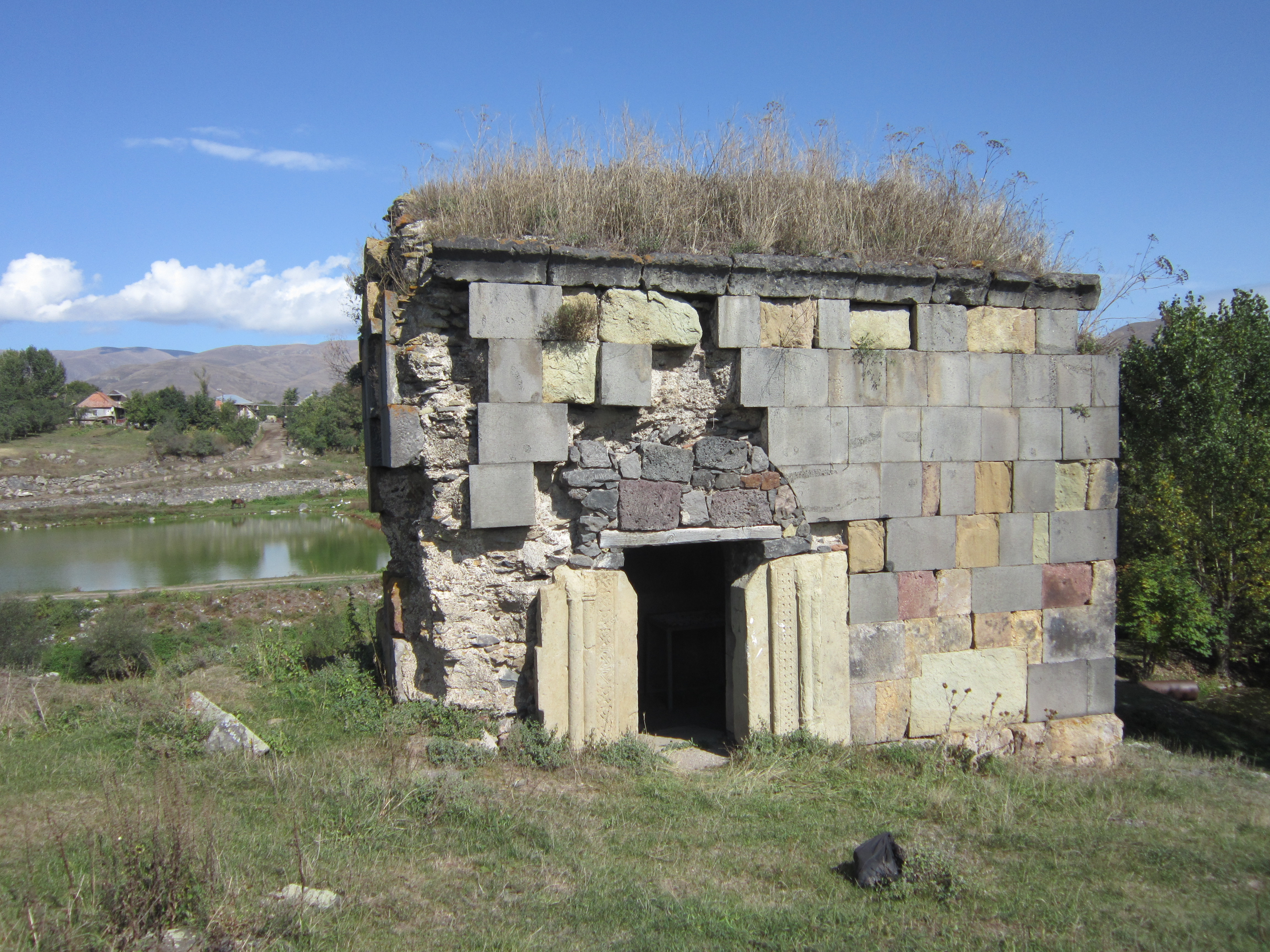

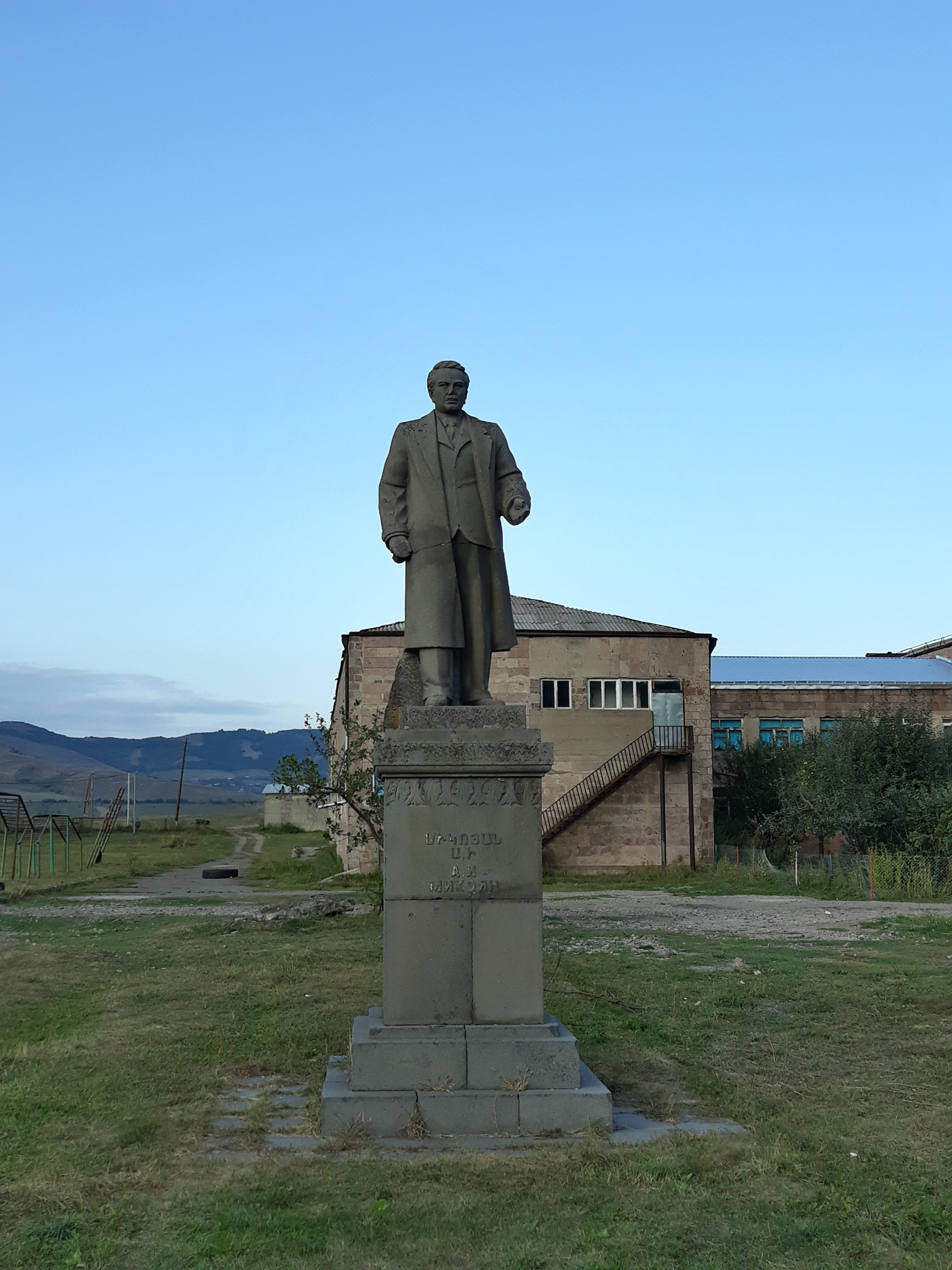
