= Temple of Anahita =

Temple of Anahita may refer to:

- Temple of Anahita, Istakhr, Iran
- Temple of Anahita, Kangavar, Iran
- Temple of Anahita, Bishapu, Iran
- Temple of Anahita, Adurbadagan, Iran
