= Anahit Maschyan =

- Born: November 9, 1900; Alexandrapol, Erivan Governorate, Russian Empire
- Died: January 3, 1989 (aged 88); Yerevan, Armenian SSR, Soviet Union
- Citizenship: Soviet Union
- Occupation: actress

Anahit Maschyan (Armenian: Անահիտ Մասչյան, November 9, 1900 – January 3, 1989) was an Armenian theater and film actress. People's Artist of the Armenian SSR (1950).

== Biography ==
Anahit Maschyan was born in 1900 in Alexandrapol, Erivan Governorate, Russian Empire. 1919–1925 studied at the Armenian dramatic studio in Moscow. 1928–1929, she was an actor at Leninakan Dramatic Theater, 1930–1945 Yerevan State Youth Theatre, 1945–1958 Sundukyan State Academic Theatre of Yerevan,

== Filmography ==
Year	Film	Role
1968	Saroyan Brothers	Mother

=== Theatre Roles ===
Author	Performance	Role
Hakob Paronyan	The Honorable Beggars	Shoghakat
Gabriel Sundukyan	Pepo	Ephemia
Hovhannes Tumanyan	Gikor	Nato
I. Popov	American stories	Maria Alexandrovna
Derenik Demirchyan	Nazar the brave	Ustian
Alexander Ostrovsky	A Profitable Position	Kukushkina

== Awards ==
- People's Artist of the Armenian SSR (1950).
- Medal "For Labor Distinction" (27.06.1956).

== Family ==
Anahit Maschyan was married to Armenian actor Armen Gulakyan.
