= Anahit Bakhshyan =

Armenian politician

Anahit Nersesi Bakhshyan (born September 20, 1947 in Yerevan) is an Armenian Member of Parliament, public activist and the widow of Yuri Bakhshyan, a member of Heritage party board.

She finished the faculty of Physics of the Yerevan State University, worked as a teacher of physics, then as a methodologist of the People's Educational Division of Yerevan Shahumian district. From 1989 to 1998, she was the Deputy Director of Yerevan Siamanto School. Bakhshyan was the director of Yerevan D. Demirchian School.

On May 12, 2007, she was elected as a deputy of the National Assembly of Armenia from the Heritage party. She is a widow, has three children.
