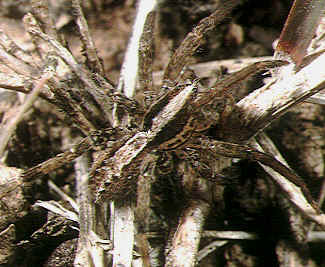
- female Anahita fauna from Okinawa

Scientific classification
- Domain: Eukaryota
- Kingdom: Animalia
- Phylum: Arthropoda
- Subphylum: Chelicerata
- Class: Arachnida
- Order: Araneae
- Infraorder: Araneomorphae
- Family: Ctenidae
- Genus: Anahita; Karsch, 1879

Type species
- A. fauna Karsch, 1879

Species
- 29, see text

= Anahita (spider) =

Genus of spiders

Anahita is a genus of wandering spiders first described by Ferdinand Karsch in 1879.

== Species ==
As of April 2019 it contains twenty-nine species, many from Africa and Asia:

- Anahita aculeata (Simon, 1897) – West, Central Africa
- Anahita blandini Benoit, 1977 – Ivory Coast
- Anahita centralis Benoit, 1977 – Central Africa
- Anahita concrassata Benoit, 1977 – Burundi
- Anahita concreata Benoit, 1977 – Congo
- Anahita concussor Benoit, 1977 – Congo
- Anahita denticulata (Simon, 1884) – Myanmar, Indonesia (Simeulue)
- Anahita faradjensis Lessert, 1929 – Congo
- Anahita fauna Karsch, 1879 (type) – Russia (Far East), China, Korea, Japan
- Anahita feae (F. O. Pickard-Cambridge, 1902) – Myanmar
- Anahita jianfengensis Zhang, Hu & Han, 2011 – China
- Anahita jinsi Jäger, 2012 – China
- Anahita jucunda (Thorell, 1897) – Myanmar
- Anahita lineata Simon, 1897 – Ivory Coast, Congo
- Anahita lycosina (Simon, 1897) – West Africa
- Anahita mamma Karsch, 1884 – West, Central, East Africa
- Anahita maolan Zhu, Chen & Song, 1999 – China, Taiwan
- Anahita nathani Strand, 1907 – Bahama Is.
- Anahita pallida (L. Koch, 1875) – Egypt, Ethiopia
- Anahita popa Jäger & Minn, 2015 – Myanmar
- Anahita punctata (Thorell, 1890) – Indonesia (Sumatra)
- Anahita punctulata (Hentz, 1844) – USA
- Anahita pygmaea Benoit, 1977 – Ivory Coast
- Anahita samplexa Yin, Tang & Gong, 2000 – China, Korea
- Anahita similis Caporiacco, 1947 – Central, East Africa
- Anahita smythiesi (Simon, 1897) – India
- Anahita syriaca (O. Pickard-Cambridge, 1872) – Israel
- Anahita wuyiensis Li, Jin & Zhang, 2014 – China
- Anahita zoroides Schmidt & Krause, 1994 – Comoros
