= Anahita (given name) =

Anahita (Persian: آناهیتا) is a feminine given name named after the ancient Iranian goddess Anahita, associated with fertility, healing and wisdom. The name has increased in usage in recent years along with other mythological names. People named Anahita include:

- Anahita Dargahi (born 1987), Iranian actress
- Anahita Hemmati (born 1973), Iranian actress
- Anahita Khalatbari, American journalist
- Anahita Nemati (born 1977), Iranian actress and model
- Anahita Norouzi (born 1988), Iranian artist
- Anahita Uberoi (born 1967), Indian actress
- Anahita Ratebzad (1931–2014), Afghan socialist
- Anahita Razmi (born 1981), German visual artist, of Iranian–German descent
- Anahita Zahedifar (born 2003), Iranian chess player

== See also ==
- Anaita Shroff Adajania (born 1972), Indian fashion designer
- Anahit (name)
