= Aghvan Chatinyan =

Armenian climber (1927–2025)

Aghvan Chatinyan (Armenian: Աղվան Չատինյան; 20 November 1927 – 20 April 2025) was an Armenian mountaineer and several times Caucasus rock climbing champion.

== Biography ==
Chatinyan was born in Vardablur, Stepanavan, Armenia on 20 November 1927. At the 1952 Caucasus Championship of rock climbing in Arzni, he defeated Soviet climber Mikhael Khergiani and took the first place, but this fact is noted only in the October issue of the newspaper Kommunist (October 30, 1952) and nowhere else not to overshadow the legendary Khergiani. Chatinyan graduated from Kirovakan Agricultural College in 1945 and Armenian State Institute of Physical Culture in 1952. He worked there as a professor from 1999. Chatinyan was an honorable member of the Armenian Olympic Committee. He died on 20 April 2025, at the age of 97.
