= List of Armenian films of 2014 =

The Armenian film industry produced over ten feature films in 2014. This article fully lists all non-pornographic films, including short films, that had a release date in that year and which were at least partly made by Armenia. It does not include films first released in previous years that had release dates in 2014.
Also included is an overview of the major events in Armenian film, including film festivals and awards ceremonies, as well as lists of those films that have been particularly well received, both critically and financially.

== Minor releases ==
Title	Director	Release date	Genre
Anahit	David Sahakyants	27 December 2014 (Armenia)	Animation
Half Moon Bay	Marine Zakaryan	27 March 2014 (Armenia)	Comedy
Instead of Someone	Hrant Yeritskinyan	6 November 2014 (Armenia)	Comedy
In the Camp	Ashot Hakobyan	22 September 2014 (Armenia)	Comedy
Thank You, Dad	Hrach Keshishyan	31 May 2014 (Armenia)	Comedy
The Abode	Lusine Sargsyan	27 July 2014 (Armenia)	Comedy
The Dead Forrest	Roman Musheghyan	29 August 2014 (Armenia)	Horror
The House in the Heart	Hrach Keshishyan	4 September 2014 (Armenia)	Comedy
The Romanticists	Areg Azatyan	25 January 2014 (Armenia)	Drama

== See also ==
- 2014 in film
- 2014 in Armenia
- Cinema of Armenia
- List of Armenian submissions for the Academy Award for Best Foreign Language Film
