= Ghazaros Aghayan =

Armenian writer (1840–1911)

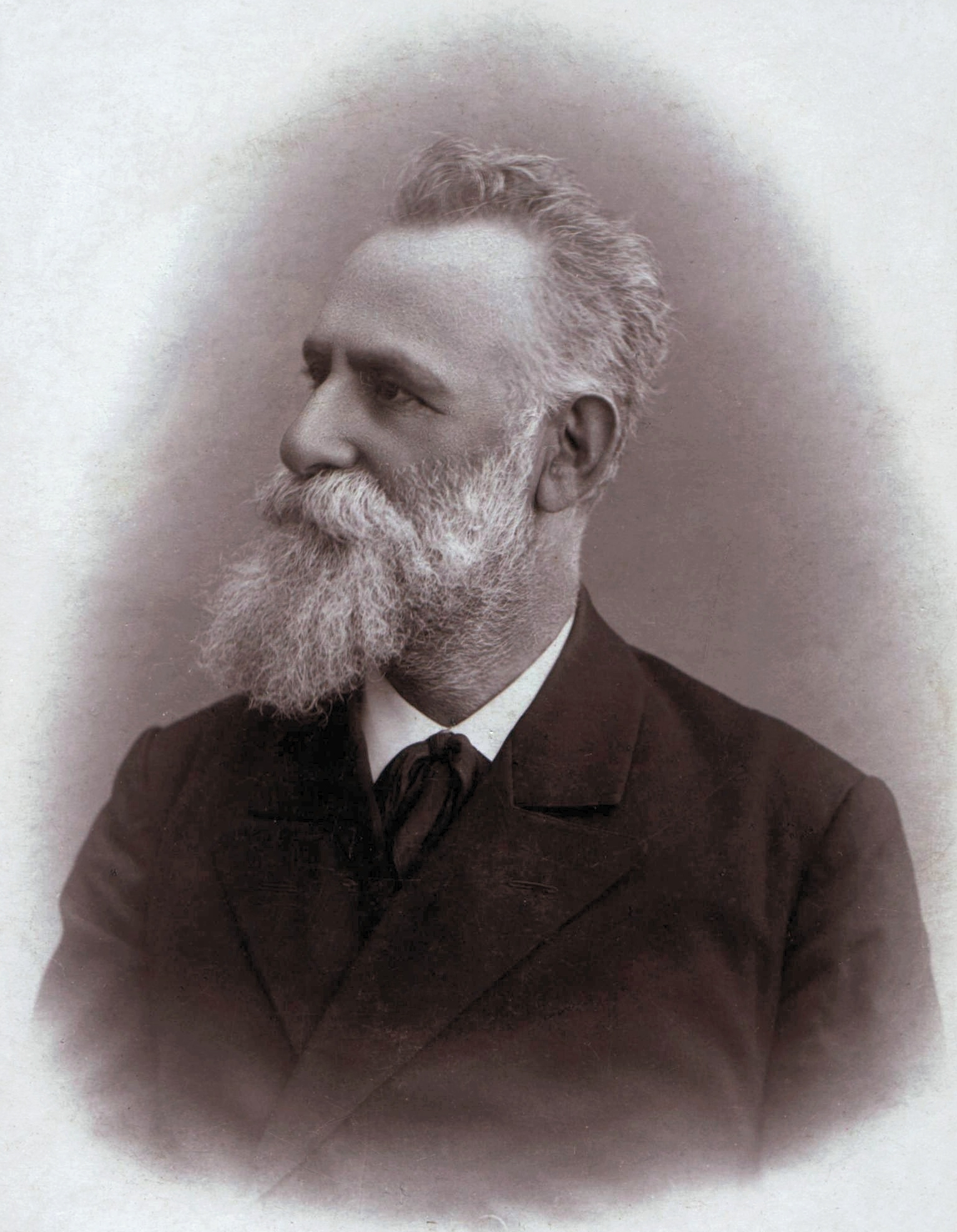
- Born: 16 April [O.S. 4 April] 1840; Bolnisi (Bolnis-Khachen) village, Tiflis Governorate (now Georgia)
- Died: 3 July [O.S. 20 June] 1911; Tiflis, Russian Empire
- Occupations: writer, educator, folklorist, historian, linguist and public figure

Ghazaros (Lazarus) Aghayan (Armenian: Ղազարոս Աղայեան; 16 April [O.S. 4 April] 1840 – 3 July [O.S. 20 June] 1911) was an Armenian writer, educator, folklorist, historian, linguist and public figure.

== Biography ==
Aghayan was born in the village of Bolnisi (also known as Bolnis-Khachen) in the Tiflis Governorate (now Georgia) of the Russian Empire. He received his early education in Bolnisi, and at the age of thirteen he enrolled in the Nersisyan School in Tiflis. He left the school after one year because of his family's financial problems. Aghayan traveled between Tiflis, Moscow, and Saint Petersburg. In Moscow he became a collaborator of Stepanos Nazarian, the founder of the journal Hyusisapayl (Aurora borealis), also working as typesetter.

Throughout his life he pursued many careers and professions. He was a hunter, a factory worker and a farm labourer before he joined fellow writer Mikayel Nalbandian in the Armenian cultural and intellectual revival of the 19th century.

In 1867 he returned to the Caucasus, worked as the manager of Etchmiadzin publishing house, and as an editor of the monthly Ararat monthly (1869–1870) of the Mother See of Holy Etchmiadzin. In 1870 he returned to Tiflis and dedicated himself to teaching. He taught in Akhaltskha, Alexandropol, Yerevan and Shushi, and supervised Armenian parochial schools of Georgia. As a teacher he supported the democratization of education. Aghayan demanded clearing schools from the influence of clergy. He is an author of textbooks for Armenian schools and works on education. He also collaborated on Aghbyur, an illustrated monthly for children.

In 1895 he was arrested on charges of belonging to the Hunchak Party, exiled to Nakhichevan-on-Don and then Crimea (1898–1900). He was then under the control of the tsarist gendarmerie until the end of his life. In May 1902, the 40th anniversary of his literary activity was celebrated. In 1905 he took part in the October rally in Tiflis, calling for the tsar to be overthrown.

He obtained great popularity in the sphere of children’s literature. Aghayan translated works by Alexander Pushkin and Ivan Krylov.

He died in Tiflis at the age of 71.

He was maternal grandfather of Lazar Sarian and Anatoly Eiramdzhan and father-in-law of the painter Martiros Saryan.

== Works ==
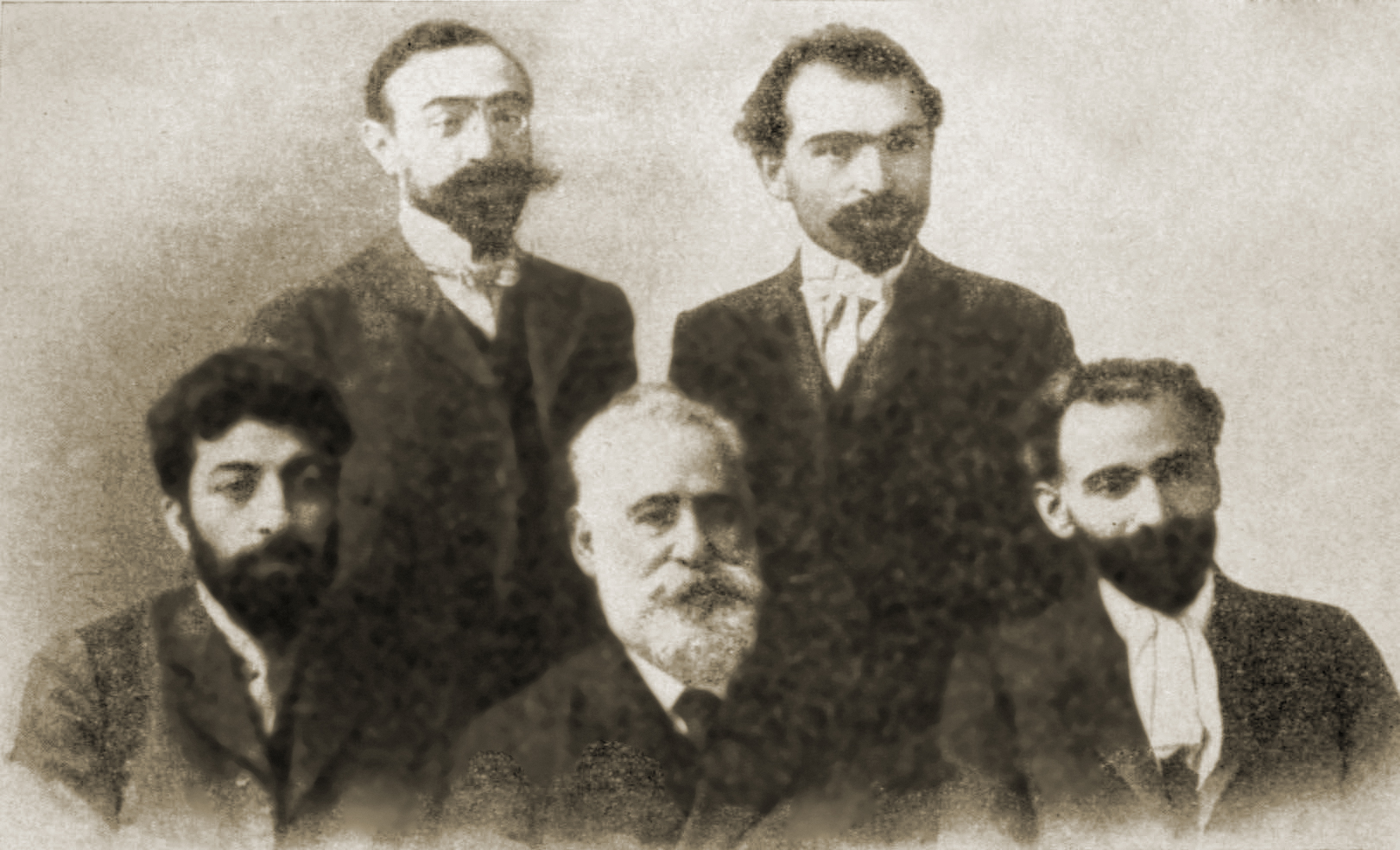
Vernatun members in 1903. Isahakyan, Aghayan, Hovhannes Tumanyan (sitting) and Shant, Demirchian (standing).

- (1867) "Arutin and Manvel". (autobiographical novel). Archived from the original on 2020-02-16.
- (1872) "Two sisters" (social novel)
- (1888) "Tork Angegh" (poems)
- (1893) "The Main Events of My Life" (memoirs)
- (1881) "Anahit" (tale)
- (1887) "Aregnazan" (fairy tale)
- (1904) "The Fairy Tales of Grandmother Gulnaz"
- (1908) "Arevik" (educational book)

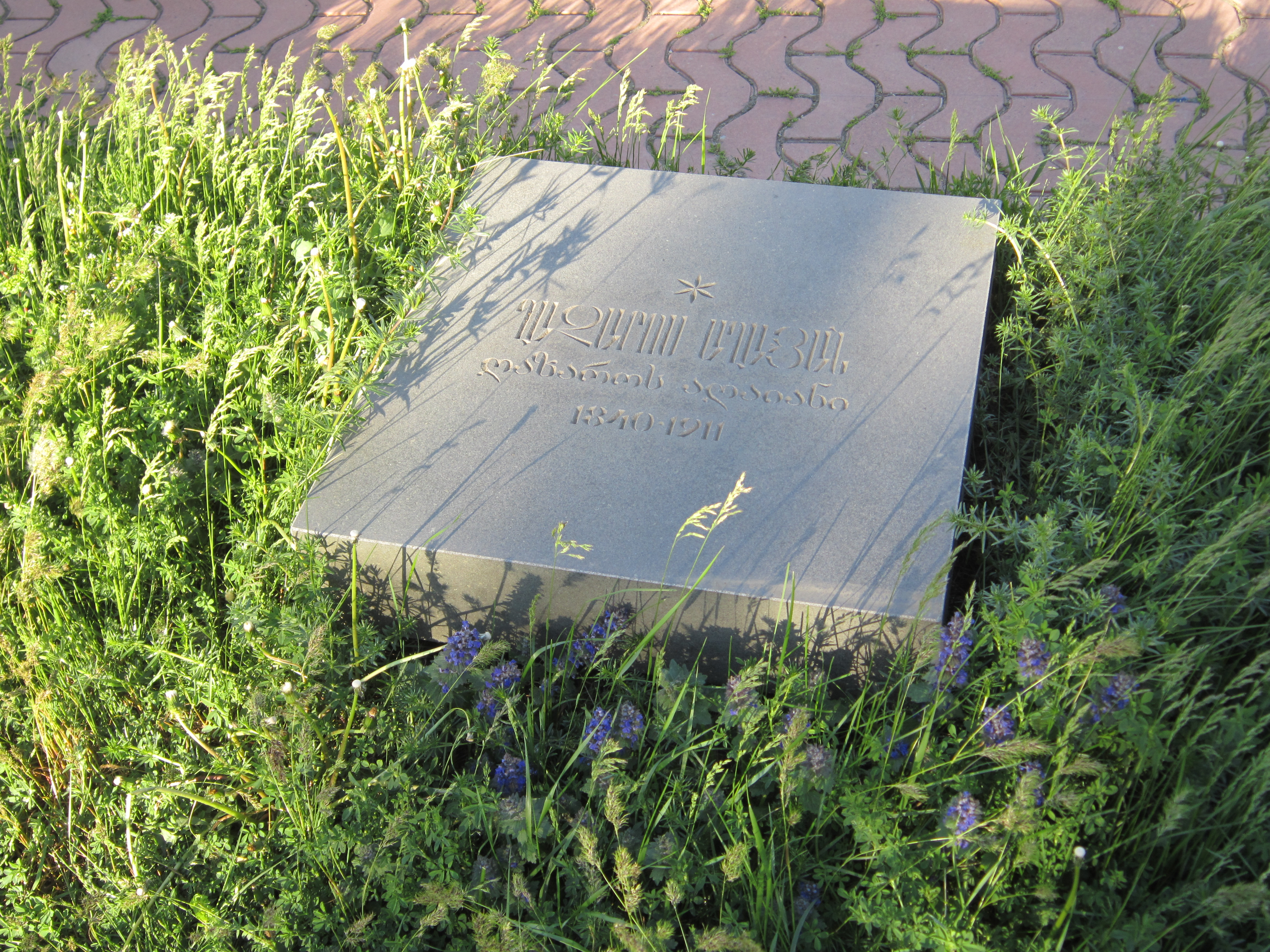
The tombstone of Ghazaros Aghayan in Khojivank

== Bibliography ==
- Collection of Works in 4 Volumes, Ed. and commented by A. Asatryan and others, Yerevan, 1962–1963
- Aghayan in Memoirs of Contemporaries, Yerevan, 1967. 529 pages.
- Tork Angegh, by Ghazaros Aghayan, trans. by Agop J. Hacikyan, 80 pages, Gomidas Institute, ISBN 978-1903656761
