= Theatre of Armenia =

Eurasian theatrical tradition in Armenia

Armenian theatre (Armenian: Հայկական թատրոն, romanized: Haykakan t’atron) dates to before Roman times and is one of the oldest Eurasian theatrical traditions. Alongside Greek and Roman theatres, it stands as one of the world's most ancient theatres. The ancient and beloved form of theatrical art is lyrical (profound) drama, which exerted its influence on the folklore of the Near East, Balkan, and Apennine peoples. Within this cultural context, Armenian folk and mystical drama, characterized by its dance elements, also took shape. Although the ancient theatre system has not been preserved, it has left its linguistic marks.

== History ==
=== Ancient Armenian theatre ===
Armenian theatre has its roots in the theatre of Ancient Greece, and it was a natural development of ancient religious rituals, when hired professional gusans (troubadours), sang the praises of the nobleman's ancestors in lengthy verses. Singers of lamentations or tragedians were known as voghbergus, and those participating in festive ceremonies were called katakagusan (comedians).

The history of Armenian theatre begins at about 70 BC. According to Plutarch, the first historically known theatre in Armenia was built during the reign of Tigran the Great. In Dikranagert he opened a great public theatre in 69 B.C., fourteen years before Pompey's first public theatre in Rome.

Tigran's son, Artavazd II, wrote several Greek tragedies, orations, and historical commentaries which survived until the second century A.D. Artavazd built the second permanent public theatre of Armenia in the old capital of Artashat. The tragedies of Euripides and the comedies of Menander were regularly produced there. He is considered the first Armenian playwright and director of classical Armenian theatre. Plutarch mentions that the Bacchae of Euripides, directed by Artavazd, was presented there in 53 B.C.

=== Armenian theatre in the Middle Ages (4th–15th centuries) ===
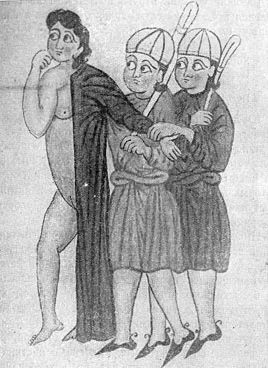
Armenian miniature with theatre scene

Following the adaptation of Christianity as the state religion in 301 and the strengthening of authoritarian rule, the church's opposition to theatre art became apparent. As an example, the sermons of Catholicos Hovhannes Mandakuni (5th century), which targeted theatre art, are well-documented.

Nonetheless, productions were presented based on the works of ancient dramatists such as Menandros and Euripides, in addition to performances by Armenian comedians and tragedians. Hovhan Mandakuni attested that, following ancient amphitheatres as a model, a dedicated theatre structure with distinct seating for women was also established. The popularity of theatrical performances led the clergy to incorporate theatrical elements into church rituals.

Great advances in every field followed the translation of the Bible (410 AD), including the theatre. But the advances Armenian culture came to an abrupt halt in the seventh century when the Arab invasion slowed all progress. Although a cultural decline existed during the eighth and ninth centuries, the theatre held on and survived. Armenian historians of the era indicate its living presence. Archaeological excavations made in the fort of Kaitzun Bert in Lori have uncovered numerous statues of actors and masks of animals and birds, which confirm the descriptions given by historians.

In the later part of the Middle Ages, theatrical performances were also presented in the realms of Vaspurakan, Ani, and Cilicia. It is believed that theatre troupes also staged performances on Aghtamar Island. On the walls of the 10th-century Aghtamar temple, two varieties of Armenian theatre masks, representing domestic comedy and clown characters, are depicted.

During the eleventh through fourteenth centuries, Armenian theatre continued to improve and enhance its dramatic styles in the Armenian-Cilicia area. The Mime Theatre cleansed itself of erotic excesses, the Tragic Theatre was enriched by employing topics from the epics, and the Comic Theatre satirized the social classes. The first surviving works of Armenian drama, including Hovhannes Yerznkatsi's dramatic poem and Arakel Syunetsi's "Adam book," also date back to this era.

A decline began with the fall of the last independent Armenian kingdom, the Lusignan dynasty of Cilicia in 1375.

==== Armenian theatre in the 15th–18th centuries ====
The emergence of the new Armenian theatre occurred in the 17th–18th centuries. Various theatre groups scattered all over Asia Minor, going to autonomous Armenian provinces. Charden, a French world traveller, in his Les Mimes de l'Orient, gives a detailed description of a performance he attended at the Armenian Mime Theatre in Yerevan, Armenia, in 1664. At that time Armenia was under Persian rule. Chardin's account reveals that the Goussan tradition was still alive with mime action, accompanied by music, singing and dancing, similar to opera.

Since 1668, Armenian school theatres, both ecclesiastical and secular, were established in cities where Armenian communities resided, such as Lviv, Venice, Vienna, Constantinople, Madras, Calcutta, Tbilisi, Moscow, and Doni Rostov. These theatres, with a classical orientation, expressed the ideals of the national liberation movement. Notably, the play "The Passion of Saint Hripsime," which was staged in 1668 at the Armenian school in Lviv, has been preserved.

In the eighteenth century, original plays and translations of European plays were published in Classical Armenian. They only attracted a secular audience, and as a result they were seldom performed, but were used in schools in the study of classical Armenian. Plays were written by the resident clergy and performed by the students. The pioneer efforts of the Mekhitarists provided a significant step in the development of the Western Armenian Theatre.

=== Armenian theatre in the 19th Century ===
==== Western Armenia ====
Already in 1810 in Constantinople, which was considered the cultural center of Western Armenians, the first Armenian performances are staged under the direction of Mandikyan. Hovhannes Gasparyan's "Armenian Theatre" (1846–1866), which preserved the traditions of the ancient Armenian theatre, had historical significance.

In 1855, the first western Armenian amateur theatre group was established by Srabion Hek'imian, and a year later, Beshigtashlian organized a group of amateurs who performed at the Lusavochian School. Their success led to the construction of new school auditoriums and theatres in various parts of Constantinople. Turks, whose introduction to Armenian theatre was at the homes of their Armenian friends, soon saw Armenian actors on Turkish stages as well. It is believed that Armenians played a principal part in the birth of contemporary Turkish Theatre.

Dramatists of the late nineteenth century set a strong precedent for those who followed. Major dramatists forged ahead with new styles and early traces of a new vernacular. Bedros Tourian (1852–1872), is credited with freeing Armenian classicism to the vernacular usage. In spite of his short life span, he wrote at least 10 plays and several poems, some of which have been lost in a fire.

The foremost satirist of the Armenian stage is Hagop Baronian. From a poor family with a minimal education, Baronian's brilliance enabled him to master several languages, reading the classics in Greek, French and Italian. His most famous plays are Brother Balthazar, The Honorable Beggars, and Abisoghom Agha. Like Molière, he satirizes human greed, vanity and hypocrisy, using his wit with devastating effect.

The most significant Western Armenian classical dramatist was Levon Shant (1869–1952), whose creative outpour spanned half a century with short stories, poems, essays, text-books and plays. (1869–1952) He was a diplomat and an educator, but his real fame rests on his powerful dramatic works. Shant was born in Istanbul and received his early education in Turkey. Later he studied at the Gevorgian Jemaran (academy) in Ejmiatsin, and at the University of Jena, Leipzig University, and the Ludwig-Maximilians-Universität München. Shant survived the genocide of the Armenians by the Ottoman Turks, because he was teaching in the Caucasus at the time. His most popular plays are: Ancient Gods, (1909) The Emperor, (1914), The Chained (1918), The Princess of the Fallen Castle, (1921), and Oshin Payl (1929). Like Shakespeare's chronicle plays drawn from English history, Shant's most popular plays chronicle crucial periods of Armenian history. He is the first Armenian dramatist to use expressionism and to expertly draw from mythology and blend it with realism, as illustrated in Ancient Gods. With the establishment of Soviet Rule in Armenia, Shant lived in exile in France, Iran, Egypt and Lebanon. When Lebanon became his permanent residence, he and his friend of Jemaran days, Nikol Aghbalian, founded the Armenian Jemaran of Beirut, where he was president for twenty years. In 1930, he helped the famed actor-director, Caspar Ipekian, in the formation of Beirut's first Armenian Theatre Group. In 1941, Shant again assisted Caspar Ipekian in the formation of the first permanent Theatrical Society in the Diaspora, known as the Casper Ipekian Hamazkayin Taderakhumb (The Caspar Ipekian National Theatre Group), and its first production was Shant's The Princess of the Fallen Castle. Shant's plays became a regular part of its repertory from 1942 until his death in 1951, when he was given a national burial in Beirut.

=== Eastern Armenia ===
The Armenians of the Caucasus enjoyed a greater freedom to develop their arts than did the Armenians in the Ottoman Empire during the early twentieth century. As a result, the development of Eastern Armenian Drama found its way in the Caucasus under different circumstances. Its founder, Harutyun Alamdaryan, organized an amateur theatrical group in Tiflis in 1834 and staged several European plays. His student, Khachadour Abovian, wrote the first play of the modern eastern Armenian dialect, Aghchegan Sera, (The Girl's Love), and it was performed by the group. Another student of Alamdarian, Galoust Shermazarian, wrote a satirical play, Karapet Episcoposi Ararknera (The Deeds of Bishop Karapet). After its performance, he had to flee the country because he had offended the clergy and government officials with its hilarious jabs at both institutions. In 1860, Gevorg Chimushgian organized a professional theatrical group in the Caucasus. Modern Armenian theatres were built in Tiflis, Baku, Nor Nakhichevan, Alexandropol, Kars and Yerevan. In less than twenty-five years, Armenian writers produced plays of literary and artistic value. It was a varied repertoire of original works and quality translations of European masterpieces.

The greatest Eastern Armenian playwright of the late nineteenth century was Gabriel Sundukian (1825–1912). Sundukian was born in Tiflis, and as a result of his studies in France and Russia, he learned French, Italian and Russian, as well as classical and modern Armenian. A brilliant man of letters, his plays offer a broad scope of human nature, its frailties and virtues. He was the first dramatist to deal with the Armenian middle and lower classes, and his play Pepo is among the most widely performed plays in Armenia. In 1921 the first state theatre was founded in Yerevan, Armenia and named the Sundukian Theatre, in his honor, His other major works include Embarrassment, Sneezing at Night is a Good Omen, The Husbands, Love and Freedom. Derenik Demirchian (1877–1956) and Alexander Shirvanzade (1858–1935) were playwrights who were already famous before the Communist take-over of Armenia. They stayed in Armenia and continued their creative work there for the rest of their lives. Demirchyan, a contemporary of Levon Shant, was a prolific novelist, poet and playwright. His most popular play, Nazar the Brave (Kaj Nazar, 1923), satirizes bourgeois morality and has been adapted very successfully to film. Alexander Shirvanzade, like his counterparts, wrote in many genres. His plays expose a society dominated by greed, superstition and hypocrisy, demonstrating a deep concern for truth and justice. His plays, Chaos, Namus, Evil Spirit, and For the Sake of Honor are still widely performed. His masterful use of realism pervades the conflicting issues in the drama For the Sake of Honor.

Soon after the Sundukian Theatre gained stature, many prominent actors from abroad, including those whose reputations had flourished in Western Armenia, went to Yerevan to join its repertory. They contributed to notable advances in its repertory, which included Armenian plays and translations of classical, European and American plays. Its modern repertoire is richly diverse with offerings of Armenian translations of world famous dramatists.

Actors whose laurels included outstanding portrayals of Shakespearean characters were Petros Adamian and Vahram Papazian. Adamian's specialty was the role of Hamlet, which he portrayed on the Russian and French stages in the Armenian language. Vahram Papazian is reputed to have played Othello 3,000 times in the Armenian, Russian and French languages. Papazian was a native of Istanbul and lived the second half of his life in Soviet Armenia (1888–1968).

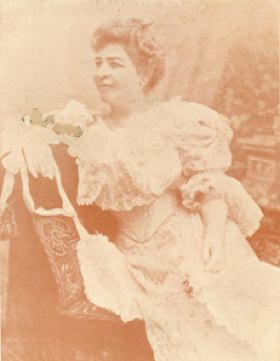
Actress Siranush

The "breeches" trend (actresses playing men's roles) infiltrated Armenian theatre when the actress Siranush (1857–1932) played the role of Hamlet in 1902. She played European and Armenian roles, as well as other Shakespearean roles, but her portrayals of Hamlet were a recurring part of her repertoire throughout her thirty-year reign on the Armenian stage. Her career on the Armenian stage lasted longer than that of any other Armenian actress. She and Vahram Papazian performed in Levon Shant's The Emperor in 1916 when it first appeared on the Tiflis stage. Papazian played Ohan Gourgen and she played the role of Theophano.

Soon after England had established a Shakespeare Foundation, a Shakespeare Center at the Institute of Arts was established in Yerevan, Armenia. Since the 1850s there have been at least 50 translators of Shakespearean drama, but to this day the translator whose excellence is still unmatched is the Iranian-born, Paris-educated career diplomat, Hovaness Massehian (1864–1932). In addition to Armenian, he was fluent in English, French, Persian, Russian, German, Arabic and Turkish. His earliest translation was of Hamlet in 1894, and during the years that followed, he translated Romeo and Juiet, The Merchant of Venice, Othello and Macbeth. When he died even more of his translations were discovered: Much Ado About Nothing, The Tempest, Julius Caesar, and Coriolanius. Massehian was a rare individual who served as Iranian ambassador to London and to Berlin during his career in government service.

=== Armenian theatre in 1900–1960 ===
During the years 1905–1907, Armenian theatre witnessed a significant upsurge. In the period from 1890 to 1900, Armenian amateur performances were organized in the working-class districts of major cities like Tbilisi and Baku. Subsequently, folk theatres were established, featuring a mix of amateur actors and professionals.

Public theatres emerged in Tiflis, including the "Avchalyan Auditorium" (1901), "Murashko Theatre" (1902), "Araksyan Havlabaryan Theatre" (1903), and the "People's House named after Zubalov" (1909).

In Baku, alongside the folk houses in working-class neighborhoods, Armenian drama groups also operated. Armenian amateur theatre troupes presented public performances in cities such as Yerevan, Alexandropol, Batum, Shushi, and Elizavetpol (Kirovabad). These theatres and troupes staged classical and modern drama works for the general public, offering affordable ticket prices. Several of these theatres continued their activities until the outbreak of the First World War in 1914.

Various actors and directors contributed to the operations of folk theatres, including figures like Poghos Araksyan, Amo Kharazyan, Grigor Ter-Grigoryan, Vahan Galstyan, M. Gavrosh, Davit Gulazyan, and others.

In the 1910s, new actors emerged as masters of the stage, including Hasmik, Isahak Alikhanyan, Petros Adamyan, Olga Gulazyan, Knarik, Mikayel Manvelyan, Arshak Mamikonyan, and later additions like Arus Voskanyan, Vahram Papazyan, and Hovhannes Zarifyan. The era also saw the rise of a new playwright, Levon Manvelyan.

However, the development of the national theatre was hindered by political restrictions, national pressures, a lack of material and organizational support, and censorship constraints on the growth of stage art.

The theatre experienced its most profound crisis during the years 1918–1920.

During the early twentieth century, productions of Shakespearean plays were performed by the Armenian Art Theatre in New York under the direction of Hovaness Zarifian until 1937 when he died. A decade later, Elia Kimatian, a former actor of the Zarifian group, directed and staged The Merchant of Venice in New York City with the Armenian Youth Federation's Theatrical Group which he had organized. He formed the group in the early 1940s and had a series of successes until the mid-1960s.

A major source of Armenian intellectuals in the historic past of Armenia have been works of William Shakespeare.

== Manuscripts in the Matenadaran ==
A wealth of manuscript information about the theatre is stored in the Matenadaran. Armenian theatre boasts a history spanning over 2000 years. Greek historian Plutarch testified that in 53 BC, Euripides' play "The Bacchae" was staged in Artashat, and Armenian Artavazd B composed tragedies. Armenian historians' works contain evidence of original folk theatres operating in Armenia in subsequent centuries, and some miniature manuscripts have preserved images of masked actors. One such valuable testament is the 1286 manuscript, which features a pantomime actor with a double mask on his head and belonged to Armenian King Hetum II.

Chronicler Hovhan Mandakuni from the 5th century, along with Davit Kertogh, and later Tovma Artsruni (9th–10th centuries), and others, provide significant insights into the theatre. Their accounts confirm that the theatre continued to thrive in the later centuries as well.

== See also ==
- Armenian folk music
- Armenian mythology
- Cinema of Armenia
- Culture of Armenia
- History of Armenia
