= Olga Gulazyan =

Soviet–Armenian actress

- Օլգա Նիկողայոսի Գուլազյան
- Born: 8 January 1886; Tiflis, Russian Empire
- Died: 27 May 1970 (aged 84); Yerevan, Armenian SSR, USSR
- Occupation: Actress
- Years active: 1900–1963
- Employer: Sundukyan State Academic Theatre
- Spouse: David Galuzyan

Olga Gulazyan (Armenian: Օլգա Նիկողայոսի Գուլազյան; 8 January 1886 – 27 May 1970) was a Soviet–Armenian actress of film and theater. Laureate of the Stalin Prize (1952) and the State Prize of the Armenian SSR (1967).

== Career ==
She was born on 8 January 1886, in Tiflis (now Tbilisi, Georgia). She graduated from the parish school of the Kharpukhi district in Tiflis.

She began her stage career at the age of 15. In 1900, she played the role of Nato in the play Another Victim by Gabriel Sundukian, receiving the author's encouragement. She began her professional career in 1901 in Petros Adamian State Drama Theatre in Tbilisi. Took part in performances at the Zubalov People's House, Araksi theater and in the Avjalyan auditorium. She later toured to Baku, New Nakhichevan, Moscow, St. Petersburg, Yerevan, Alexandropol and Shusha.

Gulazyan's distinctive art was formed as a result of joint work with great Armenian actors: Hovhannes Abelian, Siranush, G. Petrosyan and O.Maysuryan.

In 1926, Gulazyan moved to Yerevan and became the actress of the Gabriel Sundukyan State Academic Theater.

In 1955, she was elected deputy of the Supreme Council of the Armenian SSR of the IV convocation.

She died on 27 May 1970, in Yerevan. She was buried at the Tokhmakhskoye cemetery.

== Works ==
=== Film ===
Year	Title	Role	Notes
1926	Zare	Lyatif-Khanum	
1955	Ghosts Leave the Peaks	Asmik	
1958	The Song of First Love	Vartush, Varuzhan's mother	

=== Theatre ===
Year	Title	Role	Notes
1900	Another victim	Nato	
1922	Pepo	Epemia	
1924	Tartuffe	Dorina	
1927	Hatabala	Natalia	
1927	Uncle Bagdasar	—	
1929	A Profitable Position	Felisata Gerasimovna Kukushkina	
1933	The Imaginary Invalid	Tuanet	
1936	Namus	—	
1944	The Cliff	—	
1946	Without a Dowry	Kharita Ignatievna Ogudalova	
1950	Daring	—	
1952	Egor Bulychov and others	Ksenia	
1957	The trees are dying standing	Grandmother	

== Sources ==
- Olga Gulazyan. "Memories" (1957). Yerevan.
- Bagdasaryan N. Olga Gulazyan (Collection-album about the People's Artist of the Armenian SSR) (1979). Yerevan: ATO.
