= Maria Beroyan =

Armenian actress (1892–1960)

- Մարի Բերոյան
- Maria Beroyan
- Born: Mari Lianozyan; 8 February 1892; Tiflis, Tiflis Governorate, Russian Empire
- Died: 22 July 1960 (aged 68); Tbilisi, Georgian SSR, Soviet Union
- Occupation: Actress
- Years active: 1913–1960
- Spouse: Artem Beroyan

Maria Georgievna Beroyan (Armenian: Մարի Բերոյան; Georgian: მარიამ ბეროიანი; née Lianozyan; 8 February 1892 – 22 July 1960) was an Armenian actress. A longtime actress of the Armenian theatre in Tbilisi, she was named a People's Artist of the Georgian SSR in 1946.

== Career ==
Beroyan was born on 8 February 1892 in Tiflis. She made her stage debut in Tiflis in 1913, and from 1922 was an actress of the Armenian Drama Theatre in Tbilisi (now the Petros Adamian Tbilisi State Armenian Drama Theatre).

A character, dramatic and comic actress, she was especially successful in the plays of Gabriel Sundukyan — Salome in The Ruined Family and Khampera in Khatabala — and of Alexander Shirvanzade — Shpanik in Namus. She also appeared in the films Gikor (1934) and Pepo (1935), the latter directed by Hamo Beknazarian. She served as a deputy of the Supreme Soviet of the Georgian SSR.

== Awards and honours ==
- People's Artist of the Georgian SSR (5 March 1946)
- Order of the Badge of Honour

== Personal life ==
Beroyan was married to the actor Artem Beroyan, also a People's Artist of the Georgian SSR. She died in Tbilisi on 22 July 1960.
