= Elbakyan =

Elbakyan is an Armenian surname, people with this surname include:

- Alexandra Elbakyan (born 1988), founder of Sci-Hub
- Anna Elbakyan (born 1963), Armenian actress
- Armen Elbakyan (born 1954), Armenian actor, director and producer
- Arthur Elbakyan (born 1961), Armenian actor, theater, movie, television director, television host, producer
- Edgar Elbakyan (1928–1988), Armenian actor
