= Artem Beroyan =

Armenian actor (1878–1963)

- Արտեմ Բերոյան
- Artem Beroyan
- Born: 22 June 1878; Tiflis, Tiflis Governorate, Russian Empire
- Died: 10 January 1963 (aged 84); Tbilisi, Georgian SSR, Soviet Union
- Occupation: Actor
- Years active: 1899–1963
- Spouse: Maria Beroyan

Artem Konos Beroyan (Armenian: Արտեմ Բերոյան; Georgian: არტემ ბეროიანი; 22 June 1878 – 10 January 1963) was an Armenian actor. A longtime actor of the Armenian theatre in Tbilisi, he was named a People's Artist of the Georgian SSR in 1941.

== Early life ==
Beroyan was born on 22 June 1878 in Tiflis. After finishing a parish school, he worked in a metal workshop and then at the Tbilisi railway depot, taking part in amateur theatricals.

== Career ==
Beroyan made his stage debut in Tbilisi in 1899 and joined an Armenian drama company in 1901. From 1922 until his death he was an actor of the Armenian Drama Theatre in Tbilisi (now the Petros Adamian Tbilisi State Armenian Drama Theatre), and he was also involved in founding a revolutionary theatre in Yerevan in 1924.

He played more than 400 roles, especially in the comedies of Gabriel Sundukyan — Zambakhov, Zimzimov and Farsigh in Khatabala, Pepo and The Ruined Family — as well as Ferdinand in Schiller's Intrigue and Love, Iago in Shakespeare's Othello, and Satin in Gorky's The Lower Depths. In 1935 he appeared in Pepo, the first Armenian sound film, directed by Hamo Beknazarian.

== Awards and honours ==
- Honoured Artist of the Georgian SSR (1934)
- People's Artist of the Georgian SSR (1941)

== Personal life ==
Beroyan was married to the actress Maria Beroyan, also a People's Artist of the Georgian SSR, with whom he often performed. He died in Tbilisi on 10 January 1963.
