= Armen Elbakyan =

Armenian actor, director and producer

- Արմեն Էլբակյան; Армен Елбакян
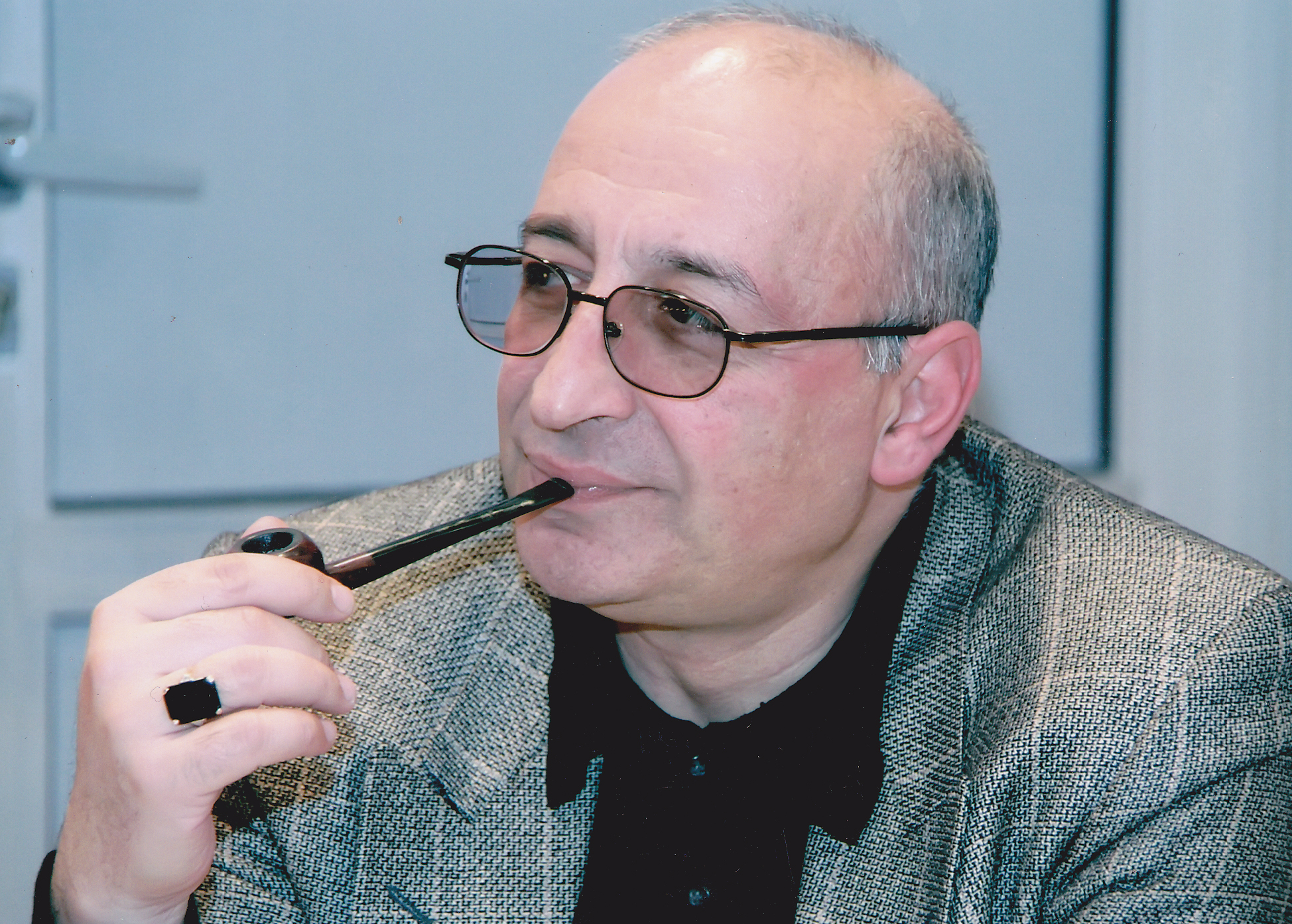
- Born: February 11, 1954 (age 72); Yerevan, Armenia
- Citizenship: Armenian
- Education: Yerevan State Academy of Art
- Occupations: Actor, director and producer
- Years active: 1973–present
- Spouse: Anna Elbakyan (m. 1981)
- Children: 2
- Parent: Edgar Elbakyan

Armen Elbakyan (Armenian: Արմեն Էլբակյան, born February 11, 1954) is an Armenian actor, director, and producer.

== Education ==
Elbakyan graduated from the Acting Department of Yerevan Theatre Institute in 1974, and graduated from the Directing Department of Yerevan Theatre Institute in 1981.

== Career ==
- 1975–1982 — actor for the Sundukyan State Academic Theatre of Yerevan
- 1982–1988 — director of the Sundukyan State Academic Theatre of Yerevan
- 1988–1994 — artistic director of the Paronyan Musical Comedy Theatre of Yerevan
- 1989 –2012 — Yerevan Theatre Institute
- 1994 — Founder of the Drama and Comedy Theater after Edgar Elbakyan
- 2000–2015 — Artistic Director - General Manager of the Yerevan State Marionettes Theatre
- Since 2012 — Head of Directing the Armenian State Pedagogical University Abovyan
- Since 2015 — Artistic Director of the Sundukyan State Academic Theatre of Yerevan

=== Director ===
- "The Owner" by Hrant Matevosyan
- "The Forty Days of Musa Dagh" by Franz Werfel
- "The Resistible Rise of Arturo Ui" by Bertolt Brecht
- "Play Strindberg", "Physics" by Friedrich Dürrenmatt
- "Don Quixote" by Miguel de Cervantes
- "The Zoo Story" by Edward Albee
- "Desire Under the Elms" by Eugene O'Neill
- "The Glass Menagerie", "Suddenly, Last Summer" by Tennessee Williams
- "Christmas at the Cupiello's" by Eduardo De Filippo
- "The Dragon" by Evgeny Schwartz
- "Trees Die Standing" by Alejandro Casona
- "Hills Like White Elephants" by Ernest Hemingway
- "Mean", "George Dandin, or the Abashed Husband" by Molière
- "Macbeth" by William Shakespeare
- "Premiere" by L. Roseba
- "Oh, these doors" by M. Fermo
- "Proposal" by Anton Chekhov
- "Dear Elena", "Garden without land" by Lyudmila Razumovskaya
- "The Dawns Here Are Quiet" by Boris Vasilyev
- "Hanuma" by Avksenty Tsagareli
- "Cavemen", "Would You Dance with Me", "You walk into the world", "Play Saroyan" by William Saroyan
- "Ruined Family" by Gabriel Sundukyan
- "Eastern Dentist", "Honorable Beggars", "Brother Baghdasar" by Hakob Paronyan
- "Belated Bird" by Anna Elbakyan and Armen Elbakyan
- "And paused a moment ..." by Edgar Elbakyan Jr.
- "Nazar the Brave", "King Chah-chah", "The Unlucky Panos" by Hovhannes Tumanyan
- "Meeting mice" by Atabek Khnkoyan

=== Actor ===
- Rostom — "The Owner" by Hrant Matevosyan
- Joe — "Would You Dance with Me" by William Saroyan
- Kurt — "Play Strindberg" by Friedrich Dürrenmatt
- Mebius — "Physics" by Friedrich Dürrenmatt
- Chatsky — "Woe from Wit" by Griboyedov
- Man — "Belated Bird" by Anna and Armen Elbakyan
- Jerry — "Two in the Zoo" by Edward Albee
- Georges — "Mystery Castle Entauz" by Agatha Christie
- Garcia — "Behind Closed Doors" by Jean-Paul Sartre
- Georges — "Taxi" by J. Renard
- Mercutio — "Romeo and Juliet" by William Shakespeare
- Jester — "King John" by William Shakespeare
- Antonio — "Cylinder" by Eduardo De Filippo
- Francois — "Oh, these doors" by M. Fermo
- Sergeant rubbed — "The Mousetrap" by Agatha Christie
- Evdokimov — "104 pages about love" by E. Radzinsky
- Nikita — "Cruel Intentions" by Arbuzov
- Sasha — "Natasha" by Arbuzov
- Dudley Bostwick — "Time of Your Life" by William Saroyan
- Simon — "Land of Nairi" by Yeghishe Charents
- Crazy Mozi, Osep — "Busted home" by Gabriel Sundukyan
- And so on — "New deoginez" by Gabriel Sundukyan
- Nico — "Eastern Dentist" by Hagop Paronyan
- Sacco — "Brave Nazar" by Derenik Demirchyan
- A. Zarabyan — "Hatsavan" by Nairi Zarian

== Awards ==
- 1988 — Winner of the Union festival play "Dear Elena"
- 1993 — Prize Vakhtangov for the best works: "Dear Elena", "Garden without land", Lyudmila Razumovskaya
- 2002 — Armenian National Award "Artavazd" and The Best Performance "Busted home", Gabriel Sundukyan
- 2003 — Honored Art Worker of Armenia
- 2006 — Armenian National Award "Artavazd" - The Best Performance "Man of La Mancha" Miguel Cervantes
- 2008 — International TheatreFestival «ARCUSFEST» Hungary - Best Actor
- 2008 — Armenian NationalAward "Artavazd" - Best Actor
- 2010 — Award Festival. A. Ayvazyan in the "Best Actor", "American adzhabsandal"
- 2010 — Was awarded the title of Professor
