= Azniv Hrachia =

- Ազնիվ Հրաչյա
- Born: 1853
- Died: 1919 (aged 65–66)
- Occupation: Actress

Azniv Hrachia (born Azniv Grigori Minasian; Armenian: Ազնիվ Հրաչյա; 1853 – 20 May, 1919) was an Ottoman Armenian actress. She was also the first Armenian woman to serve as a director.

== Early life ==
Hrachia was born Azniv Minasian in Constantinople. Her father died early in her childhood, which her contemporaries believed informed an "inexplicable melancholy" that coloured her temperament throughout her life.

From a young age, she showed an interest in the arts and acting. Educated at a school run by Catholic nuns, she was not an academic high achiever; she displayed more interest in her school's theatre group, which she successfully joined.

== Acting career ==
In 1869, Hrachia debuted at the Arevelian Tatron (Eastern Theatre), under director and actor Bedros Magakyan.

At this time, few women in the Ottoman Empire acted. The first actresses were from religious minorities, as Islamic sex segregation prohibited Muslim women from performing onstage, and acting was not considered to be a respectable profession. Nonetheless, women receiving payment for any type of work was associated with lower social classes across cultures. Hrachia's mother agreed to let her daughter perform on the condition she was not paid for doing so, though Hrachia accepted the wages in secret. Later, Hrachia wrote of the arrangement: "Why would I not take it? It was the money I had earned. It was my honest wages."

Early in her career, her close colleague, Petros Adamian, advised her to permanently adopt the stage name 'Hrachia.' Meaning 'eyes of fire,' the name had been bestowed upon her by audiences.

While working at the Eastern Theatre, she also joined Güllü Agop's theatre troupe. She typically performed in historical or patriotic tragedies, as well as French and Italian melodramas. She also directed some productions, earning the distinction of being the first Armenian woman to work as an art director.

Over her career, Hrachia developed a reputation for realism in her performances. Her acting style favoured believable reactions and natural body language. She also took great care with her speech, receiving recognition for her clear diction and use of tone to convey mood. Critics compared her realism to Eleonora Duse, an Italian actress similarly recognised for working to understand her characters' motivations.

Hrachia took a hiatus from acting between 1883 and 1893, when she briefly returned as part of an Armenian theatre troupe in Tbilisi and Baku. After being diagnosed with tuberculosis shortly into her career revival, she settled in Baku in 1896 and became an acting teacher for new performers, including Arus Voskanyan.

In 1909, she published a memoir ("My Memories"). Reflecting on her career in a speech on her birthday that same year, Hrachia noted: "Thirty-five years ago a young Armenian woman's appearance on stage was a great sacrifice. To be called a "theatre girl", and be ridiculed by the crowd, to withstand all this [was] possible only if one had a strong enough willpower."

== Personal life ==
Hrachia married a railway construction worker in 1875, with whom she had three children. Due to her profession as an actress, it took several years for his family to accept his intention to marry her.

== Death ==
Hrachia died in Dilijan in 1919 following a long struggle with tuberculosis.

== Select roles ==
Hrachia's notable performances included:

- Joan of Arc in The Maid of Orleans by Friedrich Schiller
- Sofia in Woe from Wit by Alexander Griboyedov
- Nina in Masquerade by Mikhail Lermontov
- Marguerite Gautier in The Lady of the Camellias by Alexandre Dumas
