= Arus Voskanyan =

Armenian actress (1889–1943)

- Արուս Ոսկանյան
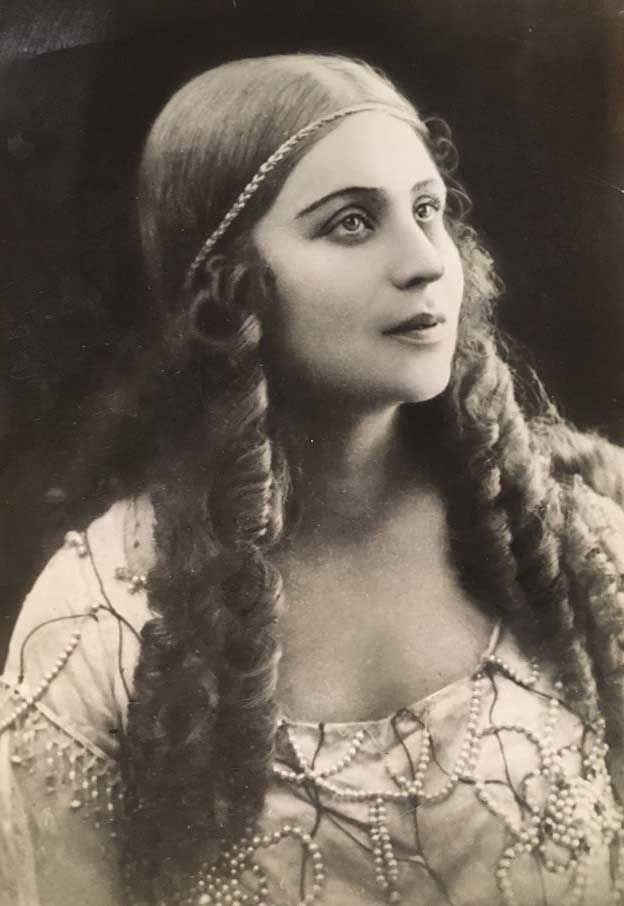
- Born: Arusyak Darbasyan; April 28, 1889; Constantinople
- Died: July 20, 1943 (aged 54); Yerevan
- Occupation: Actress
- Years active: 1908–1943
- Organization: Sundukyan State Academic Theatre (1922–her death)
- Known for: Originating classical roles in Armenian theatre

Signature
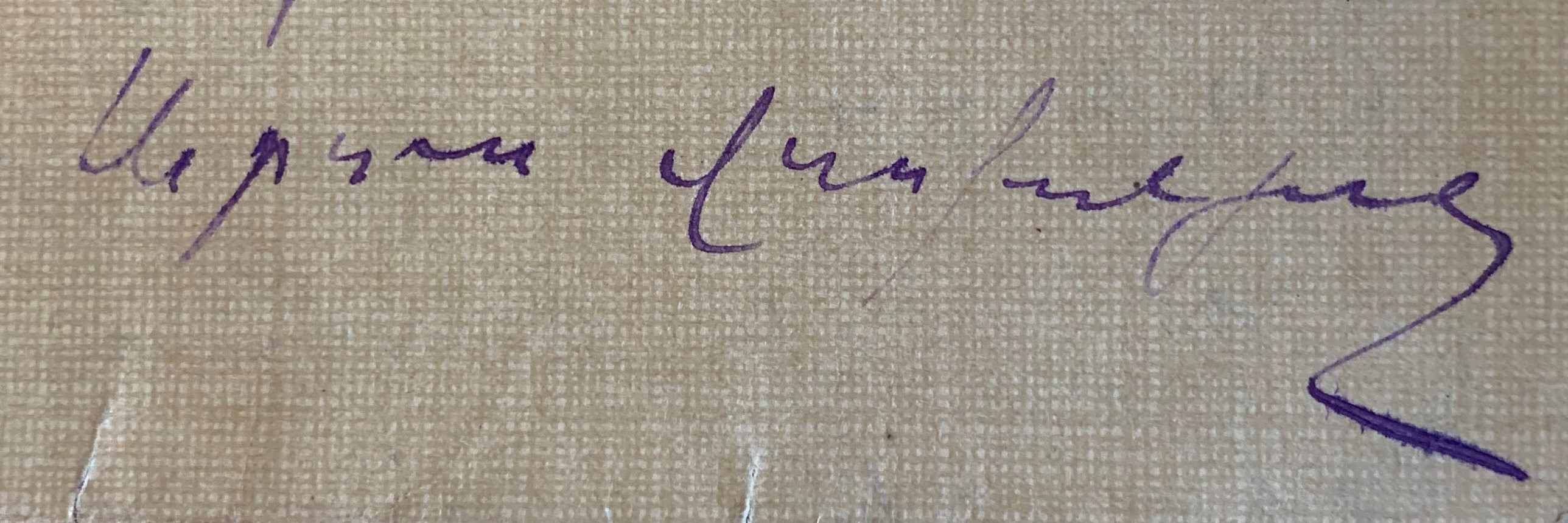

Arus Tigranovna Voskanyan (born Arusyak Darbasyan; Armenian: Արուս Տիգրանի Ոսկանյան; 28 April, 1889 – 20 July, 1943) was an Ottoman Armenian actress.

== Early life ==
Voskanyan was born in Constantinople (modern day Istanbul), where she also spent her childhood. Her parents, Araksya and Tigran Voskanyan, would go on to have two more children: sons Vaghram, who was a violinist, and Vazgen.

Voskanyan was exposed to theatre from a young age through her grandmother's sister, Epros Kyumrukchyan, and her aunt, Ripsime, both actresses. However, their careers had not been particularly successful, causing Voskanyan's parents to worry about the prospect of Voskanyan following their example. Nonetheless, Voskanyan developed an interest in theatre from an early age, with a particular interest in the careers of Sarah Bernhardt and Suzanne Desprès.

She received a primary education at the Esayan Armenian School, where she was taught by Zabel Sibil Asadour, and completed her secondary education at Saint Vincent College, a French school.

=== Name ===
Voskanyan's given name in also recorded in English-language as Arous. Her married name is sometimes recorded as Voskanian.

== Early career ==
Voskanyan began her professional life as a teacher at the orphanage of the Surp Pırgiç Armenian Hospital.

Not long after, she was encouraged to pursue her interest in acting by her brother's friend, Vahram Papazian. He urged her to accept an opportunity to play Emilia in a production of Othello. After the decision angered her fiancé at the time, Papazian, who had a romantic interest in Voskanyan himself, told her that any man who objected to her being on stage was "not worthy" of marriage.

She joined the production, which caused her fiancé to end their relationship. Her mother sent her to stay with an aunt in Bulgaria for a period of time, in a bid to deter her from acting.

== Acting career ==
Upon her return to Istanbul in 1908, Voskanyan, still interested in the arts, began attending plays by theatre troupes as an audience member. She became acquainted with actor Hovhannes Abelian, and left Istanbul with his troupe, the Abelian-Armenian Theatre Group, in 1909 to tour the Caucasus. After marrying troupe member Hosvep Voskanyan, she relocated with him to Baku and adopted the stage name Arus Voskanyan.

Actress Azniv Hrachia voluntarily took Voskanyan on as a student shortly after she settled in Baku. Hrachia was an advocate for proper diction and close attention to pronunciation when performing in the Armenian language; she also directed her students to pay attention to conveying mood through the rhythm of their speech. Voskanyan took Hrachia's lessons seriously, and used them throughout her career. Indeed, most critics would come to define Voskanyan's performances by her "mastery" of the Armenian language and her "sonorous" voice. Although she herself was a natural speaker of the Karin dialect, Voskanyan was an advocate for preserving a standardised Armenian language throughout her career.

Voskanyan performed with Abelian's group in Baku, as well as Central Asia and Iran, until 1916, when she joined the Armenian Dramatic Society. In 1921, she relocated to Yerevan to perform at the Sundukyan State Academic Theatre, which would open in February 1922.

Voskanyan developed a reputation for playing femme fatales in operettas, classical plays, and melodramas. She received the title of Armenian Soviet Socialist Republic (SSR) in 1927, and her career reached its height by the mid-1930s, owing to her well-received performances in classical plays. In 1935, she was declared the People's Artist of the Armenian SSR.

In addition to her theatrical performances, Voskanyan played the piano, oud, and mandolin. She was also an essayist on the topic of theatre, and occasionally directed plays. She read poetry to audiences, notably premiering new works by Yeghishe Charents. With lessons adapted from her own experiences under Azniv Hrachia, she occasionally mentored new actors.

== Later life ==
=== Second World War ===
From the commencement of the Second World War until her death in 1943, Voskanyan performed over 500 times for soldiers and hospitals. Ruben Zaryan later wrote that Voskanyan performed almost every night during the conflict. He believed she did so to improve her audience's wartime morale, approaching her work with "patriotic fervor." Her friend, sculptor Nikolay Nikoghosyan, similarly recalled that she worked "tirelessly" during the war.

Despite her dedication, Voskanyan grew more frustrated with her inability to contribute directly to the war effort as the conflict continued. Indeed, she had attempted to volunteer for military service, but local recruiters had denied her request to enlist. In 1942, she participated in a production of Hamlet alongside Vagharsh Vagharshyan, who attracted criticism for his interpretation of the eponymous role. She reflected on the debate: "[A] sword is hanging over the country's head, thousands of people are falling, the enemy is advancing, and we have gathered as a group. What are we doing? 'Is the actor interpreting Shakespeare correctly or not'?"

=== Illness and death ===
Voskanyan's last performance occurred 29 June, 1943. Twenty-one days later, on 20 July, she died of typhus in Yerevan.

News of Voskanyan's death shocked the Armenian people at a time when they were starting to grow resigned to reports of war casualties from the Eastern Front. Her funeral was attended by a "procession" of people in mourning throughout Yerevan. Mourners including Rouzan Alaverdyan, a student at Yerevan Polytechnic Institute who later became the architect of a new Sundukyan Theater building, approached the car carrying Voskanyan's coffin: "She was the people's actress, so let the people bury her." The funeral organisers acquiesced; Alaverdyan and other student-aged mourners carried her coffin to Avan Central Cemetery, where Voskanyan is buried.

== Personal life ==
=== Family ===
Voskanyan had one child with her husband Hosvep, a daughter named Siranush. Her granddaughter, Evgenia "Jenya" Mkrtumyan, also became an actress, performing at the Sundukyan State Academic Theatre and appearing in Armenian media such as Kargin Serial. Evgenia's daughter (and Voskanyan's granddaughter), Maya Margaryan, is a singer.

=== Personality ===
Contemporary actor Papazian opined that Voskanyan had a charm that "captivated" audiences. Ruben Zaryan described Voskanyan as intelligent and well-read. He knew her to hold "firm convictions" that she skillfully defended, but also felt she possessed a "rare" ability to listen genuinely to others, especially when she recognised they knew more about a topic than herself. According to her friend Nikoghosyan, Voskanyan was notably sensitive to the sadness of others; he opined that "her heart absorbed all the suffering around her."

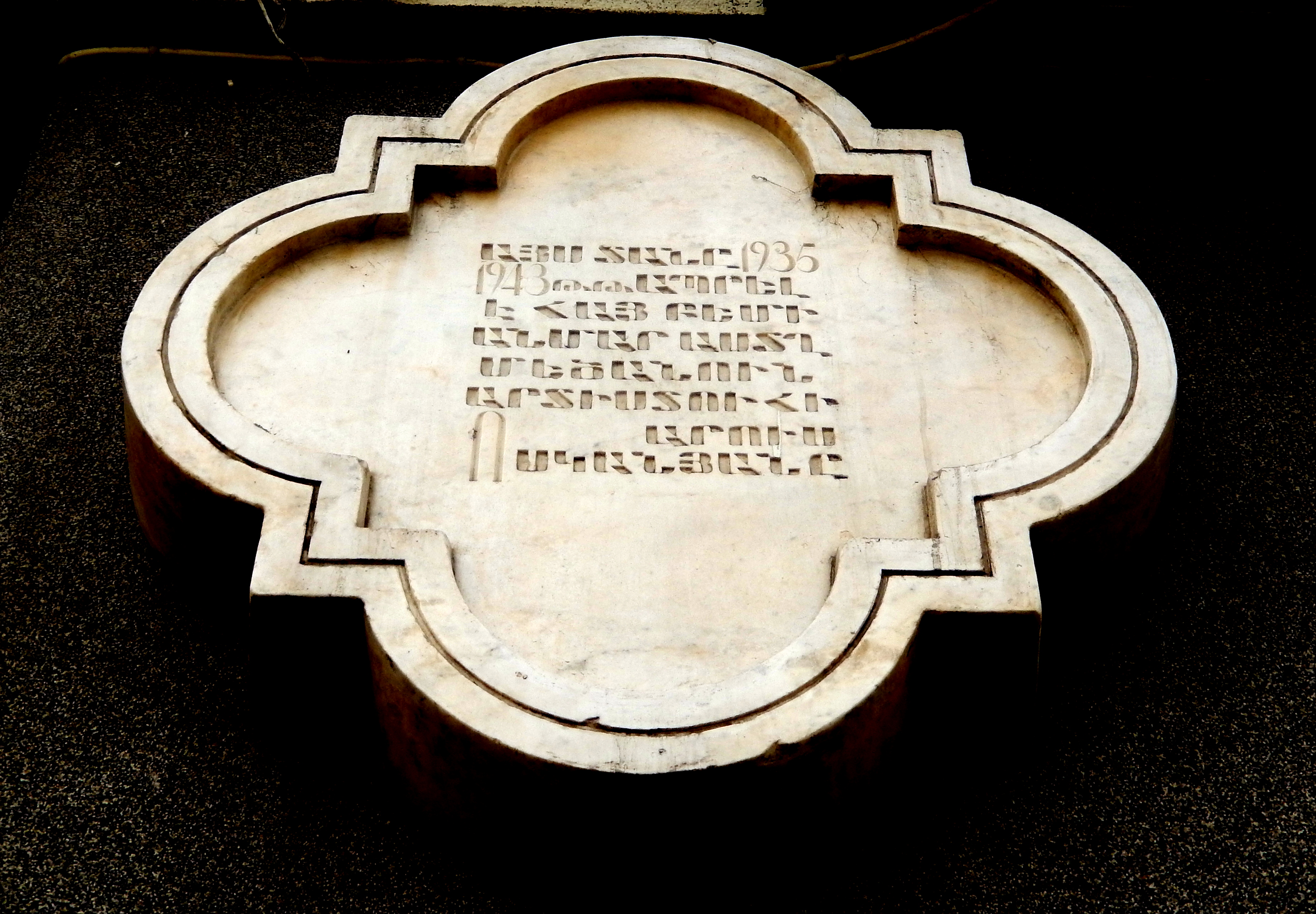
Plaque celebrating Voskanyan on Yerevan's Hanrapetutyan Street, where she lived from 1922 onward.

=== Relationships with Armenian artistic community ===
After moving to Yerevan, Voskanyan fostered close relationships with artists and intellectuals in the city, often hosting evenings of music and discussion at her apartment on Hanrapetutyan (Republic) Street. Attendees of these evenings included actor Hrachia Nersisyan, writer Vahan Totovents, poet Charents, and also Vahram Papazian, who had first encouraged her to pursue acting while in Istanbul. She was also a friend of Virginie Mamoulian, mother of Rouben Mamoulian, and valued reviews of her performances written by Rouben.

=== Relationship with Yeghishe Charents ===
Voskanyan maintained a close relationship with poet Charents until his death in 1937. He dedicated unpublished works to her, and opined that she was the "greatest actress" in the history of Armenian theatre.

While Charents faced harassment during the Stalinist repression of intellectuals in Armenia, Voskanyan hid his unpublished manuscripts in her wardrobe to protect them, assuming personal risk. At least once, she carried correspondence between cities on his behalf to circumvent surveillance of his mail; she also assisted him financially. Nonetheless, their relationship could be tested by Charents' drinking. On one occasion, Voskanyan was walking home with her friend Nikolay Nikoghosyan when a drunken Charents approached them, insulting Voskanyan until writer Axel Bakunts intervened. On another, Charents climbed on stage while Voskanyan was performing to kiss her hand; he later wrote her an apologetic letter.

In the last few years of Charents' life, he suffered from poor health and a morphine dependency. Describing her last visit to him, Voskanyan wrote: "He looked fragile but noble. He took some morphine and then read some Komitas. When I reached over to kiss his hand he was startled." She was deeply affected by his death, which she attributed to persecution by Stalin.

== Legacy ==
A street in the Malatia-Sebastia District of Yerevan is named after Voskanyan.

A 2022 Shoghakat TV broadcast described Voskanyan as "one of the best actresses" in Armenian theatrical history.

== Selected roles ==
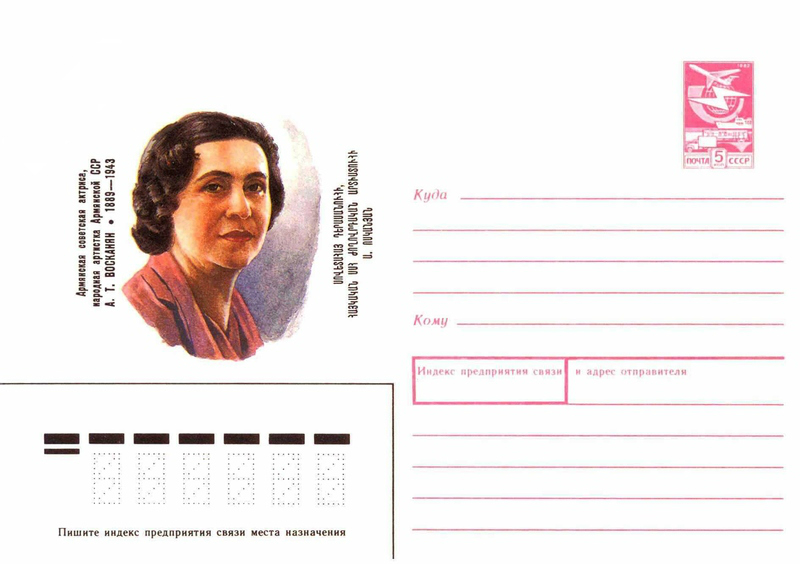
Soviet envelope commemorating Voskanyan (1989).

Voskanyan performed in over 200 roles. Her most acclaimed included:

- Amalia in The Robbers by Friedrich Schiller
- Anna in Anna Christie by Eugene O'Neill
- Anush in Baghdasar Aghpar by Hagop Baronian
- Kruchinina in Innocent Sinners by Alexander Ostrovsky
- Margarita in For the Sake of Honour by Alexander Shirvanzade
- Nora in A Doll's House by Henrik Ibsen
- Ophelia in Hamlet by William Shakespeare
- Parandzem in Native Country by Derenik Demirchian
- Salome in the one-act tragedy of the same name by Oscar Wilde

Voskanyan also originated several roles from the works of Shakespeare on the modern Armenian stage, including Juliet (Romeo and Juliet), Lady Macbeth (Macbeth), and Portia (The Merchant of Venice).
