= Zaryan =

Zaryan is a name meaning finder of wealth that could be both of money and knowledge. Notable people with the surname include:

- Aga Zaryan (born 1976), Polish singer
- Kostan Zaryan (1885-1969), Armenian writer
- Ruben Zaryan (1909-1994), Armenian theater specialist
- Vahram Zaryan, French mime
