= Bedros Atamian =

Armenian actor (1849–1891)

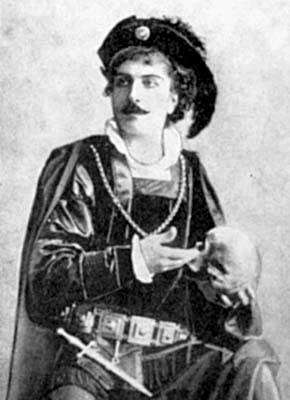
- Bedros Atamian in the role of Hamlet
- Born: December 21, 1849; Constantinople, Ottoman Empire
- Died: June 3, 1891 (aged 41); Constantinople, Ottoman Empire
- Occupations: Actor, writer and artist

Bedros Heronimosi Atamian (Armenian: Պետրոս Հերոնիմոսի Ադամեան in Western Armenian, Petros Adamian; December 21, 1849 – June 15 [O.S. June 3], 1891) was an Armenian actor, poet, writer, artist and public figure who worked in the Ottoman and Russian empires. He was famed for his Shakespearean roles, especially Hamlet, Othello and King Lear.

== Biography ==
Bedros Atamian was born on December 21, 1849 in Constantinople (Istanbul), the capital of the Ottoman Empire. Atamian's mother died when he was one and a half years old. He received his primary education at the school of the Holy Savior Armenian Catholic Church in his home neighborhood of Galata.

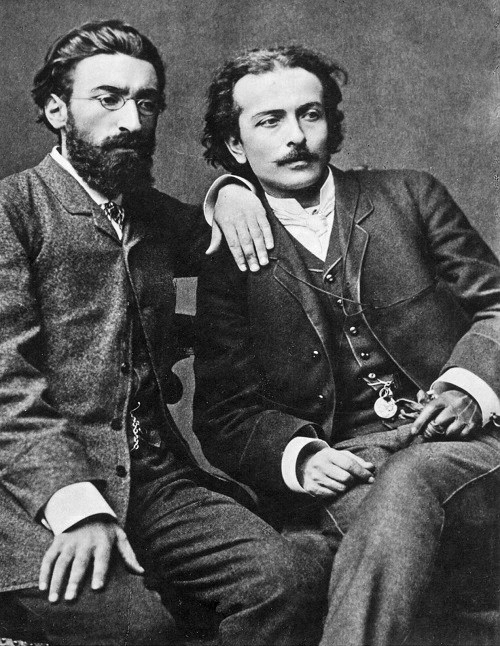
Adamian with the Armenian journalist Grigor Artsruni

He started his artistic career at the age of seventeen, playing a minor role in the play William the Conqueror at the Constantinopolitan Armenian Eastern Theater. On March 11, 1867, he played the role of Vardan Mamikonian's son in the play Vartan Mamigonian, p'rgich' hayrenyats' (Vardan Mamikonian, savior of the fatherland) by Romanos Sedefdjian. He was praised by the press for his performance. In 1867–1869, he performed with the Asian Company (Asiagan ëngerutiun), the Voluntary Company (Gamavor ëngerutiun) and other Armenian theatrical troupes. In 1870, he went to Nakhichevan-on-Don with T. Fasuladjian's group and returned to Constantinople in early 1871. From 1872 to 1875, he was a member of B. Maghakian's troupe, playing leading roles in tragedies and melodramas. During the Russo-Turkish War of 1877–1878, he performed a number of poetic recitations, particularly reciting poems by Mikayel Nalbandian and Raphael Patkanian extolling freedom.

In 1879, he was hired by the Armenian Theater Board of Tiflis (Tbilisi) and the golden period of his career started afterwards in the Caucasus. He would abandon the historical plays and the French melodramas to enter the world of Shakespeare. Since 1879 he performed in Baku, Shushi, Alexandropol, Tiflis. In the 1880s, when the Ottoman Turkish reaction "held the national minorities in scorn", Atamian had an artistic tour in foreign (Russian and Ukrainian) cities, acting both in Armenian and French languages. In 1887 a Russian theatrical critic wrote about Atamian in Odessky Vestnik: "Not Salvini, not Rossi, not Possart, not Barna, and finally, no world-famous actor has given us such a pure and perfect Hamlet as P. Adamian did." In 1888 he returned to Constantinople. Among his best roles of that period are King Lear, Arbenin (Lermontov's Masquerade), Khlestakov (Gogol's Revisor), Mikael (Sundukian's One More Victim), and others. Nishan Parlakian credits Atamian with popularizing Shakespeare among Armenians. Being a "great Shakespearean actor" and the first Armenian scientific researcher of William Shakespeare plays, in 1887 he published the study "Shakespeare and the Sources and Criticism of His Tragedy Hamlet." He also made translations from Shakespeare, Victor Hugo, Semyon Nadson, and Nikolai Nekrasov.

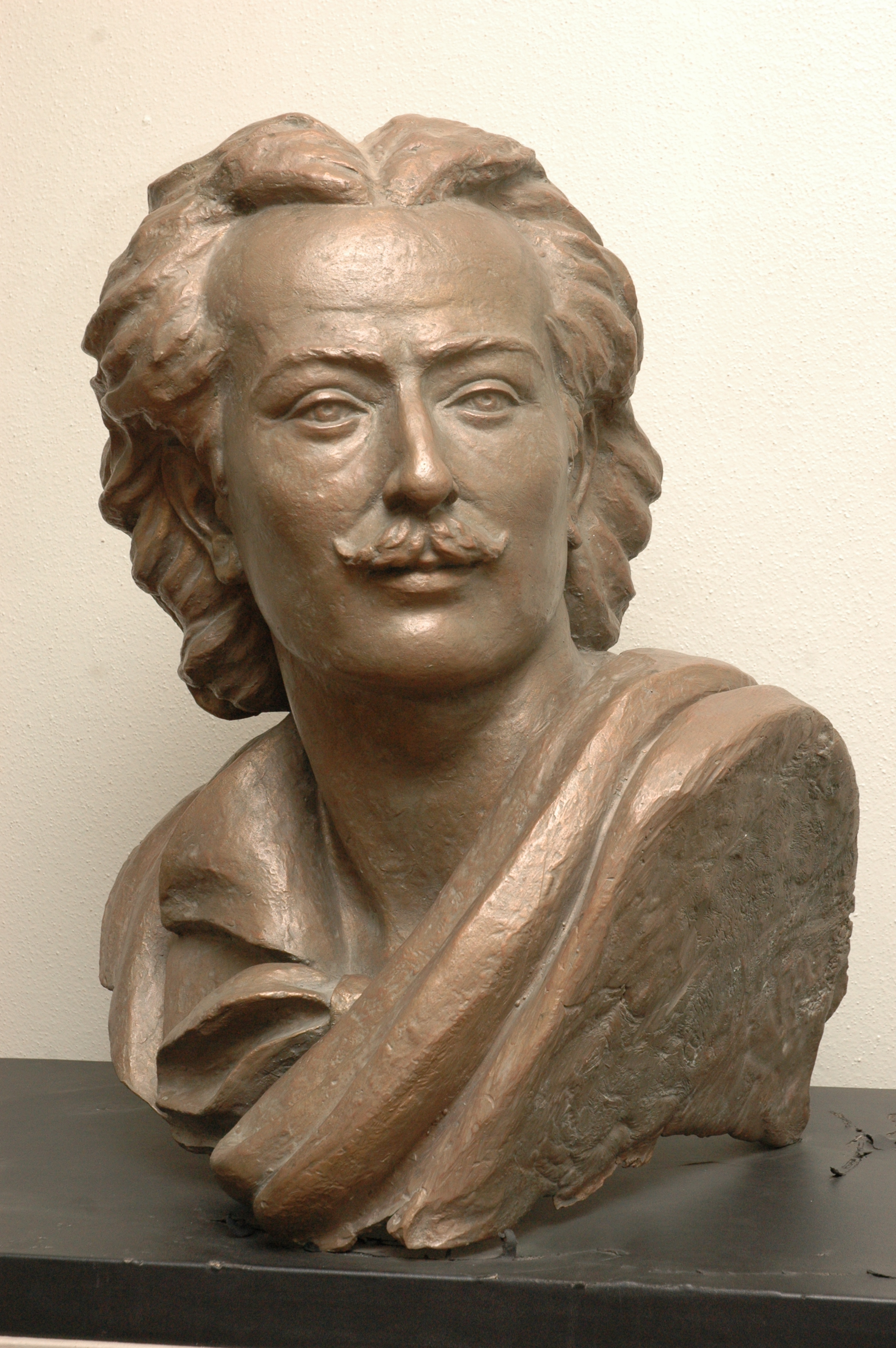
Bust of Petros Atamian by sculptor Ara Sargsian (Ara Sargsyan and Hakob Kojoyan Museum)

Atamian suffered from a throat cancer for the last two years of his life. He died in the St. Nicholas Russian hospital of Constantinople.

Siranush, Hovhannes Abelian, Vahram Papazian, and other Armenian actors continued Atamian's theatrical tradition.

The Armenian Drama Theatre of Tbilisi is named after Atamian.

== Selected works ==
- Kʻertʻuatskʻ ew targmanutʻiwnkʻ Քերթուածք եւ թարգմանութիւնք [Poems and translations]. Tiflis: Hratarak. S. Artsrunwoy. 1880.
- Shēkʻspir ew iwr Hamletʻ oghbergutʻean aghbiwrn ew kʻnnadatutʻiwnnerě Շէքսպիր եւ իւր Համլէթ ողբերգութեան աղբիւրն ու քննադատութիւնները [Shakespeare and the source and criticisms of his tragedy Hamlet] (PDF). Tiflis: Tparan Yovhannēs Martiroseantsʻi. 1887.
- V. Hatsouni, ed. (1896). Kʻertʻuatskʻ հṛchʻakawor derasan Petros Adameani (1879–1891) ev kensagrutʻiwn Քերթուածք հռչակաւոր դերասան Պետրոս Ադամեանի (1879–1891) և կենսագրութիւն [Poems of the famous actor Petros Adamian and biography]. Venice: Surb Ghazar.
- Ruben Zarian; Soghomon Tarontsi, eds. (1956). Erker Երկեր [Works]. Yerevan: HSSṚ GA hratarakchʻutʻyun.
- G. Kh. Stepanian, ed. (1959). Namakner Նամակներ [Letters]. Yerevan: HSSṚ GA hratarakchʻutʻyun.
