= Anna Elbakyan =

Armenian actress (born 1963)

- Born: Anna Abramyan; 5 September 1963 (age 63); Yerevan, Armenia
- Occupation: Actress
- Years active: 1982–present
- Children: 2

Anna Elbakyan (Armenian: Աննա Աբրահամի Էլբակյան, born September 5, 1963) is an Armenian actress. She became an Armenian star after headlining the drama Where Have You Been, Man of God? (TV mini-series)(1992).

== Biography ==
- In 1982 she graduated from the Actors Studio of the Sundukyan State Academic Theatre of Yerevan
- In 1986, she graduated from Yerevan State University Faculty of Social Sciences, specialty art
- In 1982 to 1990, 1998 to 2003, and 2008 to present, actress of the Sundukyan State Academic Theatre of Yerevan
- From 2000 to present, actress of the Drama and Comedy Theater after Edgar Elbakyan
- from 2000 to present, director, and from 2005, chief director of the Yerevan State Marionettes Theater
- Member of the Union of Cinematographers of RA
- Member of the Union of Theatre Workers of RA

== Filmography ==
- The White Bone
- Face-to-wall
- Where have you been, man of God?
- The Thief
- Silhouette
- Yerevan jan
- Tavern
- Elegy

Television

- Irene - "The Eighth Day of the Creator" Kacha.
- Girl - "Detention House Charents" Charents
- Astghik "Higher Hell" by S. Papazian
- Mary - "Ghosts" by E. de Filippo
- Princess - "Crystal Love" L. Ustinov
- Marguerite - "Mefistofele" by S. Aleshin
- Solange - "The Sixth Floor."

== Theatre work ==
=== Actor's work ===
- Juliet - " Forty Days of Musa Dagh" by Franz Werfel.
- Abbey - "Desire Under the Elms" Eugene O'Neill.
- Lyalya - "Dear Elena" Lyudmila Razumovskaya.
- Fanshetta - "Crazy Day or The Marriage of Figaro" by Pierre de Beaumarchais 1985
- Valya - "The Bride of the North" J. Haroutunian.
- Tatiana - "Finding Joy" Viktor Rozov.
- Baiba - "Blow wind" John Rainis.
- Author - "The Resistible Rise of Arturo Ui" Bertolt Brecht.
- Armanda - "Life of Moliere," Mikhail Bulgakov.
- Elsa - "Time of Your Life" by William Saroyan.
- Agapi - "American adzhabsandal" Agassi Ayvazian.
- Tom, Kitty - "Will you dance with me?" Based on the plays and short stories by William Saroyan.
- Fat - "Red lights" Lily Elbakyan.
- Katherine - "Suddenly, Last Summer" Tennessee Williams.
- Alice - "Play Strindberg" Friedrich Dürrenmatt.
- Maryam - "Belated bird" Author Anna and Armen Elbakyan.
- Elmira - "Tartuffe ou L'Imposteur" by Molière.
- Helen - "Oscar" by Claude Magnier 1996
- Cordelia - "King Lear" by William Shakespeare 1996
- Agnes - "Bowl of Kindness" by William Saroyan.
- Queen - "The Cave Dwellers" by William Saroyan.
- Willie, Kitty, Jig - "Willie, Kitty, Jig ..." Tennessee Williams, Ernest Hemingway, William Saroyan.

=== Directing the work ===
Yerevan State Marionettes Theatre

- "The Princess and the Pea " Hans Christian Andersen 2010
- "Thumbelina" Hans Christian Andersen 2008
- "How brave rooster won a fox" is based on Russian folk tales in 2007
- "Star of Hope" in the Biblical explanation of 2005
- "A true friend" - R. Marukhyan 2002
- "Creation of Peace" based on the Bible in 2002
- "Winter's Tale" - Anna Elbakyan 2000

== Prizes and awards ==
- 2012 Armenian National Film Academy Award "Hayak" - the Best Actress
- 2011 People of the Year 2010 «LUXURY» - the Best Actress
- 2008 Armenian National Theater Academy Award "Artavazd" - the Best Actress
- 2006 Prize of the Ministry of Culture of Armenia "Artist" - the Best Actress
- 2005 Armenian National Theater Academy Award "Artavazd" - the Best Actress
- 2001 "Gold Medal" of the Ministry of Culture of Armenia
