= Yerevan State Marionettes Theatre =

Armenian theater

Yerevan State Marionette Theatre
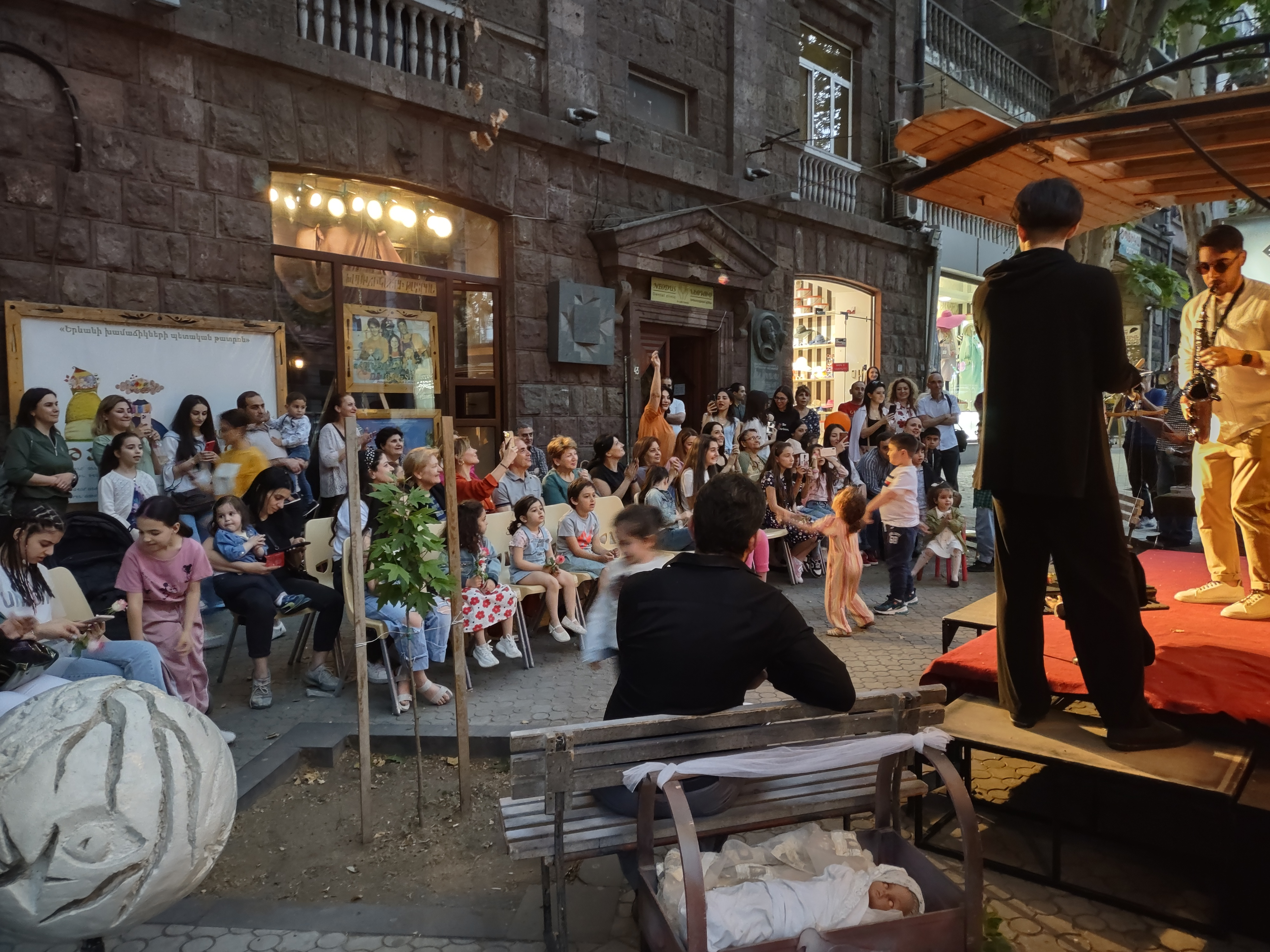
- The State Marionette Theatre in Armenia
- Interactive map of Yerevan State Marionette Theatre
- Address: 43 Mashtots Avenue; Yerevan 0009; Armenia
- Coordinates: 40.190010°N 44.518099°E
- Owner: Government of Armenia
- Operator: Armen Elbakyan
- Capacity: 70 seats
- Type: Marionette Theatre

Construction
- Opened: 1987
- Reopened: 2001

Website
- Yerevan State Marionettes Theatre on Facebook

The Yerevan State Marionette Theater (Armenian: Երևանի Մարիոնետների պետական թատրոն) was founded in 1987. It was the third one in the territory of the former USSR (after similar theaters of Leningrad, now St Petersburg and Tbilisi) and the first one, which staged performances both for adults and for children.

The first performance was "The three piglets". After the first success there were difficulties both in the artistic and financial life of the theater.

Between 1996 and 2000 the theatre was closed. This art center had a new ascent in December 2000, when the Theater was reopened and Armen Elbakyan became the director. The flow of new creative forces took place, the repertoire was enriched with new and successful performances:

Now there are 24 performances in the repertoire of the theater. There are not only puppet performances but also shows with actors and puppets acting at the same time on the stage. The topics and the puppets of the performances are created with consideration of national traditions and national coloring. The directors of the theatre stage not only national but also foreign stories. The performances are very popular in national audiences and also the foreign community of Armenia. Even tourists very often visit the theatre.

The artistic director of the theater is the RA Honored master of Art Armen Elbakyan, the chief director is the RA Honored artist Anna Elbakyan.

== Repertoire ==
- "The Adventures of Tom Sawyer" Mark Twain (2015)
- "Karlsson-on-the-Roof" Astrid Lindgren (2014)
- "Alice's Adventures in Wonderland" Lewis Carroll (2013)
- "The Dog and the Cat" by Hovhannes Tumanyan(2013)
- "Hansel and Gretel" Brothers Grimm (2012)
- "Buratino" Aleksey Nikolayevich Tolstoy 2012
- "The Princess and the Pea" Hans Christian Andersen (2010)
- "Thumbelina" Hans Christian Andersen (2008)
- "Nazar the Brave" Hovhannes Tumanyan (2007)
- "How brave rooster won a fox" is based on Russian folk tales in (2007)
- "King Chah-chah", "The Unlucky Panos" by Hovhannes Tumanyan (2007)
- "Don Quixote" by Miguel de Cervantes (2005)
- "Star of Hope" in the Biblical explanation of (2005)
- "You walk into the world" William Saroyan (2004)
- "Meeting mice" Atabek Khnkoyan (2003)
- "Little Red Riding Hood" Charles Perrault (2002)
- "A true friend" - R. Marukhyan (2002)
- "Creation of Peace" based on the Bible in (2002)
- "Winter's Tale" - Anna Elbakyan (2000)
