= Ruben Zaryan =

Soviet Armenian theatre specialist

Ruben Varosi Zaryan (Zarian, September 14 [O.S. September 1], 1909, Alexandropol – 1994) was a Soviet Armenian theatre specialist, Doctor of Art history, Professor. He was awarded the title Honored worker of Arts of the Armenian SSR, the State Prize of the Armenian SSR, and various medals.

Zaryan finished the Yerevan State University in 1936. He is the author of "The struggle for Russian dramaturgy at Armenian theatre", "Theatral portraits", "Siranuysh", "Shakespeare of Adamyan" and other books. Since 1958 he was director of Armenian SSR Institute of Arts.
