= Petros Adamian Tbilisi State Armenian Drama Theatre =

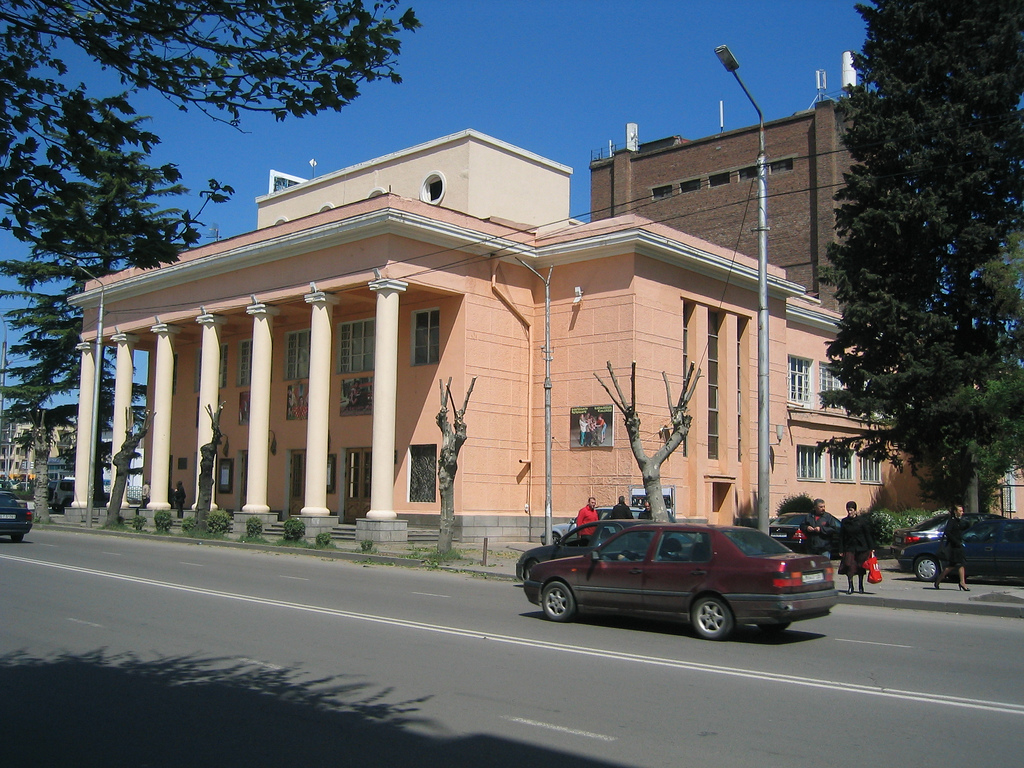
- Pedros Adamian Armenian Theatre
- Interactive map of Petros Adamian Tbilisi State Armenian Drama Theatre
- Address: Avlabari district of Tbilisi; Georgia
- Coordinates: 41°41′30″N 44°48′59″E

Construction
- Opened: 1858
- Rebuilt: 1936

Website
- www.tbilarmtheatre.ge

Petros Adamian Tbilisi State Armenian Drama Theatre (Armenian: Ստեփան Շահումյանի անվան հայկական պետական թատրոն Georgian: პეტროს ადამიანის სახელობის თბილისის სახემწიფო სომხური დრამატული თეატრი) was established in 1858 by the Armenian theater activist Gevorg Chmshkyan. Armenian writer Gabriel Sundukyan was among the supporters of theater.

== History ==
The first staging was "Haji Suleyman". From 1922 to 1936 the theatre's name was "Artistic theatre". In 1936 a new theatre building was finished which was named after Bolshevik Stepan Shahumian. The first performance was Mkrtich (Nikita) Djanan's performance "Shahname". Petros Adamian, Siranoush, Vahram Papazian, Hovhannes Abelian, Olga Maysourian, Isaac Alikhanian, Mariam Mojorian, Artem and Maria Beroians, Babken Nersesian, directors: Arshak Bourdjalian, Leon Kalantar, Roman Matiashvili, Robert Yegian worked at the theatre. Aram Khachaturian, Armen Tigranian, Alexander Spendiarian, and others wrote music for the theatre.

Nowadays Peter Adamian Tbilisi State Armenian Drama Theatre is the main cultural and public center of the Armenian-Georgian community.

== Gallery ==
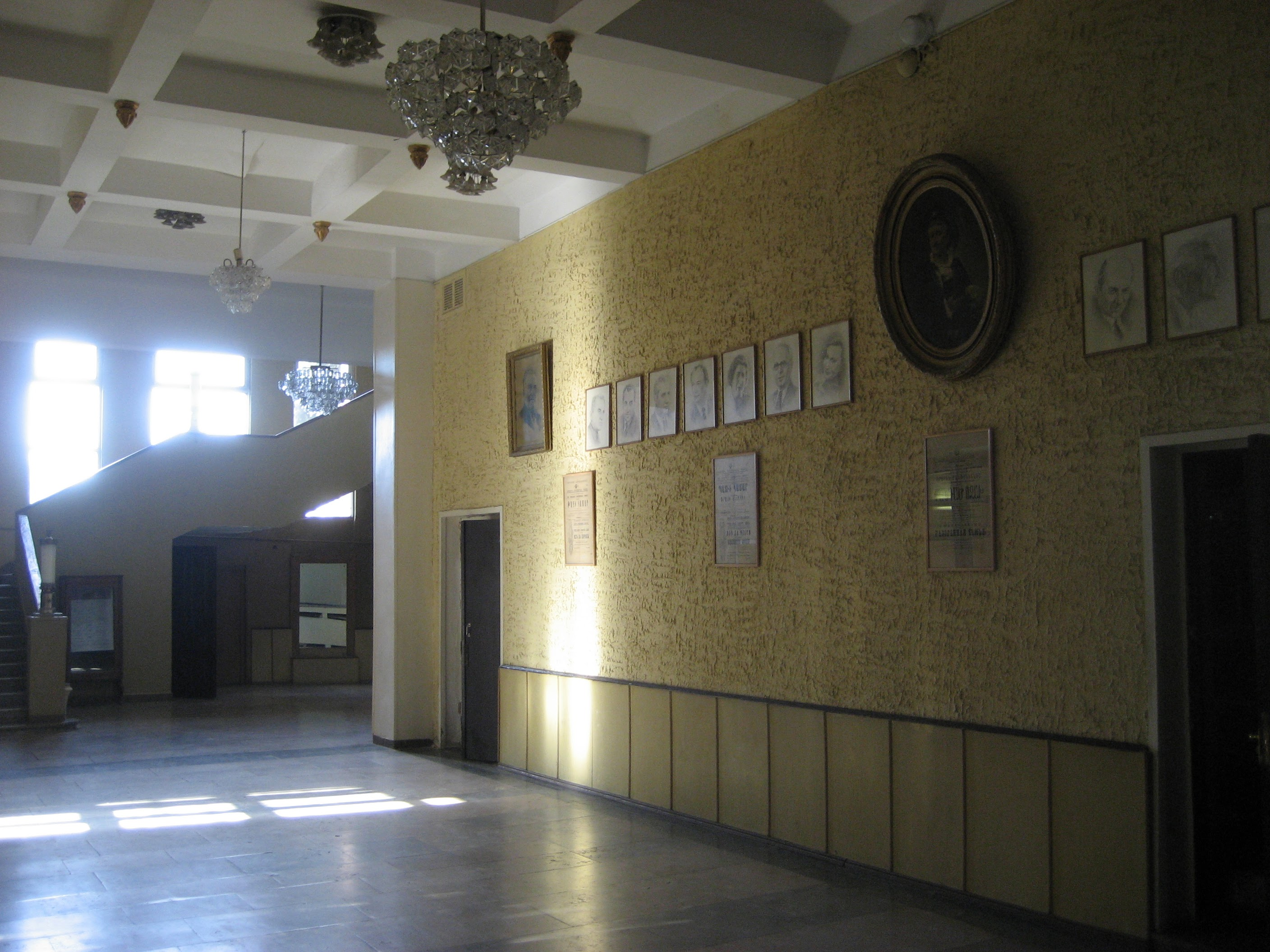
Lobby

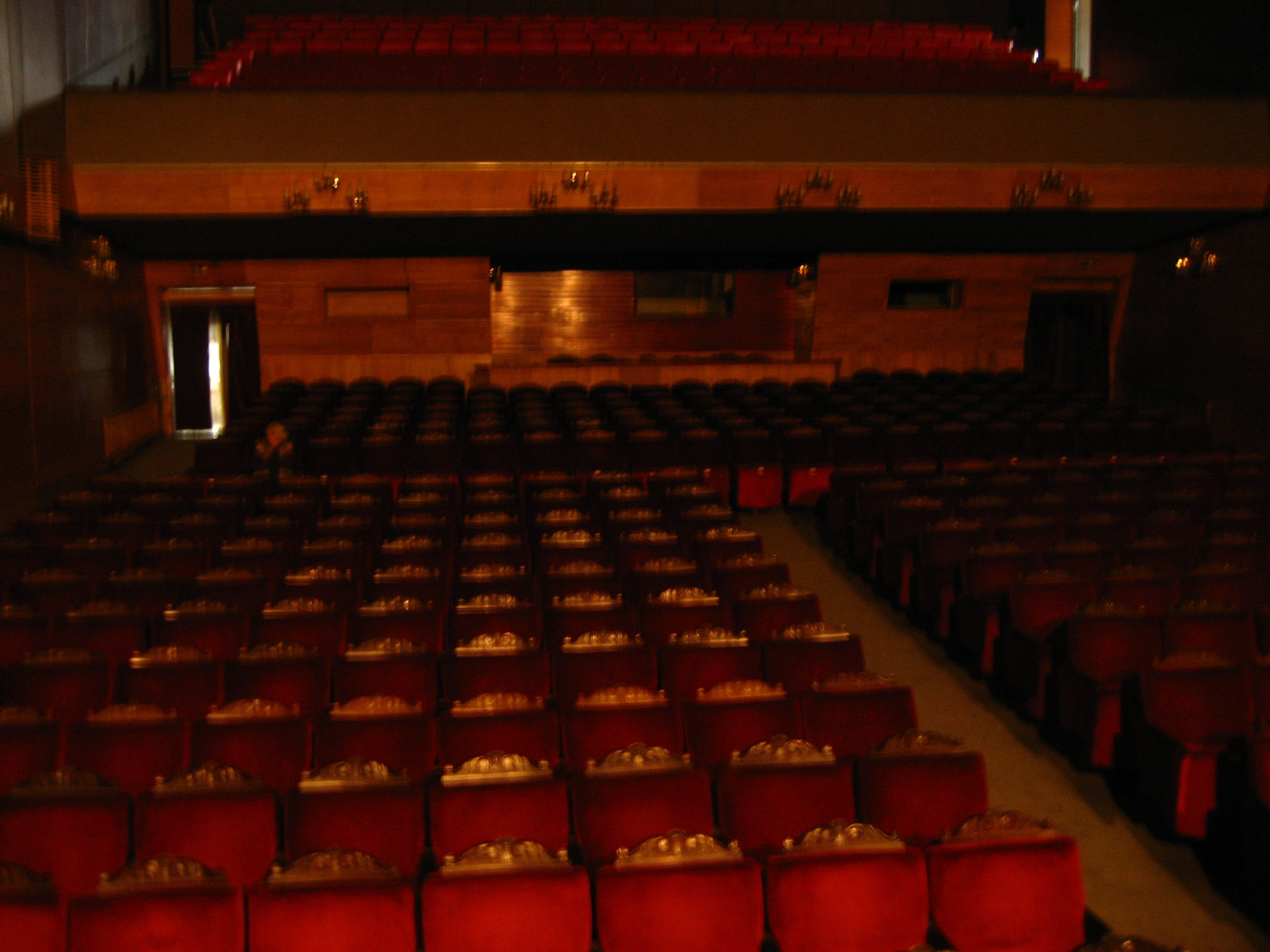
Auditorium

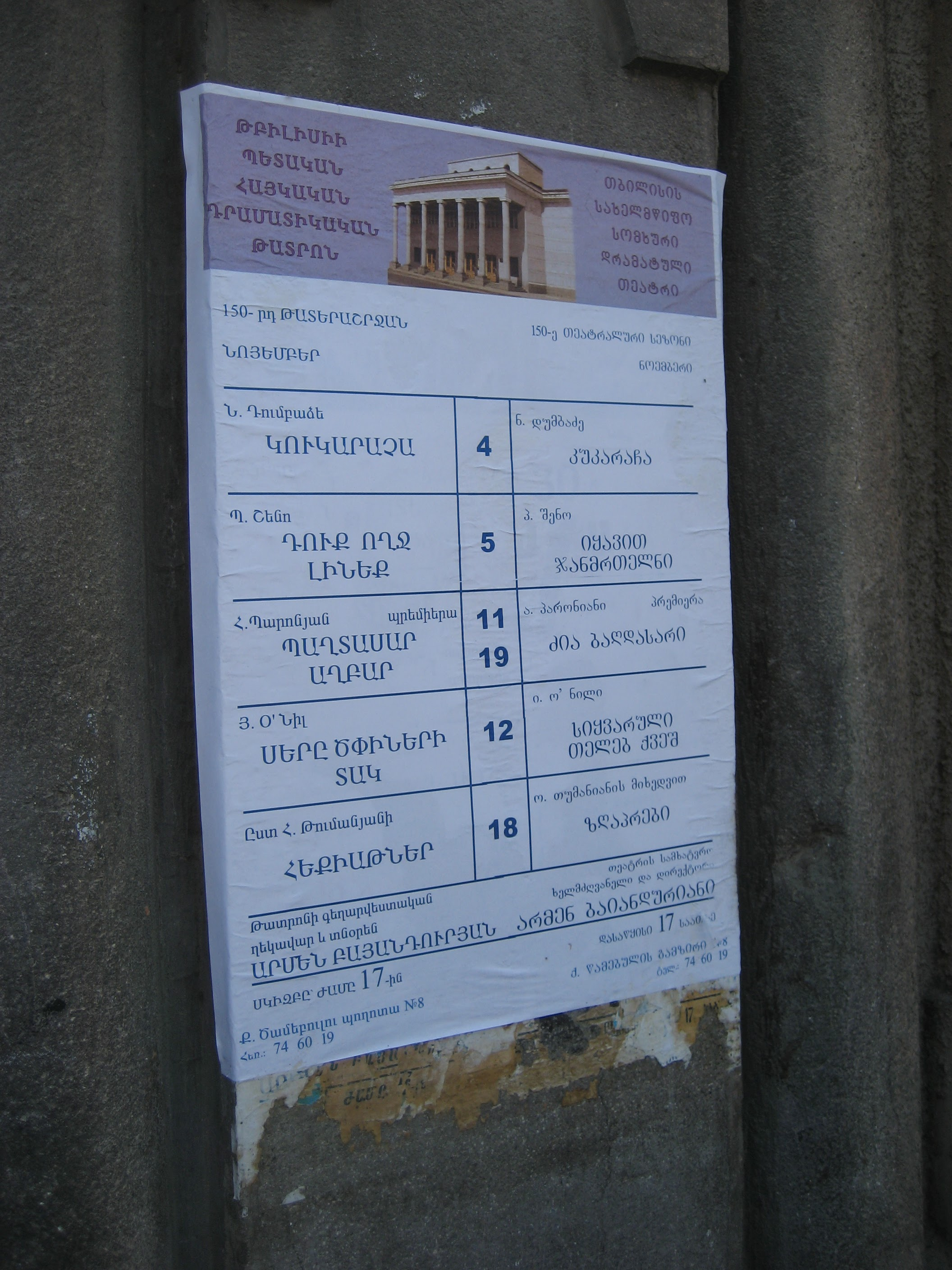
Calendar posted on street in 2006
