= Edgar Elbakyan =

Soviet actor

Edgar Elbakyan Էդգար Էլբակյան Эдгар Элбакян
- Born: 7 March 1928; Tiflis, Georgian SSR, Transcaucasian SFSR, Soviet Union
- Died: 31 August 1988 (aged 60); Yerevan, Armenian SSR, Soviet Union
- Citizenship: Armenian
- Education: Yerevan State Academy of Art
- Occupation: Actor
- Years active: 1950–1988
- Children: Armen Elbakyan
- Parent: Georgy Elbakyan

Edgar Elbakyan (Armenian: Էդգար Գևորգի Էլբակյան, 7 March 1928 – 31 August 1988) was an Armenian actor.

== Biography ==
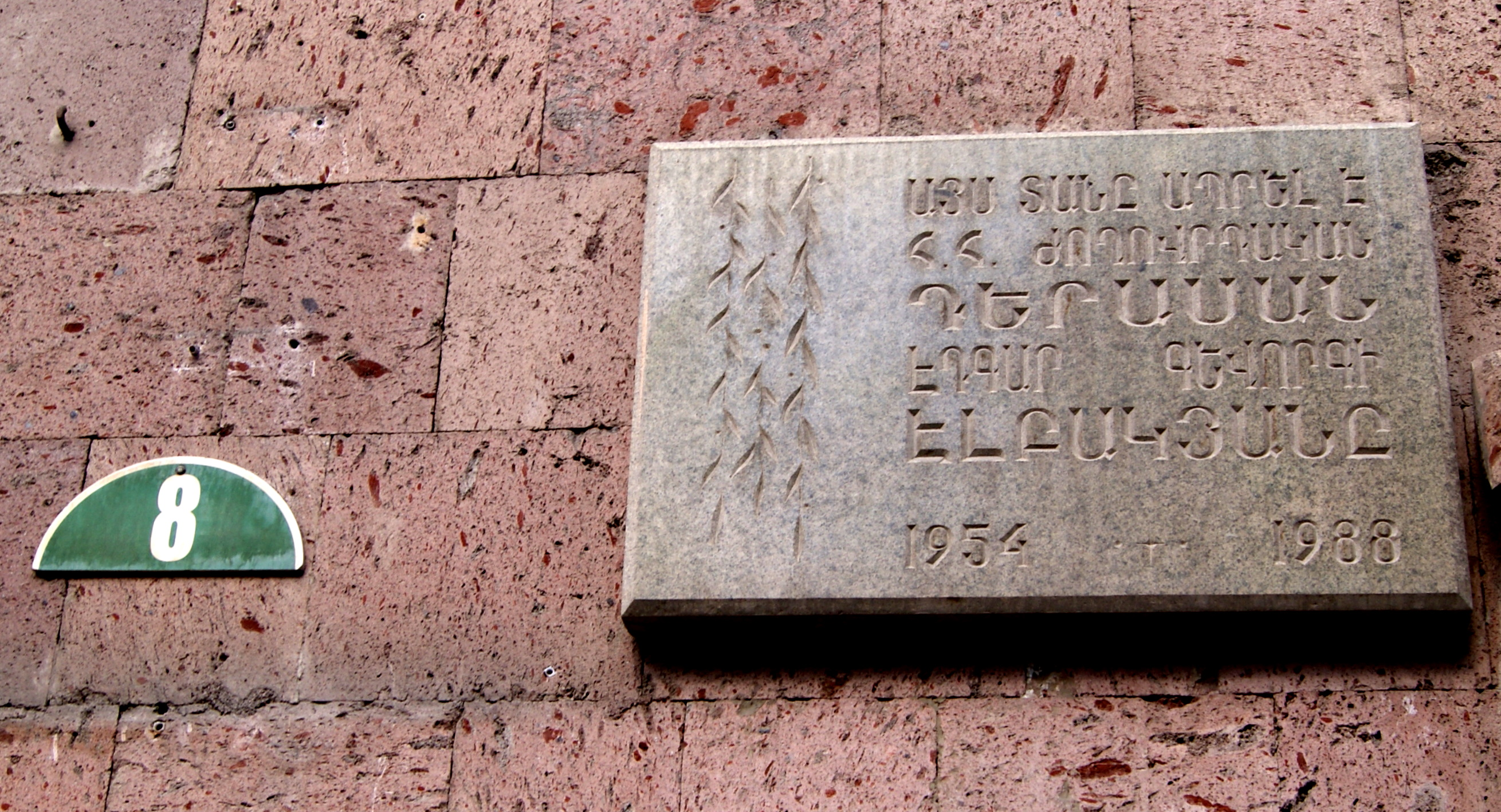
Edgar Elbakyan's plaque on Amiryan street, Yerevan

Elbakyan was born in Tiflis to a school-teacher family. In 1946, he graduated from secondary school, he moved to Yerevan and entered Yerevan State Academy of Art. He successfully graduated from the institute in 1950 and started his acting career in Yang Audience theater.

He acted the part of many outstanding images of Russian, Armenian, and foreign novels: Khlestakov in "The Government Inspector", and Cardinal Richelieu in "The Three Musketeers". In 1962, Edgar Elbakyan was invited to join the team of Sundukyan State Academic Theatre of Yerevan, and had successfully performed as : Giqo in "Pepo", Tarelkin in "Lawsuit", and Topaz in "Topaz".

His talent was in focus of wide theatre audience and critics, as well as art historians. In 1978, he was awarded the highest title in USSR Culture: "National Artist". In 1979, he was awarded The State Prize.

== Filmography ==
- 1954 – Small Change (Armenian: Manruq)
- 1963 – Fire (Krak) as Aramazd
- 1970 – At the Well (Jrhori mot) as Bagdasar
- 1972 – Txamardiq as Teller
- 1973 – Arshak as Arshak
- 1974 – Villagers (Hamagyaxaciner) as Mirzoyan
- 1975 – When it comes September (Erb galis e septembery) as Laertes
- 1976 – Baghdasar divorcing his wife (Bagdasary bajanvum e knojic)
- 1976 – Birth
- 1977 – Bow to bring the day (Khonarvir vaxva orvan)
- 1978 – Star of Hope - Phindz Artin
