= Gikor =

Gikor may refer to:

- "Gikor", a short story by Hovhannes Tumanyan
- Gikor (1934 film), an Armenian melodrama film
- Gikor (1982 film), an Armenian drama film
