= Sundukyan State Academic Theatre =

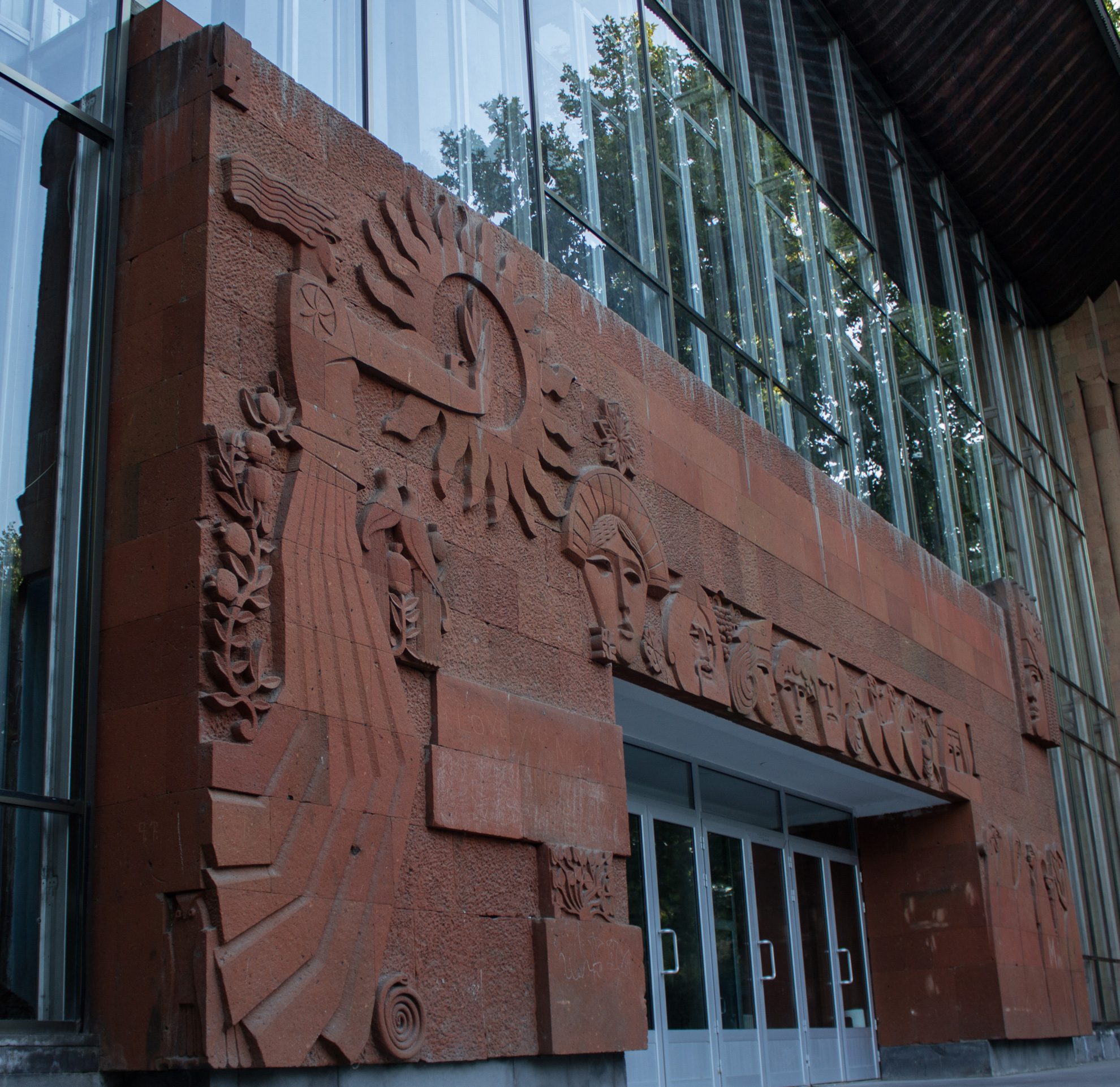
- The main entrance to the Sundukyan State Academic Theatre

- Location within Armenia

General information
- Type: Theatre
- Location: Yerevan, Armenia, Armenia
- Coordinates: 40°10′24.20″N 44°30′26.33″E
- Completed: February 25, 1922; 104 years ago

The Gabriel Sundukyan State Academic Theatre (Armenian: Գաբրիել Սունդուկյանի անվան ազգային ակադեմիական թատրոն), founded on February 25, 1922 in Yerevan, is the oldest modern theatre in Armenia.

Well-known actors and directors such as Vardan Ajemian, Valentin Podpomogov, Vahram Papazian, Hrachia Ghaplanyan, Hrachia Nersisyan, Hasmik, Avet Avetisian, Varduhi Varderesyan, Arus Voskanyan, and Edgar Elbakyan were the stars of the theater's group. They performed both national and foreign plays, such as Sundukyan's Testament, Muratsan's Rouzan, Shant's Ancient Gods, Camus's Caligula, Brecht's Resistible Rise of Arturo Ui, Chekhov's Cherry Orchard, O'Neill's Desire Under the Elms, Werfel's Forty Days of Musa Dagh, etc.

People's Artist of Armenia Armen Elbakyan is the Artistic Director of Sundukyan Theatre.

The theatre is named after Gabriel Sundukian, who founded the Armenian school of realistic drama.
