= Play Strindberg =

Play written by Friedrich Dürrenmatt

- Written by: Friedrich Dürrenmatt
- Original language: German

Premiere
- Date premiered: 8 February 1969
- Place premiered: Basel, Switzerland

Play Strindberg is a comedy play by the Swiss writer Friedrich Dürrenmatt, written in 1968 and published in 1969. It is a free adaptation of August Strindberg's The Dance of Death (1900), using Strindberg's characters. The title is a reference to Jacques Loussier's Play Bach series of recordings. The play premiered in Basel on 8 February 1969.

== See also ==
- Swiss literature
- 1969 in literature
