= Siranush =

- Սիրանոյշ
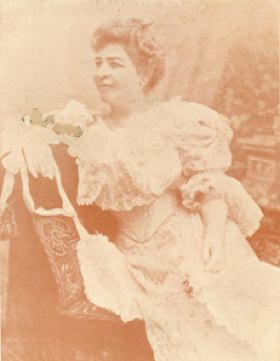
- Born: Merope Sahaki Kantarjian; May 25, 1857; Constantinople, Ottoman Empire
- Died: June 10, 1932 (aged 75); Cairo
- Resting place: Armenian Cemetery
- Other names: Siranuysh, Siranoush
- Occupation: Actress

Merope Sahaki Kantarjian (Armenian: Մերոպէ Սահակի Գանթարճեան), also known as Siranush, Siranuysh, or Siranoush (Armenian: Սիրանոյշ) (May 25, 1857, in Constantinople – June 10, 1932, in Cairo) was an Ottoman-born Armenian actress, one of the few whose work is tied to an entire era of theatrical history.

== Biography ==
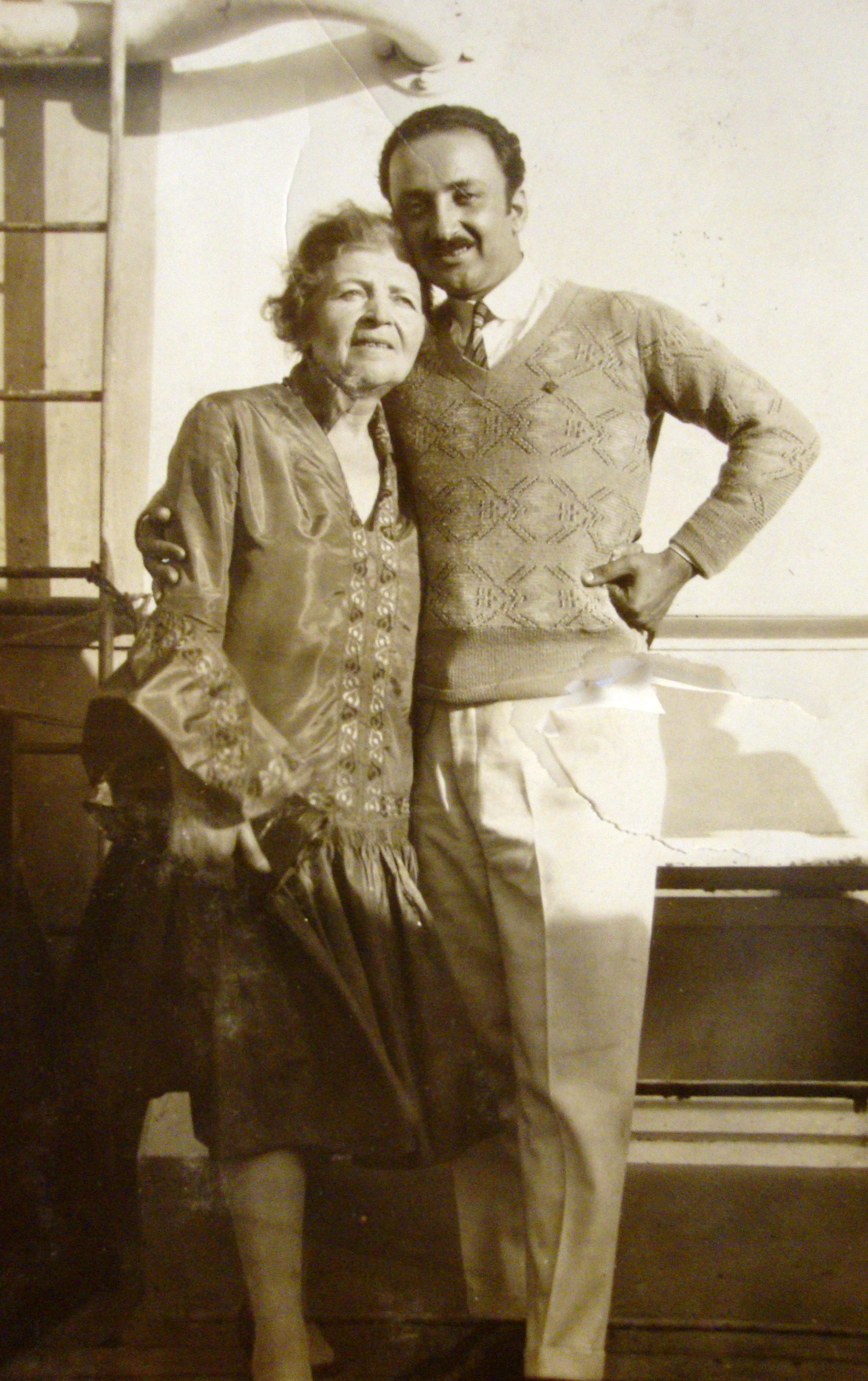
With her great-nephew, Professor Rouel Cazanjian, September 1926

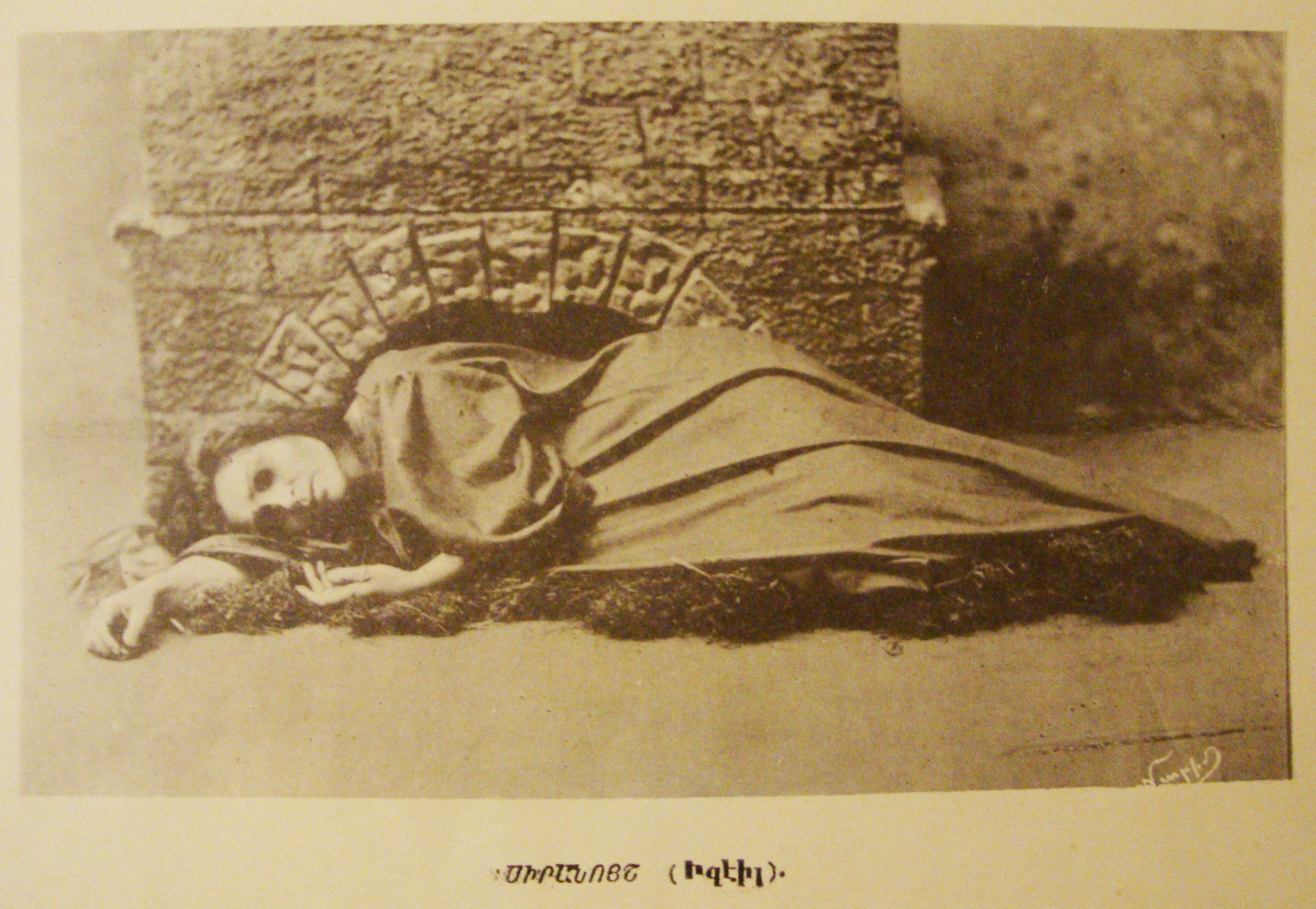
Siranush in the title role of the Armenian masterpiece "Anoush"

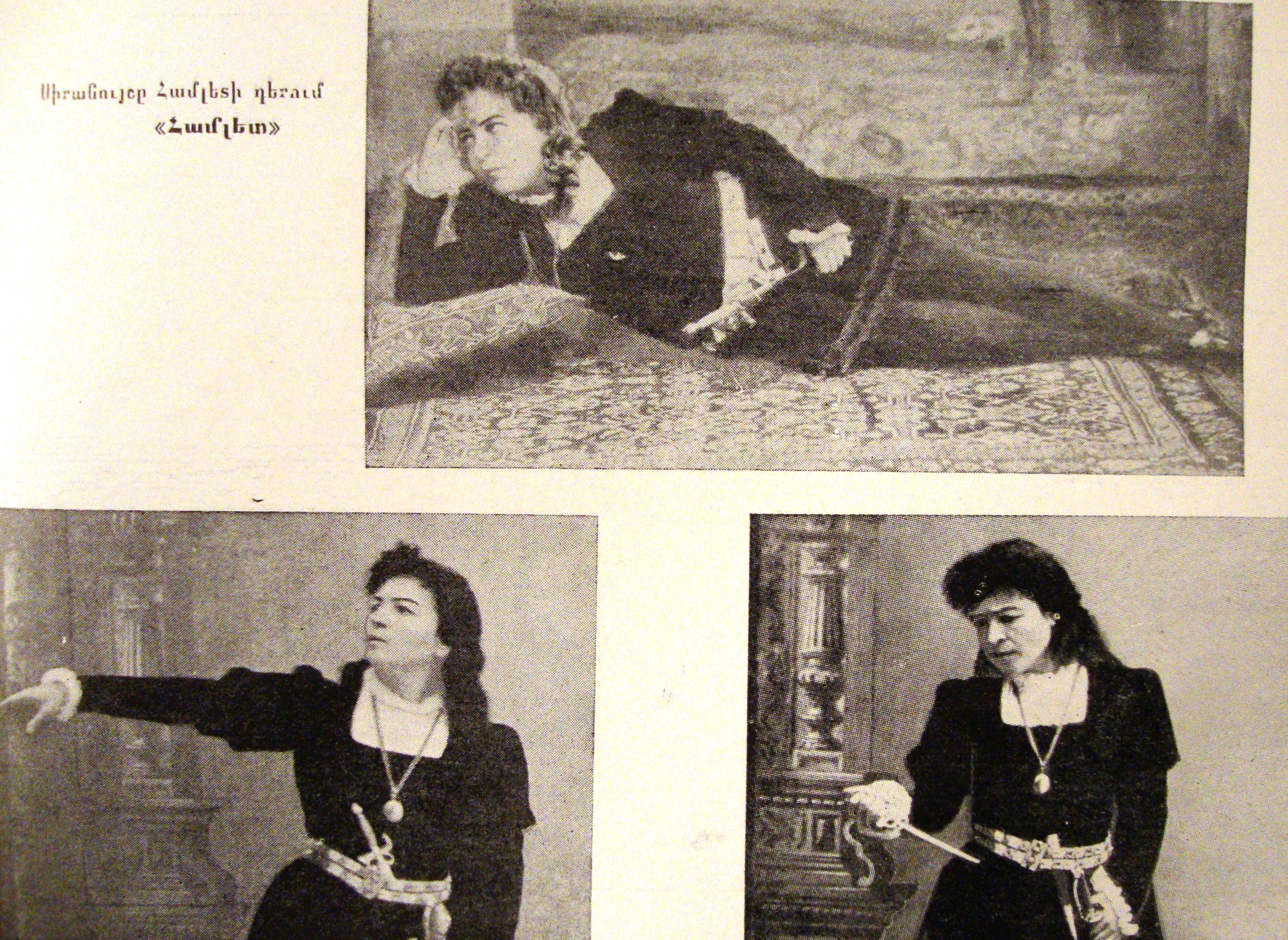
Siranush as Hamlet

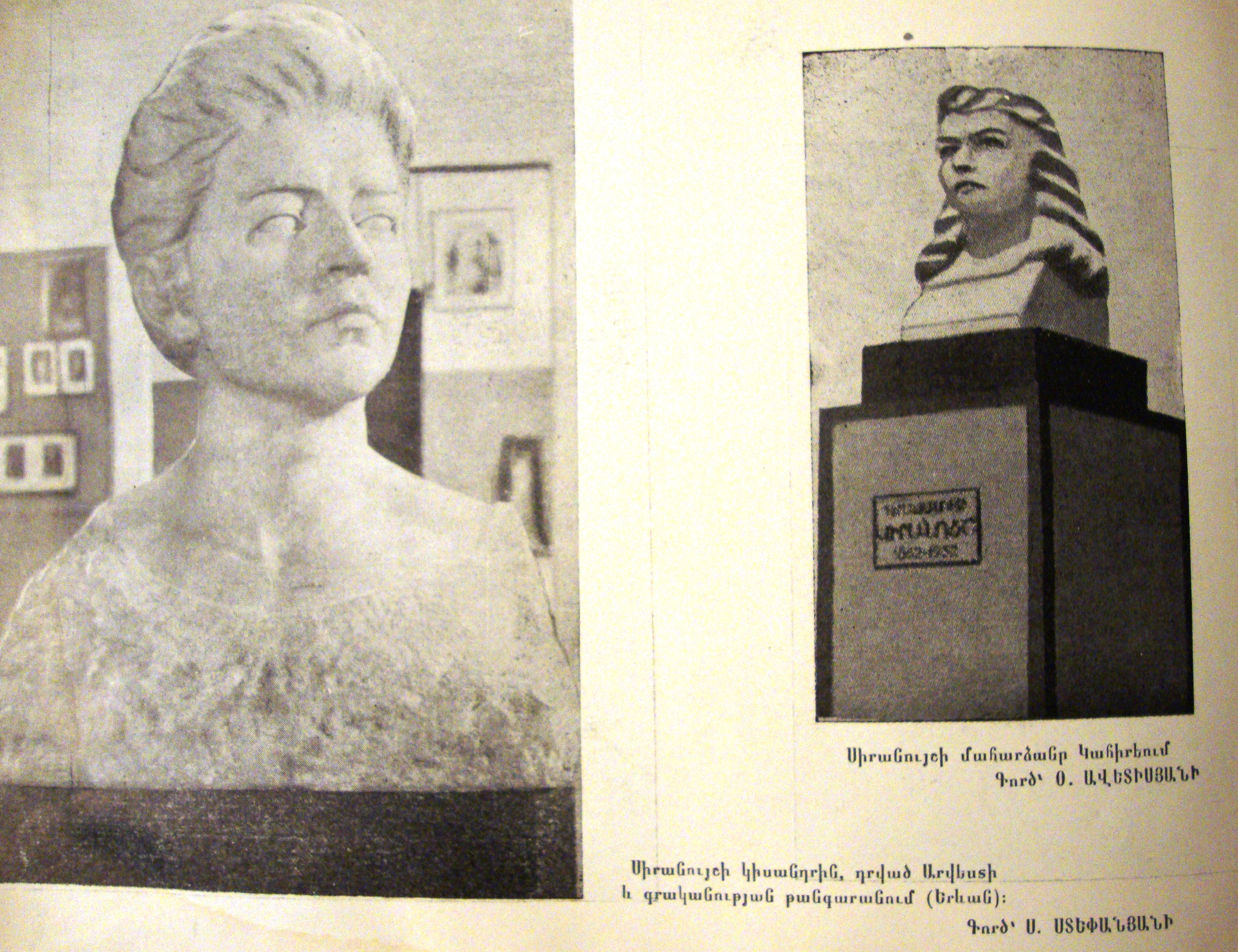
Many accolades were given to her as these busts of her image in Armenia

Merope Sahaki Kantarjian was born on May 25, 1857, in Constantinople, Ottoman Empire. Her sister, Astghik (Amber Kantarjian), was also a talented actress and singer.

She began to pursue her career in theater from the age of 16. Siranush started out as an actress and later an opera singer for the Armenian theater companies in her hometown.

Her artistic career started in 1873, working in the theatres of Constantinople and for Petros Maghakyan's "Oriental Theater". After the Turkish sultan issued a decree banning Armenian plays in the Ottoman Empire in 1878, Siranush was forced to move. In 1897 she moved to Transcaucasus and played in Tiflis, Yerevan, Baku and other towns with her group. She also visited Russia, Balkans and Egypt. Among her best roles were: Ophelia and Hamlet, Desdemona, Lady Macbeth (Shakespeare), Rouzan (Muratsan's "Rouzan") and others. After the death of Armenian actor Petros Adamian in 1891, Siranush sparked interest among Armenian spectators towards theater again.

Siranush played nearly 300 roles in the best plays of Armenian, Russian and European authors. Some of her best roles included Marguerite Gautier in "The Lady of the Camellias" by Dumas fils, Medea in "Medea", Zeynab in "Betrayal" by Alexander Yuzhin (Sumbatashvili), Ophelia in "Hamlet" by Shakespeare, Teresa in "Sister Teresa" by Luigi Camoletti, Johanna d’Arc in Schiller’s "Maid of Orleans", Kruchinina in "Guilty Without Guilt" by Ostrovski and others.

Siranush was the first female actress in the world who played the role of Hamlet and was gifted with the exceptional power of personification. She not only played the role, but “lived” and “relived” and was almost like Eleonora Duse, despite the fact that critics compared Siranush more with Sarah Bernhardt. This always angered Siranush and on one occasion she wrote the following:

“…Why does my small Armenian nation want to incorporate the persona of another actress in me for appreciation? Those who compare me with Sarah Bernhardt do not have the right to praise my hard work with that of another. Why was I supposed to be the Sarah Bernhardt of Armenians? After all, I showed all my sacrifice and feelings with love to my Armenian people as Mrs. Siranush.”

She died on June 10, 1932, in Cairo at the age of 75, and was buried in the Armenian Cemetery alongside the tomb of the famous Armenian satirist, Yervant Odian.
