= Vahram Papazian =

Soviet actor

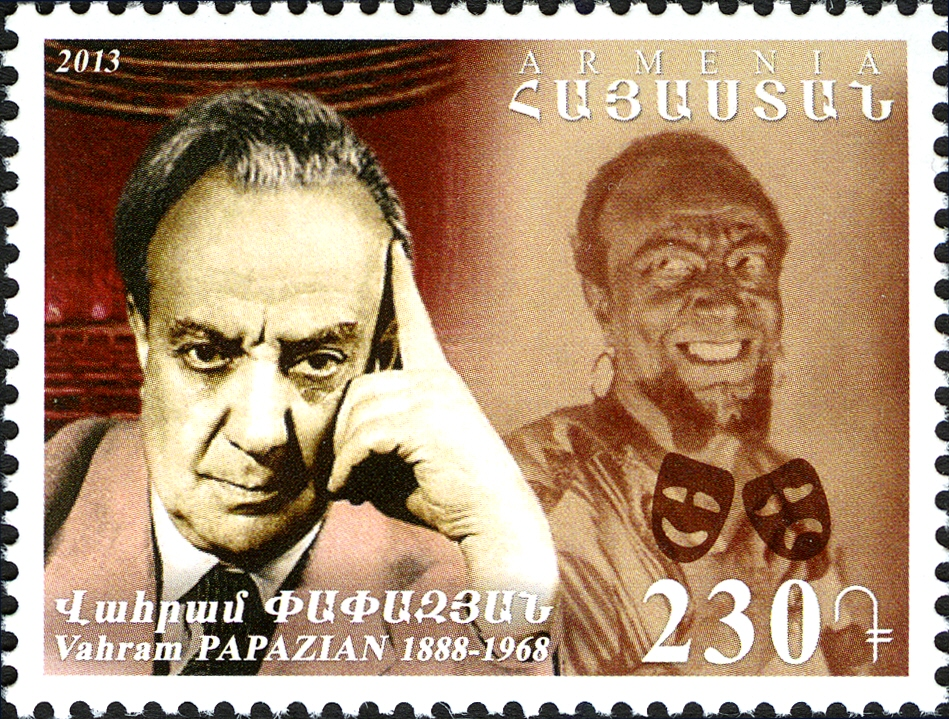
Vahram Papazyan on a 2013 Armenian stamp

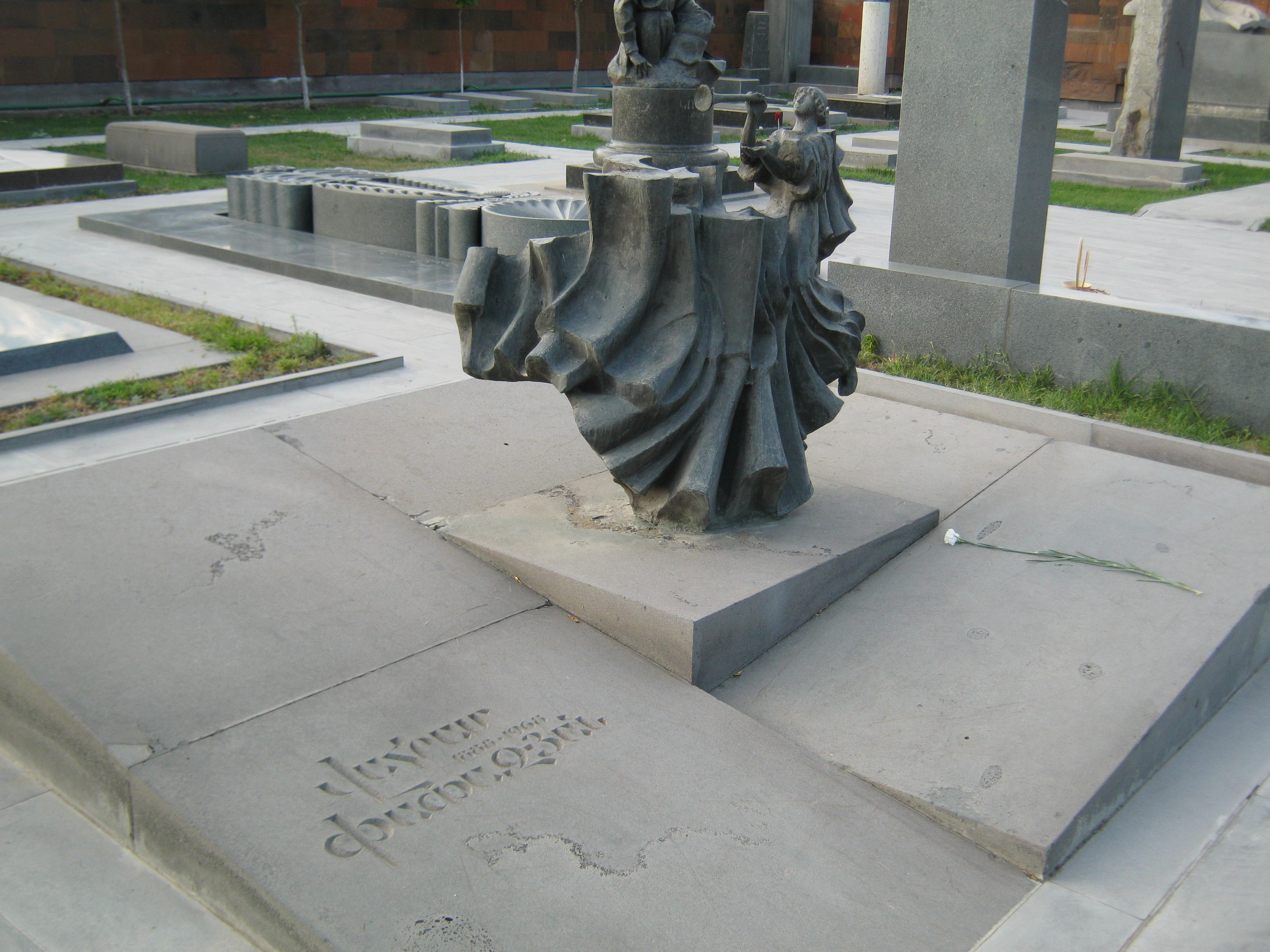
Grave of Vahram Papazyan, Pantheon cemetery in Yerevan

Vahram Papazian or Papazyan (Armenian: Վահրամ Քամերի Փափազյան; 6 January 1888 in Constantinople, Ottoman Empire – 5 June 1968 in Yerevan, Armenia), was a Soviet actor who was an ethnic Armenian, mostly known for his Shakespearean roles. Vahram did plays in Constantinople, Tiflis, Baku Armenian theaters, Moscow's Maly Theatre and in France, Italy, Austria, Spain, and Belgium. Papazian began his career in 1908, where he was regarded as one of the best Armenian actors at the time. Before his death he was known as the leading star in the Sundukyan Academic Theatre. The Council of National Literature's wrote that 'Vahram Papazian's Othello dominated the Armenian stage for more than half a century'.

In 1933, Reza Shah of Iran decided to create the National State Theatre Company and invited Vahram Papazian to cast a number of shows for the Iranian Red Cross.

== Legacy ==
Vahram Papazian is buried at Komitas Pantheon which is located in the city center of Yerevan.

A statue of Papazian was erected in Armenia on 5 February 2012.

=== Vahram Papazian Theatre Group ===
A Lebanese Armenian theatre group, founded by the Armenian General Benevolent Union's (AGBU, Armenian: ՀԲԸՄ) Armenian Youth Association (Armenian: ՀԵԸ), is named after Vahram Papazian.
