= Gabriel Sundukian =

Armenian writer and playwright

Gabriel Sundukian Գաբրիել Սունդուկյան
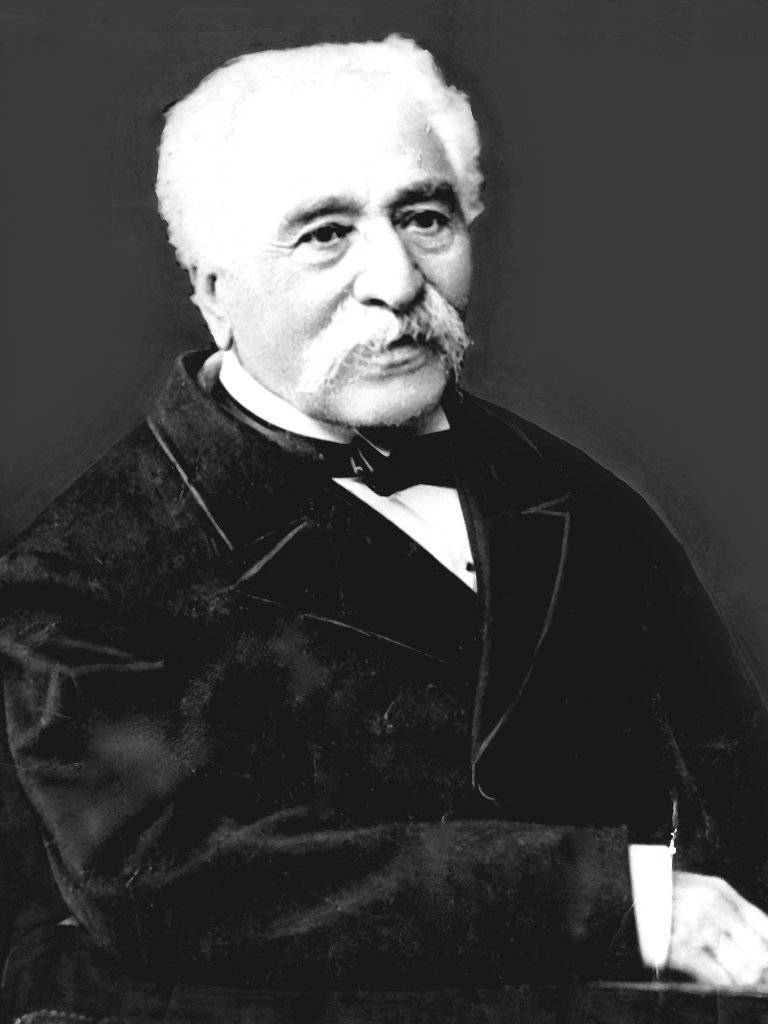
- Portrait on a 1950 Soviet postage stamp.
- Born: 11 July 1825; Tiflis, Georgian Governorate, Russian Empire
- Died: 29 March 1912 (aged 86); Tiflis, Tiflis Governorate, Russian Empire
- Education: Nersisyan School, Saint Petersburg State University
- Writing career
- Notable work: Pepo

Gabriel Sundukian (Armenian: Գաբրիել Սունդուկյան (reformed), Գաբրիէլ Սունդուկեան (classical); 11 July 1825 – 29 March 1912) was an Armenian writer and playwright, the founder of modern Armenian drama.

== Biography ==
Born in Tiflis, in a wealthy Armenian family, Sundukian learned both classical and modern Armenian, French, Italian and Russian, studied at the University of Saint-Petersburg, where he wrote a dissertation on the principles of Persian versification. Then he returned to Tiflis and entered the civil service. In 1854–58 he was banished to Derbend (Dagestan, Russia). Subsequently, he returned to Tiflis and stayed there until his death.

In 1863, the Armenian theatre company of Tiflis staged his first play, Sneezing at Night's Good Luck. His well-known play Pepo (1871) was made into the first Armenian talkie in 1935. Another famous film based on his work is Khatabala (1971). The Sundukian State Academic Theatre in Yerevan is named in his honor.

The Armenian church in Derbent was built in 1870 or 1871 using the project drawn by Sundukian in the 1850s. The church is currently a listed building.

== Plays ==
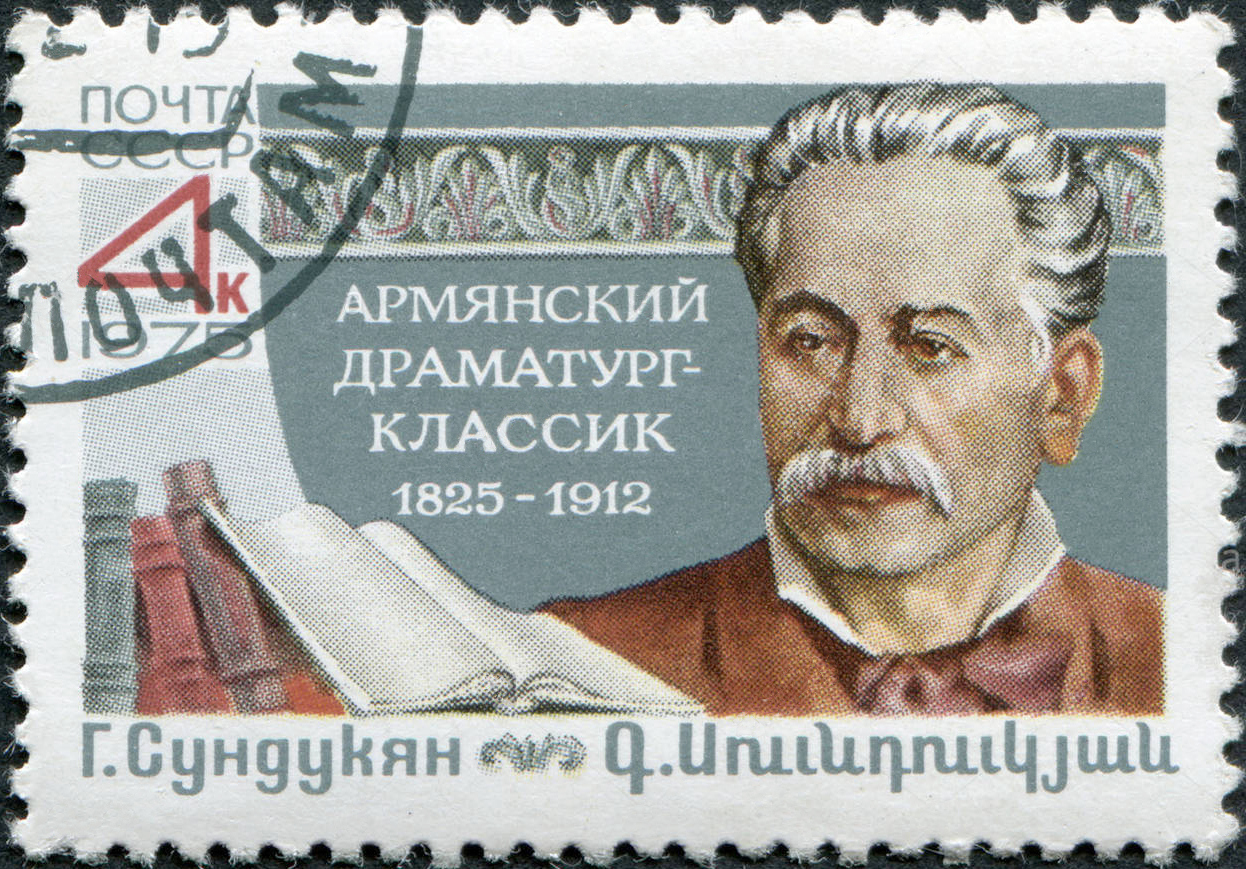
Sundukian on a 1975 Soviet stamp

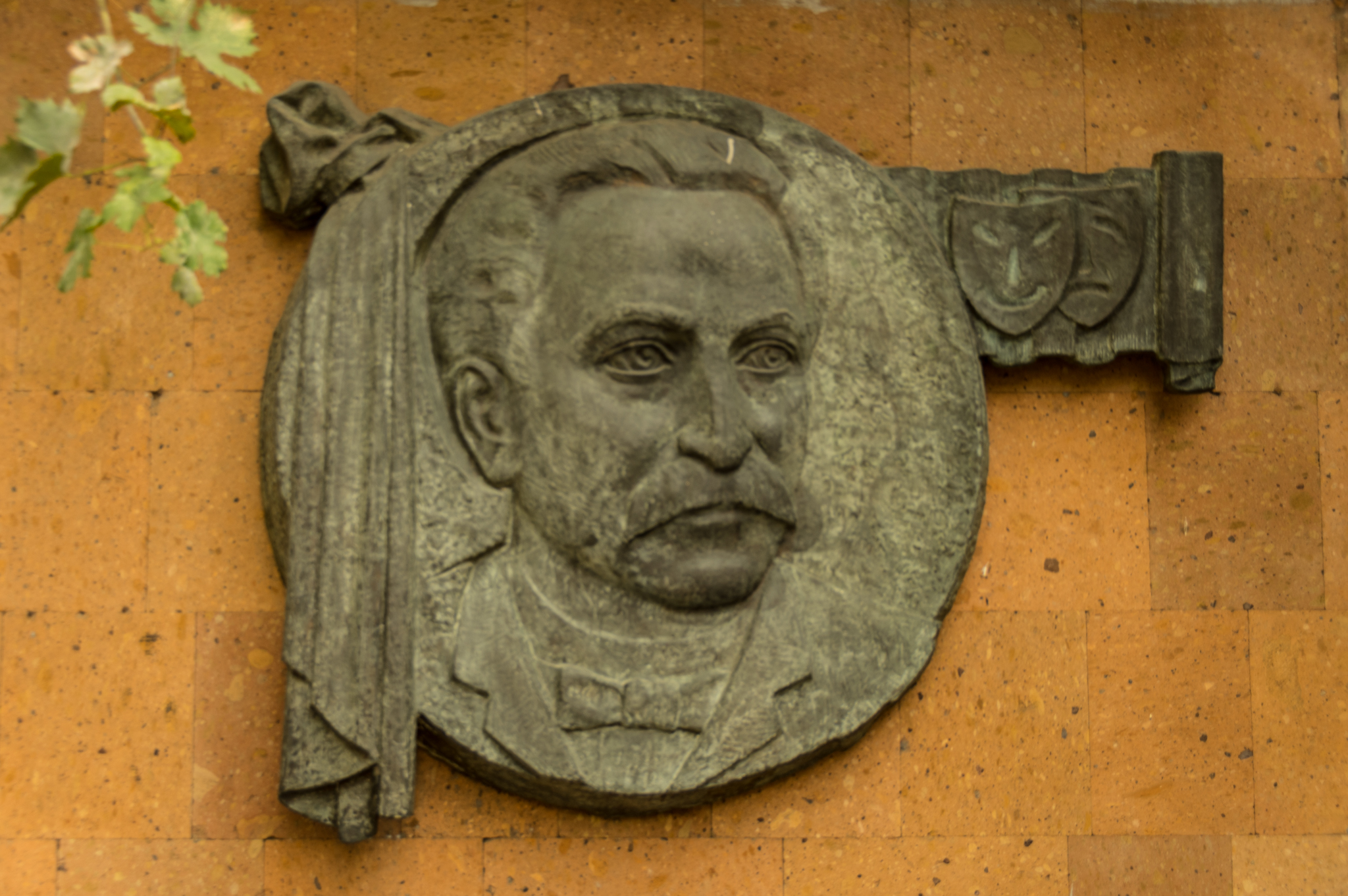
Sundukian Academic State Theatre

Ordered by date of composition (in some cases, several versions exist because of the author's revisions over the years).

- (1866) Gishervan sabre kher e (Գիշերուան սաբրը խէր է (A sneeze at night is good luck))
- (1866) Khatabala (Խաթաբալա (Quandary)). Published in 1881, 1904.
- (1866) Oskan Petroviche en kinkume (Օսկան Պետրովիչը էն կինքումը (Oskan Petrovich in the afterlife))
- (1869) Yev ayln kam nor Dioginis (Եւ այլն կամ նոր Դիոգինիս (Etcetera, or the new Diogenes))
- (1871) Pepo (Պէպօ); English translation: Bebo (1931, tr. E. Megerditchian)
- (1873) Kandvats ojakh (Քանդուած օջախ); English translation: The Ruined Family (1904, tr. F. B. Collins)
- (1884) Eli mek zoh (Էլի մէկ զոհ (Another victim))
- (1893) Amusinner (Ամուսիններ (Spouses)). Republished in 1896, 1897, and 1905.
- (1907) Baghnesi bokhcha (Բաղնըսի բոխչայ (Bath bag))
- (1910) Ser yev azatutyun (Սէր և ազատութիւն (Love and liberty))
