= Armenian liberation struggle (1722–1730) =

Rebellion against the Ottoman Empire

Armenian liberation struggle of 1722–1730
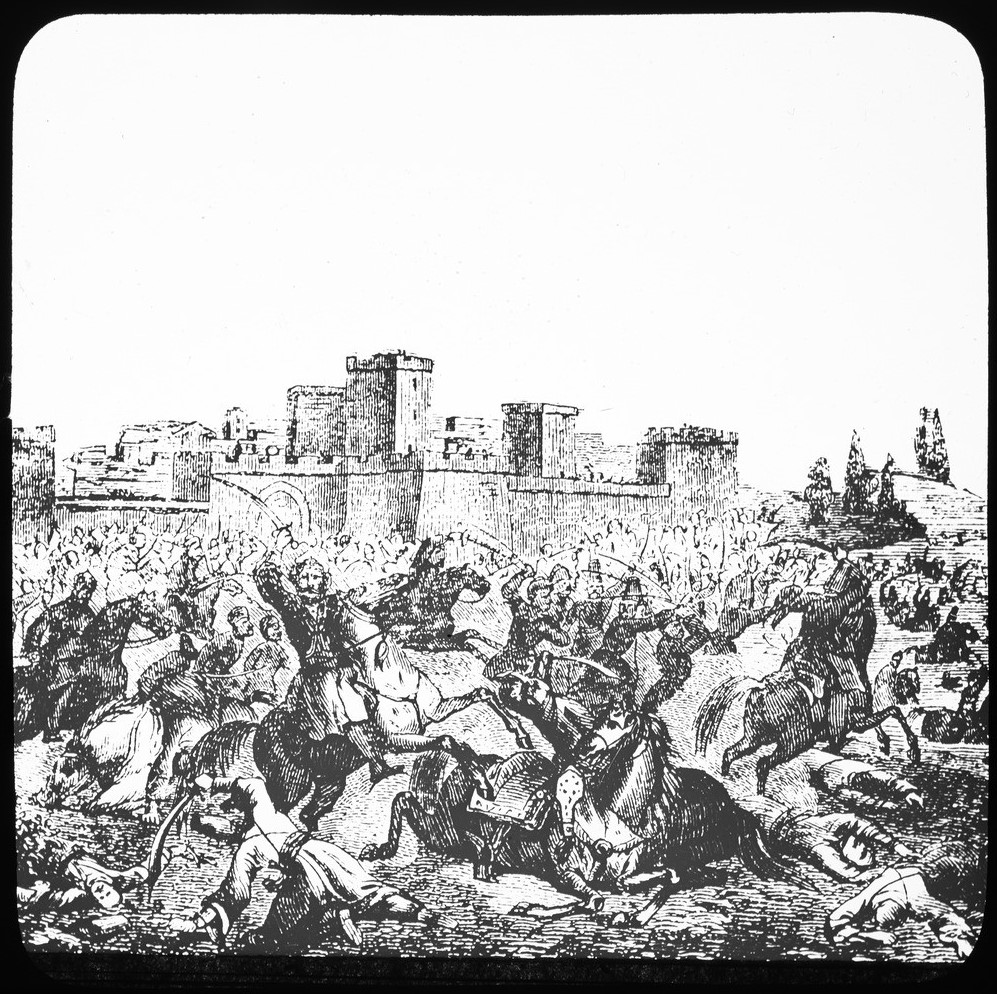
- War of the Armenians against the Turks during the Syunik Rebellion in 1722 (J. Broussali, 1887)
| Date | 1722–1730 |
| Location | Syunik and Artsakh |
| Result | Ottoman-Safavid victory: Some Armenian resistance continues until the region is reconquered by Iran |
| Territorial changes | Syunik is occupied by the Ottoman Empire in 1730 |

Belligerents
| Melikdoms of Syunik; Melikdoms of Karabakh: Principality of Khachen | Ottoman Empire; Khanates of the Caucasus; Karachorlu tribes Javanshir tribes Safavid Iran (until 1727) |

Commanders and leaders
| Davit Bek # Mkhitar Sparapet X Ter-Avetis (surrendered) | Ahmed III Tahmasp II |

Casualties and losses
| Unknown | 82,100 Ottoman soldiers |

The Armenian liberation struggle of 1722–1730 was a period of armed resistance by Armenians in the regions of Syunik and Artsakh (Mountainous Karabakh) in Iranian Armenia against Safavid rule and the Ottoman Empire. Beginning in 1722 in Syunik and 1724 in Artsakh, the movement sought to establish Armenian autonomy amid the collapse of the Safavid state and the threat of Ottoman occupation.

Under the leadership of Davit Bek in Syunik and a group of military commanders called yuzbashis in Artsakh—most notably Avan Yuzbashi—the Armenian lords (meliks) were united into a semi-independent principality and fortified mountain camps known as sghnakhs. From 1725, these forces resisted the Ottoman Empire's attempts to occupy the South Caucasus. While the Armenians won significant victories, such as the Battle of Halidzor (1727) in Syunik and the surprise defeat of an Ottoman detachment in Varanda (1725), the rebellion ultimately lost momentum after the death of Davit Bek in 1728 and his successor Mkhitar Sparapet in 1730. By 1731, the organized resistance had largely dispersed, though it paved the way for the later recognition of the Melikdoms of Karabakh by Nader Shah.

== Background ==
In the early eighteenth century, Armenia was divided between the Ottoman and Safavid empires. In the mountainous regions of Syunik (also known at the time as Ghapan) (Note: In the seventeenth and eighteenth centuries, the name Ghap’an (Ղափան, var. Խափան) was used to refer to two territories of different sizes: the smaller one was P’ok’r Ghap’an, and the larger one was Mets Ghap’an ('Great Ghapan'), which encompassed the majority of the districts of the historical province of Syunik.) and Mountainous Karabakh (also known as Artsakh by Armenians), remnants of the old Armenian nobility called meliks continued to exist as autonomous rulers of small principalities under Iranian suzerainty. In the late seventeenth century, Russian southward expansion under Peter the Great had raised hopes among these local Armenian leaders that an alliance could be made with Russia to free Armenia from Safavid and Ottoman rule. In 1701, Israel Ori, an Armenian noble from Syunik, went to Moscow and drew up a plan for a rebellion in Iranian Armenia with Russian help. Ori's plan was never realized, and he died in Astrakhan in 1711. However, Armenian secular and religious leaders continued to interact with the Russian state and began to see Russia as a natural ally for the Armenian people.

Meanwhile, the Safavid state was nearing its collapse in the 1720s. Shah Soltan Hoseyn's actions alienated his Georgian and Armenian subjects and provoked a rebellion among the empire's Sunni subjects in the Caucasus and Afghanistan in 1721. The weakening of central authority allowed Lezgin groups to raid the South Caucasus, prompting the Armenian meliks in both Syunik and Karabakh to strengthen their defenses and military forces.

In October 1722, the Afghans captured the Iranian capital of Isfahan after a six-month siege. Taking advantage of the chaotic situation, Peter the Great invaded Iran in 1722 with a 61,000-strong army. This revived hope among the Armenians and Georgians that Russian arms could help remove the region from Muslim rule. At Peter's request, a joint Armenian-Georgian army—comprising the Georgian army and the troops of the meliks of Karabakh led by Avan Yuzbashi and Catholicos Esayi Hasan-Jalalyan—assembled at Ganja to join with the Russian forces. However, fearing a conflict with the Ottomans and facing logistical problems, Peter remained in the Caspian littoral and did not move into the South Caucasus. With the Treaty of Saint Petersburg, signed on 12 September 1723, Russia annexed the southwestern coast of the Caspian Sea and made peace with Iran. In the meantime, the Ottomans prepared to invade the South Caucasus, assembling a large army in Erzurum by late 1722.

The weakening of the Safavid state allowed Muslim lords to increase their control over the Armenian population. Armenians in Syunik were also being taxed heavily to pay for Shah Tahmasp II's campaigns. Although the rebellions in Syunik and Karabakh (Artsakh) were part of the same movement, there were distinct regional differences. Karabakh was almost exclusively Armenian at the time and its resistance was organized around fortified mountain camps called sghnakhs. In contrast, Syunik had a significant Muslim population of Turkic and Kurdish nomads who grazed their herds in the mountains. Furthermore, the Syunik meliks were initially less organized and lacked a single leader.

Threatened by local Muslim forces, the meliks of Syunik sent Stepanos Shahumian to the court of the Georgian king Vakhtang VI in 1722 to request aid. Vakhtang agreed and dispatched Davit Bek, one of his most capable officers, along with 30 Armenian soldiers, to unify the resistance in Syunik. While Davit Bek consolidated power in the south, the Karabakh meliks independently fortified their positions, though the two regions would later coordinate their defense against the Ottoman advance.

== Rebellion in Syunik ==
=== Against Muslim tribes and the Safavids ===
Davit Bek made Shinuhayr his first base of operations and began repairing its fortress. A number of Syunik meliks and other local leaders came to declare their readiness to follow him. Among these were Melik Toros of Chavndur, the tanuters (mayors or village headmen) of Goghtn and Julfa, the yuzbashis (Note: A Turkic title literally meaning 'centurion' held by the subordinates of some meliks; the Armenian equivalent is haryurapet.) Pap and Pali, and Mkhitar Sparapet. A little later, he was joined by Melik Parsadan of Halidzor and Ter Avetis. Davit Bek assembled a force of 2000 warriors and turned them into a disciplined army. Father Hovakim of Tatev Monastery declared the full support of the Armenian clergy for Davit Bek. With the support of the local peasants and the meliks, he managed to defend the Armenian-inhabited areas from the Muslim tribes. Davit Bek's first military actions were directed against the Turkic and Kurdish tribes. He first defeated the Karachorlu and Javanshir groups. On a plateau called Uchtapa, he reportedly defeated thousands of Javanshir tribesman with a force of 400. His victories brought more and more Armenians to his ranks.

Davit Bek also fought against those Armenian meliks who opposed the rebellion. Among these were Melik Baghir of Tatev, who converted to Islam, and Frangul of Yeritsvank and others. Davit killed Baghir after a two-day battle and distributed his property. After this victory, Davit Bek made Tatev his new center. Davit instituted strict discipline among his troops, harshly punishing disobedience and misconduct. For panic-mongering and cowardice, he put his friend Pap to death, and had his lieutenants Ter Avetis and Mkhitar Sparapet briefly imprisoned.

Having established order and a strong military force in Syunik, Davit Bek began campaigning against the local khans (formally Safavid governors, but largely independent with the collapse of central authority) and other Muslim lords of varying sizes, who joined forces against Davit Bek. Tahmasp II, the Safavid king based in Qazvin, sent some troops against Davit. Davit Bek's first great victory came at the battle of Chavndur, where the Armenian rebels defeated the combined forces of the khanates of Bargushat and Karadagh. Another notable victory was the conquest of the powerful fortress of Zeyva by Mkhitar Sparapet and Ter Avetis. On 29 March 1724, Davit Bek besieged the strategically important fortress of Vorotnaberd and captured it after four days of fierce fighting. In May 1724, a force of 2,000 Armenian fighters from Karabakh commanded by Avan Yuzbashi and Ivan Karapet (an Armenian representative of Peter the Great) joined Davit Bek's forces. The last battles between the Armenian rebels and the Persians took place in 1725 at Goghtn and Meghri. Thousands of Persians were killed and fled southward across the Aras River.

=== Davit Bek's principality ===
As a result of Davit Bek's campaigns from 1722 to 1725, all of Syunik and some neighboring areas were brought under Armenian control. Davit Bek thus became the ruler of an independent Armenian principality, where all the meliks submitted to his authority. The borders of this principality largely corresponded to the borders of the modern-day Syunik Province of the Republic of Armenia, extending from the district of Sisian in the north to the Aras River in the south, and from the Zangezur Mountains in the west to a line of fortified points and settlements in the east. Its probable easternmost fortified point was Kulaberd, in the modern-day Lachin District of Azerbaijan. A hostile Muslim principality separated Davit Bek's realm from the Armenian melikdoms of Mountainous Karabakh.

Davit Bek appointed both his fellow Georgian Armenians and locals as commanders. Mkhitar was appointed commander of the armies, or sparapet. A military council and staff was created. The units of Davit Bek's army had their own flags. Apparently following the example of the meliks of Karabakh, Davit Bek created a series of fortified military districts in Syunik called sghnakhs. In early 1723, the fortress of Halidzor became the new center of the principality. Davit Bek expanded the fortifications and gathered supplies there.

=== Against the Ottomans ===
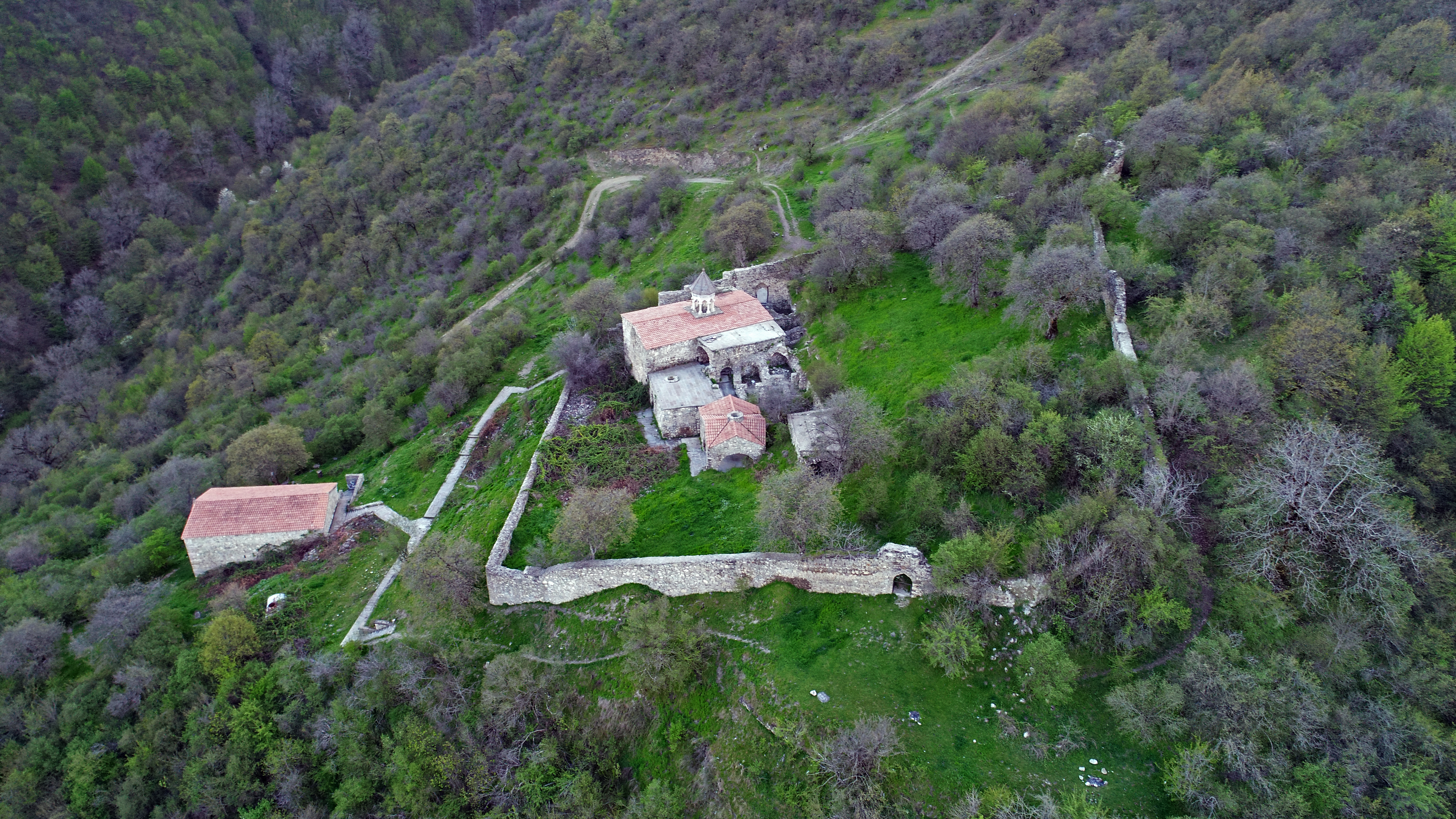
Halidzor Fortress, as seen from above

In 1724, the Ottomans invaded Iran and Eastern Armenia, capturing Tiflis, Yerevan and Hamadan. The first Ottoman attempt to enter Syunik was in the spring of 1725. Although this first attempt failed, in 1726 the Ottomans occupied the trade route running along the south of Syunik, taking Ordubad, Agulis and Meghri and pushing into the interior of Syunik. They were supported by the local Turkic tribes and the Iranian khans. The Armenians suffered heavy losses trying to stop the Ottoman advance. Disunity and demoralization emerged within the Armenian ranks. It was in this context that Mkhitar and other leaders sent an appeal for assistance to Russia on 24 March 1726. (Note: For an English translation of the text of the appeal, see. Some scholars believe that the absence of Davit Bek's signature on this letter indicates that he had already died by this time and been succeeded by Mkhitar, whereas the main primary source on the rebellion, Patmut’iwn Ghapants’wots’, states that Davit Bek fell ill and died at Halidzor in 1728.) However, Russia had already signed the Treaty of Constantinople with the Ottoman Empire in 1724, recognizing the latter's rights over the Iranian territories of the South Caucasus away from the Caspian coast. The Armenian rebels were unaware of these developments and continued to hope for a Russian intervention.

In February 1727, the Ottomans initiated a massive assault, and the Armenian forces retreated to the fortress of Halidzor. Joined by the khans of Bargushat and Karadagh, the Karachorlu and other local Turkic and Kurdish forces, the Ottomans besieged Halidzor on 26 February 1726. Although the initial assaults were unsuccessful, with the defenders taking minor losses, a major attack with siege machines and ladders demonstrated to the defenders that they could not hold out indefinitely. Then, Davit Bek proposed a plan to sortie out of the fortress and strike the besieging forces. The sortie was led by Ter Avetis and Mkhitar. The Ottomans were caught off guard and began a disorderly flight, taking heavy casualties as the Armenians chase them away. Davit Bek's forces begin driving the Ottomans out of Syunik. This spectacular victory breathed new life into the rebellion, and many meliks that had abandoned the movement joined Davit Bek once again. The Armenian forces won another great victory over the Ottomans at Meghri, capturing Meghri Fortress with the help of locals and inflicting heavy losses on an Ottoman army, which was forced to flee across the Aras. Along with war booty, the rebels captured thousands of tax documents, which they destroyed. Davit Bek then campaigned against the Ottomans at Bekh, Ordubad and Agulis. As a result of Davit Bek's victories, Syunik was again under Armenian control.

== Rebellion in Mountainous Karabakh ==
In 1723, the Ottoman army captured Tiflis, the capital of the Kingdom of Kartli, as well as Ganja. After more than three months of resistance, in which the Ottoman troops lost 20,000 soldiers, Yerevan, with its population of 5,000, capitulated. Following this the leaders of Ganja joined the side of the Ottomans. As there was no help from Iran either, the Armenian forces of Karabakh and Syunik were left alone against the Ottoman forces, which entered Karabakh first.

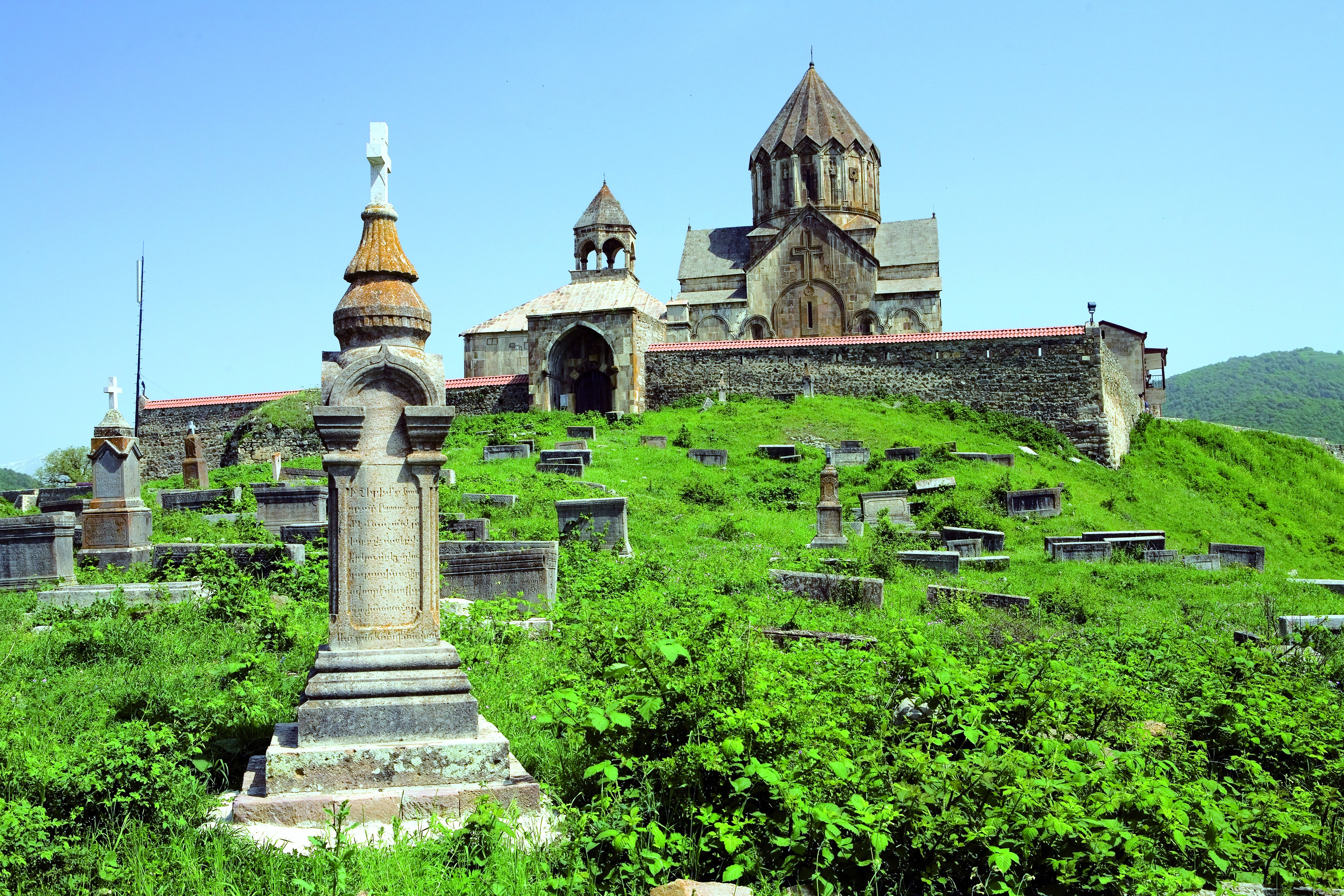
Gandzasar monastery, the seat of the Catholicos of Aghvank Esayi Hasan-Jalalyan

In 1724, the Ottoman commanders got the Catholicos of Etchmiadzin Astvatsatur I to write a letter addressing the Armenians of Karabakh and the Catholicos of Gandzasar Esayi Hasan-Jalalyan, asking him to lay down their arms and accept Ottoman rule. Despite the letter, Hasan-Jalalyan and his associates refused to surrender and prepared to fight the Ottoman army. In 1724, the Armenian liberation forces joined forces with the Muslim leaders of Ganja and signed an agreement to fight together against the Ottoman troops. The Armenian military leaders also offered cooperation to Iran in its fight against the Ottoman troops. Karapet Shirvanov (Ivan Karapet) arrived in Karabakh from Russia with promises to support the liberation struggle, providing further backing to the Armenian leadership.

=== Ottoman invasion of Varanda ===
In March 1725, three detachments of the Ottoman army invaded the province of Varanda, thus creating a threat to the Small Signakh. The Armenian population placed about 6,000 Ottoman soldiers in the villages, and the self-defence forces managed to destroy them with a surprise attack at night. Two Ottoman pashas were killed and a third was taken prisoner. This victory increased the morale and combat capability of the Armenian units. The Armenians had already sent a delegation to the Russian army and were rejected, but now they decided to send another delegation to Tabriz, to Tahmasp, the heir to the throne of Iran. In the same year, the Armenian delegation, headed by priests Anton and Kyokhva Chalabi, returned to Karabakh from Russia, conveying a negative response from the Russian side. The Armenians wrote another letter to Peter the Great, not knowing that the emperor had already died.

=== Battle of Shushi (1726) ===
The second Ottoman invasion was also unsuccessful. In 1726 a 40,000 Ottoman army was unable to take the Shushi fortress and returned to Ganja. After this battle, the Armenians, for the third time, sent a delegation led by Kyokhva Chalabi to the Russian Empress Catherine I.

== Aftermath ==
Although initially Davit's main enemy was the Iranians, he quickly came to the conclusion that it was the Ottomans who posed a much greater danger. Davit Bek's victories had left a strong impression on Shah Tahmasp, who in 1727 sent a letter to Davit recognizing him as ruler of Ghapan and appointing him as governor and commander of Safavid forces in the region. Davit Bek suddenly fell ill in mid-1728 and died at Halidzor. He was succeeded by his lieutenant Mkhitar Sparapet. Mkhitar continued the struggle against the Ottomans. Although Mkhitar won some victories, a new Ottoman campaign began and Halidzor was again besieged at the beginning of 1729. Ter Avetis and others following him, believing that victory was impossible to achieve, called for negotiations with the Ottomans. Mkhitar, unable to convince his followers to continue fighting, left the fortress under cover of night. Ter Avetis then surrendered Halidzor to the Ottomans in exchange for guarantees, but the Ottoman pasha ordered the men killed and the women and children taken prisoner. The fortress of Halidzor was destroyed.

After this defeat, Mkhitar continued resisting the Ottoman occupation, sometimes succeeding in liberating some settlements. He defeated the Ottomans at Ordubad in 1730. That same year, Mkhitar went to Khndzoresk to rest. A group of locals, fearing that their village would be destroyed like Halidzor because of Mkhitar's presence, murdered the rebel leader. Mkhitar's head was sent to the Ottoman pasha of Tabriz, who ordered the execution of the murderers. The Armenian forces of Syunik dispersed after the death of their leader. Some decided to move to Russian-controlled territories, while others continued to resist the Ottoman occupation from the mountains of Syunik until the 1730s, when Nader Khan (later Nader Shah) recaptured the Caucasian territories from the Ottomans.

The Ottoman army started gaining the advantage over the Armenian forces of Artsakh after the death of Davit Bek and Esayi Hasan-Jalalyan. In 1728, Ottoman armies were able to occupy the Azerbaijan province of Iran. The Catholicos of Gandzasar, having learned about the signing of the Russian-Ottoman treaty of 1724, became inclined to the idea of negotiating with the Ottoman side. The liberation forces, disappointed in Russian promises, were inclined to do the same.

At the beginning of 1729, the second part of the Armenian liberation forces sent a new delegation led by Avan and Tarhan to the Russian military leadership, but, having received a negative response, they did not return. In the years 1729-1731, the struggle against the Ottoman conquest was continued by the signakh of Gulistan, whose commander was Avraham Sparapet. The liberation struggle of the meliks of Kharabakh came to an end. At the same time, there was a split in Syunik. Disagreements between Mkhitar Sparapet and Ter-Avetis led to the capture of the Halidzor Fortress.

The commander Tahmasb Qoli Khan, who managed to suppress the Afghan uprising and repel the Ottoman invasion, restored the borders of Iran in a few years and in 1735 signed a new peace with the Ottoman Empire and Russia. He became the new ruler of Iran, known as Nadir Shah. He was supported by the Armenians in his fight against the Ottoman troops. In gratitude, the Shah visited Etchmiadzin, attended the liturgy and allocated 1000 tomans for the restoration of the throne of the Supreme Patriarch, decorating the temple with a golden chandelier weighing 15 kg. Prominent figures of Eastern Armenia, such as Melik Egan of Dizak, Melik Shahnazar of Gegharkunik, Melik Hakobjan of Erivan and others, were part of Nadir Shah's army.

After accession to the throne, Nadir Shah removed the melikdoms of Karabakh from subordination to the Ganja beylerbek and transferred them directly into the authority of his brother, Ibrahim Khan, the sipah of Iranian Azerbaijan, and in matters of importance, the meliks were instructed to apply directly to Nadir Shah himself. After the death of Nadir Shah, the Armenian-populated melikdoms were brought into vassalage by the newly formed Karabakh Khanate.

== Bibliography ==
- Zhamkochyan, H.; et al. (1975). Հայ ժողովրդի պատմություն, սկզբից մինչև 18-րդ դարի վերջը [History of the Armenian people from the beginning to the end of the 18th century]. Yerevan: Yerevan State University.
- Parsamyan, V. A. (1963). History of the Armenian people. II (IX-XIX centuries). Yerevan: Haypetusmank.
- Maghalyan, A. (2007). Արցախի մելիքությունները և մելիքական տները XVII-XIX դդ. [Melikdoms of Artsakh and melik houses of the 17th-19th centuries]. Yerevan: National Academy of Sciences of the Republic of Armenia "Gitutyun". ISBN 9785808007147.
- Telunts, Malik (2017). Освободительная борьба Сюника и Арцаха в 1722–1730 гг. и Россия. Территория и органы самоуправление армянских областей Арцаха и Сюника [The Liberation Movement of 1722 to 1730 in Syunik and Artsakh and Russia. The Territories and Local Authorities of Artsakh and Syunik] (PDF). Գիտական ընթերցումներ (հոդվածների ժողովածու) [Scientific Readings (collection of articles)] (in Russian). Vol. 1. Stepanakert: Artsakh State University Publishing House. pp. 153–156.
- Aivazian, A. (2001). "The Secret Meeting of Armenians on Lim Island in 1722: Concerning the Possible Involvement of Western Armenians in an All-Armenian Liberation Movement". Iran & the Caucasus. 5 (Iran & the Caucasus ed.). Brill: 85–92. doi:10.1163/157338401X00099. JSTOR 4030848.
- Bournoutian, George A. (2001). Armenians and Russia, 1626-1796: A Documentary Record. Costa Mesa, California: Mazda Publishers. ISBN 9781568591322.
- Bournoutian, George A. (1997). "Eastern Armenia from the Seventeenth Century to the Russian Annexation". In Hovannisian, Richard (ed.). The Armenian People From Ancient to Modern Times, Volume II: Foreign Dominion to Statehood: The Fifteenth Century to the Twentieth Century. New York: Palgrave Macmillan. ISBN 1-4039-6422-X.
- Hewsen, Robert H. (1973–1974). "The Meliks of Eastern Armenia II". Revue des Études Arméniennes. Nouvelle série. X: 281–303.
- Hewsen, Robert (2001). Armenia: A Historical Atlas. Chicago University Press. ISBN 0-226-33228-4.
- Avery, Peter (1991). "Nādir Shāh and the Afsharid Legacy". The Cambridge History of Iran. Vol. 7. Cambridge University Press. pp. 1–62. doi:10.1017/CHOL9780521200950.002. ISBN 978-1-139-05499-7.
- Hovhannisyan, P. H. (2012). "Hay azatagrakan sharzhumnerě XVIII darum" Հայ ազատագրական շարժումները XVIII դարում [The Armenian liberation movements in the 18th century]. In Simonyan, Hr. R. (ed.). Hayotsʻ patmutʻyun: Hnaguyn zhamanakneritsʻ minchʻev mer orerě Հայոց պատմություն։ Հնագույն ժամանակներից մինչև մեր օրերը [History of Armenia: From ancient times until our days] (PDF) (in Armenian). Yerevan State University Publishing House. pp. 204–245. ISBN 978-5-8084-1639-0.
- Adalian, Rouben Paul (2010). Historical Dictionary of Armenia (2 ed.). Scarecrow Press. ISBN 978-0810874503.
- Aivazian, Armen (2022). Arevelahayutʻyan zhoghovrdagrutʻyuně XVII-XVIII darerum ev hayotsʻ zorkʻi tʻvakazmě 1720-akan tʻvakannerin Արևելահայության ժողովրդագրությունը XVII-XVIII դարերում և հայոց զորքի թվակազմը 1720-ական թվականներին [Demography of the Eastern Armenians in the XVII–XVIII Centuries and the Strength of the Armenian Army in the 1720s] (in Armenian). Yerevan: NT Holding. ISBN 978-9939-870-59-5.
- Aivazian, Armen (2006). "1720-akan tʻvakanneri Syunyatsʻ ishkhanapetutʻyan teghagrutʻyan masin" 1720-ական թվականների Սյունյաց իշխանապետության տեղագրության մասին [About the topography of the Syunik principality of the 1720s]. Etchmiadzin (in Armenian) (5): 60–72 – via Pan-Armenian Digital Library.
- Hakobyan, T. Kh.; Melik-Bakhshyan, S. T.; Barseghyan, H. Kh. (1991). "Ghapʻan Mets" Ղափան Մեծ. Hayastani ev harakitsʻ shrjanneri teghanunneri baṛaran Հայաստանի և հարակից շրջանների տեղանունների բառարան [Dictionary of toponymy of Armenia and adjacent territories] (in Armenian). Vol. 3. Yerevan University Publishing House. p. 553.
- Hovhannisian, A. G.; Papazian, H. D. (1972). "Hay azatagrakan sharzhumě iranakan tirapetutʻyan ev tʻurkʻ zavtʻichʻneri dem XVIII dari aṛajin kesin" Հայ ազատագրական շարժումը իրանական տիրապետության և թուրք զավթիչների դեմ XVIII դարի առաջին կեսին [The Armenian liberation movement against Iranian rule and the Turkish invaders in the first half of the 18th century]. In Khachikian, L. S.; et al. (eds.). Hay zhoghovrdi patmutʻyun Հայ ժողովրդի պատմություն [History of the Armenian People] (in Armenian). Vol. IV. Yerevan: Armenian SSR Academy of Sciences Publishing House. pp. 131–189.
- Nalbandian, Louise (2018). The Armenian Revolutionary Movement: The Development of Armenian Political Parties Through the Nineteenth Century. Berkeley: University of California Press. p. 116. ISBN 978-0-520-30385-0.
