= David Bek (disambiguation) =

Davit Bek (or David Bek) was an Armenian nobleman and revolutionary.

David Bek may also refer to:

- David Bek (novel), a novel by Armenian writer Raffi
- David Bek (opera), an opera composed by Armen Tigranian based on the novel
- David Bek (film), a 1944 Armenian film about David Bek
- Davit Bek, Armenia, a town in Syunik Province of Armenia
