= Battle of Halidzor =

1727 battle in Syunik

- Part of the Armenian rebellion of 1722-1730
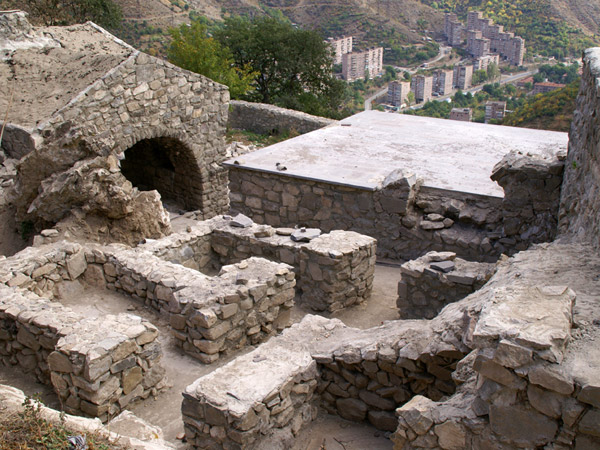
Date	26 February – 7 March 1727
Location	Halidzor Fortress, near the modern city of Kapan, Armenia
Result	Armenian victory
Territorial changes	Ottoman siege lifted

Belligerents
Principality of Kapan	Ottoman Empire; Armenian defectors

Commanders and leaders
David Bek; Mkhitar Sparapet; Ter Avetis	Unknown

Strength
300	70,000 (heavily exaggerated)

Casualties and losses
Light (Armenian claim)	13,000 (Armenian claim)

The Battle of Halidzor (Armenian: Հալիձորի ճակատամարտ) took place in the spring of 1727 at Halidzor Fortress, in what is now the Syunik region of Armenia, near the modern-day city of Kapan, between the Armenian forces under the leadership of David Bek and the Ottoman army.

== Battle ==
The main account of the Battle of Halidzor comes from the mid-eighteenth-century Armenian work Patmutiun Ghapantsvots (Armenian: Պատմութիւն Ղափանցւոց) by Ghukas Sebastatsi. The battle took place amidst a larger military campaign launched by the Ottoman Empire in the 1720s to secure control over the South Caucasus. The Ottomans encountered fierce resistance by local Armenian princes and lords in Syunik, especially near the town of Kapan, with David Bek, Mkhitar Sparapet and Ter Avetis at the head of small makeshift forces.

In the spring of 1727, pursued by the Ottomans, David Bek and his followers took refuge in the fortress at Halidzor. The Ottoman army put Halidzor under siege but came under incessant attacks launched by small Armenian units from the fortress. David Bek's comrades-in-arms, Mkhitar and Ter Avetis, did their best to boost the morale of the men in the fortress, proclaiming, "Take heart, do not be afraid, follow us, and if our end has arrived, let us die bravely, because for us it is better to die with courage outside the walls than to see before our eyes the death of our families and friends inside the walls."

After seven days, the Ottomans abandoned their emplacements and retreated. According to Armenian sources the remnants of the army dispersed across the region, with confusion and panic raging among its ranks.

While the author of Patmutiun Ghapantsvots exaggerates the size of the Ottoman army and the small size of the Armenian force, the difference between the two sides must have been significantly in favor of the Ottoman attackers. The victory at Halidzor greatly encouraged the Armenian rebels, who then expelled Ottoman forces from the area around Kapan and subsequently advanced south toward Meghri.

== Cultural impact ==
The battle is depicted in the 1978 Soviet Armenian film about Davit Bek's rebellion, Star of Hope.

== See also ==
- Halidzor Fortress
- David Bek
- Syunik rebellion
- David Bek (opera)
