= Ararat Center for Strategic Research =

Armenian think tank

The Ararat Center for Strategic Research (Armenian: «Արարատ» Ռազմավարագիտական Կենտրոն) is an Armenian think tank that focuses on security issues. Located in Yerevan, Armenia, it was founded in August 2006 and is led by Yerevan-based historian and political scientist Armen Ayvazyan. It considers itself a home grown and politically unaffiliated academic research center that was established as an independent national school of strategic thinking.

== Activities ==
On February 8, 2006, just two days before the meeting between Robert Kocharyan and Ilham Aliev in Rambouillet (France), the center held a presentation of the book titled The Liberated Territory of Armenia and the Settlement of the Nagorno-Karabakh Conflict' (Pro Patria series, vol. 1) at the Armenia-Marriott hotel in Yerevan. The purpose of this book was to demonstrate the strategic importance of territories surrounding ex-NKAO administrative borders now controlled by the Armenian Army. The book also promoted the idea that these territories should not be exchanged for any hypothetical recognition and that they should be regarded as compensation for other Armenian territorial losses.

Those present included celebrated actor Sos Sargsyan, writer Zori Balayan, the Artsakh liberation war veteran officers (including two generals), MPs and other political figures.

== Research ==
The center specializes in research on Armenia's geopolitics and military history and identity as well as other topics. Its website offers a variety of information, in-depth research and analysis on data from the Armenian-Turkish conflict, Artsakh (Nagorno-Karabakh), Javakheti, information warfare, national identity and other related fields.

== Publications ==
Pro-Patria is one of the most well known works published by the center. Released in 2006 and 2007, Pro-Patria is a two-volume publication containing a series of selected studies including facts and analysis on strategy and security. It was compiled and edited by the head of the center, Dr. Armen Ayvazyan.

- The Liberated Territory of Armenia and the Settlement of The Nagorno-Karabakh Conflict (Pro-Patria, Volume I, 2006)
- Studies on Strategy and Security (Pro-Patria, Volume II, 2007)

Other publications include:

- Javakhk: The Problems and Perspectives, 2008
- An English-Armenian Concise Explanatory Dictionary of Military Terms, 2009
- Turkification of the Toponyms in the Ottoman Empire and the Republic of Turkey, Lusine Sahakyan, Montreal – Arod Books, 2010

== Legal case ==
In 2009 the Ararat Center for Strategic Research filed a suit against the Caucasus Institute based on accusations of an Armenian genocide denial in one of their publications called Caucasus neighbourhood: Turkey and South Caucasus․ Amongst other articles was one by Turkish author Aybars Görgülü called "Turkey-Armenia relations: an eternal deadlock?" in which the author used the term genocide in quotation marks 34 times․ This was the first accusation of denial of genocide in Armenia․

== Resources and projects ==
Most of the center's publications are available via its online library. Additionally, the center launched several independent projects which were later discontinued., such as the Foreign Press Review and the Summer and Evening Schools
