= David Bek (novel) =

1882 novel by Raffi

- Author: Raffi
- Original title: Դավիթ Բեկ / Davit Bek
- Language: Armenian
- Genre: Novel
- Publication date: 1882
- Publication place: Armenia
- Media type: Print

David Bek (Դավիթ Բեկ Davit Bek) is an 1882 novel by Armenian writer Raffi based on the life of Davit Bek, an early 18th century Armenian nobleman and revolutionary. The novel was the base for David Bek, a 1944 Soviet Armenian film by Hamo Beknazarian, and the opera David Bek composed by Armen Tigranian.
