= Davit Bek =

Armenian military commander

Davit Bek Դավիթ Բեկ
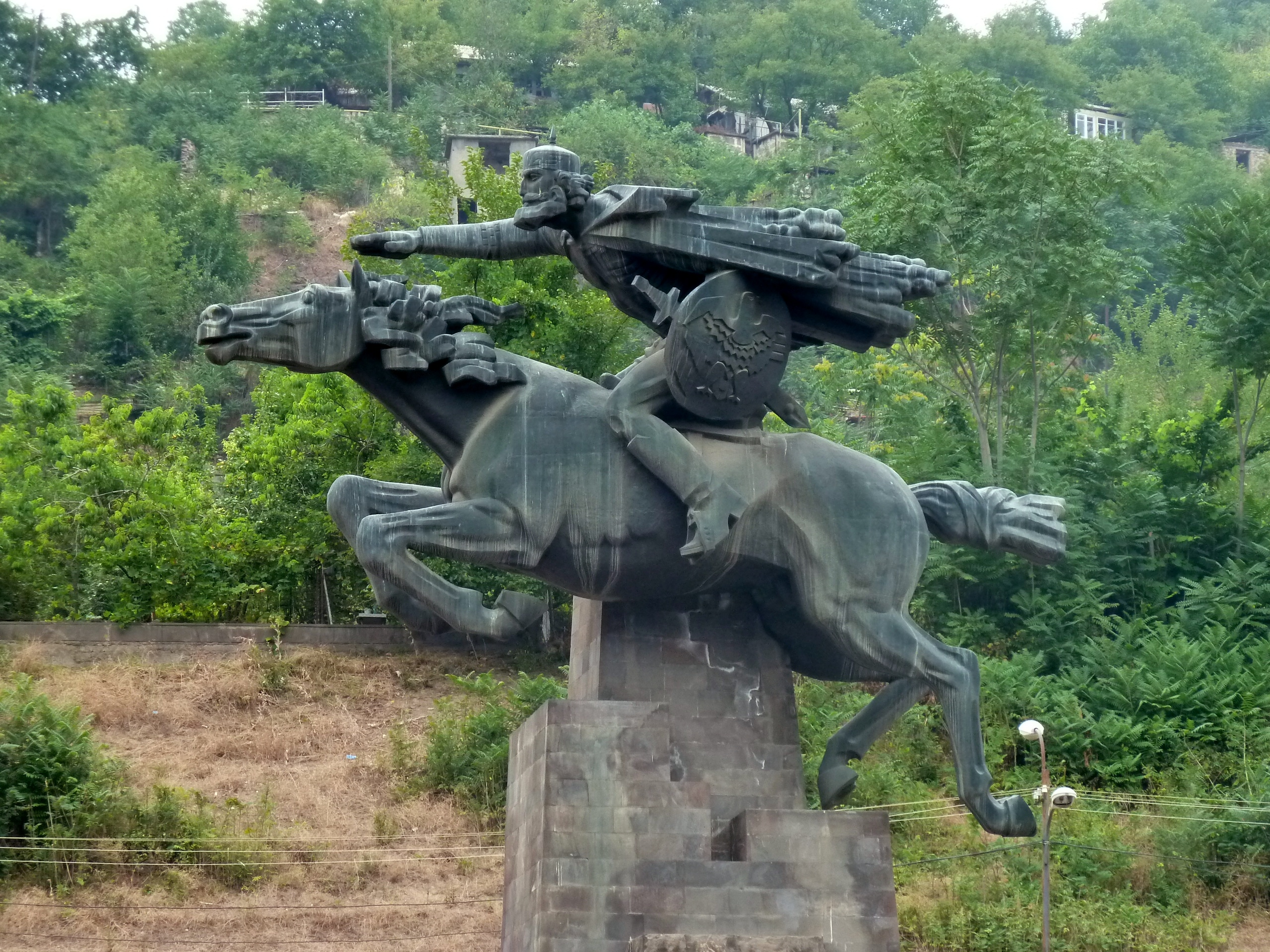
- A monument to Davit Bek in Kapan
- Born: unknown date in the 17th century
- Died: 1728
- Military career
- Service years: 1722–1728
- Rank: Supreme commander
- Conflicts: Syunik rebellion: Battle of Halidzor; Battle of Yeghēvard; Battles of Meghri; Battle of Chavndur; Siege of Vorotnaberd; Capture of Zeyva fortress

Davit Bek or David Beg (Armenian: Դավիթ Բեկ; (Note: Classical orthography: Դաւիթ Բէկ or Դաւիթ Բէգ. Bek (or Beg) is a Turkic honorary title; it was appended to the names of the younger brothers and sons of the Armenian meliks.) died 1728) was an Armenian military commander and the leader of an Armenian rebellion against the invading Ottoman Empire and implanted Safavid Muslim tribes in the mountainous region of Zangezur (today the Armenian province of Syunik and part of the province of Vayots Dzor). He was one of the most prominent military figures of the Armenian liberation movement of the 18th century.

After the fall of the Safavids in 1722, Davit Bek established himself as the military leader of the local Armenians of Syunik and Kapan during the Ottoman Turkish invasion and the attacks of the local Muslim tribes. Davit was successful in preventing the various Muslim tribes from making proper territorial gains. In 1727, in order to put a halt to the Ottoman approach in the area, King Tahmasp II of Iran appointed Davit as the governor of the area, and gave him the right to administer the area as a vassal Armenian principality under Iranian control. Following his death in 1728, he was succeeded by his comrade-in-arms Mkhitar Sparapet as the leader of Armenian forces in Zangezur.

== Biography ==
Little is known about Davit's early life. Most of what is known about him comes from the mid-eighteenth-century Armenian text titled Patmutʻiwn Ghapʻantsʻwotsʻ ("History of the Kapanians") by the Mekhitarist monk Ghukas Sebastatsi, which was based on the accounts of Stepanos Shahumyan of Meghri and a few other participants in the Syunik rebellion. Almost nothing is said in this work about Davit Bek's background. One version of Patmutʻiwn Ghapʻantsʻwotsʻ refers to Syunik as Davit Bek's "native land." Most eighteenth-century manuscripts write that Davit was a Georgian Armenian from Mtskheta, although at the time Armenians from Tiflis (Tbilisi) were frequently referred to as Mtskhetians. According to Ashot Hovhannisyan and Hakob Papazyan, it is possible that Davit Bek was related to one of noble families (Meliks) of Syunik, many members of which settled in Georgia, although there is no solid evidence for the later claims of two of the noble families of Syunik, the Orbelians and the Melik-Parsadanyans, to be related to him. One colophon of an Armenian manuscript written in 1746 in Astrakhan describes Davit Bek as the son of Alikhan and the son-in-law of a Tiflis Armenian notable named Parsadan Bek. It is known that Davit Bek was an officer of the vali (viceroy)/king of Kartli, Vakhtang VI (also known as Hosaynqoli Khan).

The Armenian Meliks, local feudal lords, had long been recognized as governors of the area by the Iranian shahs. In 1722, however, the Safavid state collapsed. Numerous Muslim tribes in the area were now competing for influence in the area. Peter the Great's steady advance south towards the Caucasus during the Russo-Persian War of 1722–1723 with a massive 30,000-strong army had revived hope among the Armenians and Georgians that Russian arms could help remove the region from Muslim dominion. Muslim misrule in the regions of Kapan and Artsakh (Karabakh) eventually provoked the Armenian meliks in 1722 to request military aid from Vakhtang.

Vakhtang agreed to aid the meliks; he sent Davit Bek, reportedly one of his most capable officers, together with some 2,000 Armenian soldiers. Davit made the fort of Halidzor his base of operations. With the support of the local peasants and the meliks, Davit managed to defend the Armenian-inhabited areas from the Muslim tribes. He also fought against those Armenian meliks who opposed the rebellion. Encouraged by his successes, many Armenians raised the banner of revolt against the Muslims and joined Davit's ranks. The meliks of Karabakh, who were waging their own battles against Muslim rulers, cooperated with Davit Bek, lending him men and materiel. In the spring of 1724, a force of 2,000 fighters from Karabakh commanded by Avan Yuzbashi and Ivan Karapet joined Davit Bek's forces in Kapan.

Although initially Davit's main enemy were the Iranians, he soon came to the conclusion that it was the Ottoman Turks who posed a much greater danger. In 1724, the Ottomans invaded Iran and Eastern Armenia, capturing Tiflis, Yerevan and Hamadan, prompting the Armenians to ally with the Iranians against the Ottoman invaders.

In the spring of 1727, Davit Bek won a spectacular victory over a larger Ottoman army at the Battle of Halidzor. The Armenian forces went on to drive the Turks out of Kapan and advanced south towards Meghri, capturing the Ottoman-controlled Meghri Fortress. In 1727, in order to put a halt to the Ottoman approach in the area, King Tahmasp II of Iran appointed Davit the governor of the area, and gave him the right to administer the area as a vassal Armenian principality under Iranian control. Davit Bek then campaigned against the Ottomans at Ordubad and Agulis.

The circumstances of Davit Bek's death in 1728 are uncertain. Some scholars believe he died fighting the Turks, while others attribute his death to illness. After Davit Bek's death, command of the Armenian forces in Syunik passed to Mkhitar Sparapet.

== In popular culture ==
Davit Bek inspired the historical novel David Bek (1882) by Raffi. In 1944, at the height of World War II, the movie David Bek was filmed by director Hamo Beknazarian with Hrachia Nersisyan starring as Davit Bek. The opera David Bek by Armen Tigranian premiered in 1950. In 1978 Armenfilm in association with Mosfilm produced another movie about the efforts of Davit Bek and his successor Mkhitar Sparapet called Huso astgh ("Star of Hope"), directed by Edmond Keosayan. Davit Bek was portrayed by Georgian actor Edisher Magalashvili.

== See also ==
- Battle of Halidzor

== Sources ==
- Adalian, Rouben Paul (2010). Historical Dictionary of Armenia (2nd ed.). Scarecrow Press. ISBN 978-0810874503.
- Aramian, Samuel, ed. (1978). Dawitʻ Bēk kam «Patmutʻiwn Ghapʻantsʻwotsʻ» Դաւիթ Բէկ կամ «Պատմութիւն Ղափանցւոց» [Davit Bek or "History of the Ghapanians"]. Hayagitakan matenashar "Bazmavep", 12 (in Armenian). Venice: S. Ghazar. OCLC 24811457.
- Bournoutian, George A. (2001). Armenians and Russia, 1626-1796: A Documentary Record. Mazda Publishers. ISBN 978-1568591322.
- —— (1997). "Eastern Armenia from the Seventeenth Century to the Russian Annexation". In Hovannisian, Richard (ed.). The Armenian People From Ancient to Modern Times, Volume II: Foreign Dominion to Statehood: The Fifteenth Century to the Twentieth Century. New York: Palgrave Macmillan. ISBN 1-4039-6422-X.
- Hewsen, Robert H. (1972). "The Meliks of Eastern Armenia: A Preliminary Study". Revue des Études Arméniennes. Nouvelle série. IX: 285–329.
- —— (2001). Armenia: A Historical Atlas. Chicago University Press. ISBN 0-226-33228-4.
- Hovhannisyan, A. G.; Pʻapʻazyan, H. D. (1972). "Hay azatagrakan sharzhumě iranakan tirapetutʻyan ev tʻurkʻ zavtʻichʻneri dem XVIII dari aṛajin kesin" [The Armenian liberation movement against Iranian rule and the Turkish invaders in the first half of the 18th century]. In Khachikyan, L. S.; et al. (eds.). Hay zhoghovrdi patmutʻyun [History of the Armenian People] (in Armenian). Vol. IV. Yerevan: Armenian SSR Academy of Sciences Publishing House. pp. 131–189.
- Nalbandian, Louise (1963). The Armenian Revolutionary Movement: The Development of Armenian Political Parties Through the Nineteenth Century. University of California Press. ISBN 978-0520009141.
- Shahumean, Stepʻannos (1871). Dawitʻ Bēg: Ěntir patmutʻiwn Dawitʻ Bēgin, ew paterazmatsʻ hayotsʻn Khapʻanu… Դաւիթ Բէգ : Ընտիր պատմութիւն Դաւիթ Բէգին, եւ պատերազմաց հայոցն Խափանու… (in Armenian). Vagharshapt: Tparan S. Ējmiatsni. OCLC 1242865573.
