= Halidzor Fortress =

Fortress in Syunik Province, Armenia

- Հալիձորի բերդ
- Syunik Province, Armenia
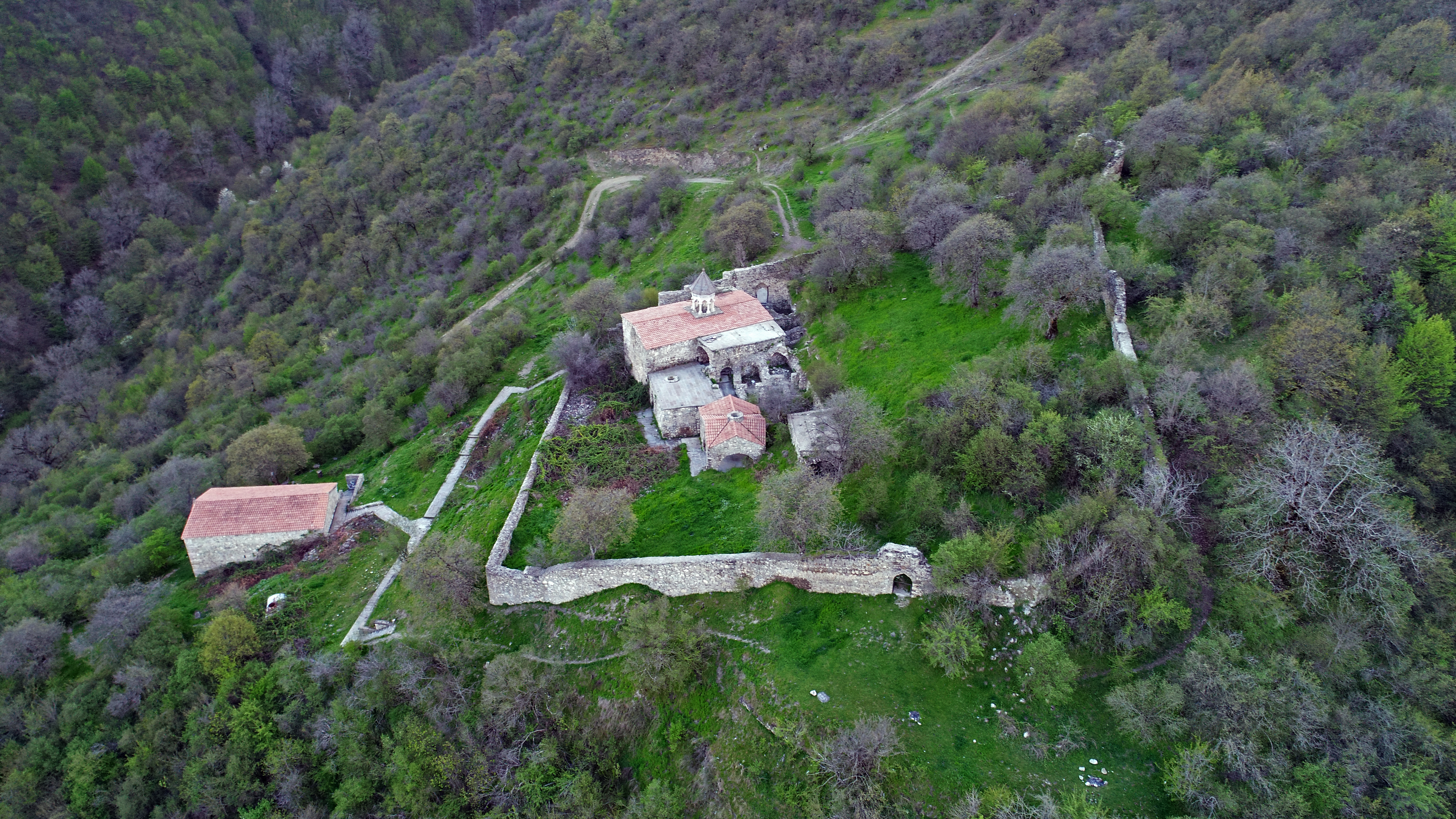
- Aerial view of the fortress

Site information
- Type: Fortress
- Open to the public: Yes
- Condition: Some of the fortress walls and structures within survive intact.

Location
- Shown within Armenia Halidzor Fortress (Syunik Province)
- Coordinates: 39.2192°N 46.3533°E

Site history
- Materials: Stone
- Demolished: Partially
- Battles/wars: Seven-day siege by 70,000 Ottoman Turks.

Garrison information
- Past commanders: David Bek and Mkhitar Sparapet, 18th century

The fortress of Halidzor (Armenian: Հալիձորի բերդ) is along a hill overlooking the Voghji River to the north, near the town of Kapan, which is 1 kilometre (0.6 mi) southwest in the Syunik Province of Armenia. Halidzor Fortress is 1,051 metres (3,448 ft) above sea level.

== History ==
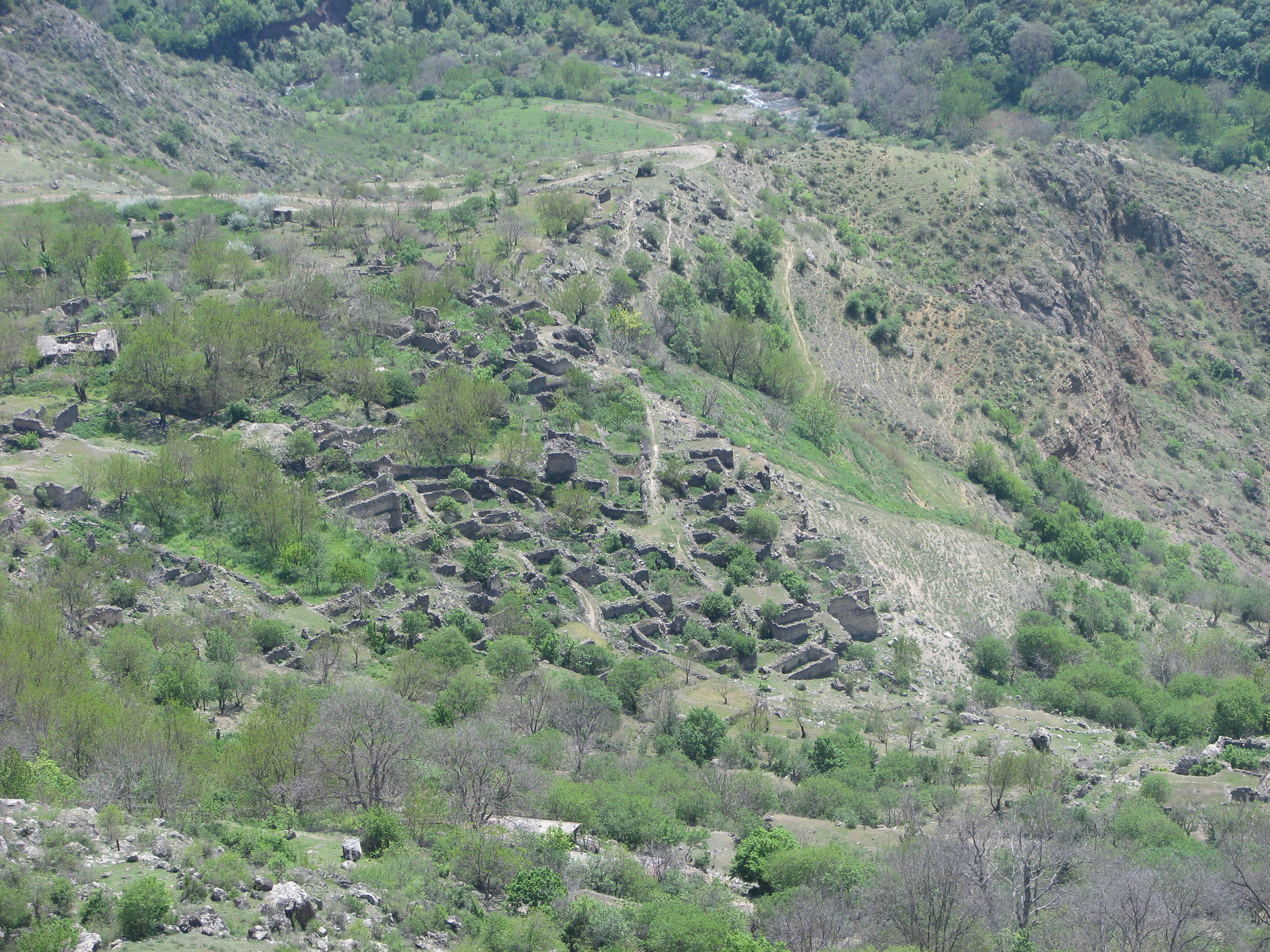
Remains of Old Halidzor settlement

Halidzor was originally built by Armenian meliks in the 17th century to serve as a nunnery. It later served as a fortress for the Melik Parsadanian family for a short time.

During the 18th century, the famous Armenian military commander and liberator David Bek and his chief lieutenant and successor Mkhitar Sparapet used the site as their main headquarters as well as an administrative center for Syunik in their fight against the forces of the Ottoman Empire and the Iranians. Between 1723 and 1727, Bek along with 300 other soldiers, 13 bishops, and three priests defended the fortress in a seven-day siege from an invading army of 70,000 Ottoman Turks. The defensive nature of the location gave Bek's soldiers an advantage when fighting the enemy, but the siege left the defenders of the fortress weary with little food. Feeling that they were trapped and outnumbered he led a suicidal charge down the hill that terrified the invading army. The Turks hastily fled the area purportedly leaving 12,000 enemy soldiers dead on the field below.

David Bek later died at the fortress after coming down with an illness in 1728. Oral tradition tells that after his death, an elderly bishop from Tatev came and held a very large funeral service in his honor. Bek is reputedly buried in the cemetery just outside the fortress walls. The tombstone is said to have a single flower carved on its underside so that the enemy would not recognize that it is the leader's final resting place.

After David Bek's death, the Ottoman army captured Halidzor and notified the defenders that they would take control of the fortress but leave the battalion and residents unharmed. The priest (Der Avedis) wanted solely to negotiate with the Turks, but Mkhitar Sparapet who was now in command of the fortress and the priest together went to negotiate. When they opened doors to the fortress, some of the defenders were slain.

== Architecture ==
The walls of the fortress are laid out in an irregular quadrangle site plan. Within the walls of the fortress are the remains of the church of S. Minas and a chapel as well as the foundations of what had once served as dwellings and other structures. Two arched portals lead into Halidzor from the exterior fortification walls to the north and the south. At the southwestern corner of the fortified wall is a tower and from the north to the east there is a terrace.

A secret tunnel once ran 500 metres (1,600 ft) to the Voghji River to allow its inhabitants access to fresh water in the event of a siege (one of the reasons Bek's men were able to stand their ground rather than surrender during the siege by the Turks). It is now covered, and sections of the tunnel are in ruin.

The church at the eastern side of Halidzor is a vaulted hall-type structure constructed from large stones in the form of rubble masonry. At either side and adjacent to the apse are sacristies. At the north and south walls of the building are the remains of two-storied porticos. The main church of S. Minas is built in a similar architectural technique as the construction of the other church. The eastern yard of the church has been widened.

In 2006 restoration and reconstruction work began at Halidzor and ended as of 2010.

== See also ==
- Battle of Halidzor
