= Armen Ayvazyan =

Armenian historian and political scientist

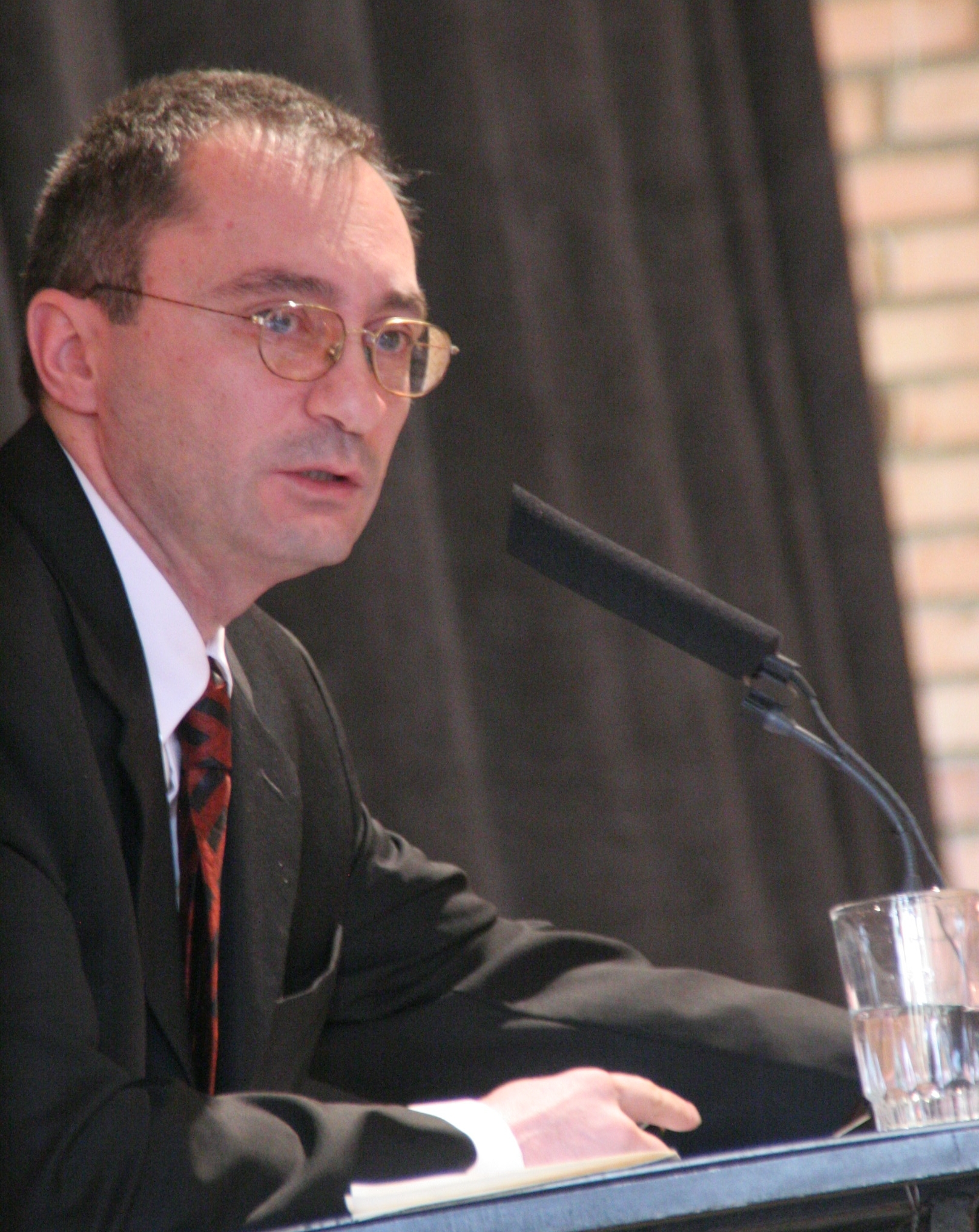
Armen Ayvazyan at Conference on interstate developments between Armenia and Turkey, 2008

Armen Ayvazyan (Armenian: Արմեն Այվազյան) (born May 14, 1964, Yerevan) is an Armenian historian and political scientist.

Ayvazyan is the director of the Ararat Center for Strategic Research and senior researcher in the Matenadaran, the Yerevan Institute of Medieval Manuscripts. He holds doctoral degrees in history (1992) and political science (2004).

From 1992 to 1994 he worked as assistant to the president of Armenia, adviser to the foreign minister of Armenia, and acting head of the Armenian delegation to the Conference (now Organization) on Security and Cooperation in Europe at Vienna.

He was a recipient of an International Security Studies grant provided by the Carnegie Corporation of New York, working in affiliation with the Program on the Analysis and Resolution of Conflicts, Maxwell School of Citizenship and Public Affairs, Syracuse University (1995). During the 1997-1998 academic year, he was a Visiting Senior Fulbright Scholar, affiliated with the Center for Russian and East European Studies, Stanford University, US. He was a Visiting Alexander S. Onassis Foundation Fellow at ELIAMEP, Hellenic Foundation for European and Foreign Policy (2000–2001, Athens).

Ayvazyan worked as adjunct assistant professor of political science at the American University of Armenia, a Fellow at the American University of Armenia's Center for Policy Analysis, guest lecturer at the Yerevan State University and professor of political science of the Armenian State Academy of Governance. He was team leader of the European Commission's sponsored Campaign Against "Corruption-Friendly" Legal and Social Settings in Armenia program in 2004-2005.

== Publications ==
After the presidential elections in 2013, he wrote a highly critical article in the Harvard International Review, where he qualified the Russian-Western geopolitical game over the influence in Armenia as a lose-lose situation, which damages both their long-term strategic interests and the viability of Armenia.

== Selected bibliography ==
=== Works ===
- The Armenian Rebellion of the 1720s and the Threat of Genocidal Reprisal. Centre for Policy Analysis American University of Armenia, Yerevan 1997
- The Settlement of the Nagorno-Karabakh Conflict and the Strategic Security of Armenia. 1998 (original title: Ղարաբաղյան հակամարտության կարգավորումը և Հայաստանի ռազմավարական անվտանգությունը)
- The History of Armenia as Presented in American Historiography: A Critical Survey. 1998, (original title: Հայաստանի պատմության լուսաբանումը ամերիկյան պատմագրության մեջջ. քննական տեսություն.)
- The Code of Honor of the Armenian Military, 4-5th centuries 2000 (original title: Հայ զինվորականության պատվո վարքականոնը, 4-5-րդ դարեր)
- Mother Tongue and The Origins of Nationalism: A Comparative Study of the Armenian and European Primary Sources Matenadaran (Artagers), Yerevan, 2001 (original title: Մայրենի լեզուն և ազգայնականության սկզբնավորումը. հայկական և եվրոպական սկզբնաղբյուրների համեմատական քննություն)
- The Armenian Church at the Crossroads of the Armenian Liberation Movement in the 18th century. Lusakn, Yerevan 2003 (original title: այոց եկեղեցին XVIII դարի հայ ազատագրական շարժման քառուղիներում)
- Essential Elements for Armenia's National Security Doctrine. Yerevan, Part 1. 2003 (original title: Հիմնատարրեր Հայաստանի ազգային անվտանգության հայեցակարգի։)
- The Cornerstones of Armenian Identity. The Armenian Language, Army and State. 2007 (original title: Հայկական ինքնության հիմնաքարերը. լեզու, բանակ, պետություն)
- The Armenian Military in the Byzantine Empire : Conflict and Alliance under Justinian and Maurice. 2012 (in English, translated also into French` Les forces militaires arméniennes dans l'Empire byzantin : Luttes et alliances sous Justinien et Maurice)

=== Editorship, compilations ===
- An Anthology of International Anti-Corruption Experience. (Ed. together with G. Yazichian), 2005 (original title: Հակակոռուպցիոն ռազմավարության միջազգային փորձը.)
- Pro Patria. The Liberated Territory of Armenia and the Settlement of the Nagorno-Karabakh Conflict. 2006 (original title: Հայրենատիրություն)
- Pro Patria. The Questions of Strategy and Security. Selected Studies. volume 2, 2007 (original title: Հայրենատիրություն)
