= Avan Yuzbashi =

- Born: ca. 1670
- Died: 1735
- Military career
- Allegiance: Melikdoms of Karabakh
- Service years: 1724-1728
- Rank: Supreme commander of the five melikdoms of Artsakh.

Avan Yuzbashi (Armenian: Ավան հարյուրապետ, romanized: Avan haryurapet; ca. 1670–1735), (Note: The Turkish title yüzbaşı and the Armenian equivalent հարյուրապետ (haryurapet) both literally mean "commander of a hundred men.") also known in Armenian historiography as Prince Hovhannes (Hovhannes Ishkhan) or Avan Mirza was an 18th-century Armenian military leader in Karabagh, and an important figure of the Armenian liberation struggle during the 1720s in Karabagh.

== Biography ==
Armenian historian Ashot Hovhannisian wrote that Avan Yuzbashi likely laid the foundation for Shusha's fortress walls in 1724, if not earlier.

Avan was instrumental in aiding David Bek's forces and gaining victories over the forces of Safavid Iran and the Ottoman Empire in the Zangezur region. In a letter to the Russian monarch, Yuzbashi wrote, "We will fight until that time when we will enter the service of the tsar, and all will perish to the last one but we will not leave Christianity; we will fight for our faith." Kekhva Chelebi, an Armenian patriot who maintained correspondence between the meliks of Karabakh and the Russian authorities, reports:

… The nearest Armenian stronghold … was Shushi. Shushi is four days' distance from Shemakhi. Armed Armenians under the command of Avan Yuzbashi guard it. After meeting with the Armenian leaders, including the Patriarch, they returned to Derbent via Shemakhi. Rocky mountains surround the town of Shushi. The number of the armed Armenians has not been determined. There are rumors that the Armenians have defeated the Turks in a number of skirmishes in Karabagh …

== Sources ==
- Bournoutian, George A. (2001). Armenians and Russia, 1626-1796: A Documentary Record. Mazda Publishers. ISBN 978-1568591322.
- Kiesling, Brady (2005), Rediscovering Armenia: Guide, Yerevan, Armenia: Matit Graphic Design Studio
- Suny, Ronald Grigor (1993). Looking Toward Ararat: Armenia in Modern History. Bloomington, Indiana: Indiana University Press.
