= David Bek (opera) =

David Bek (Armenian: Դավիթ Բեկ) is an opera composed by Armen Tigranian based on the novel David Bek (1880–82) by Raffi. After the composer's death, the opera was completed by Levon Khoja-Eynatyan, G. Budaghyan, and the libretto was developed by Aram Ter-Hovhannisyan.

The opera describes events surrounding the historical figure of David Bek in the early 18th century and the struggle of the Armenian people against Persia and the Ottoman Turks.

David Bek was first performed in Yerevan in 1950.

== Recordings ==
- David's aria on Arias of Love & Sorrow Gevorg Hakobyan (baritone), Kaunas Symphony Orchestra, John Fisher, Constantine Orbelian 2023
