= Mkhitar Sparapet =

Armenian Military Commander and Rebel

Mkhitar Sparapet Մխիթար Սպարապետ
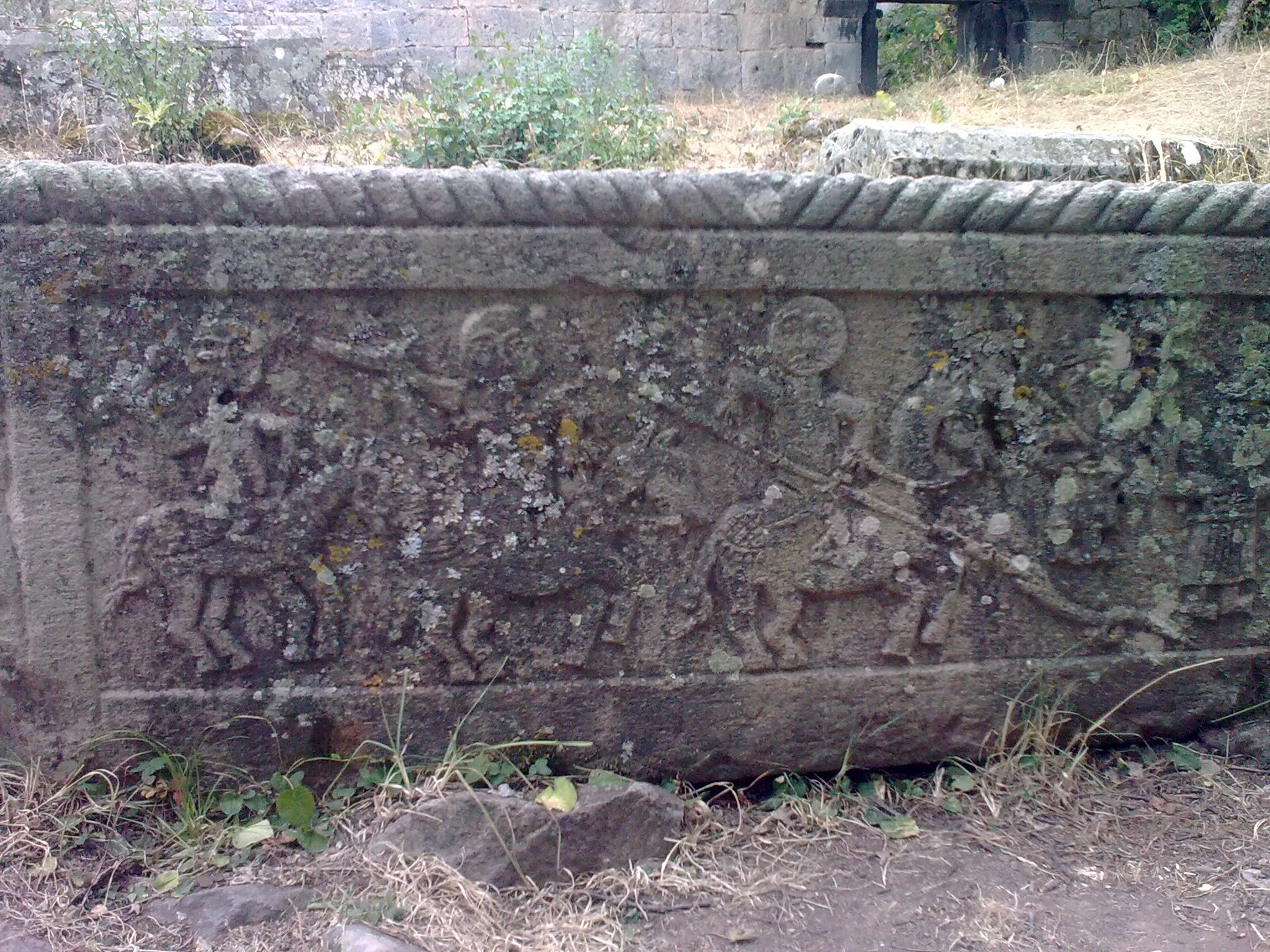
- The tomb of Mkhitar Sparapet
- Died: 1730; Murdered by Armenian villagers of Khndzoresk.
- Burial place: A tomb in a gorge near Nerkin Khndzoresk and Old Khndzoresk.
- Military career
- Allegiance: Armenian national movement
- Service years: 1722/5–1728; 1728–1730
- Rank: Sparapet

Mkhitar Sparapet (Armenian: Մխիթար Սպարապետ; sparapet meaning "general-in-chief"; died 1730), also known as Mkhitar Bek, was an 18th-century Armenian military commander and participant in the Armenian armed rebellion in the Syunik region of Transcaucasia. He was instrumental in David Bek's victories over the forces of Safavid Iran and Ottoman Turkey in Armenia's Syunik region. Their main headquarters were at the fortress of Halidzor which also served as the administrative center for Syunik. Mkhitar served as chief aide to David Bek and later his successor after his death in 1728.

After the Ottoman Turks captured and destroyed Halidzor fortress, Mkhitar managed to escape towards Kapan and continue a guerrilla campaign against the Turkish invaders. However, the Armenian forces faced replenished Ottoman forces, lacked a single headquarters and were plagued by internal disagreements. In 1730, Mkhitar was murdered by Armenian villagers of Khndzoresk, who had implored him to have his own fortifications destroyed during his conflicts rather than their village. His head was presented to the Ottoman Pasha at Tabriz, who found this act of treachery detestable and had the murderers decapitated. The tomb of Mkhitar Sparapet is located in a gorge not far from Nerkin Khndzoresk and Old Khndzoresk. The inscription on the tomb, which incorrectly dates Mkhitar's death to 1726, writes that he was "from the land of Ganja" and "died young without having reached his goal."

Mkhitar's death marked the end of the 18th-century Armenian liberation struggle in Syunik. However, oral traditions from Syunik hold that Armenian resistance continued under different leaders until Nader Shah drove out the Ottoman Turks and restored Iranian control over Transcaucasia in 1735.

== Popular culture ==
Mkhitar is one of the characters of the Soviet film David Bek, released in 1944. The novel Mkhitar Sparapet by Sero Khanzadyan was published in 1961. A film about Mkhitar Sparapet directed by Edmond Keosayan titled Huso astgh ("Star of Hope") was released in 1978 by Armenfilm and Mosfilm, with Armen Dzhigarkhanyan playing the role of Mkhitar; the film enjoyed success in Soviet Armenia.

== Sparapet Day ==
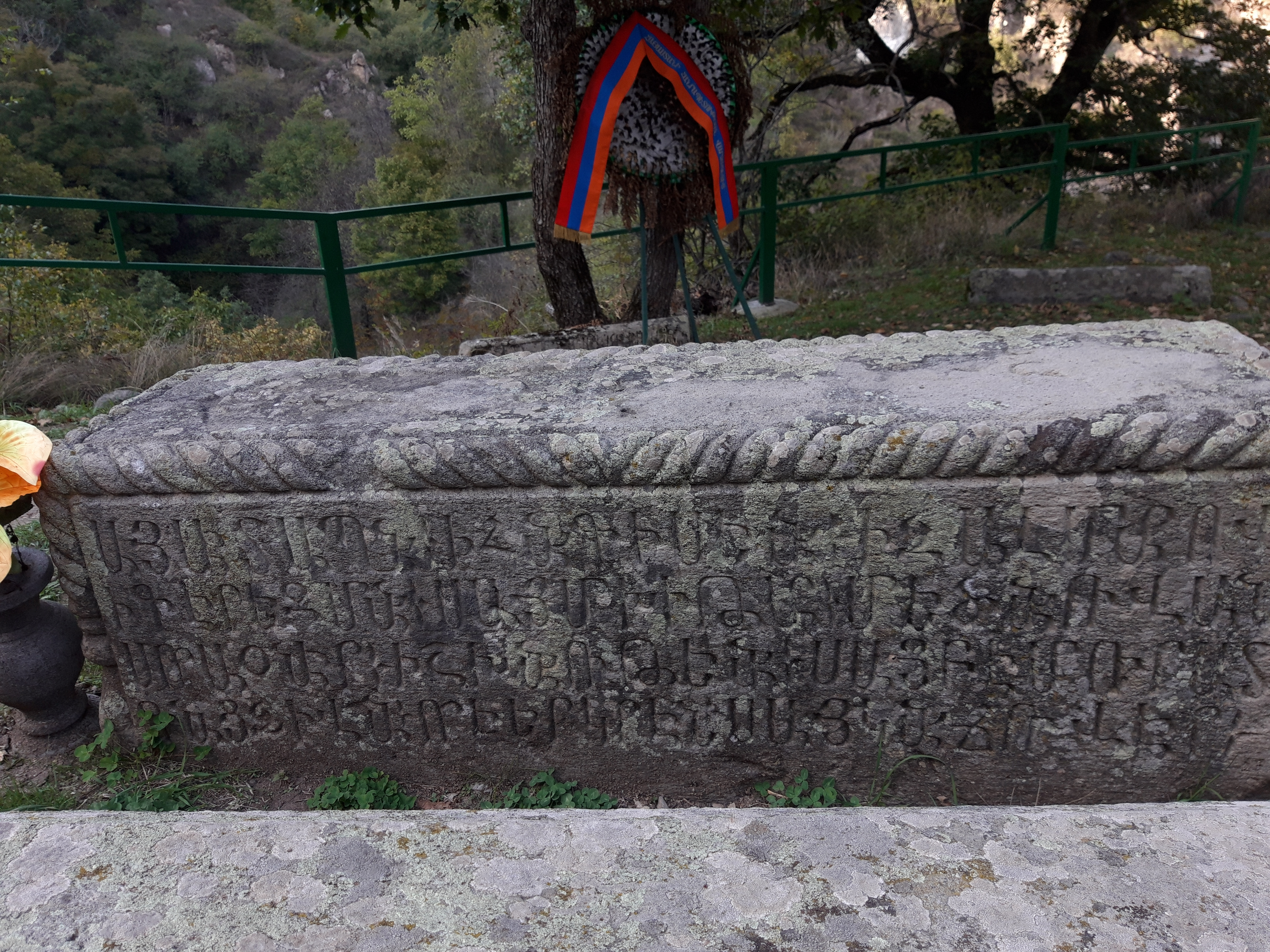
The inscription on Mkhitar Sparapet's tomb

Sparapet Day (Armenian: Սպարապետի օր) is a public holiday in Armenia that is commemorated on 12 September, honoring the memory of Mkhitar Sparapet. The President of Armenia, the Prime Minister of Armenia, and the Defence Minister attend the official celebrations. Mkhitar Sparapet's tomb in Khndzoresk, Syunik Province is the focal point of the celebrations.

== Sources ==
- Adalian, Rouben Paul (2010). Historical Dictionary of Armenia (2 ed.). Scarecrow Press. ISBN 978-0810874503.
- Bournoutian, George A. (2001). Armenians and Russia, 1626-1796: A Documentary Record. Mazda Publishers. ISBN 978-1568591322.
- Dolukhanyan, Aelita (2014). "«Mkhitʻar Sparapet» patmavepi vaverakanutʻyuně" [Veracity of the historical novel "Mkhitar Sparapet"] (PDF). Grakanagitakan Handes (in Armenian). ԺԵ (15). Institute of Literature after M. Abeghyan of NAS of RA: 1–15.
- Hovhannisyan, A. G.; Pʻapʻazyan, H. D. (1972). "Azatagrakan kṛivnerě Syunikʻum" [Liberatory struggles in Syunik]. In Khachikyan, L. S.; et al. (eds.). Hay zhoghovrdi patmutʻyun (in Armenian). Vol. IV. Yerevan: Armenian SSR Academy of Sciences Publishing House.
- Kiesling, Brady (2000), Rediscovering Armenia: Guide (PDF), Yerevan: Matit Graphic Design Studio, archived from the original on 3 May 2006
